= 2011 Four Continents Figure Skating Championships =

2011 Four Continents Championships
- Type: ISU Championship
- Date: February 15 – 20
- Season: 2010–11
- Location: Taipei, Taiwan
- Venue: Taipei Arena

Champions
- Men's singles: (Japan) Daisuke Takahashi
- Ladies' singles: (Japan) Miki Ando
- Pairs: (China) Pang Qing / Tong Jian
- Ice dance: (United States) Meryl Davis / Charlie White
- Previous: 2010 Four Continents Championships
- Next: 2012 Four Continents Championships

The 2011 Four Continents Figure Skating Championships was an international figure skating competition in the 2010–11 season. It was held at the Taipei Arena in Taipei, Taiwan on February 15–20. Medals were awarded in the disciplines of men's singles, ladies' singles, pair skating, and ice dancing.

== Qualification ==
The competition was open to skaters from a non-European member nation of the International Skating Union who reached the age of 15 by July 1, 2010. Each country may send up to three entries per discipline.

The corresponding competition for European skaters was the 2011 European Figure Skating Championships.

== Entries ==
Country	Men	Ladies	Pairs	Ice dancing
Australia	Brendan Kerry; Mark Webster	Cheltzie Lee; Jaimee Nobbs		Maria Borounov / Evgeni Borounov; Danielle O'Brien / Gregory Merriman
Canada	Kevin Reynolds; Joey Russell; Shawn Sawyer	Amélie Lacoste; Cynthia Phaneuf; Myriane Samson	Meagan Duhamel / Eric Radford; Paige Lawrence / Rudi Swiegers; Kirsten Moore-Towers / Dylan Moscovitch	Vanessa Crone / Paul Poirier; Tessa Virtue / Scott Moir; Kaitlyn Weaver / Andrew Poje
China	Guan Jinlin; Song Nan; Wu Jialiang	Geng Bingwa; Zhu Qiuying	Dong Huibo / Wu Yiming; Pang Qing / Tong Jian; Zhang Yue / Wang Lei	Guan Xueting / Wang Meng; Huang Xintong / Zheng Xun; Yu Xiaoyang / Wang Chen
Chinese Taipei	Jordan Ju; Stephen Li-Chung Kuo; Wun-Chang Shih	Crystal Kiang; Chaochih Liu; Melinda Wang		
Hong Kong		Tiffany Packard Yu		
Japan	Yuzuru Hanyu; Takahiko Kozuka; Daisuke Takahashi	Miki Ando; Mao Asada; Akiko Suzuki	Narumi Takahashi / Mervin Tran	
Kazakhstan	Abzal Rakimgaliev			
Mexico		Reyna Hamui; Mary Ro Reyes		Corenne Bruhns / Benjamin Westenberger
Philippines		Mericien Venzon		
Puerto Rico		Victoria Muniz		
Singapore		Brittany Lau		
South Africa		Lejeanne Marais		
South Korea	Kim Min-seok	Kim Chae-hwa; Kwak Min-jeong; Yun Yea-ji		
Thailand		Mimi Tanasorn Chindasook; Taryn Jurgensen; Melanie Swang		
United States	Jeremy Abbott; Armin Mahbanoozadeh; Adam Rippon	Alissa Czisny; Rachael Flatt; Mirai Nagasu	Amanda Evora / Mark Ladwig; Mary Beth Marley / Rockne Brubaker; Caitlin Yankowskas / John Coughlin	Madison Chock / Greg Zuerlein; Meryl Davis / Charlie White; Maia Shibutani / Alex Shibutani
Uzbekistan	Misha Ge			

== Schedule ==
- Thursday, February 17
  - 16:00 Ice dancing: Short dance
  - 19:30 Pairs: Short program
- Friday, February 18
  - 12:00 Men: Short program
  - 16:45 Pairs: Free skating
  - 20:00 Ice dancing: Free dance
- Saturday, February 19
  - 13:00 Ladies: Short program
  - 18:00 Men: Free skating
- Sunday, February 20
  - 11:30 Ladies: Free skating
  - 17:30 Exhibition

== Results ==
=== Men ===
Daisuke Takahashi won the event for the second time.

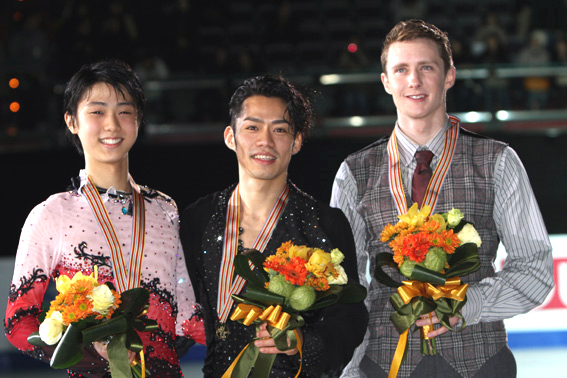
Men's podium

Rank	Name	Nation	Total points	SP		FS	
1	Daisuke Takahashi	Japan	244.00	1	83.49	1	160.51
2	Yuzuru Hanyu	Japan	228.01	3	76.43	3	151.58
3	Jeremy Abbott	United States	225.71	2	76.73	4	148.98
4	Takahiko Kozuka	Japan	223.52	6	66.25	2	157.27
5	Adam Rippon	United States	210.01	4	72.71	5	137.30
6	Guan Jinlin	China	201.98	9	64.68	6	137.30
7	Armin Mahbanoozadeh	United States	200.67	5	66.40	9	134.27
8	Wu Jialiang	China	199.78	10	63.30	7	136.48
9	Song Nan	China	195.13	12	60.47	8	134.66
10	Shawn Sawyer	Canada	192.94	7	65.71	10	127.23
11	Kevin Reynolds	Canada	191.55	8	65.47	11	126.08
12	Misha Ge	Uzbekistan	182.06	13	58.60	12	123.46
13	Abzal Rakimgaliev	Kazakhstan	180.75	11	60.95	13	119.80
14	Joey Russell	Canada	171.18	14	57.67	15	113.51
15	Kim Min-seok	South Korea	168.59	15	53.67	14	114.92
16	Mark Webster	Australia	143.54	16	48.26	16	95.28
17	Jordan Ju	Chinese Taipei	134.33	18	44.37	17	89.96
18	Brendan Kerry	Australia	125.64	17	45.45	19	80.19
19	Wun-Chang Shih	Chinese Taipei	120.96	19	40.36	18	80.60
20	Stephen Li-Chung Kuo	Chinese Taipei	117.96	20	37.82	20	80.14

=== Ladies ===
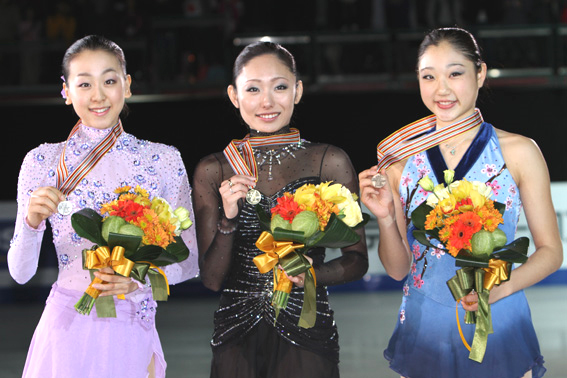
Ladies' podium

Rank	Name	Nation	Total points	SP		FS	
1	Miki Ando	Japan	201.34	1	66.58	1	134.76
2	Mao Asada	Japan	196.30	2	63.41	2	132.89
3	Mirai Nagasu	United States	189.46	4	59.78	3	129.68
4	Rachael Flatt	United States	180.31	3	62.23	4	118.08
5	Alissa Czisny	United States	168.81	5	58.94	5	109.87
6	Cynthia Phaneuf	Canada	163.14	7	55.65	6	107.49
7	Akiko Suzuki	Japan	162.59	6	57.64	7	104.95
8	Kwak Min-jeong	South Korea	147.15	8	50.47	8	96.68
9	Amélie Lacoste	Canada	137.48	9	50.06	9	87.42
10	Cheltzie Lee	Australia	127.90	10	48.72	10	79.18
11	Myriane Samson	Canada	121.20	11	46.33	11	74.87
12	Yun Yea-ji	South Korea	111.86	12	39.37	12	72.49
13	Geng Bingwa	China	104.58	13	39.20	16	65.38
14	Zhu Qiuying	China	102.38	16	35.08	15	67.30
15	Lejeanne Marais	South Africa	101.90	19	31.99	13	69.91
16	Kim Chae-hwa	South Korea	101.79	17	33.76	14	68.03
17	Victoria Muniz	Puerto Rico	99.40	15	35.45	17	63.95
18	Melinda Wang	Chinese Taipei	96.15	14	36.51	18	59.64
19	Mimi Tanasorn Chindasook	Thailand	91.54	18	33.73	20	57.81
20	Jaimee Nobbs	Australia	89.93	20	31.94	19	57.99
21	Crystal Kiang	Chinese Taipei	86.60	21	31.89	21	54.71
22	Mericien Venzon	Philippines	84.17	22	30.64	22	53.53
23	Melanie Swang	Thailand	82.08	23	29.50	23	52.58
24	Chaochih Liu	Chinese Taipei	78.28	24	28.52	24	49.76
Did not advance to free skating
25	Tiffany Packard Yu	Hong Kong		25	27.51		
26	Brittany Lau	Singapore		26	26.61		
27	Taryn Jurgensen	Thailand		27	26.28		
28	Reyna Hamui	Mexico		28	23.73		
29	Mary Ro Reyes	Mexico		29	22.22		

=== Pairs ===
Pang / Tong won the event for the fifth time.

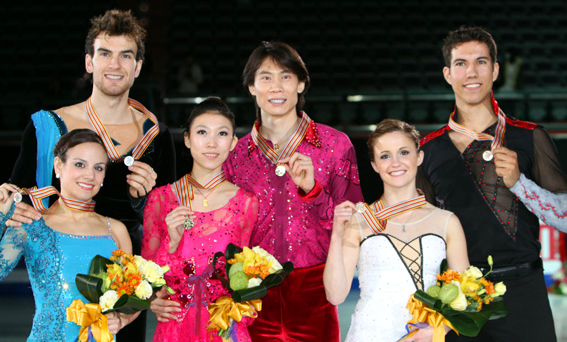
Pairs' podium

Rank	Name	Nation	Total points	SP		FS	
1	Pang Qing / Tong Jian	China	199.45	1	71.41	1	128.04
2	Meagan Duhamel / Eric Radford	Canada	181.79	3	59.92	2	121.87
3	Paige Lawrence / Rudi Swiegers	Canada	171.73	2	59.98	4	111.75
4	Caitlin Yankowskas / John Coughlin	United States	166.97	4	55.25	5	111.72
5	Kirsten Moore-Towers / Dylan Moscovitch	Canada	166.22	5	54.41	3	111.81
6	Amanda Evora / Mark Ladwig	United States	157.30	6	52.23	6	105.07
7	Narumi Takahashi / Mervin Tran	Japan	152.63	8	50.25	7	102.38
8	Mary Beth Marley / Rockne Brubaker	United States	144.46	10	45.60	8	98.86
9	Zhang Yue / Wang Lei	China	138.93	7	50.61	10	88.32
10	Dong Huibo / Wu Yiming	China	135.10	9	46.41	9	88.69

=== Ice dancing ===
After winning the short program, Virtue / Moir had to withdraw because of an injury to Virtue.

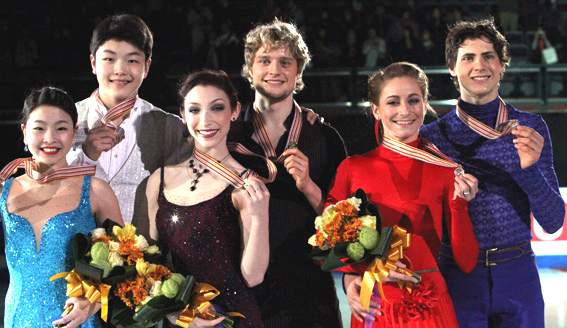
Ice dancing podium

Rank	Name	Nation	Total points	SD		FD	
1	Meryl Davis / Charlie White	United States	172.03	2	69.01	1	103.02
2	Maia Shibutani / Alex Shibutani	United States	155.38	4	62.04	2	93.34
3	Vanessa Crone / Paul Poirier	Canada	151.83	5	61.66	3	90.17
4	Kaitlyn Weaver / Andrew Poje	Canada	151.14	3	65.45	4	85.69
5	Madison Chock / Greg Zuerlein	United States	142.44	6	57.14	5	85.30
6	Huang Xintong / Zheng Xun	China	130.29	7	52.93	6	77.36
7	Yu Xiaoyang / Wang Chen	China	125.75	8	50.58	7	75.17
8	Guan Xueting / Wang Meng	China	106.26	9	42.77	8	63.49
9	Danielle O'Brien / Gregory Merriman	Australia	104.69	10	42.67	9	62.02
10	Corenne Bruhns / Benjamin Westenberger	Mexico	88.55	11	40.68	10	47.87
11	Maria Borounov / Evgeni Borounov	Australia	72.23	12	28.52	11	43.71
WD	Tessa Virtue / Scott Moir	Canada		1	69.40	WD	

- WD: Withdrew

== See also ==
- List of sporting events in Taiwan
