= 2012 Four Continents Figure Skating Championships =

2012 Four Continents Championships
- Type: ISU Championship
- Date: February 7 – 12
- Season: 2011–12
- Location: Colorado Springs, USA
- Venue: World Arena

Champions
- Men's singles: (Canada) Patrick Chan
- Ladies' singles: (United States) Ashley Wagner
- Pairs: (China) Sui Wenjing / Han Cong
- Ice dance: (Canada) Tessa Virtue / Scott Moir
- Previous: 2011 Four Continents Championships
- Next: 2013 Four Continents Championships

The 2012 Four Continents Figure Skating Championships was an international figure skating competition in the 2011–12 season. It was held at the World Arena in Colorado Springs, USA on February 7–12. Medals were awarded in the disciplines of men's singles, ladies' singles, pair skating, and ice dancing.

== Qualification ==
The competition was open to skaters from a non-European member nation of the International Skating Union who reached the age of 15 before July 1, 2011. The corresponding competition for European skaters was the 2012 European Championships.

== Entries ==
The entries were as follows. Jeremy Abbott withdrew due to injury and was replaced by Richard Dornbush.

Country	Men	Ladies	Pairs	Ice dancing
Australia	Brendan Kerry; Mark Webster; Nicholas Fernandez	Chantelle Kerry; Jaimee Nobbs; Zara Pasfield		Danielle O'Brien / Gregory Merriman
Brazil	Kevin Alves; Luiz Manella			
Canada	Kevin Reynolds; Patrick Chan; Jeremy Ten	Amélie Lacoste; Cynthia Phaneuf; Alexandra Najarro	Meagan Duhamel / Eric Radford; Paige Lawrence / Rudi Swiegers; Jessica Dubé / Sébastien Wolfe	Alexandra Paul / Mitchell Islam; Tessa Virtue / Scott Moir; Kaitlyn Weaver / Andrew Poje
China	Guan Jinlin; Song Nan; Wu Jialiang	Geng Bingwa; Zhu Qiuying; Zhang Kexin	Dong Huibo / Wu Yiming; Sui Wenjing / Han Cong; Zhang Yue / Wang Lei	Yu Xiaoyang / Wang Chen
Chinese Taipei	Jordan Ju; Wun-Chang Shih	Crystal Kiang; Chaochih Liu; Melinda Wang		
Hong Kong	Harry Hau Yin Lee			
Japan	Tatsuki Machida; Takahito Mura; Daisuke Takahashi	Haruka Imai; Mao Asada; Kanako Murakami	Narumi Takahashi / Mervin Tran	
Kazakhstan	Abzal Rakimgaliev; Denis Ten			Cortney Mansour / Daryn Zhunussov
Mexico		Reyna Hamui		Corenne Bruhns / Ryan Van Natten
Philippines	Christopher Caluza; Maverick Eguia	Mericien Venzon; Zhaira Costiniano		
Puerto Rico		Victoria Muniz		
Singapore		Brittany Lau		
South Africa		Lejeanne Marais		
South Korea	Kim Min-seok; Alex Kang-chan Kam; Kim Hwan-jin	Suhr Chae-yeon; Kwak Min-jeong; Yun Yea-ji		
Thailand		Mimi Tanasorn Chindasook; Sandra Khopon; Melanie Swang		
United States	Richard Dornbush; Ross Miner; Adam Rippon	Ashley Wagner; Agnes Zawadzki; Caroline Zhang	Amanda Evora / Mark Ladwig; Mary Beth Marley / Rockne Brubaker; Caydee Denney / John Coughlin	Madison Hubbell / Zachary Donohue; Meryl Davis / Charlie White; Maia Shibutani / Alex Shibutani
Uzbekistan	Misha Ge			Anna Nagornyuk / Viktor Kovalenko

== Results ==
=== Men ===
Rank	Name	Nation	Total points	SP		FS	
1	Patrick Chan	Canada	273.94	1	87.95	1	185.99
2	Daisuke Takahashi	Japan	244.33	3	82.59	2	161.74
3	Ross Miner	United States	223.23	6	76.89	4	146.34
4	Adam Rippon	United States	221.55	7	74.92	3	146.63
5	Takahito Mura	Japan	217.16	2	83.44	6	133.72
6	Denis Ten	Kazakhstan	210.03	5	77.73	7	132.30
7	Tatsuki Machida	Japan	208.04	4	82.37	10	125.67
8	Kevin Reynolds	Canada	203.26	9	68.22	5	135.04
9	Misha Ge	Uzbekistan	196.53	11	64.49	8	132.04
10	Guan Jinlin	China	196.53	10	66.36	9	130.17
11	Song Nan	China	190.51	8	69.34	11	121.17
12	Christopher Caluza	Philippines	172.60	14	58.02	12	114.58
13	Richard Dornbush	United States	164.29	13	61.34	14	102.95
14	Jeremy Ten	Canada	159.22	12	61.37	18	97.85
15	Kim Min-seok	South Korea	157.14	21	49.39	13	107.75
16	Wu Jialiang	China	156.62	15	56.19	17	100.43
17	Alex Kang-chan Kam	South Korea	154.07	16	52.12	15	101.95
18	Abzal Rakimgaliev	Kazakhstan	153.63	17	52.10	16	101.53
19	Brendan Kerry	Australia	144.26	23	47.01	19	97.25
20	Mark Webster	Australia	138.87	18	50.88	20	87.99
21	Jordan Ju	Chinese Taipei	134.97	20	49.49	22	85.48
22	Luiz Manella	Brazil	133.07	19	50.17	24	82.90
23	Kevin Alves	Brazil	132.94	22	47.96	23	84.98
24	Nicholas Fernandez	Australia	131.76	24	44.57	21	87.19
Did not advance to free skating
25	Harry Hau Yin Lee	Hong Kong		25	42.00		
26	Maverick Eguia	Philippines		26	41.63		
27	Wun-Chang Shih	Chinese Taipei		27	37.27		
28	Hwan-Jin Kim	South Korea		28	36.95		

=== Ladies ===
Rank	Name	Nation	Total points	SP		FS	
1	Ashley Wagner	United States	192.41	2	64.07	1	128.34
2	Mao Asada	Japan	188.62	1	64.25	2	124.37
3	Caroline Zhang	United States	176.18	4	58.74	3	117.44
4	Kanako Murakami	Japan	169.32	3	63.45	5	105.87
5	Zhang Kexin	China	162.59	5	54.07	4	108.52
6	Agnes Zawadzki	United States	157.23	6	52.87	6	104.36
7	Amélie Lacoste	Canada	147.65	7	51.72	8	95.93
8	Cynthia Phaneuf	Canada	147.47	8	50.76	7	96.71
9	Haruka Imai	Japan	134.49	11	45.19	9	89.30
10	Kwak Min-jeong	South Korea	130.52	9	48.72	10	81.80
11	Geng Bingwa	China	127.89	10	46.98	11	80.91
12	Victoria Muniz	Puerto Rico	117.83	12	42.63	13	75.20
13	Alexandra Najarro	Canada	117.11	14	37.08	12	80.03
14	Melinda Wang	Chinese Taipei	103.69	18	35.35	15	68.34
15	Sandra Khopon	Thailand	103.15	17	35.58	16	67.57
16	Zhu Qiuying	China	102.77	16	36.43	17	66.34
17	Chantelle Kerry	Australia	102.49	20	32.28	14	70.21
18	Mimi Tanasorn Chindasook	Thailand	97.19	13	37.23	22	59.96
19	Yun Yea-ji	South Korea	96.85	19	32.46	19	64.39
20	Melanie Swang	Thailand	96.16	22	31.21	18	64.95
21	Suhr Chae-yeon	South Korea	94.95	15	36.54	23	58.41
22	Lejeanne Marais	South Africa	94.34	21	32.15	21	62.19
23	Crystal Kiang	Chinese Taipei	93.79	23	30.91	20	62.88
24	Zhaira Costiniano	Philippines	87.26	24	30.33	24	56.93
Did not advance to free skating
25	Reyna Hamui	Mexico		25	29.84		
26	Chaochih Liu	Chinese Taipei		26	29.07		
27	Mericien Venzon	Philippines		27	28.91		
28	Brittany Lau	Singapore		28	28.79		
29	Zara Pasfield	Australia		29	28.14		
30	Jaimee Nobbs	Australia		30	26.33		

=== Pairs ===
Rank	Name	Nation	Total points	SP		FS	
1	Sui Wenjing / Han Cong	China	201.83	1	66.75	1	135.08
2	Caydee Denney / John Coughlin	United States	185.42	2	63.35	2	122.07
3	Mary Beth Marley / Rockne Brubaker	United States	178.89	3	62.42	3	116.47
4	Meagan Duhamel / Eric Radford	Canada	171.76	8	57.53	4	114.23
5	Narumi Takahashi / Mervin Tran	Japan	171.11	4	61.54	5	109.57
6	Amanda Evora / Mark Ladwig	United States	167.99	5	60.75	6	107.24
7	Paige Lawrence / Rudi Swiegers	Canada	158.66	6	57.97	7	100.69
8	Jessica Dubé / Sébastien Wolfe	Canada	154.79	7	57.68	8	97.11
9	Zhang Yue / Wang Lei	China	140.24	10	48.04	9	92.20
10	Dong Huibo / Wu Yiming	China	137.91	9	49.52	10	88.39

=== Ice dancing ===
Rank	Name	Nation	Total points	SD		FD	
1	Tessa Virtue / Scott Moir	Canada	182.84	2	71.60	1	111.24
2	Meryl Davis / Charlie White	United States	179.40	1	72.15	2	107.25
3	Kaitlyn Weaver / Andrew Poje	Canada	163.26	3	64.23	3	99.03
4	Maia Shibutani / Alex Shibutani	United States	158.29	4	63.38	4	94.91
5	Madison Hubbell / Zachary Donohue	United States	129.20	5	49.93	5	79.27
6	Alexandra Paul / Mitchell Islam	Canada	117.97	6	48.52	7	69.45
7	Yu Xiaoyang / Wang Chen	China	115.05	7	45.42	6	69.63
8	Anna Nagornyuk / Viktor Kovalenko	Uzbekistan	107.61	9	39.93	8	67.68
9	Danielle O'Brien / Gregory Merriman	Australia	105.91	8	40.10	9	65.81
10	Corenne Bruhns / Ryan Van Natten	Mexico	91.57	10	35.93	10	55.64
11	Cortney Mansour / Daryn Zhunussov	Kazakhstan	78.66	11	25.53	11	53.13

== Medals summary ==
=== Medalists ===
Medals for overall placement:

Discipline	Gold	Silver	Bronze
Men	(Canada) Patrick Chan	(Japan) Daisuke Takahashi	(United States) Ross Miner
Ladies	(United States) Ashley Wagner	(Japan) Mao Asada	(United States) Caroline Zhang
Pair skating	(China) Sui Wenjing / Han Cong	(United States) Caydee Denney / John Coughlin	(United States) Mary Beth Marley / Rockne Brubaker
Ice dancing	(Canada) Tessa Virtue / Scott Moir	(United States) Meryl Davis / Charlie White	(Canada) Kaitlyn Weaver / Andrew Poje

Small medals for placement in the short segment:

Discipline	Gold	Silver	Bronze
Men	(Canada) Patrick Chan	(Japan) Takahito Mura	(Japan) Daisuke Takahashi
Ladies	(Japan) Mao Asada	(United States) Ashley Wagner	(Japan) Kanako Murakami
Pair skating	(China) Sui Wenjing / Han Cong	(United States) Caydee Denney / John Coughlin	(United States) Mary Beth Marley / Rockne Brubaker
Ice dancing	(United States) Meryl Davis / Charlie White	(Canada) Tessa Virtue / Scott Moir	(Canada) Kaitlyn Weaver / Andrew Poje

Small medals for placement in the free segment:

Discipline	Gold	Silver	Bronze
Men	(Canada) Patrick Chan	(Japan) Daisuke Takahashi	(United States) Adam Rippon
Ladies	(United States) Ashley Wagner	(Japan) Mao Asada	(United States) Caroline Zhang
Pair skating	(China) Sui Wenjing / Han Cong	(United States) Caydee Denney / John Coughlin	(United States) Mary Beth Marley / Rockne Brubaker
Ice dancing	(Canada) Tessa Virtue / Scott Moir	(United States) Meryl Davis / Charlie White	(Canada) Kaitlyn Weaver / Andrew Poje

=== Medals by country ===
Table of medals for overall placement:

Rank	Nation	Gold	Silver	Bronze	Total
1	Canada (CAN)	2	0	1	3
2	United States (USA)	1	2	3	6
3	China (CHN)	1	0	0	1
4	Japan (JPN)	0	2	0	2
Totals (4 entries)		4	4	4	12
