= 2010 Four Continents Figure Skating Championships =

2010 Four Continents Championships
- Type: ISU Championship
- Date: January 27 – 30
- Season: 2009–10
- Location: Jeonju, South Korea
- Host: Korea Skating Union
- Venue: Hwasan Ice Arena

Champions
- Men's singles: (United States) Adam Rippon
- Ladies' singles: (Japan) Mao Asada
- Pairs: (China) Zhang Dan / Zhang Hao
- Ice dance: (Canada) Kaitlyn Weaver / Andrew Poje
- Previous: 2009 Four Continents Championships
- Next: 2011 Four Continents Championships

The 2010 Four Continents Figure Skating Championships was an international figure skating competition in the 2009–10 season. It was held at the Hwasan Ice Arena in Jeonju, South Korea on January 27–30. Medals were awarded in the disciplines of men's singles, ladies' singles, pair skating, and ice dancing.

== Qualification ==
The competition was open to skaters from a non-European member nation of the International Skating Union. The countries that were eligible to send skaters to the competition were Argentina, Australia, Brazil, Canada, China, Chinese Taipei, DPR Korea, Hong Kong, India, Japan, Kazakhstan, Mexico, Mongolia, New Zealand, Philippines, Puerto Rico, Republic of Korea, Singapore, South Africa, Thailand, United States of America, and Uzbekistan. The corresponding competition for European skaters was the 2010 European Figure Skating Championships.

Unlike the other three ISU championships, each nation was allowed to enter 3 skaters/couples in each event, regardless of its skaters performance in the previous year's championships. Skaters must have reached the age of 15 by July 1, 2009 in order to compete.

== Schedule ==
All times are Korea Standard Time (UTC+9).

- Wednesday, January 27
  - 11:20 Ice dancing – Compulsory dance
  - 13:30 Pairs – Short program
  - 15:45 Opening ceremony
  - 16:30 Ladies – Short program
- Thursday, January 28
  - 12:00 Ice dancing – Original dance
  - 14:20 Pairs – Free skating
  - 17:30 Men – Short program
- Friday, January 29
  - 13:00 Ladies – Free skating
  - 18:00 Ice dancing – Free dance
- Saturday, January 30
  - 11:00 Men – Free skating
  - 17:00 Gala exhibition

== Results ==
=== Men ===
Rank	Name	Nation	Total points	SP		FS	
1	Adam Rippon	United States	225.78	7	69.56	1	156.22
2	Tatsuki Machida	Japan	217.48	6	69.60	2	147.88
3	Kevin Reynolds	Canada	212.99	1	81.60	8	131.39
4	Brandon Mroz	United States	212.68	3	70.88	5	141.80
5	Ryan Bradley	United States	212.19	8	66.22	3	145.97
6	Song Nan	China	209.68	2	72.95	6	136.73
7	Shawn Sawyer	Canada	206.34	10	62.36	4	143.98
8	Wu Jialiang	China	203.60	5	70.33	7	133.27
9	Guan Jinlin	China	195.66	9	64.60	9	131.06
10	Denis Ten	Kazakhstan	172.65	4	70.50	14	102.15
11	Joey Russell	Canada	171.44	12	57.05	10	114.39
12	Yasuharu Nanri	Japan	171.36	11	61.48	11	109.88
13	Abzal Rakimgaliev	Kazakhstan	156.91	13	55.91	15	101.00
14	Kim Min-seok	South Korea	153.09	16	49.49	12	103.60
15	Kento Nakamura	Japan	152.69	17	49.24	13	103.45
16	Stephen Li-Chung Kuo	Chinese Taipei	148.96	14	53.80	16	95.16
17	Kevin Alves	Brazil	130.76	19	41.81	17	88.95
18	Mark Webster	Australia	129.73	15	51.05	19	78.68
19	Matthew Precious	Australia	127.09	18	47.44	18	79.65
20	Wun-Chang Shih	Chinese Taipei	101.87	20	40.53	20	61.34
Did not advance to free skating
21	Nicholas Fernandez	Australia		21	35.43		
22	Charles Shou-San Pao	Chinese Taipei		22	35.10		
23	Humberto Contreras	Mexico		23	33.27		
24	Seo Min-seok	South Korea		24	30.42		
25	Hau Yin Lee	Hong Kong		25	27.87		
26	Hon Lam To	Hong Kong		26	27.46		
27	Cameron Hems	New Zealand		27	25.35		

=== Ladies ===
Rank	Name	Nation	Total points	SP		FS	
1	Mao Asada	Japan	183.96	3	57.22	1	126.74
2	Akiko Suzuki	Japan	173.72	1	58.88	2	114.84
3	Caroline Zhang	United States	160.78	4	55.10	3	105.68
4	Amanda Dobbs	United States	158.23	2	57.56	5	100.67
5	Haruka Imai	Japan	155.29	5	55.06	6	100.23
6	Kwak Min-jeong	South Korea	154.71	7	53.68	4	101.03
7	Amélie Lacoste	Canada	152.45	6	54.46	8	97.99
8	Myriane Samson	Canada	150.90	8	51.60	7	99.30
9	Alexe Gilles	United States	140.88	9	48.90	9	91.98
10	Diane Szmiett	Canada	140.10	10	48.82	10	91.28
11	Anastasia Gimazetdinova	Uzbekistan	134.15	11	46.88	11	87.27
12	Liu Yan	China	126.11	12	46.60	13	79.51
13	Kim Chae-hwa	South Korea	123.91	14	41.34	12	82.57
14	Cheltzie Lee	Australia	119.39	15	40.06	14	79.33
15	Kim Na-young	South Korea	109.46	13	44.94	17	64.52
16	Lejeanne Marais	South Africa	103.03	19	34.32	15	68.71
17	Ana Cecilia Cantu	Mexico	101.25	17	35.62	16	65.63
18	Crystal Kiang	Chinese Taipei	96.16	16	36.18	19	59.98
19	Melinda Wang	Chinese Taipei	95.50	20	33.82	18	61.68
20	Lauren Ko	Philippines	90.77	18	35.22	20	55.55
Did not advance to free skating
21	Xu Binshu	China		21	33.82		
22	Phoebe Di Tommaso	Australia		22	33.48		
23	Tamami Ono	Hong Kong		23	33.26		
24	Mericien Venzon	Philippines		24	32.92		
25	Sandra Khopon	Thailand		25	32.84		
26	Mary Ro Reyes	Mexico		26	32.76		
27	Gracielle Jeanne Tan	Philippines		27	32.22		
28	Tiffany Packard Yu	Hong Kong		28	30.74		
29	Abigail Pietersen	South Africa		29	30.06		
30	Chaochih Liu	Chinese Taipei		30	29.92		
31	Charissa Tansomboon	Thailand		31	29.88		
32	Sarah Paw Si Ying	Singapore		32	27.32		
33	Taryn Jurgensen	Thailand		33	26.94		
34	Priscila Alavez	Mexico		34	24.92		
35	Elena Rodrigues	Brazil		35	24.74		
36	Alessia Baldo	Brazil		36	24.00		
37	Tze Ching Lee	Hong Kong		37	23.48		
38	Simone Pastusiak	Brazil		38	17.70		

=== Pairs ===
Rank	Name	Nation	Total points	SP		FS	
1	Zhang Dan / Zhang Hao	China	192.22	1	65.86	1	126.36
2	Keauna McLaughlin / Rockne Brubaker	United States	170.17	2	64.56	2	105.61
3	Meagan Duhamel / Craig Buntin	Canada	158.02	3	56.90	4	101.12
4	Caitlin Yankowskas / John Coughlin	United States	157.49	4	56.10	3	101.39
5	Narumi Takahashi / Mervin Tran	Japan	151.83	7	53.74	5	98.09
6	Zhang Yue / Wang Lei	China	146.60	6	54.16	6	92.44
7	Mylène Brodeur / John Mattatall	Canada	146.31	5	55.94	7	90.37
8	Dong Huibo / Wu Yiming	China	136.05	9	48.02	8	88.03
9	Kirsten Moore-Towers / Dylan Moscovitch	Canada	135.76	8	48.76	9	87.00
10	Marissa Castelli / Simon Shnapir	United States	128.91	10	44.60	10	84.31
11	Amanda Sunyoto-Yang / Darryll Sulindro-Yang	Chinese Taipei	116.49	11	43.42	11	73.07

=== Ice dancing ===
Rank	Name	Nation	Total points	CD		OD		FD	
1	Kaitlyn Weaver / Andrew Poje	Canada	166.16	1	32.67	1	48.42	1	85.07
2	Allie Hann-McCurdy / Michael Coreno	Canada	159.56	3	29.89	2	48.21	2	81.46
3	Madison Hubbell / Keiffer Hubbell	United States	154.20	4	29.76	4	46.75	4	77.69
4	Huang Xintong / Zheng Xun	China	150.38	2	30.12	3	47.21	7	73.05
5	Madison Chock / Greg Zuerlein	United States	148.92	5	29.14	5	44.12	5	75.66
6	Kharis Ralph / Asher Hill	Canada	147.38	7	26.57	8	41.80	3	79.01
7	Jane Summersett / Todd Gilles	United States	144.53	8	25.26	6	43.95	6	75.32
8	Yu Xiaoyang / Wang Chen	China	141.55	6	28.16	7	42.48	8	70.91
9	Guan Xueting / Wang Meng	China	127.06	9	21.64	9	40.53	9	64.89
10	Danielle O'Brien / Gregory Merriman	Australia	115.73	10	21.12	11	33.90	10	60.71
11	Corenne Bruhns / Andrew Lavrik	Mexico	106.07	11	17.71	10	34.33	12	54.03
12	Maria Borounov / Evgeni Borounov	Australia	106.03	12	17.22	12	32.32	11	56.49
