= 2009 Four Continents Figure Skating Championships =

2009 Four Continents Championships
- Type: ISU Championship
- Date: February 2 – 8
- Season: 2008–09
- Location: Vancouver, Canada
- Venue: Pacific Coliseum

Champions
- Men's singles: (Canada) Patrick Chan
- Ladies' singles: (South Korea) Kim Yuna
- Pairs: (China) Pang Qing / Tong Jian
- Ice dance: (United States) Meryl Davis / Charlie White
- Previous: 2008 Four Continents Championships
- Next: 2010 Four Continents Championships

The 2009 Four Continents Figure Skating Championships an international figure skating competition in the 2008–09 season. It was held at the Pacific Coliseum in Vancouver, Canada on February 2–8. Medals were awarded in the disciplines of men's singles, ladies' singles, pair skating, and ice dancing. The compulsory dance was the Finnstep.

== Notes ==
Skaters who reached the age of 15 by July 1, 2008, were eligible to compete. Unlike the other three ISU championships, each nation was allowed three entries in each discipline, regardless of its skaters' performance in the previous year's championships. The corresponding competition for European skaters was the 2009 European Figure Skating Championships.

This event served as the Olympic test event for figure skating for the 2010 Vancouver Olympic Winter Games although the rink was NHL-sized.

== Schedule ==
(Local Time, UTC−8)

- Wednesday, February 4
  - 13:00 Ice dancing – Compulsory dance
  - 15:15 Pairs – Short program
  - 17:30 Opening ceremony
  - 18:15 Ladies – Short program
- Thursday, February 5
  - 11:00 Ice dancing – Original dance
  - 13:35 Pairs – Free skating
  - 16:30 Men – Short program
- Friday, February 6
  - 13:45 Ice dancing – Free dance
  - 18:00 Ladies – Free skating
- Saturday, February 7
  - 10:45 Men – Free skating
- Sunday, February 8
  - 12:00: Gala exhibition

== Results ==
=== Men ===
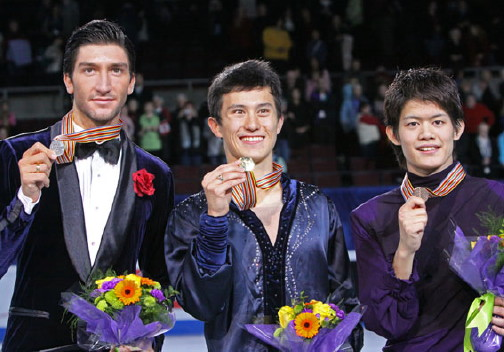
The men's podium. From left: Evan Lysacek (2nd), Patrick Chan (1st), Takahiko Kozuka (3rd).

Rank	Name	Nation	Total points	SP		FS	
1	Patrick Chan	Canada	249.19	1	88.90	1	160.29
2	Evan Lysacek	United States	237.15	2	81.65	2	155.50
3	Takahiko Kozuka	Japan	221.76	3	76.61	4	145.15
4	Nobunari Oda	Japan	220.26	6	75.04	3	145.22
5	Jeremy Abbott	United States	216.94	4	75.67	6	141.27
6	Vaughn Chipeur	Canada	212.81	7	68.00	5	144.81
7	Jeremy Ten	Canada	207.27	9	66.60	7	140.67
8	Brandon Mroz	United States	196.78	5	75.05	9	121.73
9	Denis Ten	Kazakhstan	184.82	10	61.32	8	123.50
10	Wu Jialiang	China	182.92	8	67.75	11	115.17
11	Li Chengjiang	China	178.94	12	59.22	10	119.72
12	Yasuharu Nanri	Japan	157.91	11	59.44	13	98.47
13	Gao Song	China	155.45	13	58.74	14	96.71
14	Abzal Rakimgaliev	Kazakhstan	152.67	14	53.65	12	99.02
15	Mark Webster	Australia	123.08	17	43.93	15	79.15
16	Kevin Alves	Brazil	121.97	16	43.97	16	78.00
17	Luis Hernández	Mexico	118.70	15	44.66	18	74.04
18	Robert McNamara	Australia	116.47	18	41.59	17	74.88
19	Kim Min-seok	South Korea	108.75	19	41.04	21	67.71
20	Justin Pietersen	South Africa	106.26	22	34.48	19	71.78
21	Nicholas Fernandez	Australia	105.54	21	37.64	20	67.90
22	Charles Shou-San Pao	Chinese Taipei	96.37	23	34.45	23	61.92
23	Humberto Contreras	Mexico	96.10	20	39.87	24	56.23
24	Wun-Chang Shih	Chinese Taipei	96.04	24	31.52	22	64.52
Did not advance to free skating
25	Mathieu Wilson	New Zealand		25	31.15		
26	Sebra Yen	Chinese Taipei		26	31.05		

=== Ladies ===
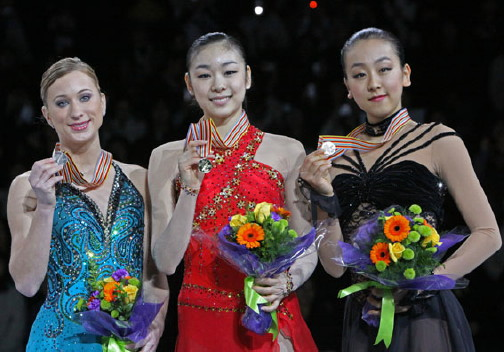
The ladies' podium. From left: Joannie Rochette (2nd), Kim Yuna (1st), Mao Asada (3rd).

Kim Yuna set a new world record for the short program.

Rank	Name	Nation	Total points	SP		FS	
1	Kim Yuna	South Korea	189.07	1	72.24	3	116.83
2	Joannie Rochette	Canada	183.91	2	66.90	2	117.01
3	Mao Asada	Japan	176.52	6	57.86	1	118.66
4	Caroline Zhang	United States	171.22	5	58.16	4	113.06
5	Cynthia Phaneuf	Canada	169.41	3	60.98	5	108.43
6	Fumie Suguri	Japan	167.74	4	60.18	6	107.56
7	Rachael Flatt	United States	162.83	8	55.44	7	107.39
8	Akiko Suzuki	Japan	160.36	9	55.40	8	104.96
9	Alissa Czisny	United States	159.81	7	55.62	9	104.19
10	Amélie Lacoste	Canada	146.18	10	49.78	10	96.40
11	Liu Yan	China	139.50	12	47.60	11	91.90
12	Anastasia Gimazetdinova	Uzbekistan	125.39	13	46.22	14	79.17
13	Cheltzie Lee	Australia	123.88	15	43.96	13	79.92
14	Kim Hyeon-jung	South Korea	121.64	17	41.64	12	80.00
15	Xu Binshu	China	121.00	11	48.38	16	72.62
16	Kim Na-young	South Korea	120.28	16	43.94	15	76.34
17	Ana Cecilia Cantu	Mexico	108.75	14	44.82	18	63.93
18	Tina Wang	Australia	108.02	18	37.64	17	70.38
19	Chaochih Liu	Chinese Taipei	97.51	19	37.20	19	60.31
20	Tamami Ono	Hong Kong	91.89	24	33.80	20	58.09
21	Michele Cantu	Mexico	90.08	20	37.16	22	52.92
22	Loretta Hamui	Mexico	87.64	23	33.84	21	53.80
23	Wang Yueren	China	85.04	21	34.38	23	50.66
24	Gracielle Jeanne Tan	Philippines	80.37	22	34.02	24	46.35
Did not advance to free skating
25	Crystal Kiang	Chinese Taipei		25	32.52		
26	Melinda Wang	Chinese Taipei		26	31.64		
27	Charissa Tansomboon	Thailand		27	31.58		
28	Lejeanne Marais	South Africa		28	31.32		
29	Mary Grace Baldo	Philippines		29	29.18		
30	Jessica Kurzawski	Australia		30	28.94		
31	Elizabeth Stern	Philippines		31	27.58		
32	Abigail Pietersen	South Africa		32	27.32		
33	Alessia Baldo	Brazil		33	26.36		
34	Stacy Perfetti	Brazil		34	24.44		
35	Kristine Y Lee	Hong Kong		35	23.76		
WD	Megan Allely	South Africa					

=== Pairs ===
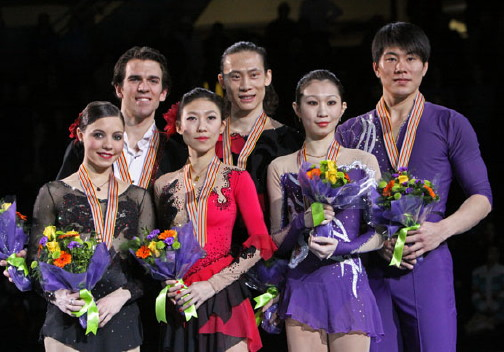
The pairs' podium. From left: Jessica Dubé / Bryce Davison (2nd), Pang Qing / Tong Jian (1st), Zhang Dan / Zhang Hao (3rd).

Rank	Name	Nation	Total points	SP		FS	
1	Pang Qing / Tong Jian	China	194.94	1	65.60	1	129.34
2	Jessica Dubé / Bryce Davison	Canada	185.62	2	64.36	2	121.26
3	Zhang Dan / Zhang Hao	China	174.98	3	63.20	3	111.78
4	Meagan Duhamel / Craig Buntin	Canada	168.43	4	62.08	6	106.35
5	Keauna McLaughlin / Rockne Brubaker	United States	164.01	7	54.16	4	109.85
6	Caydee Denney / Jeremy Barrett	United States	161.69	8	53.60	5	108.09
7	Rena Inoue / John Baldwin	United States	157.38	5	56.78	7	100.60
8	Mylène Brodeur / John Mattatall	Canada	149.85	6	55.16	8	94.69
9	Dong Huibo / Wu Yiming	China	143.33	9	52.40	9	90.93
10	Amanda Sunyoto-Yang / Darryll Sulindro-Yang	Chinese Taipei	126.73	10	43.38	10	83.35
11	Marina Aganina / Dmitri Zobnin	Uzbekistan	102.52	11	36.88	11	65.64

=== Ice dancing ===
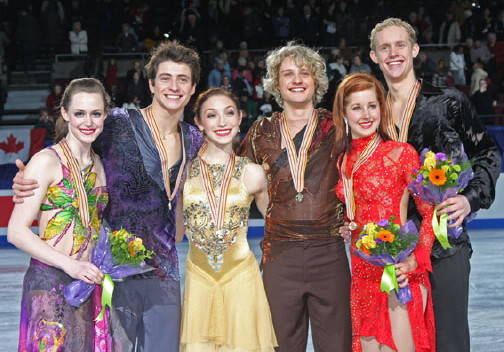
The ice dancing podium. From left: Tessa Virtue / Scott Moir (2nd), Meryl Davis / Charlie White (1st), Emily Samuelson / Evan Bates (3rd).

Rank	Name	Nation	Total points	CD		OD		FD	
1	Meryl Davis / Charlie White	United States	192.39	2	35.23	2	60.42	1	96.74
2	Tessa Virtue / Scott Moir	Canada	191.81	1	36.40	1	60.90	2	94.51
3	Emily Samuelson / Evan Bates	United States	180.79	4	31.41	3	59.48	3	89.90
4	Vanessa Crone / Paul Poirier	Canada	176.82	3	32.43	4	56.36	4	88.03
5	Kaitlyn Weaver / Andrew Poje	Canada	168.76	5	30.62	5	53.33	5	84.81
6	Kimberly Navarro / Brent Bommentre	United States	151.82	6	30.59	6	47.59	6	73.64
7	Huang Xintong / Zheng Xun	China	142.30	7	27.56	7	46.95	8	67.79
8	Yu Xiaoyang / Wang Chen	China	137.90	8	24.65	8	42.12	7	71.13
9	Wang Jiayue / Gao Chongbo	China	132.53	9	23.31	9	41.74	9	67.48
10	Danielle O'Brien / Gregory Merriman	Australia	112.93	10	19.70	10	36.13	10	57.10
11	Maria Borounov / Evgeni Borounov	Australia	101.35	11	17.51	11	31.15	11	52.69
WD	Cathy Reed / Chris Reed	Japan							
