= Chinese Taipei Figure Skating Championships =

Recurring figure skating competition

- Status: Active
- Genre: National championships
- Frequency: Annual
- Location: Taipei City
- Country: Republic of China
- Organizer: Chinese Taipei Skating Union

The Chinese Taipei Figure Skating Championships are held annually to determine the national champions of Taiwan, which uses the name Chinese Taipei when participating in international sporting events. Skaters compete in men's singles, women's singles, and pair skating, although every discipline may not necessarily be held every year due to a lack of participants. The event is organized by the Chinese Taipei Skating Union, the sport's national governing body.

== Senior medalists ==
=== Men's singles ===
Men's event medalists
Season	Gold	Silver	Bronze	Ref.
1999–2000	Benedict Wu			
2000–01	Kevin Lee	Peter Lee	William Rogers	
2001–02	Benedict Wu			
2002–03	Peter Lee	Benedict Wu	Andy Chen	
2003–04	Peter Lee	Andy Chen	Tien Hung-wen	
2004–05	Andy Chen	Shih-Hao Lu	Wun-Chang Shih	
2005–06	Henry Lu	Wun-Chang Shih	Tien Hung-wen	
2006–07			Tien Hung-wen	
2007–08	Wun-Chang Shih	Henry Lu Shih-Hao	Tien Hung-wen	
2008–09	Charles Pao	Wun-Chang Shih	Stephen Kuo	
2009–10	Stephen Kuo	Wun-Chang Shih	Sebra Yen	
2010–11	Stephen Kuo	Jordan Ju	Wun-Chang Shih	
2011–12	Jordan Ju	Wun-Chang Shih	Stephen Kuo	
2012–13	Jordan Ju	Tien Hung-wen	No other competitors	
2013–14	Tsao Chih-i	Chen Jui-Shu	No other competitors	
2014–15	Tsao Chih-i	Chen Jui-Shu	No other competitors	
2015–16	Tsao Chih-i	Lee Meng-Ju	No other competitors	
2016–17	Tsao Chih-i	Lee Meng-Ju	No other competitors	
2017–18	Tsao Chih-i	Lee Meng-Ju	Chang Chih-Sheng	
2018–19	Tsao Chih-i	Chang Chih-Sheng	Micah Tang	
2019–20	Tsao Chih-i	Micah Tang	No other competitors	
2020–21	Yu Che Yu	No other competitors		
2021–22	Yu Che Yu	No other competitors		
2022–23	Yu Che Yu	Lin Fang-Yi	No other competitors	
2023–24	Yu Che Yu	Lin Fang-Yi	Yu Chun Huang	
2024–25	Li Yu-Hsiang	Yeh Che Yu	No other competitors	
2025–26	No men's singles competitors			

=== Women’s singles ===
Women's event medalists
Season	Gold	Silver	Bronze	Ref.
1999–2000	Carina Chen	Diane Chen		
2000–01	Carina Chen	Diane Chen	Dow-Jane Chi	
2001–02	Carina Chen	Diane Chen	Diana Y. Chen	
2002–03	Diana Y. Chen	Jennifer Lee	Anny Hou	
2003–04	Diane Chen	Tiffany Chung	Anny Hou	
2004–05	Diane Chen	Tiffany Chung	Shirley Tsai	
2005–06	Jennifer Don	Jocelyn Ho	Diane Chen	
2006–07	Melinda Wang	Chaochih Liu	Sigrid Young	
2007–08	Melinda Wang	Chaochih Liu	Sigrid Young	
2008–09	Chaochih Liu	Melinda Wang	Sigrid Young	
2009–10	Melinda Wang	Crystal Kiang	Chaochih Liu	
2010–11	Melinda Wang	Crystal Kiang	Chaochih Liu	
2011–12	Melinda Wang	Crystal Kiang	Chaochih Liu	
2012–13	Crystal Kiang	Melinda Wang	Corinna Lin	
2013–14	Melanie Chang	Lu Pei-Xuan	Stephanie Hsieh	
2014–15	Lu Pei-Xuan	No other competitors		
2015–16	Amy Lin	Chen Yi-Hsuan	No other competitors	
2016–17	Amy Lin	No other competitors		
2017–18	Amy Lin	Stephanie Chang	Haley Yao	
2018–19	Amy Lin	Yuka Matsuura	Stephanie Chang	
2019–20	Emmy Ma	Jenny Shyu	Erin Lee Ching-an	
2020–21	No women's competitors			
2021–22	Tzu-Han Ting	Juelle Lin Peijin	No other competitors	
2022–23	Tzu-Han Ting	Amanda Hsu	No other competitors	
2023–24	Tzu-Han Ting	Amanda Hsu	No other competitors	
2024–25	Amanda Hsu	Mya Poe	No other competitors	
2025–26	Pin-Jane Chen	No other competitors		

=== Pairs ===
Pairs event medalists
Season	Gold	Silver	Bronze	Ref.
2001–04	No pairs competitors			
2005–06	Amanda Sunyoto-Yang; Darryll Sulindro-Yang	No other competitors		
2006–08	No pairs competitors			
2008–09	Amanda Sunyoto-Yang; Darryll Sulindro-Yang	No other competitors		
2009–10	Amanda Sunyoto-Yang; Darryll Sulindro-Yang	No other competitors		
2010–11	Amanda Sunyoto-Yang; Darryll Sulindro-Yang	No other competitors		

== Junior medalists ==
=== Men’s singles ===
Junior men's event medalists
Season	Gold	Silver	Bronze	Ref.
2008–09	Chen Jui-Shu	No other competitors		
2009–10	Lin Yong-Yue	No other competitors		
2010–11	Tsao Chih-i	Chen Jui-Shu	No other competitors	
2011–12	Tsao Chih-i	Chen Jui-Shu	Lee Meng-Ju	
2012–13	Lee Meng-Ju	Chang Chih-Sheng	No other competitors	
2013–14	Lee Meng-Ju	Chang Chih-Sheng	No other competitors	
2014–15	Lee Meng-Ju	Chang Chih-Sheng	No other competitors	
2015–16	Micah Tang	Chang Shao-Huan	No other competitors	
2016–17	Micah Tang	Chang Chih-Sheng	No other competitors	
2017–18	Yeh Che Yu	Cheng Jen-Yu	No other competitors	
2018–19	Lin Fang-Yi	Elliot Jang	Yeh Che Yu	
2019–20	Lin Fang-Yi	Yeh Che Yu	No other competitors	
2020–21	Li Yu-Hsiang	Guan-Ting Zhou	Huang Yu-Chun	
2021–22	Li Yu-Hsiang	Guan-Ting Zhou	Huang Yu-Chun	
2022–23	Li Yu-Hsiang	Yu-Chun Huang	Zhou Guan-Ting	
2023–24	Li Yu-Hsiang	Wu Bo Shun	Chen Xin Wu	
2024–25	Wu Bo Shun	No other competitors		
2025–26	Wu Bo Shun	No other competitors		

=== Women’s singles ===
Junior women's event medalists
Season	Gold	Silver	Bronze	Ref.
2009–10	Tiffany Wu	Yu-Ting Wang	No other competitors	
2010–11	Stephanie Hsieh	Levana Wu	Lena Wu	
2011–12	Levana Wu	Lena Wu	Pei-Xuan Lu	
2012–13	Lihsueh Lin	Levana Wu	Lena Wu	
2013–14	Lihsueh Lin	Jennifer Hsu	Katrina Wang	
2013–14	Lihsueh Lin	Jennifer Hsu	Katrina Wang	
2014–15	Emma Jang	Lin Lihsueh	Jennifer Hsu	
2015–16	Emma Jang	Yuka Matsuura	Lien Yi-Chen	
2016–17	Haley Yao	Ashley Wang	Emma Jang	
2017–18	Yuka Matsuura	Emma Jang	Fang Jowei	
2018–19	Tzu-Han Ting	Mandy Chiang	Megan Ly	
2019–20	Tzu-Han Ting	Mandy Chiang	Marissa Wu Yi-Shan	
2020–21	Tzu-Han Ting	Chen Chelpin	Lin Yan-Yi	
2021–22	Ou Chia-Yu	Lin Yan-Yi	Audrey Lin	
2022–23	Sadie Weng	Lin Yan-Yi	Audrey Lin	
2023–24	Tsai Yu-feng	Sadie Weng	Chloe Tang	
2024–25	Tsai Yu-feng	Chloe Tang	Lee Fang-Ning	
2025–26	Tsai Yu-feng	Lee Fang-Ning	Chen Chuang-Yuan	

=== Ice dance ===
Junior ice dance event medalists
Season	Gold	Silver	Bronze	Ref.
2024–25	Tasha Shin Hui Lai; Kazuteru Mikki Becker-Pos	No other competitors		

== Records ==
Records
Discipline	Most championship titles			
Discipline	Skater(s)	No.	Years	Ref.
Men's singles	Tsao Chih-i	7	2013-19	
Women's singles	Melinda Wang	5	2006-07; 2009-12	
Pairs	Amanda Sunyoto-Yang; Darryll Sulindro-Yang	4	2005; 2008-10	
