= Rafael Arutyunyan =

Armenian figure skating coach

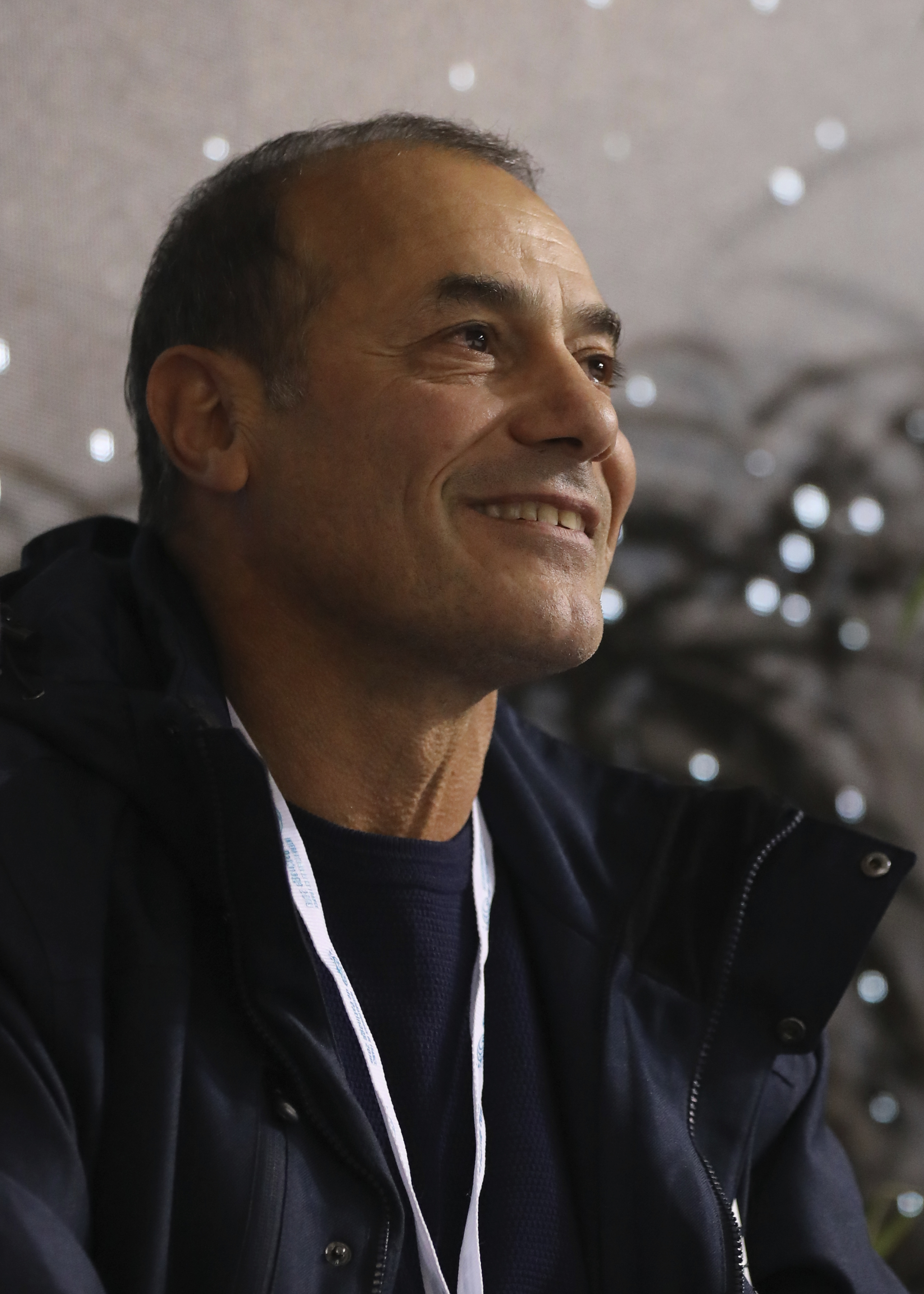
- Arutyunyan in 2019

Personal information
- Full name: Rafael Vladimirovich Arutyunyan
- Other names: Arutunian/Harutyunyan
- Born: July 5, 1957 (age 69) Tbilisi, Georgian SSR, Soviet Union

Rafael Arutyunyan (Armenian: Ռաֆայել Հարությունյան, Harutyunyan; Russian: Рафаэль Владимирович Арутюнян; born July 5, 1957) is an Armenian-American figure skating coach. He has coached in Armenia, Russia and the United States.

== Personal life ==
Arutyunyan was born on July 5, 1957, in Tbilisi, Georgian SSR, and studied in Yerevan, Armenian SSR at the Armenian State Institute of Physical Culture. Arutyunyan's mother brought him to an ice rink after watching figure skating on television; he was skating regularly in Tbilisi by the age of seven. He is married to a skating coach, Vera, and moved to the United States in 2000. They have a son – a pianist born in the mid-1980s, and a daughter, who is an artist. On July 23, 2019, Arutyunyan and his wife became U.S. citizens.

== Coaching career ==
He coached young skaters in Yerevan from 1976. In the 1980–1981 season, one of his students, Saak Mkhitarian, became the Soviet junior champion and placed 6th at the World Junior Championships. Soviet officials then invited Arutyunyan to Moscow, where he worked on his teaching certification and became an assistant to Tatiana Tarasova.

Around 2000 or 2001, Arutyunyan joined the Ice Castle International Training Center, in Lake Arrowhead, California. In August 2013, he relocated to the East West Ice Palace in Artesia, California. He collaborates with his wife, Vera Arutyunyan, and Nadezda Kanaeva. He moved to Lakewood ICE in Lakewood, California on June 25, 2016. In 2019, he took on the role of Head Coach for Higher Performance Team at Great Park Ice & Fivepoint Arena in Irvine, California.

In December 2025, it was announced that Arutyunyan will be inducted into U.S. Figure Skating Hall of Fame's Class 2026, along with his former long-time student, and Olympic gold medalist, Nathan Chen. The induction ceremony was held on January 9, 2026, in St. Louis, Missouri, coinciding with the 2026 U.S. Figure Skating Championships.

His current students include:

- Sofia Bezkorovainaya (United States) (2025 – present)
- David Bondar (Canada) (2025 – present)
- Eliška Březinová (Czech Republic) (2025 – present)
- Chen Yudong (China) (2023 – present), three-time Chinese National champion (2023–2025)
- Aleksandr Fegan (United States) (2025 – present)
- Petr Gumennik (Russia) (2021 – present), 2023 Russian National silver medalist and 2024 Russian National bronze medalist
- Li Yu-Hsiang (Chinese Taipei) (2025 – present),
- Ilia Malinin (United States) (2021 – present), 2026 Olympic U.S Team Event Gold Medalist, three-time World Champion (2024–26), 2023 World bronze medalist, four-time U.S. National champion (2023–26), three-time Grand Prix Final champion (2023–25), 2022 Grand Prix Final bronze medalist, and 2022 Junior World champion
- Matthew Nielsen (United States) (2019 – present)
- Camden Pulkinen (United States) (May 2022 – present), 2-time U.S. National bronze medalist (2024–25)
- Georgii Reshtenko (Czech Republic) (2025 – present)
- Aleksandr Selevko (Estonia) (2024 – present)
- Mihhail Selevko (Estonia) (2024 – present)
- Hetty Shi (Canada) (2023 – present)
- Eric Sjoberg (United States) (2013 – present)
- Artur Smagulov (Kazakhstan) (2023 – present)
- Andrew Torgashev (United States) (2020 – present), 2023 U.S. National bronze medalist and 2025 U.S. National silver medalist
- Sofia Samodelkina (Kazakhstan) (2024 – present), 2025 Kazakh National champion, 2025 World University Games bronze medalist

His former students include:

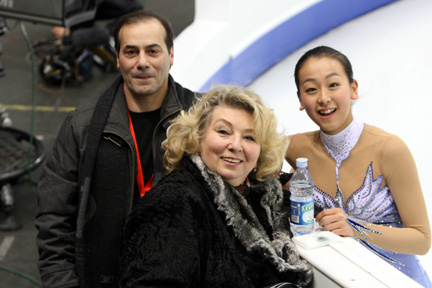
Arutyunyan with Tatiana Tarasova (center) and Mao Asada (right) at the 2007–08 Grand Prix Final

- Alexander Abt (Russia) (early 1990s – 2002) 2003 Russian National Champion, 2002 European silver medalist, 1998 European bronze medalist
- Mao Asada (summer 2006 – January 2008), coached to win 2007 World silver medal, 2006 Grand Prix Final title, and two Japanese National titles (2007–08)
- Mariah Bell (United States) (August 2016 – October 2022), 2022 U.S. National champion
- Michal Březina (Czech Republic) (June 2016 – March 2022)
- Jeffrey Buttle (Canada) (2004 – 2008), 2006 Olympic bronze medalist, 2008 World champion, and four-time Canadian National champion (2004–07)
- Nathan Chen (United States) (2011 – 2022), 2022 Men’s Singles Olympic Champion, 2022 Olympic U.S. Team gold medalist, 2018 Olympic U.S. Team bronze medalist, 3-time World champion (2018–19, 2021), 2017–2022 U.S. National champion, 3-time Grand Prix Final champion (2017–19), and 2017 Four Continents champion
- Mandy Chiang (Chinese Taipei) (2018 – 2020)
- Sasha Cohen (United States) (2009),
- Ivan Dinev (Bulgaria) (2002 – 2003),
- Stephen Gogolev (Canada) (June 2019 – 2024), 2019 Junior Grand Prix Final champion
- Marin Honda (Japan) (March 2018 – 2019),
- Taichi Honda (Japan) , (March 2018 – 2021)
- Alexa Knierim / Brandon Frazier (United States) (2020 – 2022), 2022 World champions and 2022 Grand Prix Final silver medalists
- Alexa Knierim / Chris Knierim (2019 – 2020),
- Kiira Korpi (Finland) (August 2013 – 2014),
- Michelle Kwan (United States) (2003 – 2006), coached to win 2004 World bronze medal and two U.S. National championship titles (2004–05)
- Hiu Ching Kwong (Hong Kong) (2019 – 2020),
- Alexandra Ievleva (Russia) (1996 – 2000) (2008 – 2010),
- Vivian Le (June 2016 – December 2017),
- Lim Eun-soo (South Korea) (April 2018 – September 2019),
- Amy Lin (Chinese Taipei) (2017 – 2018),
- Hannah Miller (United States) (June 2015 – August 2016),
- Hovhannes Mkrtchyan (Armenia) (unknown – 2011),
- Andrea Montesinos Cantú (Mexico) (2017 – 2023),
- Romain Ponsart (France) (August 2016 – March 2022),
- Adam Rippon (United States) (September 2012 – March 2018), 2016 U.S. national champion, 2018 Winter Olympics U.S. Team bronze medalist
- Audrey Shin (United States) (2016 – 2018),
- Alexander Shubin (Russia) (unknown – 2001),
- Sophie Joline von Felten (Switzerland) (2022 – 2023),
- Sergei Voronov (Russia) (unknown – 2000),
- Ashley Wagner (United States) (June 2013 – March 2018), 2016 World silver medalist, 2014 Winter Olympics U.S. Team bronze medalist, and three-time U.S. National champion
