= Wang Lei (figure skater) =

Chinese pair skater

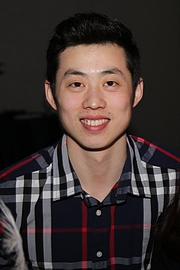
- Wang at the 2016 World Championships

Personal information
- Born: July 11, 1988 (age 38) Harbin, China
- Height: 1.84 m (6 ft 1/2 in)

Figure skating career
- Country: China
- Discipline: Pair skating (since 2007); Men's singles (2003–06)
- Partner: Peng Cheng (since 2023); Wang Xuehan (2012–20); Zhang Yue (2006–12)
- Coach: Ding Yang
- Skating club: New Century Club, Beijing
- Began skating: 1993
Event	Gold medal – first place	Silver medal – second place	Bronze medal – third place
Chinese Championships	2	3	4
Junior Grand Prix Final	0	1	1
Medal list
Chinese Championships
Gold medal – first place	2016 Harbin	Pairs
Gold medal – first place	2023 Chengde	Pairs
Silver medal – second place	2009 Beijing	Pairs
Silver medal – second place	2015 Changchun	Pairs
Silver medal – second place	2019 Harbin	Pairs
Bronze medal – third place	2010 Beijing	Pairs
Bronze medal – third place	2011 Qiqihar	Pairs
Bronze medal – third place	2013 Harbin	Pairs
Bronze medal – third place	2018 Changchun	Pairs
Junior Grand Prix Final
Silver medal – second place	2008–09 Goyang	Pairs
Bronze medal – third place	2009–10 Tokyo	Pairs

Wang Lei (born July 11, 1988) is a Chinese pair skater. With Wang Xuehan, he is a bronze medalist at three Grand Prix events – 2014 Trophée Éric Bompard, 2014 Cup of China, and 2016 NHK Trophy – and the 2016 Chinese national champion. With earlier partner Zhang Yue, he is a two-time ISU Junior Grand Prix Final medalist, having won silver in 2008 and bronze in 2009.

== Personal life ==
Wang Lei was born on July 11, 1988, in Harbin, Heilongjiang, China.

== Career ==
=== Single skating ===
Wang started skating in 1993 after a sports club visited his kindergarten in order to recruit new members. He made his international debut competing as a single skater on the junior level. He finished 7th at two ISU Junior Grand Prix events.

=== Partnership with Zhang ===
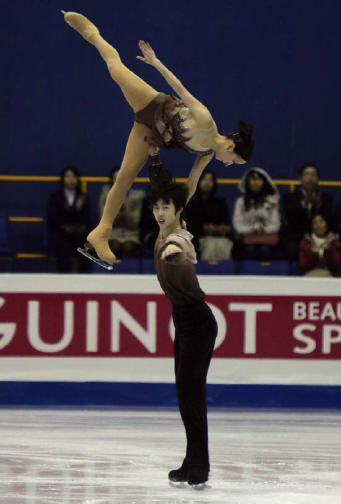
Zhang/Wang perform a lift at the 2008–09 Junior Grand Prix Final

Wang teamed up with Zhang Yue in 2006. In the 2007–08 season, the pair won two bronze medals on the Junior Grand Prix (JGP) circuit and qualified to their first JGP Final. They made their senior Grand Prix debut at the 2007 Cup of China before placing 8th at the JGP Final in Gdańsk, Poland. Following the retroactive disqualification of gold medalists Vera Bazarova / Yuri Larionov due to a positive doping sample from Larionov, Zhang/Wang moved up to 7th place. They concluded their season at the 2008 World Junior Championships in Sofia, Bulgaria. Ranked 4th in the short and 7th in the free, they finished 7th overall which, combined with Dong Huibo / Wu Yiming's bronze medal result, allowed China to send three pairs to the 2009 event.

In the 2008–09 JGP series, Zhang/Wang won a bronze medal in Belarus and finished 5th in Mexico. They were awarded the silver medal at the JGP Final in Goyang, South Korea. At the 2009 World Junior Championships in Sofia, the pair placed 7th in the short, 8th in the free, and 8th overall. At the 2009 World Championships in Los Angeles, they ranked 14th in the short, 16th in the free, and 16th overall.

Zhang/Wang won silver medals at their 2009–10 JGP assignments, in Belarus and Germany, and qualified to the JGP Final in Tokyo, where they took the bronze medal. They finished 6th at the 2010 Four Continents Championships in Jeonju.

The pair won the bronze medal at the 2011 Winter Universiade in Erzurum, Turkey. They placed 9th at the 2011 Four Continents in Taipei, 13th at the 2011 Worlds in Moscow, and 9th at the 2012 Four Continents in Colorado Springs, Colorado. Their partnership ended in 2012.

=== Partnership with Wang Xuehan ===
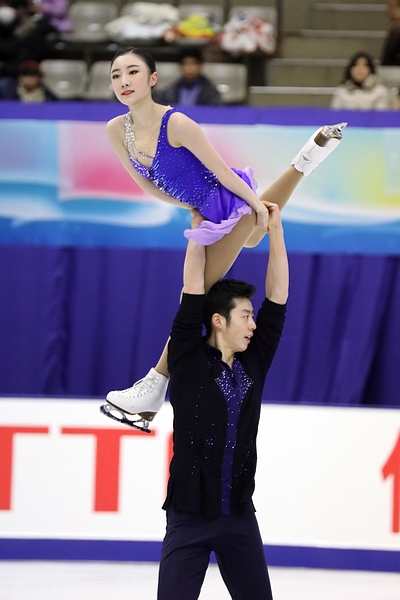
Wang/Wang at the 2016 NHK Trophy

Wang's partnership with Wang Xuehan began in 2012. The pair won the bronze medal at the 2013 Chinese Championships.

Making their Grand Prix debut, the Wangs placed fourth at the 2013 Cup of China. They finished fourth at the 2014 Chinese Championships.

The following season, the Wangs were awarded bronze at both of their Grand Prix events – 2014 Cup of China and 2014 Trophée Éric Bompard. They took the silver medal at the 2015 Chinese Championships.

In the 2015–16 season, the pair placed fifth at the 2015 Skate America and fourth at the 2015 Cup of China. They were selected to compete at their first ISU Championship – the 2016 Worlds in Boston. Ranked 15th in the short program and 14th in the free skate, they finished 15th overall.

They were fourth at the 2016 Cup of China and won the bronze medal at the 2016 NHK Trophy. Due to injury, they did not compete again until the 2018-19 Chinese National Games, where they placed second.

In September 2020, it was announced that Wang and Wang had split and that he was paired with Yu Xiaoyu, although they never competed together internationally.

=== Partnership with Peng ===
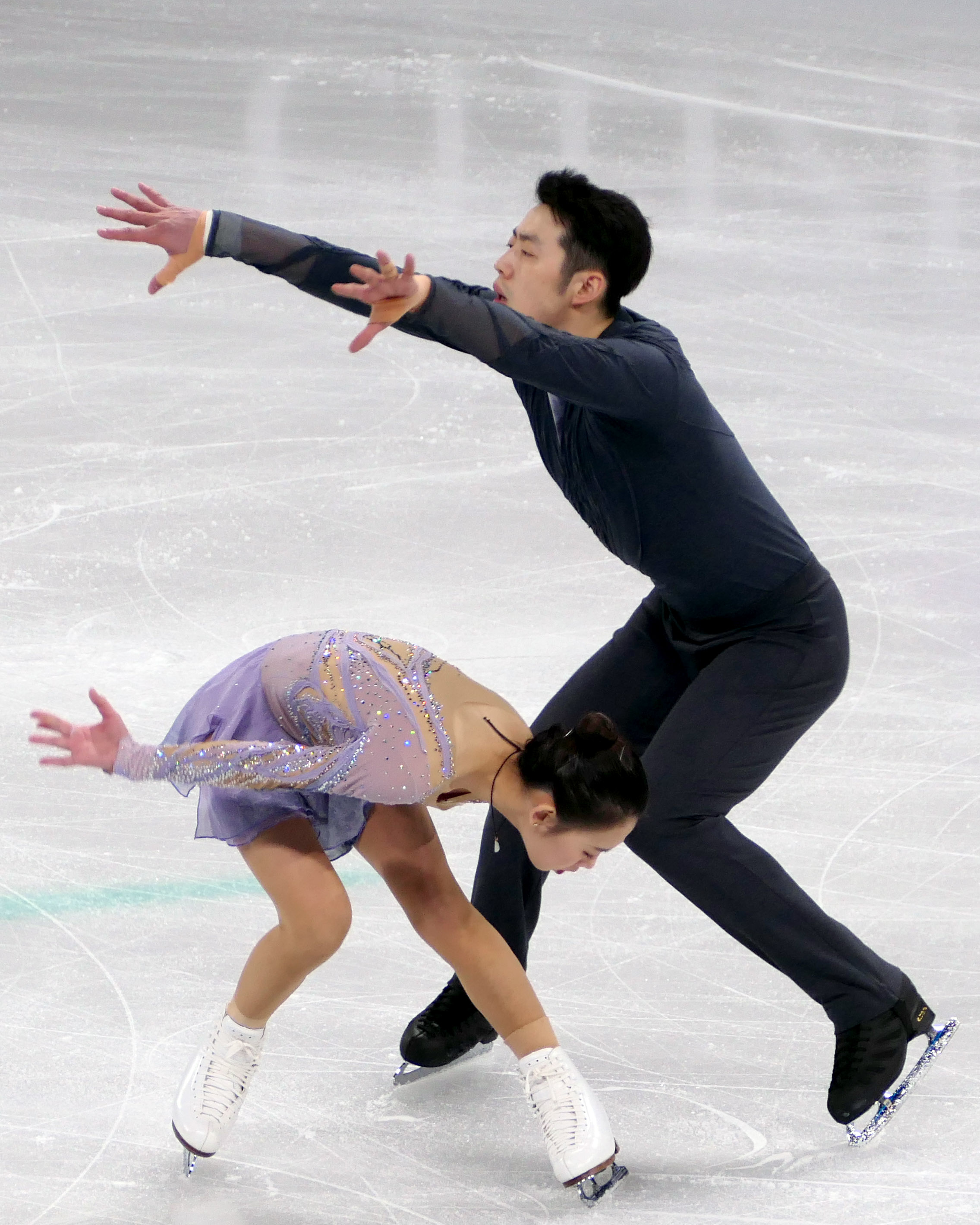
Peng and Wang performing their short program at the 2024 World Championships

Xiaoyu and Wang never competed together. In April, it was announced that Yu had retired. In June 2023, it was announced that he was paired with Peng Cheng.

Peng/Wang made their competitive debut with a gold medal win at the Shanghai Trophy. They were assigned to make their Grand Prix at the 2023 Cup of China, held this time in Chongqing. They finished third in both segments, winning the bronze medal. The following week they competed at the 2023 Grand Prix of Espoo, where they won the short program but dropped to fourth place after the free skate.

The team made their Four Continents Championships debut at the 2024 edition in Shanghai, coming sixth. Peng/Wang were sixteenth in their World Championship debut as a team. Christopher Tin, the composer of their short program music, would later praise the team for their interpretation to his music.

== Programs ==
=== With Peng ===
Season	Short program	Free skating	Exhibition
2023–2024	The Storm-Driven Sea by Christopher Tin choreo. by Lori Nichol	The Sorcerer's Apprentice by Paul Dukas performed by Stolen Music; The Sorcerer's Apprentice (from Fantasia 2000) by Paul Dukas performed by James Levine both arranged by C. Lenore Kay choreo. by Lori Nichol	With You by Zhou Shen; Brilliant Adventurer（璀璨冒险人） (from Doula Continent（斗羅大陸) by Zhou Shen

=== With Wang Xuehan ===
Season	Short program	Free skating	Exhibition
2016–17	Steppin' Out with My Baby performed by the Jumpin' Joz Band choreo. by David Wilson	Love Is A Many-Splendored Thing by Sammy Fain choreo. by David Wilson	Hurt performed by Wei Zhang
2015–16	Romance by Gavriel Lipkind & Alexandra Lubchansky choreo. by David Wilson	My Fair Lady by Frederick Loewe choreo. by David Wilson	The Prayer by Celine Dion, Andrea Bocelli
2014–15	Romance by Gavriel Lipkind & Alexandra Lubchansky choreo. by David Wilson	My Fair Lady by Frederick Loewe choreo. by David Wilson	Wishing You Were Somehow Here Again by Andrew Lloyd Webber
2013–14	The Swan by Camille Saint-Saëns choreo. by Helen Jiang	Singin' in the Rain by Nacio Herb Brown choreo. by Helen Jiang	Wishing You Were Somehow Here Again by Andrew Lloyd Webber

=== With Zhang Yue ===
Season	Short program	Free skating
2011–12	The Swan by Camille Saint-Saëns	Singin' in the Rain by Nacio Herb Brown
2010–11	Tango de los Exilados by Walter Taieb, Vanessa-Mae	Rhapsody on a Theme of Paganini by Sergei Rachmaninoff
2009–10	Rhapsody on a Theme of Paganini by Sergei Rachmaninoff	Coppélia by Léo Delibes
2008–09	The Way Old Friends Do by ABBA performed by Maksim Mrvica	Coppélia by Léo Delibes
2007–08	Sailor's Hornpipe; Anchor's Away; A Life on the Ocean Wave; Drunken Sailor	Coppélia by Léo Delibes

=== Single skating ===
Season	Short program	Free skating
2004–05	Exodus	Sarabande by George Frideric Handel

== Competitive highlights ==
- GP – Event of the ISU Grand Prix Series
- JGP – Event of the ISU Junior Grand Prix Series
- Medals at team events are awarded for the team results only. Individual placements at team events are listed in parentheses.

=== Pair skating with Peng Cheng ===
Competition placements at senior level
Season	2023–24	2024–25
World Championships	16th	
Four Continents Championships	6th	
Chinese Championships	1st	
GP Cup of China	3rd	WD
GP Finland	4th	
GP France		WD
Shanghai Trophy	1st	

=== Pair skating with Wang Xuehan ===
Competition placements at senior level
Season	2012–13	2013–14	2014–15	2015–16	2016–17	2017–18	2018–19
World Championships				15th			
Chinese Championships	3rd	4th	2nd	1st		3rd	2nd
GP Cup of China		4th	3rd	4th	4th		
GP NHK Trophy					3rd		
GP Skate America				5th			
GP Trophée Éric Bompard			3rd				
Chinese Winter Games				2nd			
Team Challenge Cup				3rd (4th)			

=== Pair skating with Zhang Yue ===
Competition placements at junior level
Season	2007–08	2008–09	2009–10
World Junior Championships	7th	8th	6th
Junior Grand Prix Final	8th	2nd	3rd
JGP Belarus		3rd	2nd
JGP Estonia	3rd		
JGP Germany			2nd
JGP Great Britain	3rd		
JGP Mexico		5th	

Competition placements at senior level
Season	2007–08	2008–09	2009–10	2010–11	2011–12
World Championships		16th		13th	
Four Continents Championships			6th	9th	9th
Chinese Championships	6th	2nd	3rd	3rd	
GP Cup of China	4th	5th			
GP NHK Trophy				8th	
GP Skate America		8th			
Winter Universiade				3rd	

=== Single skating ===
Competition placements at junior level
Season	2003–04	2004–05	2005–06
JGP China		7th	
JGP Czech Republic	17th		
JGP Japan			7th
JGP Slovenia	12th		

== Detailed results ==
- Small medals for the short program and free skating are only awarded at ISU Championships.
- Medals at team events are awarded for the team results only. Individual placements at team events are listed in parentheses.

=== Pair skating with Wang Lei ===
ISU personal best scores in the +5/-5 GOE System
Segment	Type	Score	Event
Total	TSS	186.16	2023 Grand Prix of Espoo
Short program	TSS	65.25	2023 Grand Prix of Espoo
Short program	TES	35.62	2023 Grand Prix of Espoo
Short program	PCS	29.63	2023 Grand Prix of Espoo
Free skating	TSS	120.91	2023 Grand Prix of Espoo
Free skating	TES	59.92	2024 Four Continents Championships
Free skating	PCS	63.52	2023 Grand Prix of Espoo

Results in the 2023–24 season
Date	Event	SP		FS		Total	
Date	Event	P	Score	P	Score	P	Score
Oct 3–5, 2023	(China) 2023 Shanghai Trophy	3	62.33	1	118.34	1	180.67
Nov 10–12, 2023	2023 Cup of China	3	62.91	3	115.15	3	178.06
Nov 17–19, 2023	(Finland) 2023 Grand Prix of Espoo	1	65.25	4	120.91	4	186.16
Dec 24–26, 2023	(China) 2023 Chinese Championships	1	66.66	1	118.64	1	185.30
Jan 30 – Feb 4, 2024	(China) 2024 Four Continents Championships	5	60.18	6	120.04	6	180.22
Mar 18–24, 2024	(Canada) 2024 World Championships	15	59.50	16	106.17	16	165.67

=== With Wang ===
2018–2019 season
Date	Event	SP	FS	Total
December 29–30, 2018	2019 Chinese Championships	3; 62.79	2; 124.02	2; 186.81
2016–2017 season
Date	Event	SP	FS	Total
November 18–20, 2016	2016 Cup of China	4; 66.45	4; 115.57	4; 182.02
November 25–27, 2016	2016 NHK Trophy	3; 65.66	3; 119.66	3; 185.32
2015–2016 season
Date	Event	SP	FS	Total
April 22–24, 2016	2016 Team Challenge Cup	–	4; 118.78	4P/3T; 118.78
March 28–April 3, 2016	2016 World Championships	15; 57.32	14; 111.33	15; 168.65
December 26–27, 2015	2016 Chinese Championships	1; 69.17	1; 117.28	1; 186.45
November 5–8, 2015	2015 Cup of China	4; 69.36	4; 117.40	4; 186.76
October 23–25, 2015	2015 Skate America	3; 64.95	6; 106.82	5; 171.77
2014–2015 season
Date	Event	SP	FS	Total
December 27–28, 2014	2015 Chinese Championships	2; 62.57	2; 123.15	2; 185.72
November 21–23, 2014	2014 Trophée Éric Bompard	3; 63.25	4; 118.72	3; 181.97
November 7–9, 2014	2014 Cup of China	2; 57.27	3; 114.88	3; 172.15
2013–2014 season
Date	Event	SP	FS	Total
December 28–29, 2013	2014 Chinese Championships	5; 55.21	4; 100.79	4; 156.00
November 1–3, 2013	2013 Cup of China	5; 57.16	4; 115.19	4; 172.35
2012–2013 season
Date	Event	SP	FS	Total
December 20–21, 2012	2013 Chinese Championships	4; 45.27	3; 94.15	3; 139.42
