= Diana Y. Chen =

Taiwanese figure skater

Personal information
- Born: June 17, 1984 (age 42)
- Height: 170 cm (5 ft 7 in)

Figure skating career
- Country: Taiwan
- Coach: Debbie Parcher, Brittney Bottoms, Dale Wright

Diana Y. Chen (born June 17, 1984 in Salt Lake City, Utah, United States) is an American figure skater who competed internationally for Taiwan. She is the 2003 Taiwanese national champion. Her highest placement at an ISU Championship was 33rd at the 2001 World Junior Figure Skating Championships.

== Results ==
Event	2000-2001	2001-2002	2002-2003
World Championships		39th	
World Junior Championships	33rd	37th	
Chinese Taipei Figure Skating Championships	4th	3rd	1st
