= Pearl River High School (New York) =

Location
- 275 East Central Avenue; Pearl River, New York 10965; United States
- Coordinates: 41.061103°N 74.009159°W

Information
- Other name: PRHS
- Type: Public high school
- Motto: Believe You Can Achieve
- School district: Pearl River School District
- NCES School ID: 362256003178
- Principal: Robert Zegarelli
- Teaching staff: 77.62 (on an FTE basis)
- Grades: 8–12
- Enrollment: 1,002 (2018-19)
- Student to teacher ratio: 12.91
- Colors: Blue and white
- Athletics conference: Section 1 (NYSPHSAA)
- Mascot: Pirate
- Newspaper: Pirates' Log
- Website: prhs.pearlriver.org

Pearl River High School (PRHS) is a public high school in Pearl River, Rockland County, New York, United States. It is part of the Pearl River Union Free School District. The building was used to film many of the school scenes in the 2020 Netflix movie The Half of It.

== Awards ==
- 2001 Malcolm Baldrige National Quality Award
- 2020 Niche.com COVID-19 pandemic Safety Award

== Notable alumni ==
- Harry Babcock, football player and first overall draft pick
- Kevin Houston, basketball player
- Dan Fortmann, football player
- Christopher Carley, actor
- Corinna Lin, figure skater
- Robert Clohessy, actor
- Paul Teutul Sr., motorcycle designer
