= Crystal Kiang =

Taiwanese-American figure skater

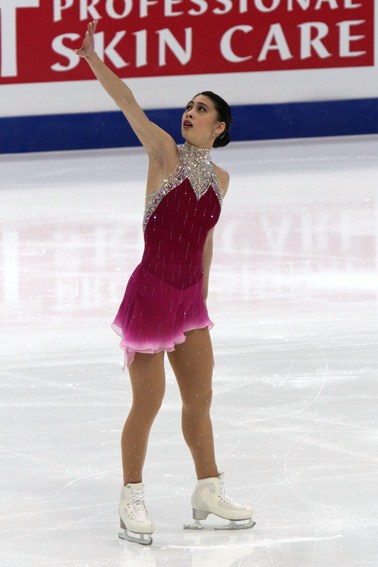

Personal information
- Born: April 12, 1990 (age 36) New York City, New York, U.S.
- Home town: New York City, New York, U.S.
- Height: 5 ft 5 in (1.65 m)

Figure skating career
- Country: Chinese Taipei (2008–2014); United States
- Coach: Hong-Yun Liu; Tracy Doyle-Lunde
- Skating club: SC of New York
- Retired: 2015?

Crystal Kiang (Chinese: 江玟玟; pinyin: Jiāng Wénwén, born April 12, 1990) is a Taiwanese-American former figure skater who competed internationally for Taiwan in ladies singles. She is a two-time (2010 and 2013) Taiwanese national champion and competed in the free skate at five Four Continents Championships, placing a career-best 15th in 2013.

== Personal life ==
Kiang was born on April 12, 1990, in New York City, New York. She is currently a skating coach located in New York, often teaching her students at the Andrew Stergiopoulos ice rink in Long Island. She is also a skating coach at Ice House located in Hackensack, New Jersey. Her other hobbies include ballet and music.

== Skating career ==
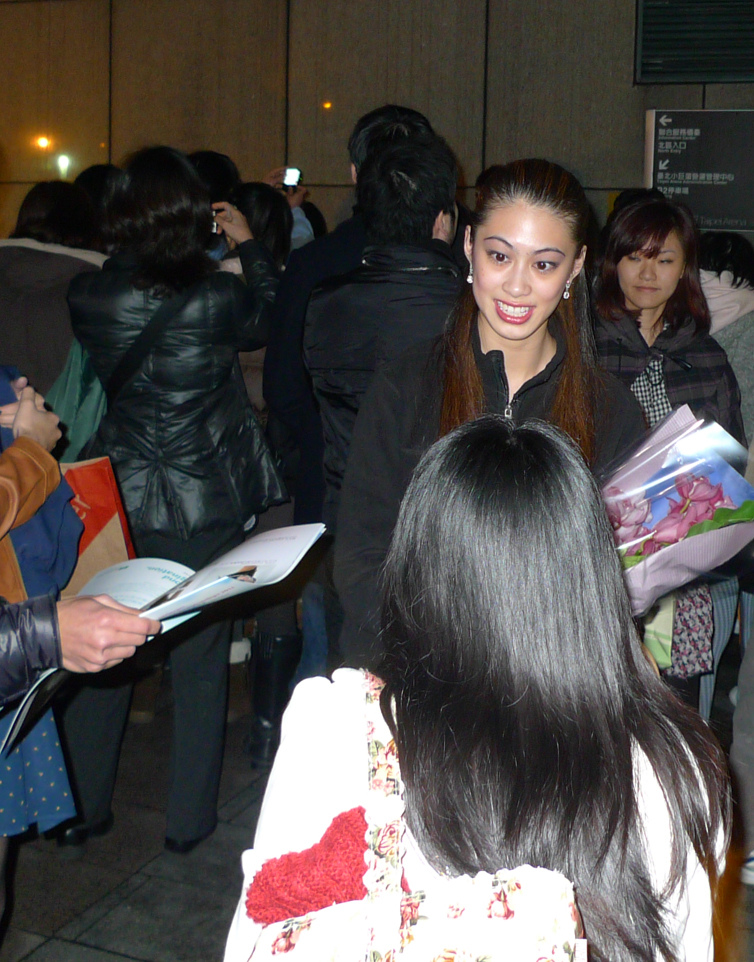
Kiang with fans at the 2011 Four Continents Championships in Taipei.

Kiang started skating at the age of five in 1995. She made her international debut at the 2008 Four Continents Figure Skating Championships in Goyang, South Korea, representing Taiwan.

During the 2008–2009 season, Kiang competed at her first Junior Grand Prix event in Madrid, Spain. Later that season, she competed at the 2009 Four Continents Figure Skating Championships in Vancouver, British Columbia, Canada.

During the 2009–2010 season, she competed at the Four Continents Figure Skating Championships in Jeonju, South Korea where she placed 18th. Later that season, she competed at the 2010 World Figure Skating Championships in Turin, Italy, which was her first World Championships competition.

During the 2010–2011 season, Kiang competed at the 2011 Four Continents Figure Skating Championships in Taipei, Taiwan.

During the 2011–2012 season, Kiang competed at two international competitions in Europe. They were the 2011 Finlandia Trophy in Vantaa, Finland and 2011 Merano Cup in Merano, Italy. She later competed at the 2012 Four Continents Figure Skating Championships in Colorado Springs, United States.

During the 2012–2013 season, Kiang competed at the 2012 Asian Figure Skating Trophy in Taipei, Taiwan where she finished 7th. She then competed at the 2012 U.S. International Figure Skating Classic in Salt Lake City, United States where she placed in the top ten.

== Programs ==
Season	Short program	Free skating
2013–2014	Leeloos Tune by Maksim Mrvica	Piano Concerto No. 2 by Sergei Rachmaninoff
2012–2013	Nostalgia by Yanni	Piano Concerto No. 2 by Sergei Rachmaninoff
2011–2012	Nostalgia by Yanni	Piano Concerto No. 2 by Sergei Rachmaninoff
2010–2011	Requiem for a Dream by Clint Mansell	Piano Concerto No. 2 by Sergei Rachmaninoff
2009–2010	Requiem for a Dream by Clint Mansell	Adagio in G Minor by Remo Giazotto, Tomaso Albinoni
2007–2009	Malaguena by Ernesto Lecuona	Sheherazade by Nikolai Rimsky-Korsakov

== Competitive highlights ==
International
Event	07–08	08–09	09–10	10–11	11–12	12–13	13–14
Worlds			43rd				
Four Continents	25th	25th	18th	21st	23rd	15th	20th
Asian Trophy						7th	
DS Cup						7th	
Finlandia Trophy					10th		
Merano Cup					21st		
Nebelhorn Trophy							20th
NRW Trophy						31st	
U.S. Classic						9th	8th
Volvo Cup						17th	
International: Junior
JPG Spain		31st					
National
Chinese Taipei	5th	5th	2nd	2nd	2nd	1st	
JGP = Junior Grand Prix
