= Corinna Lin =

Taiwanese-American figure skater

Personal information
- Born: October 26, 1994 (age 31)
- Home town: New York, New York, U.S.
- Height: 5 ft 4 in (1.63 m)

Figure skating career
- Country: Chinese Taipei; United States
- Coach: Debbie Milne-Davis
- Skating club: SC of New York

Corinna Lin (林俐君; born October 26, 1994) is a Taiwanese-American figure skater who competes internationally for Taiwan in ladies singles. She is the 2011 Taiwanese National Champion.

== Personal background ==
Lin attended Pearl River High School in Rockland, New York. Aside from skating, Lin is an honors student and a first degree taekwondo black belt. She speaks fluent Mandarin Chinese and hopes to become a doctor.

== Skating background ==
Lin won the gold medal at the 2011 Chinese Taipei Figure Skating Championships in Taipei, Taiwan at the age of 16. There were no other competitors in her division, and therefore Lin won by default.

=== Skate for Love ===
Lin, with the help of Madison Olivieri, created Skate for Love, a figure skating cause for cancer research. The proceeds went on to help the Susan G. Komen for the Cure charity.

== Competitive highlights ==
Event	2010–11	2011–12
Chinese Taipei Figure Skating Championships	1st	
Junior Grand Prix, Riga	30th	
Nestle Kangus Cup	12th	
Crystal Skate	21st	
