= Li Yu-hsiang =

Taiwanese figure skater (born 2006)

Li Yu-Hsiang
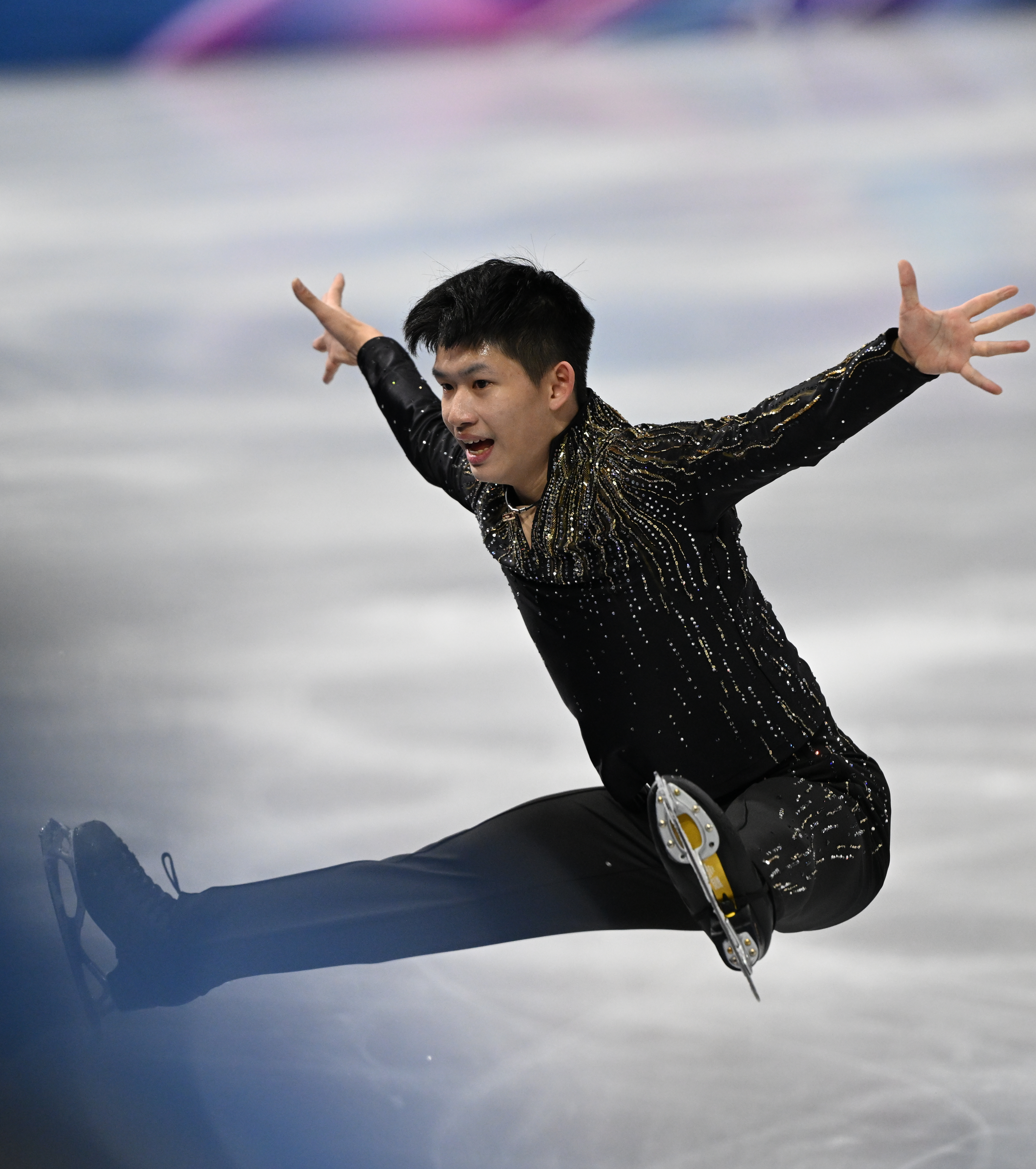
- Li Yu-hsiang at the 2026 Winter Olympics

Personal information
- Other names: Jordan Li
- Born: November 22, 2006 (age 20) Taipei, Taiwan
- Height: 1.70 m (5 ft 7 in)

Figure skating career
- Country: Chinese Taipei
- Discipline: Men's singles
- Coach: Ivan Dinev; Rafael Arutyunyan; Yuka Sato; Kim Soo-jin
- Began skating: 2014

Medal record
Chinese Taipei Championships
Gold medal – first place	2024-25 Taipei	Singles

Li Yu-Hsiang (Chinese: 李宇翔; born 22 November 2006) is a Taiwanese figure skater. He is the 2024 Chinese Taipei national champion and the 2025 Asian Open Trophy silver medalist.

He represented Chinese Taipei at the 2026 Winter Olympics, becoming the third Taiwanese figure skater to qualify for the Winter Olympics, after Pauline Lee and David Liu, and the first to be based in Taiwan.

== Personal life ==
Li Yu-Hsiang was born in Taipei, Taiwan. Li had poor health as a child and began trying various sports at the advice of his doctor. At the age of eight, Li began figure skating, enjoying the combination of art and technique.

At eight years old, Li moved in with his grandmother while his parents worked to financially support him. Since he began skating, Li's grandmother has supported in his training, accompanying him to practice every day.

In December 2025, Allianz Taiwan Life named Li as their Olympic and Paralympic Movements ambassador.

== Career ==
=== Early years ===
Li began learning how to skate in 2014. He first competed at the novice level, winning the Asian Open Trophy at the basic novice level in 2017, winning silver at the basic novice level in 2018, and silver at the advanced novice level in 2019.

As a junior starting in the 2021–22 season, Li competed on the Junior Grand Prix, placing as high as seventh. He qualified for two World Junior Championships, placing twenty-eighth in 2023 and sixteenth in 2024. Li won the Chinese Taipei Championships at the junior level four times, from 2020 to 2023.

=== 2023-24 season ===
Li first competed at the senior level at the 2024 Thailand Open Trophy, placing first with a score of 186.22, over 35 points above second place medalist Ze Zeng Fang.

=== 2024–25 season ===
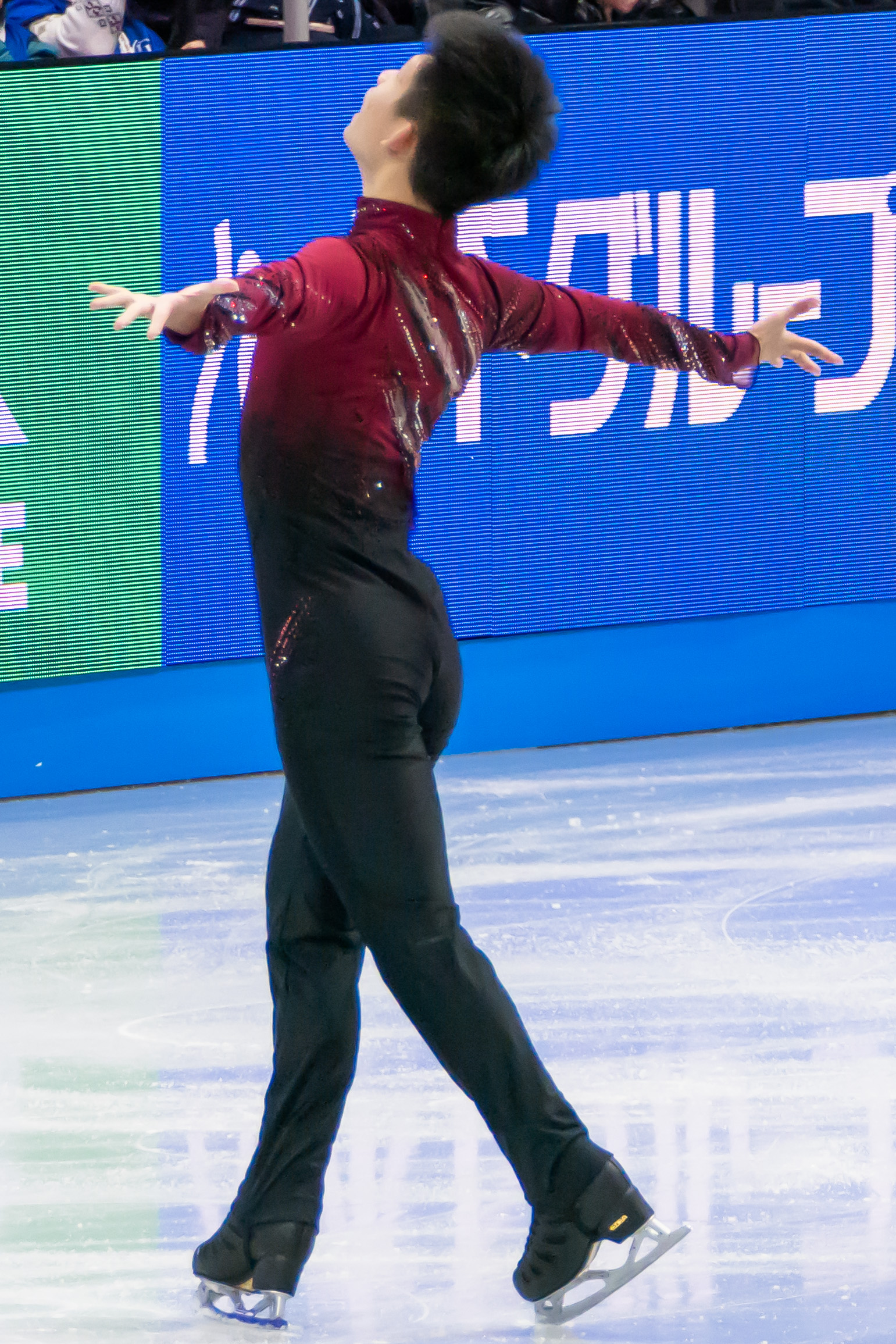
Li at the 2025 World Championships

Li elected to turn senior during the 2024–25 season, making his senior international debut at the 2024 Asian Open Trophy. Li placed seventh in the short program and sixth in the free skate, finishing eighth overall. Li next competed at his first ISU Challenger Series competition, finishing twentieth at the 2024 CS Nebelhorn Trophy. At the 2024 CS Trophée Métropole Nice Côte d'Azur, Li finished in ninth with a personal best score of 206.40, earning the minimum technical score required to compete at the 2025 World Championships.

At the 2024 Chinese Taipei Championships, Li won his first senior national championships. At the 2024 Santa Claus Cup, Li placed fourth in the short program and first in the free skate, winning the title overall. At the 2024 CS Golden Spin of Zagreb, Li finished tenth.

Li was the sole Taiwanese figure skating representative at the 2025 Asian Winter Games. Aiming for a top ten finish, Li finished eleventh in the short program and 8th in the free skate, ultimately placing eighth.

Li was once again the sole Taiwanese representative at the 2025 Four Continents Championships and 2025 World Championships. At Four Continents, Li finished seventeenth in the short program and tenth in the free skate, placing fourteenth overall. Li finished thirtieth at the 2025 World Championships, failing to qualify for the free skate.

=== 2025-26 season: Milano Cortina Olympics ===
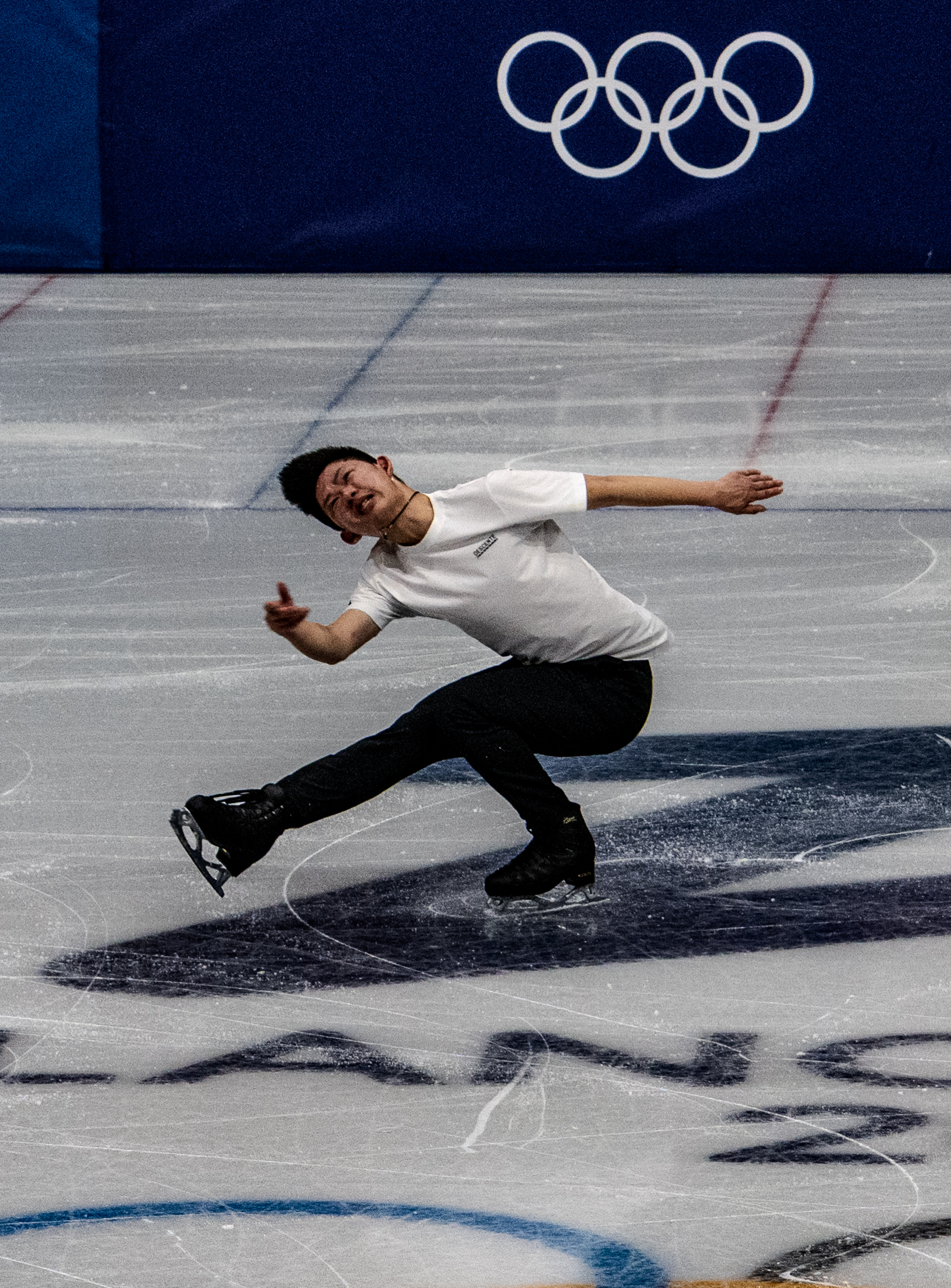
Yu-Hsiang during a practice session at the 2026 Winter Olympics

Li began the 2025–26 season BY competing at the 2025 Asian Open Trophy, placing second behind Kim Hyun-gyeom of South Korea. At the 2025 Skate to Milano, Li placed eighth in the short program, third in the free skate, and fifth overall, 0.86 points ahead of sixth place Davide Lewton Brain. With his placement, Li narrowly qualified for the 2026 Winter Olympics, becoming the third figure skater, along with Pauline Lee (1988) and David Liu (1988, 1992, 1998), representing Chinese Taipei to qualify for the Olympics.

In November, Li competed at the 2025 Santa Claus Cup, winning the gold medal. Two months later, he took the silver medal at the 2026 Sofia Trophy. In January, Li finished eighteenth at the 2026 Four Continents Championships in Beijing, China.

Li was subsequently selected as Chinese Taipei's flag bearer for the Olympic opening ceremony.

On 10 February, Li competed in the short program segment at the 2026 Winter Olympics, placing twenty-fourth and advancing to the free skate segment. Two days later, he placed twenty-first in the free skate and finished in twenty-third place overall.

A few weeks later, Li competed at the 2026 World Junior Championships placing 13th overall.

In March, Li competed at the 2026 World Championships. He placed thirty-second in the short program and did not advance to the free skate.

== Programs ==
Season	Short program	Free skate	Ref.
2021–22	La La Land; Another Day of Sun by Justin Hurwitz, choreo. by Yuka Sato	La terre vue du ciel by Armand Amar, choreo. by Yuka Sato	
2022–23	AJR Carma by AJR, choreo. by Yuka Sato, Jeremy Abbott, Tseng Yu-Hsun	Eleanor Rigby from The Beatles & Cody Fry, choreo. by Yuka Sato, Jeremy Abbott, Tseng Yu-Hsun	
2023–24	AJR Carma by AJR, choreo. by Yuka Sato, Jeremy Abbott, Tseng Yu-Hsun	Eleanor Rigby from The Beatles & Cody Fry, choreo. by Yuka Sato, Jeremy Abbott, Tseng Yu-Hsun	
2024–25	This is War by Matthew Raetzel & Richard Farrell, choreo. by Shin Yea-ji	Eleanor Rigby from The Beatles & Cody Fry, choreo. by Yuka Sato, Jeremy Abbott, Tseng Yu-Hsun	
2025–26	This is War by Matthew Raetzel & Richard Farrell, choreo. by Shin Yea-ji	Eleanor Rigby from The Beatles & Cody Fry, choreo. by Yuka Sato, Jeremy Abbott, Tseng Yu-Hsun	

== Competitive highlights ==
- JGP – Event of the ISU Junior Grand Prix Series
- CS – Event of the ISU Challenger Series
- TBD – Assigned
- WD – Withdrew from competition

Competition placements at senior level
Season	2023–24	2024–25	2025–26	2026–27
Winter Olympics			23rd	
World Championships		30th	32nd	
Four Continents Championships		14th	18th	
Chinese Taipei Championships		1st		
CS Trophée Métropole Nice		9th		
CS Golden Spin of Zagreb		10th		
CS Nebelhorn Trophy		20th		
CS Tallinn Trophy				6th
Asian Games		8th		
Santa Claus Cup		1st	1st	
Skate to Milano			5th	
Sofia Trophy			2nd	
Thailand Open Trophy	1st	1st		
Asian Open		8th	2nd	3rd
Denkova-Staviski Cup				TBD

Competition placements at junior level
Season	2020–21	2021–22	2022–23	2023–24	2024–25	2025-26
World Junior Championships			28th	16th		13th
Chinese Taipei Championships	1st	1st	1st	1st		
JGP Austria		11th				
JGP Japan				9th		
JGP Latvia			13th			
JGP Poland		7th				
JGP Thailand				10th		
Asian Open			2nd	1st		
Cranberry Cup			5th			
Denver Cup					1st	
Kings Cup				1st		
Sofia Trophy		2nd				
Volvo Open Cup				2nd		

== Detailed results ==
ISU personal best scores in the +5/-5 GOE System
Segment	Type	Score	Event
Total	TSS	216.98	2025 Skate to Milano
Short program	TSS	72.41	2026 Winter Olympics
Short program	TES	39.84	2026 Winter Olympics
Short program	PCS	33.65	2025 Skate to Milano
Free skating	TSS	146.67	2025 Skate to Milano
Free skating	TES	77.25	2026 Winter Olympics
Free skating	PCS	70.63	2025 Skate to Milano

=== Senior level ===
Results in the 2023–24 season
Date	Event	SP		FS		Total	
Date	Event	P	Score	P	Score	P	Score
May 3–6, 2024	2024 Thailand Open Trophy	1	58.78	1	127.44	1	186.22

Results in the 2024–25 season
Date	Event	SP		FS		Total	
Date	Event	P	Score	P	Score	P	Score
Sep 2–6,2024	(Hong Kong) 2024 Asian Open Trophy	7	69.03	6	126.01	8	195.04
Sep 19–21, 2024	(Germany) 2024 CS Nebelhorn Trophy	19	57.87	19	111.49	20	169.36
Oct 16–20, 2024	(France) 2024 CS Trophée Métropole Nice Côte d'Azur	12	66.17	8	140.23	9	206.40
Oct 23–24, 2024	2024 Chinese Taipei Championships	1	53.00	1	138.20	1	191.20
Nov 27 – Dec 2, 2025	(Hungary) 2024 Santa Claus Cup	4	66.01	1	141.52	1	207.53
Dec 4–7, 2024	(Croatia) 2024 CS Golden Spin of Zagreb	12	64.11	6	134.25	10	198.36
Feb 11–13, 2025	(China) 2025 Asian Winter Games	11	57.38	8	129.88	8	187.26
Feb 19–23, 2025	(South Korea) 2025 Four Continents Championships	17	61.87	10	142.42	14	204.29
Mar 25–30, 2025	(United States) 2025 World Championships	30	69.63	—N/a	—N/a	30	60.93
May 1–4, 2025	2025 Thailand Open Trophy	1	62.35	1	126.10	1	188.45

Results in the 2025–26 season
Date	Event	SP		FS		Total	
Date	Event	P	Score	P	Score	P	Score
Aug 1–5, 2025	(Philippines) 2025 Asian Open Trophy	4	59.38	2	134.96	2	194.34
Sep 18–21, 2025	(China) 2025 Skate to Milano	8	70.31	3	146.67	5	216.98
Nov 26–30, 2025	(Hungary) 2025 Santa Claus Cup	2	61.20	2	121.16	1	182.36
Jan 6–11, 2026	(Bulgaria) 2026 Sofia Trophy	2	71.32	2	125.97	2	197.29
Jan 21–25, 2026	(China) 2026 Four Continents Championships	20	63.33	17	134.94	18	198.27
Feb 10–13, 2026	(Italy) 2026 Winter Olympics	24	72.41	21	141.92	23	214.33
Mar 24–29, 2026	(Czech Republic) 2026 World Championships	32	64.74	—N/a	—N/a	32	64.74

Results in the 2026–27 season
Date	Event	SP		FS		Total	
Date	Event	P	Score	P	Score	P	Score
Aug 1-5, 2026	(Indonesia) 2026 Asian Open Trophy	2	72.95	4	123.72	3	196.67
Nov 16–22, 2026	(Estonia) 2026 CS Tallinn Trophy	5	72.07	9	125.31	6	197.38

=== Junior level ===
Results in the 2021–22 season
Date	Event	SP		FS		Total	
Date	Event	P	Score	P	Score	P	Score
Sep 29 – Oct 2, 2021	2021 JGP Poland	11	60.90	6	125.30	7	186.20
Oct 6–9, 2021	2021 JGP Austria	12	60.58	11	113.51	11	174.09
Feb 1–6, 2022	(Bulgaria) 2022 Sofia Trophy	2	61.53	1	126.07	2	187.60

Results in the 2022–23 season
Date	Event	SP		FS		Total	
Date	Event	P	Score	P	Score	P	Score
Aug 10–14, 2022	(United States) 2022 Cranberry Cup International	6	53.57	4	105.62	5	159.19
Sep 7–10, 2022	2022 JGP Latvia	15	51.71	12	113.00	13	164.71
Sep 7–9, 2022	(Indonesia) 2022 Asian Open Trophy	2	54.16	2	117.71	2	171.87
Feb 27 – Mar 5, 2023	(Canada) 2023 World Junior Championships	28	56.67	—N/a	—N/a	28	56.67

Results in the 2023–24 season
Date	Event	SP		FS		Total	
Date	Event	P	Score	P	Score	P	Score
Aug 16–19, 2022	(Thailand) 2022 Asian Open Trophy	2	61.90	1	127.03	1	188.93
Aug 23–26, 2023	2023 JGP Thailand	6	65.79	12	106.87	10	172.66
Sep 13–16, 2023	2023 JGP Japan	6	66.36	8	118.86	9	185.22
Oct 5–7, 2023	(United States) 2023 Kings Cup International	1	66.94	1	124.17	1	191.11
Nov 11-12, 2023	2023 Chinese Taipei Championships	1	68.85	1	122.98	1	191.83
Jan 18–21, 2024	(Latvia) 2024 Volvo Open Cup	4	62.75	2	123.05	2	185.60
Feb 26 – Mar 3, 2024	(Taiwan) 2024 World Junior Championships	13	66.53	14	126.73	16	193.26

Results in the 2024–25 season
Date	Event	SP		FS		Total	
Date	Event	P	Score	P	Score	P	Score
Mar 6–8, 2025	(United States) 2025 Denver International Cup	1	64.62	1	125.00	1	189.62

Results in the 2025–26 season
Date	Event	SP		FS		Total	
Date	Event	P	Score	P	Score	P	Score
3 Mar - 8 Mar, 2026	(Estonia) 2026 World Junior Championships	12	71.06	16	131.48	13	202.54
