= Stephen Li-Chung Kuo =

Taiwanese-American figure skater

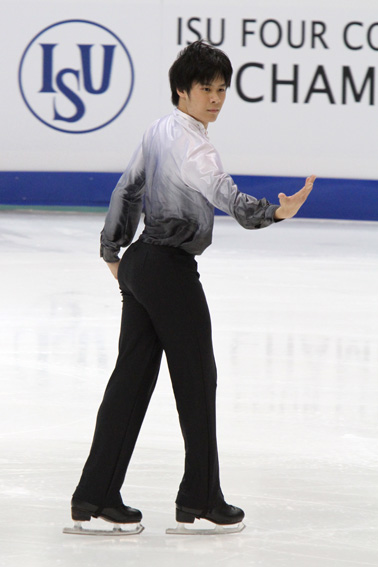
- Kuo at the 2011 Four Continents Championships in Taipei

Personal information
- Full name: Stephen Li-Chung Kuo
- Other names: Stephen Kuo
- Born: July 27, 1990 (age 35) Trenton, New Jersey
- Home town: Piscataway, New Jersey
- Height: 1.75 m (5 ft 9 in)

Figure skating career
- Country: Chinese Taipei
- Coach: Roland Burghart

Stephen Li-Chung Kuo (Chinese: 郭立中; pinyin: Guō Lìzhōng) (born July 27, 1990) is a Taiwanese-American figure skater who represented Taiwan in men's singles. He is a two-time Taiwanese national champion (2010–2011) and competed in the free skate at three ISU Championships.

== Personal life ==
Kuo was born on July 27, 1990, in Trenton, New Jersey. His hobbies include juggling with a specialty in Diabolo, playing violin, and reading.

== Skating career ==
Kuo was coached by Roland Burghart in Monmouth Junction, New Jersey, and represented Taiwan. He made his international debut at the 2009 World Junior Championships in Sofia, Bulgaria; he placed 27th in the short program and did not advance further. His first senior international was the 2009 Nebelhorn Trophy in Oberstdorf, Germany.

Kuo won two senior national titles and competed in the final segment at three ISU Championships — 2010 Four Continents in Jeonju, South Korea; 2010 Junior Worlds in The Hague, Netherlands; and 2011 Four Continents in Taipei, Taiwan. He also competed at two World Championships but did not reach the free skate.

Kuo was a member of the founding executive board for Rutgers University Figure Skating Club, has additionally passed both Gold USFS Free Skate and Gold USFS Moves in the Field tests and now coaches figure skating domestically.

=== Competitive highlights ===
International
Event	2008–09	2009–10	2010–11	2011–12
World Champ.		37th	19th P	
Four Continents Champ.		16th	20th	
Nebelhorn Trophy		24th		
International: Junior
World Junior Champ.	27th	22nd		
JGP Croatia			8th	
JGP United States			11th	
National
Chinese Taipei Champ.	3rd	1st	1st	3rd
JGP = Junior Grand Prix; P = Preliminary round

=== Programs ===
Season	Short program	Free skating
2010–2011	A Los Amigos	Piano Concerto No.2 by Sergei Rachmaninoff
2008–2009	Violin and Piano Concerto by Johannes Brahms	Christopher Columbus: The Discovery by Cliff Eidelman
