= Andy Chen =

Taiwanese figure skater

Personal information
- Born: July 12, 1986 (age 39) Tainan, Taiwan
- Height: 179 cm (5 ft 10 in)

Figure skating career
- Country: Chinese Taipei
- Coach: Anthony Liu, Igor Pashkevich

Andy Chen (Hsuan-Yu Chen) (born July 12, 1986) is a Taiwanese figure skater. He is the 2005 Taiwan national champion. Chen is a three time competitor on the Junior Grand Prix circuit and a one time competitor at the World Junior Figure Skating Championships. Chen is coached by Anthony Liu and Igor Pashkevich. He currently attends California State University, San Bernardino.
