= Amy Lin =

Taiwanese-American figure skater

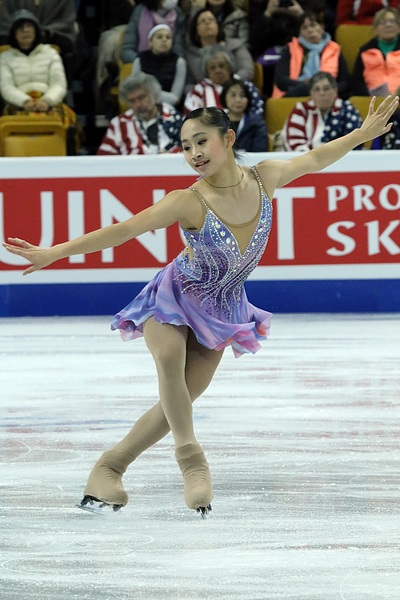
- Lin at the 2016 World Championships

Personal information
- Born: November 3, 1999 (age 26) Fremont, California, U.S.
- Height: 5 ft 1 in (1.55 m)

Figure skating career
- Country: Chinese Taipei (2015–2020); United States (until 2015)
- Coach: Namhoon Ryu
- Began skating: 2004
- Retired: 2020

Amy Lin (born November 3, 1999) is a Taiwanese-American figure skater. She is the 2016 Toruń Cup bronze medalist, the 2016 Asian Open bronze medalist, and a four-time Taiwanese national champion (2016–2019). She has competed in the final segment at eight ISU Championships.

== Personal life ==
Lin was born on November 3, 2000, in Fremont, California. She has one older brother, James, who is a student at UC Berkeley. She trained in gymnastics, ballet, and Chinese dance while also skating before moving to Riverside, California.

== Career ==
=== Early years ===
Lin began skating at age four-and-a-half when her mother brought her children to a local ice rink. She represented the United States at one international event, the 2014 International Challenge Cup, finishing 7th on the junior level.

=== For Taiwan (Chinese Taipei) ===
Lin began appearing internationally for Chinese Taipei (Taiwan) in the 2015–16 season. Making her senior international debut, she placed fourth at the Asian Open Trophy in August 2015. In September, she competed at her first ISU Junior Grand Prix (JGP) event, placing 10th in Colorado Springs, Colorado. Later that month, she finished 8th at her first ISU Challenger Series (CS) event, the 2015 U.S. International Classic. She was 7th at the 2015 CS Golden Spin of Zagreb.

In January 2016, Lin won the senior bronze medal at the Toruń Cup in Poland. In February, she competed at the 2016 Four Continents Championships in Taipei, placing 17th in the short program, 12th in the free skate, and 15th overall. In March, she finished 14th at the 2016 World Junior Championships in Debrecen, Hungary, having placed 22nd in the short and 11th in the free. She qualified for the final segment at the 2016 World Championships in Boston by placing 14th in the short program. Ranked 22nd in the free, she finished 21st overall.

Lin started off the 2016–17 season with a bronze medal at the Asian Open Trophy in August 2016. She placed eighth in the short program at JGP Japan before withdrawing due to injury. Post-competition examinations revealed a bone bruise in her left ankle. Consequently, she withdrew from all her fall events. Lin resumed full-time training in January 2017, after dealing with a succession of injuries that included an ankle sprain and shin splints.

== Skating technique ==
Unlike most skaters, Lin jumps and spins clockwise.

== Programs ==
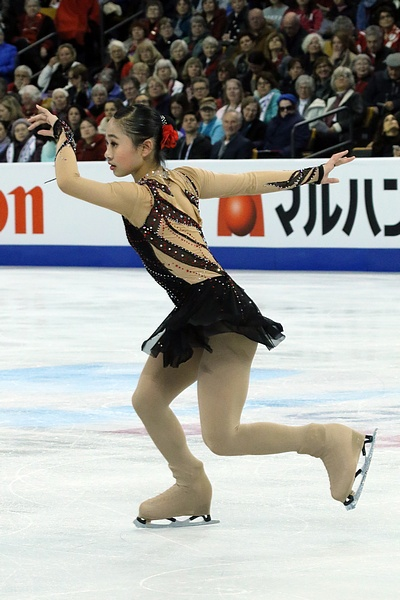
Lin in 2016

Season	Short program	Free skating	Exhibition
2018–19	Now We Are Free (from Gladiator) by Hans Zimmer; Run Boy Run by Woodkid	Overture - The Heat Is On in Saigon; I'd Give My Life For You (from Miss Saigon) by Alain Boublil, Claude-Michel Schönberg	
2017–2018	Snake Women (from Iris (Cirque du Soleil)) Danny Elfman	Juliet's Aria (Sono andati) (from Heavenly Creatures soundtrack) by Giacomo Puccini performed by Kate Winslet; Musetta's Waltz (from La bohème) by Giacomo Puccini	Sorry Not Sorry by Demi Lovato
2016–2017	Skyliner (from "I'll Be Seeing You: A Tribute to Carmen McRae") by Charlie Barnet, Robert Allen	August's Rhapsody (from August Rush) by Mark Mancina	Maybe I Love You by Lenka
2015–2016	Slumdog Millionaire by A. R. Rahman; Latika's Theme; Jai Ho	Yo Soy Maria (from María de Buenos Aires) by Astor Piazzolla	Xiao Xing Yun (from Our Times) by Hebe Tien
2013–2014	Vortex by Robert Longfield	Carmen Suite by Rodion Shchedrin, Georges Bizet	
2012–2013	Kung Fu Panda 2 by Hans Zimmer	Spirited Away by Joe Hisaishi	

== Competitive highlights ==
CS: Challenger Series; JGP: Junior Grand Prix

=== For Taiwan ===
International
Event	15–16	16–17	17–18	18–19	19–20
Worlds	21st	28th	28th		
Four Continents	15th	17th	18th	19th	20th
CS Asian Open				7th	
CS Golden Spin	7th				
CS Nebelhorn			10th	11th	
CS Tallinn Trophy			9th	13th	
CS U.S. Classic	8th				
CS Warsaw Cup			18th		
Asian Games		9th			
Asian Open	4th	3rd	6th		
Denis Ten Memorial					7th
Halloween Cup				7th	
Int. Challenge Cup				WD	
Tallinn Trophy					11th
Toruń Cup	3rd			15th	
International: Junior
Junior Worlds	14th	21st	31st		
JGP Australia			15th		
JGP Japan		WD			
JGP U.S.	10th				
NRW Trophy	5th				
National
Taiwanese Champ.	1st	1st	1st	1st	
J = Junior level TBD = Assigned, WD = Withdrew

=== For the United States ===
International
Event	09–10	10–11	11–12	12–13	13–14	14–15
Int. Challenge Cup					7th J	
National
U.S. Championships				2nd N	6th J	5th J
U.S. Junior Champ.		16th I				
Pacific Coast Sect.			7th N	1st N	1st J	1st J
Southwest Pacific Reg.						1st J
Central Pacific Reg.	4th V	3rd I	2nd N	1st N	1st J	
Levels: V = Juvenile; I = Intermediate, N = Novice; J = Junior
