= Zhu Qiuying =

Chinese former competitive figure skater (born 1994)

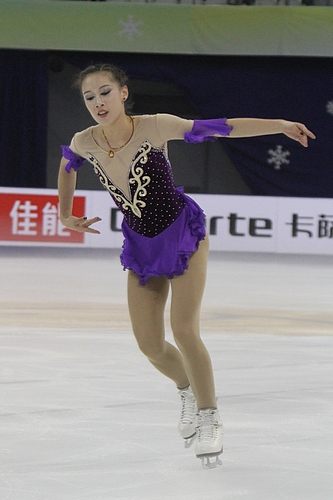
- Zhu at the 2011 Cup of China

Personal information
- Born: October 3, 1994 (age 31) Harbin, Heilongjiang, China
- Height: 1.61 m (5 ft 3 1/2 in)

Figure skating career
- Country: China
- Coach: Fu Caishu
- Skating club: Ice Training Center Club of Heilongjiang
- Began skating: 2000

Zhu Qiuying (simplified Chinese: 朱秋颖; traditional Chinese: 朱秋穎; pinyin: Zhū Qiūyǐng; born October 3, 1994) is a Chinese former competitive figure skater. She qualified to the free skate at two Four Continents Championships and one World Junior Championship.

== Programs ==
Season	Short program	Free skating	Exhibition
2010–2012	The Nutcracker by Pyotr I. Tchaikovsky	Scent of a Woman by Thomas Newman	Cats by Andrew Lloyd Webber
2009–2010	Bohemian Rhapsody by Queen	Romeo and Juliet	

== Competitive highlights ==
GP: Grand Prix; JGP: Junior Grand Prix

International
Event	2008–09	2009–10	2010–11	2011–12
Four Continents			14th	16th
GP Cup of China			WD	10th
Asian Trophy				4th
International: Junior
Junior Worlds		19th		
JGP Hungary		8th		
JGP Turkey		4th		
National
Chinese Champ.	3rd	3rd		8th
Chinese NG				12th
WD = Withdrew
