= Jordan Ju =

Chinese Taipei figure skater (born 1995)

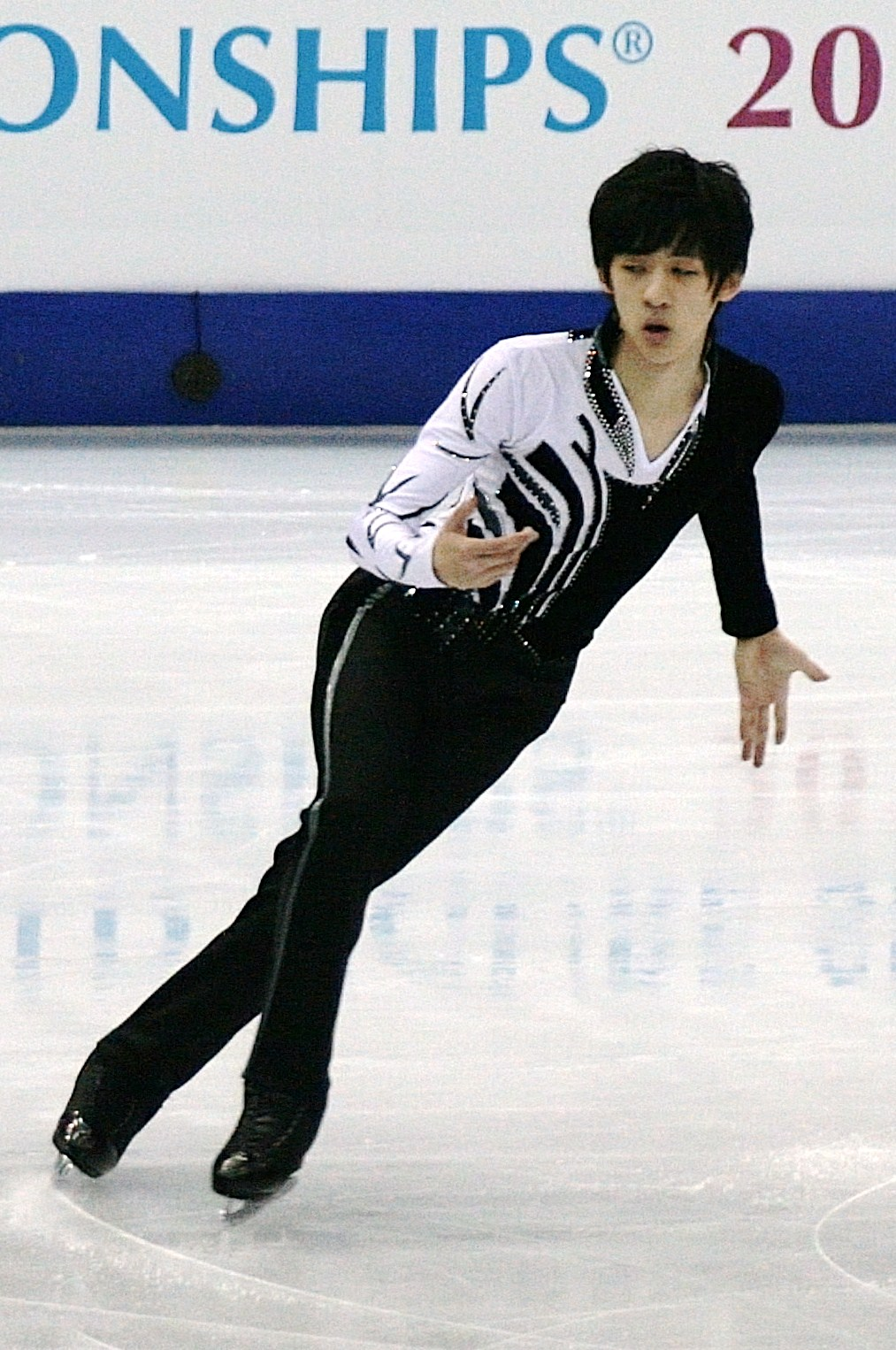
- Jordan Ju in 2012.

Personal information
- Born: May 29, 1995 (age 31) Vancouver, British Columbia, Canada
- Home town: Maple Ridge, British Columbia
- Height: 1.80 m (5 ft 11 in)

Figure skating career
- Country: Chinese Taipei
- Coach: Zdeněk Pazdírek
- Skating club: Coquiltam SC
- Began skating: 2000

Jordan Ju (born May 29, 1995) is a Chinese Taipei figure skater. He is a two-time national champion. As of 2026, he is now in a retired status, coaching in BC, Canada.

== Programs ==
Season	Short program	Free skating
2013–2014	Goodbye Pork Pie Hat by Jeff Beck	I Got Rhythm Variations; Porgy and Bess Medley by George Gershwin
2012–2013	Perry Mason Theme by Earle Hagen	Malaguena Blast (soundtrack); Malaguena performed by Gypsy Kings; Malaguena by Forever Cello
2011–2012	Perry Mason Theme by Earle Hagen	Lord of the Cello by Macston and Brydern; Store and Steel by H. Priccll; Black Violin
2010–2011	Magic Bird of Fire (Firebird by Igor Stravinsky modern arrangement)	Lord of the Cello by Macston and Brydern; Store and Steel by H. Priccll; Black Violin

== Competitive highlights ==
International
Event	2010–11	2011–12	2012–13	2013–14
Worlds		38th		
Four Continents	17th	21st	22nd	22nd
Golden Spin		11th		
Merano Cup		12th		
Nebelhorn				27th
Universiade				23rd
International: Junior
Junior Worlds	28th			
JGP Austria			15th	
JGP Czech Rep.	13th			12th
JGP Romania	13th			
JGP Slovenia			13th	
Asian Trophy			3rd J.	
National
Chinese Taipei	2nd	1st	1st	
J. = Junior level; JGP = Junior Grand Prix
