= Guan Xueting =

Chinese ice dancer

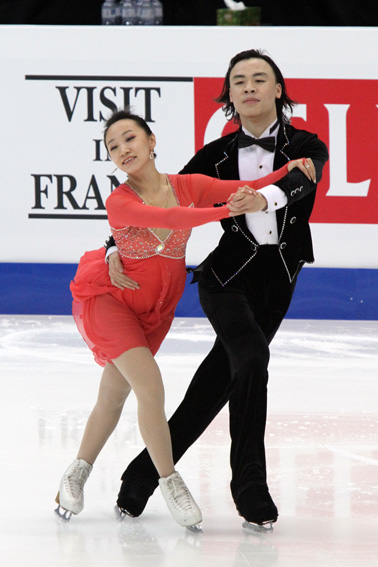

Personal information
- Full name: Guan Xueting
- Born: December 4, 1992 (age 33) Shenyang, Liaoning
- Height: 1.58 m (5 ft 2 in)

Figure skating career
- Country: China
- Partner: Wang Meng
- Skating club: Shenyang FSC

Guan Xueting (simplified Chinese: 关雪婷; traditional Chinese: 關雪婷; pinyin: Guān Xuětíng; born December 4, 1992, in Shenyang, Liaoning) is a Chinese ice dancer.

== Career ==
She began training in figure skating at the age of eight, and studied at Shenyang Sport University. With partner Wang Meng, she is the 2008 Chinese silver medalist. They placed 19th at the 2008 World Junior Championships. Guan and Wang continued to compete and came in fourth place in the 2008-09 season and third place in the 2009-10 season. The duo also participated in the Four Continents Figure Skating Championships and finished ninth and eighth respectively in the 2009-10 and 2010-11 seasons. After retiring from competitive skating, she worked as a figure skating coach for junior championships.

== Personal life ==
Guan was abducted in June 2011 but was later released and returned home. At the time, it was speculated that this was a prank. She later gave birth to a child during the years she was working as a skating coach.

== Competitive highlights ==
(with Wang)

Event	2006-07	2007-08	2008-09	2009-10	2010-11	2011-12
Four Continents Championships				9th	8th	
World Junior Championships		19th	14th			
Chinese Championships	5th	2nd	4th	3rd	4th	4th
Cup of China					9th	
Winter Universiade					11th	
Junior Grand Prix, Germany				10th		
Junior Grand Prix, Belarus				8th		
Junior Grand Prix, France			12th			
