= Chaochih Liu =

Taiwanese-American figure skater

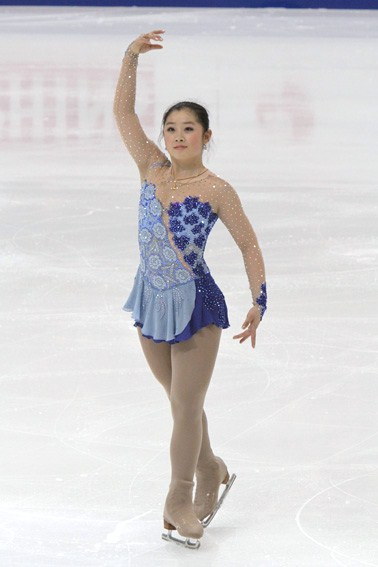
- Liu at the 2011 Four Continents Championships in Taipei

Personal information
- Born: February 10, 1993 (age 33) Springfield, Massachusetts, U.S.
- Home town: Minneapolis, Minnesota, U.S.
- Height: 5 ft 2 in (1.57 m)

Figure skating career
- Country: Chinese Taipei (2008–2012); United States
- Coach: Ann Edison

Chaochih Liu (born February 10, 1993; simplified Chinese: 刘兆芝; traditional Chinese: 劉兆芝; pinyin: Liú Zhàozhī) is a Taiwanese-American figure skater who competed internationally for Taiwan in ladies singles. She is the 2009 Taiwanese national champion and qualified to the free skate at three ISU Championships.

== Personal life ==
Liu was born on February 10, 1993, in the United States. She is currently a student at the University of Minnesota and coaches aspiring figure skaters in the United States. Liu enjoys playing the piano and guitar in her free time. She also works in a plant genetics research lab under the Department of Agronomy and Plant Genetics. She went to Cheyenne Mountain High School and speaks fluent Mandarin Chinese. Her grandfather was in the restaurant business in Zhongli, Taiwan before moving the family to Iowa City, Iowa. Her mother was a math professor at the University of Iowa before relocating to Colorado Springs, Colorado for better training. Liu has two younger sisters, Chelsea, who represented the United States and China in pairs, and Cheyenne.

== Skating career ==
Liu started skating at the age of seven. She competed on the national level in the United States where she placed 11th at the 2007 U.S. Championships on the junior level.

In 2008 Liu began representing Taiwan. She made her debut on the international scene at the 2008 Junior Grand Prix Mexico City competition. Liu made her senior debut at the 2009 Four Continents Championships in Vancouver, British Columbia, Canada where she finished 19th. Later that season, she competed at the 2009 World Championships in Los Angeles where she finished 28th.

== Competitive highlights ==
International
Event	07–08	08–09	09–10	10–11	11–12
World Championships		28th			
Four Continents Champ.		19th	30th	24th	26th
Asian Winter Games				12th	
Nebelhorn Trophy			17th		
Golden Spin		13th			
International: Junior
World Junior Champ.		17th			
JGP Mexico City		15th			
JGP Cape Town		14th			
JGP Lake Placid			19th		
JGP Dresden			28th		
JGP Karuizawa				19th	
JGP Brisbane					18th
National
Chinese Taipei Champ.		1st	3rd	3rd	3rd

== Programs ==
Season	Short program	Free skating
2011–2012	East of Eden (TV miniseries) by Lee Holdridge	Return with Honor; Sweet Remembrance of You by William Joseph
2010–2011	Accent from the Circle	The Four Seasons by Antonio Vivaldi
2008–2010	Temple of Life by Keiko Matsui	Midsummer Night's Dream by Felix Mendelssohn
