= Wun-Chang Shih =

Taiwanese figure skater

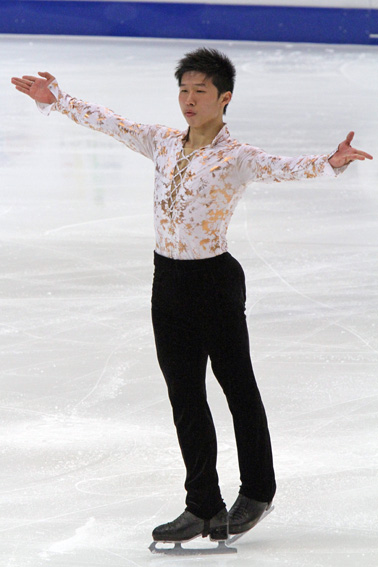
- Shih at the 2011 Four Continents Championships in Taipei

Personal information
- Full name: Wun-Chang Shih
- Born: October 3, 1986 (age 39) Taipei, Taiwan
- Home town: Taipei, Taiwan
- Height: 1.63 m (5 ft 4 in)

Figure skating career
- Country: Chinese Taipei
- Coach: Nobuo Sato

Wun-Chang Shih (Chinese: 施文倡; pinyin: Shī Wénchàng) (born October 3, 1986) is a Taiwanese figure skater who competes internationally for Taiwan in men's singles. He is a two-time Taiwanese national medalist and competed four times at the Four Continents Championships.

== Personal life ==
Shih was born on October 3, 1986, in Taipei, Taiwan. He is currently a student and trains with coach Nobuo Sato. His hobbies include basketball and badminton.

== Skating career ==
Shih made his international debut at the 2009 Four Continents Figure Skating Championships, in Vancouver, Canada. He was a member of the Chinese Taipei team at the 2009 Winter Universiade in Harbin, China and the 2011 Asian Winter Games in Astana, Kazakhstan.

=== Competitive highlights ===
Results
International
Event	2008–09	2009–10	2010–11	2011–12
Four Continents Championships	24th	20th	19th	27th
Winter Universiade	32nd			
Asian Winter Games			10th	
Asian Trophy				7th
National
Chinese Taipei Championships			2nd	3rd

=== Programs ===
Season	Short program	Free skating
2011–2012	Night Flight from La cumparsita	The Rock by Nick Glennie-Smith, Hans Zimmer
2010–2011	Autumn by Ayako Nakane	Triangle by Hiroyuki Sawano
2009–2010	Triangle by Hiroyuki Sawano	Casino Royale by David Arnold
2008–2009	Secret by Jay Chou	Casino Royale by David Arnold
