= Melinda Wang =

Chinese figure skater (born 1990)

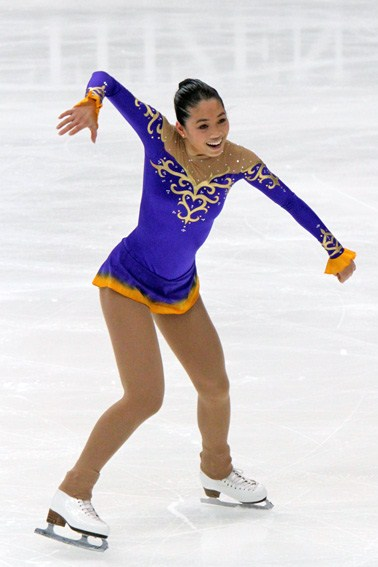
- Wang at the 2011 Four Continents Championships in Taipei

Personal information
- Born: December 18, 1990 (age 35) New York City, New York, U.S.
- Home town: Naperville, Illinois, U.S.
- Height: 5 ft 5 in (1.65 m)
- Spouse: Ryan Beckstead

Figure skating career
- Country: Chinese Taipei (2008–2013); United States (until 2008)
- Coach: Alexander Ouriashev
- Skating club: DuPage FSC
- Began skating: 1994

Melinda Wang (born December 18, 1990; Chinese: 王展玲; pinyin: Wáng Zhǎnlíng) is a Taiwanese-American figure skater who competed internationally for Taiwan in ladies' singles. She is a two-time (2008, 2011) Taiwanese national champion. She competed in the free skate at the 2008 World Championships and five Four Continents Championships.

== Personal life ==
Wang was born on December 18, 1990, in New York City, New York. She is currently a student and trains in Newark, Delaware. She enjoys dancing, baking, reading, and photography as her hobbies.

== Skating career ==
Wang started skating at the age of four. She competed in ice dancing in the United States, in partnership with Nathan Lim and Paul Wood.

In 2008 Wang began representing Taiwan in ladies' singles. She made her international debut at the 2008 Four Continents, where she finished 15th. Later that season, she competed at the 2008 World Championships in Gothenburg, Sweden; she qualified to the free skate and went on to finish 23rd.

Wang qualified to the free skate at four additional Four Continents Championships – in 2010, 2011, 2012, and 2013.

== Programs ==
Season	Short program	Free skating
2012–2013	Claudine by Maksim Mrvica	Sarabande performed by Escala; Sarabande performed by Maksim Mrvica
2011–2012	Otoñal by Raúl Di Blasio	Tosca by Giacomo Puccini
2010–2011	Otoñal by Raúl Di Blasio	Windmills of Your Mind by Michel Legrand
2008–2009	Otoñal by Raúl Di Blasio	El Piano de America by Raúl Di Blasio
2007–2008	Otoñal by Raúl Di Blasio	Tosca by Giacomo Puccini

== Competitive highlights ==
International
Event	07–08	08–09	09–10	10–11	11–12	12–13
World Championships	23rd					
Four Continents Champ.	15th	26th	19th	18th	14th	19th
Asian Trophy						4th
U.S. Classic						6th
International: Junior
World Junior Champ.			33rd			
JGP Hungary		14th				
National
Chinese Taipei Champ.	1st	3rd	2nd	1st	2nd	2nd
JGP = Junior Grand Prix; P = Preliminary round
