= Abzal Rakimgaliev =

Kazakhstani figure skater

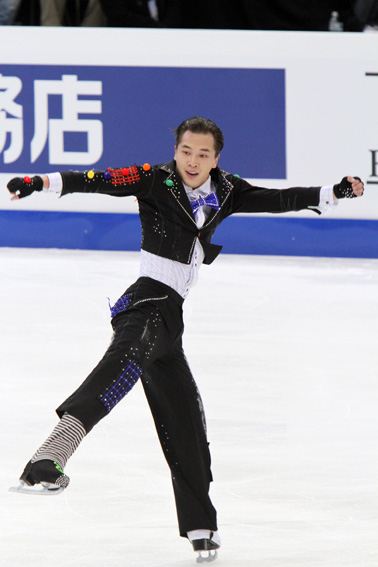
- Rakimgaliev in 2011.

Personal information
- Full name: Kazakh: Абзал Бауыржанұлы Рақымғалиев: Abzal Bawırjanulı Raqımğaliev
- Born: 25 May 1992 (age 34) Almaty, Kazakhstan
- Height: 1.68 m (5 ft 6 in)

Figure skating career
- Country: Kazakhstan
- Coach: Craig Maurizi, Nikolai Morozov
- Skating club: National Skating Federation of Kazakhstan
- Began skating: 1999
Medal record
Representing Kazakhstan
Figure skating: Men's singles
Asian Figure Skating Trophy
Silver medal – second place	2008 Asian Trophy	Hong Kong

Abzal Rakimgaliev (born 25 May 1992) is a Kazakhstani figure skater. He is the 2007 Kazakhstani national champion and has won seven senior international medals. He competed at the 2010 Olympics in Vancouver, where he placed 26th, and at the 2014 Olympics in Sochi, where he placed 22nd.

== Programs ==
Season	Short program	Free skating
2016–2017	Who Wants to Live Forever by Queen	Je dors sur des roses (from Mozart, l'opéra rock)
2015–2016	Too Darn Hot by Ella Fitzgerald	Je dors sur des roses (from Mozart, l'opéra rock)
2014–2015	He Lives in You (from The Lion King (musical)) by Mark Mancina, Jay Rifkin, Lebo M	Once Upon a Time in America by Ennio Morricone
2013–2014	Swing medley by Big Bad Voodoo Daddy	Once Upon a Time in America by Ennio Morricone
2012–2013	The Sting by Marvin Hamlisch	The Addams Family by Marc Shaiman
2011–2012	Tarzan by Mark Mancina	The Addams Family by Marc Shaiman
2010–2011	Beetlejuice by Danny Elfman	Circus
2009–2010	Selections by Maksim Mrvica	Irish dance
2008–2009	Carmina Burana by Carl Orff (modern arrangement)	Child in Paradise; Nostradamus by Maksim Mrvica
2007–2008	Furia by Brian May	Selections by Maksim Mrvica
2006–2007	Furia by Brian May	Selections by ABBA

== Competitive highlights ==
CS: Challenger Series; JGP: Junior Grand Prix

International
Event	04–05	05–06	06–07	07–08	08–09	09–10	10–11	11–12	12–13	13–14	14–15	15–16	16–17	17–18
Olympics						26th				22nd				
Worlds				24th		21st			28th	20th				32nd
Four Continents				13th	14th	13th	13th	18th	15th	15th	20th			23rd
CS DS Cup												6th		
CS Golden Spin												17th		
CS Tallinn Trophy													7th	
CS Warsaw Cup												11th	12th	13th
Universiade									12th		16th		12th	
Asian Games							7th						12th	
Asian Trophy					2nd									6th
Crystal Skate								6th		2nd				
Cup of Nice								11th						
Finlandia Trophy								12th						
Gardena								5th						4th
Golden Spin				10th		10th	5th							
Ice Star								6th						
Istanbul Cup								4th						
Lombardia Trophy										3rd				
Nepela Trophy								7th						
NRW Trophy							9th							
Printemps							4th							
Santa Claus Cup														5th
Triglav Trophy					3rd		3rd	1st	2nd					
International: Junior
Junior Worlds							11th							
JGP Japan							3rd							
JGP Germany							8th							
JGP Austria				15th										
JGP Belarus						15th								
JGP Bulgaria				9th										
JGP Hungary			13th											
JGP Italy					7th									
JGP Norway			12th											
JGP Spain					12th									
JGP Turkey						14th								
Gardena			7th J											
Golden Lynx				1st J										
Triglav Trophy			2nd J											
National
Kazakhstani	5th	2nd	1st			2nd		2nd	2nd	2nd	2nd	2nd		
