= List of figure skaters (women's singles) =

The following is a list of notable figure skaters who have competed in women's singles. These are skaters who have won a gold, silver, or bronze medal at at least one of the following competitions: the Winter Olympics, the World Figure Skating Championships, the European Figure Skating Championships, the Four Continents Figure Skating Championships, the Grand Prix of Figure Skating Final, the Winter Youth Olympics, the World Junior Figure Skating Championships, or the Junior Grand Prix Final; or who have won a gold medal at their national championships.

Skater	Nation	Major championships	Ref.
Polina Agafonova	Russia	(bronze) World Junior Championships (2010)	
Tenley Albright	United States	(gold) Winter Olympics (1956); World Championships (1953, 1955); U.S. Championships (1952–56)	
Tenley Albright	United States	(silver) Winter Olympics (1952); World Championships (1954, 1956)	
Zsuzsa Almássy	Hungary	(gold) Hungarian Championships (1964, 1966–70, 1972)	
Zsuzsa Almássy	Hungary	(silver) European Championships (1971)	
Zsuzsa Almássy	Hungary	(bronze) World Championships (1969); European Championships (1967, 1970)	
Jeannette Altwegg	Great Britain	(gold) Winter Olympics (1952); World Championships (1951); European Championships (1951–52); British Championships (1948–51)	
Jeannette Altwegg	Great Britain	(silver) World Championships (1950); European Championships (1950)	
Jeannette Altwegg	Great Britain	(bronze) Winter Olympics (1948); World Championships (1949); European Championships (1949)	
Miki Ando	Japan	(gold) World Championships (2007, 2011); Four Continents Championships (2011); Japan Championships (2004–05, 2011); World Junior Championships (2004); Junior Grand Prix Final (2001, 2003)	
Miki Ando	Japan	(silver) Grand Prix Final (2009); World Junior Championships (2003)	
Miki Ando	Japan	(bronze) World Championships (2009); Four Continents Championships (2008); World Junior Championships (2002); Junior Grand Prix Final (2002)	
Marta Andrade	Spain	(gold) Spanish Figure Skating Championships (1994–2003)	
Angela Anderes	Switzerland	(gold) Swiss Championships (1935–37, 1939–40)	
Shizuka Arakawa	Japan	(gold) Winter Olympics (2006); World Championships (2004); Japan Championships (1998–99)	
Shizuka Arakawa	Japan	(silver) Four Continents Championships (2002–03); Grand Prix Final (2004)	
Shizuka Arakawa	Japan	(bronze) Grand Prix Final (2003)	
Jenna Arrowsmith	Great Britain	(gold) British Championships (1995, 1997-98)	
An Xiangyi	China	(gold) Chinese Championships (2020, 2023)	
Tatiana Andreeva	Soviet Union	(gold) World Junior Championships (1985)	
Anna Antonova	Soviet Union	(bronze) World Junior Championships (1981)	
Mao Asada	Japan	(gold) World Championships (2008, 2010, 2014); Four Continents Championships (2008, 2010, 2013); Grand Prix Final (2005, 2008, 2012–13); Japan Championships (2007–10, 2012–13); World Junior Championships (2005); Junior Grand Prix Final (2004)	
Mao Asada	Japan	(silver) Winter Olympics (2010); World Championships (2007); Four Continents Championships (2011–12); Grand Prix Final (2006–07); World Junior Championships (2006)	
Mao Asada	Japan	(bronze) World Championships (2013); Four Continents Championships (2009)	
Birce Atabey	Turkey	(gold) Turkish Championships (2011–12, 2015–17)	
Zuzana Babiaková	Slovakia	(gold) Slovak Championships (1995–99, 2001–04)	
Martha Bachem	Germany	(gold) German Championships (1942-44)	
Martha Bachem	Austria	(gold) Austrian Championships (1942-43)	
Renata Baierová	Czechoslovakia	(gold) Czechoslovak Championships (1978-81)	
Oksana Baiul	Ukraine	(gold) Winter Olympics (1994); World Championships (1993); Ukrainian Championships (1993–94)	
Oksana Baiul	Ukraine	(silver) European Championships (1993–94)	
Maria Balaba	Latvia	(gold) Latvian Championships (2004–05)	
Sonja Balun	Austria	(gold) Austrian Championships (1973-76)	
Radka Bártová	Slovakia	(gold) Slovak Championships (2007)	
Erica Batchelor	Great Britain	(gold) British Championships (1957)	
Erica Batchelor	Great Britain	(silver) European Championships (1954)	
Erica Batchelor	Great Britain	(bronze) World Championships (1954); European Championships (1953, 1955–56)	
Nina Bates	Bosnia and Herzegovina	(gold) Bosnian Championships (2005)	
Emily Bausback	Canada	(gold) Canadian Championships (2020)	
Virginia Baxter	United States	(bronze) World Championships (1952)	
Susanne Becher	West Germany	(silver) World Junior Championships (1985–87)	
Jacqueline Belenyesiová	Slovakia	(gold) Slovak Championships (2005–06, 2008)	
Mariah Bell	United States	(gold) U.S. Championships (2022)	
Annie Bellemare	Canada	(bronze) Four Continents Championships (2000)	
Kateřina Beránková	Czech Republic	(gold) Czech Championships (1995)	
Rosemary Beresford	United States	(gold) U.S. Championships (1918)	
Becky Bereswill	United States	(gold) Junior Grand Prix Final (2008)	
Anna Bernauer	Luxembourg	(gold) Luxembourg Championships (2003–04)	
Ľudmila Bezáková	Czechoslovakia	(gold) Czechoslovak Championships (1970-71)	
Denise Biellmann	Switzerland	(gold) World Championships (1981); European Championships (1981); Swiss Championships (1979–81)	
Denise Biellmann	Switzerland	(bronze) European Championships (1979)	
Doris Blanc	Switzerland	(gold) Swiss Championships (1943)	
Nicole Bobek	United States	(gold) U.S. Championships (1995)	
Nicole Bobek	United States	(bronze) World Championships (1995)	
Nadège Bobillier	France	(gold) French Championships (2005–06)	
Surya Bonaly	France	(gold) European Championships (1991–95); French Championships (1998–97); World Junior Championships (1991)	
Surya Bonaly	France	(silver) World Championships (1993–95); European Championships (1996); World Junior Championships (1990)	
Surya Bonaly	France	(bronze) World Junior Championships (1989)	
Christel Borghi	Switzerland	(gold) Swiss Championships (1999)	
Cindy Bortz	United States	(gold) World Junior Championships (1987)	
Klara Bramfeldt	Sweden	(gold) Swedish Championships (1999–2001)	
Karin Brandstätter	Austria	(gold) Austrian Championships (2005)	
Suzie Brasher	United States	(gold) World Junior Championships (1976)	
Eliška Březinová	Czech Republic	(gold) Czech Championships (2012, 2014–16, 2018–22)	
Kimena Brog-Meier	Switzerland	(gold) Swiss Championships (2002)	
Tracy Brook	Australia	(gold) Australian Championships (1987-89)	
Eveline Brunner	Switzerland	(gold) Swiss Championships (2015)	
Melitta Brunner	Austria	(bronze) World Championships (1929)	
Aimee Buchanan	Israel	(gold) Israeli Championships (2017-18)	
Romy Bühler	Switzerland	(gold) Swiss Championships (2012)	
Svetlana Bukareva	Russia	(bronze) Junior Grand Prix Final (1999)	
Melissa Bulanhagui	Philippines	(gold) Philippine Championships (2012–13)	
Fritzi Burger	Austria	(gold) European Championships (1930); Austrian Championships (1928–31)	
Fritzi Burger	Austria	(silver) Winter Olympics (1928, 1932); World Championships (1929, 1932); European Championships (1931–32)	
Fritzi Burger	Austria	(bronze) World Championships (1928, 1931); European Championships (1933)	
Petra Burka	Canada	(gold) World Championships (1965); Canadian Championships (1964–66)	
Petra Burka	Canada	(bronze) Winter Olympics (1964); World Championships (1964, 1966)	
Sharon Burley	Australia	(gold) Australian Championships (1973-76)	
Gundi Busch	West Germany	(gold) World Championships (1954); European Championships (1954); German Championships (1953–54)	
Gundi Busch	West Germany	(silver) World Championships (1953); European Championships (1953)	
Maria Butyrskaya	Russia	(gold) World Championships (1999); European Championships (1998–99, 2002); Russian Championships (1993, 1995–99)	
Maria Butyrskaya	Russia	(silver) European Championships (2000–01); Grand Prix Final (1998)	
Maria Butyrskaya	Russia	(bronze) World Championships (1998, 2000); European Championships (1996); Grand Prix Final (1997, 1999)	
Jenna-Anne Buys	South Africa	(gold) South African Championships (2004, 2006–07)	
Ivana Buzková	Czech Republic	(gold) Czech Championships (2006–07)	
Dorothy Caley	Canada	(gold) Canadian Championships (1937)	
Anne-Sophie Calvez	France	(gold) French Championships (2007)	
Ana Cecilia Cantú	Mexico	(gold) Mexican Championships (2003, 2008–10)	
Michele Cantú	Mexico	(gold) Mexican Championships (2004, 2006–07)	
Linda Carbonetto	Canada	(gold) Canadian Championships (1969)	
Sandra Cariboni	Switzerland	(gold) Swiss Championships (1983)	
Joanne Carter	Australia	(gold) Australian Championships (1995–99, 2007–08)	
Alaine Chartrand	Canada	(gold) Canadian Championships (2016, 2019)	
Diana Y. Chen	Chinese Taipei	(gold) Chinese Taipei Championships (2003)	
Diane Chen	Chinese Taipei	(gold) Chinese Taipei Championships (2004–05)	
Karen Chen	United States	(gold) Winter Olympics (2022); U.S. Championships (2017)	
Chen Lu	China	(gold) World Championships (1995); Chinese Championships (1990–98, 2001)	
Chen Lu	China	(silver) World Championships (1996)	
Chen Lu	China	(bronze) Winter Olympics (1994, 1998); World Championships (1992–93); World Junior Championships (1991–92)	
Aliaksandra Chepeleva	Belarus	(gold) Belarusian Championships (2018-19)	
Jeanne Chevalier	Canada	(gold) Canadian Championships (1920-21)	
Mone Chiba	Japan	(gold) Four Continents Championships (2024)	
Mone Chiba	Japan	(bronze) Four Continents Championships (2023); World Championships (2025)	
Tiffany Chin	United States	(gold) U.S. Championships (1985); World Junior Championships (1981)	
Tiffany Chin	United States	(bronze) World Championships (1985–86)	
Mimi Tanasorn Chindasook	Thailand	(gold) Thai Championships (2009–11, 2013)	
Cho Hae-lyeum	South Korea	(gold) South Korean Championships (2002)	
Josée Chouinard	Canada	(gold) Canadian Championships (1991, 1993–94)	
Josée Chouinard	Canada	(bronze) Grand Prix Final (1995)	
Željka Čižmešija	Yugoslavia	(gold) Yugoslav Championships (1983, 1985-88, 1990-91)	
Sasha Cohen	United States	(gold) Grand Prix Final (2002); U.S. Championships (2006)	
Sasha Cohen	United States	(silver) Winter Olympics (2006); World Championships (2004–05); Grand Prix Final (2003)	
Sasha Cohen	United States	(bronze) World Championships (2006)	
Cecilia Colledge	Great Britain	(gold) World Championships (1937); European Championships (1937–39); British Championships (1935–39, 1946)	
Cecilia Colledge	Great Britain	(silver) Winter Olympics (1936); World Championships (1935, 1938); European Championships (1933, 1936)	
Cecilia Colledge	Great Britain	(bronze) European Championships (1935)	
Joanne Conway	Great Britain	(gold) British Championships (1986-69, 1991-92)	
Amber Corwin	United States	(silver) Four Continents Championships (1999); Junior Grand Prix Final (1997)	
Amber Corwin	United States	(bronze) Four Continents Championships (2004)	
Buse Coskun	Turkey	(gold) Turkish Championships (2002–03, 2006–07, 2009)	
Deborah Cottrill	Great Britain	(gold) British Championships (1979, 1982)	
Kailani Craine	Australia	(gold) Australian Championships (2015-20)	
Liliane Crosa	Switzerland	(gold) Swiss Championships (1959–60)	
Margaret Crosland	Canada	(gold) Canadian Championships (1958-59)	
Ting Cui	United States	(bronze) World Junior Championships (2019)	
Krisztina Czakó	Hungary	(gold) Hungarian Championships (1992–98)	
Krisztina Czakó	Hungary	(silver) European Championships (1997); World Junior Championships (1994)	
Krisztina Czakó	Hungary	(bronze) World Junior Championships (1995)	
Alissa Czisny	United States	(gold) Grand Prix Final (2010); U.S. Championships (2009, 2011)	
Gabrielle Daleman	Canada	(gold) Winter Olympics (2018); Canadian Championships (2015, 2018)	
Gabrielle Daleman	Canada	(silver) Four Continents Championships (2017)	
Gabrielle Daleman	Canada	(bronze) World Championships (2017)	
Madeleine Daleng	Norway	(gold) Norwegian Championships (2003–06)	
Suzanne Davis	United States	(gold) U.S. Championships (1934)	
Dianne de Leeuw	Netherlands	(gold) World Championships (1975); European Championships (1976); Dutch Championships (1971–76)	
Dianne de Leeuw	Netherlands	(silver) Winter Olympics (1976); European Championships (1974–75)	
Dianne de Leeuw	Netherlands	(bronze) World Championships (1974, 1976)	
Angela Derochie	Canada	(gold) Canadian Championships (1998)	
Phoebe Di Tommaso	Australia	(gold) Australian Championships (2011)	
Candice Didier	France	(gold) French Championships (2003–04, 2009)	
Gwendoline Didier	France	(gold) French Championships (2008)	
Sjoukje Dijkstra	Netherlands	(gold) Winter Olympics (1964); European Championships (1960–64)	
Sjoukje Dijkstra	Netherlands	(silver) Winter Olympics (1960); European Championships (1959)	
Viktoria Dimitrova	Bulgaria	(gold) Bulgarian Championships (1991-93)	
Patricia Dodd	Great Britain	(gold) British Championships (1969-71)	
Jennifer Don	Chinese Taipei	(gold) Chinese Taipei Championships (2006)	
Tamara Dorofejev	Hungary	(gold) Hungarian Championships (2001)	
Ksenia Doronina	Russia	(gold) Russian Championships (2007–08)	
Liana Drahová	Czechoslovakia	(gold) Czechoslovak Championships (1972–75)	
Liana Drahová	Czechoslovakia	(bronze) European Championships (1974)	
Alisa Drei	Finland	(gold) Finnish Championships (1997–98, 2003–04)	
Susanna Driano	Italy	(gold) Italian Championships (1975-80)	
Susanna Driano	Italy	(bronze) European Championships (1977, 1980)	
Jacqueline du Bief	France	(gold) French Championships (1947-52)	
Jacqueline du Bief	France	(silver) European Championships (1951–52)	
Jacqueline du Bief	France	(bronze) Winter Olympics (1952); European Championships (1950)	
Sanda Dubravčić	Yugoslavia	(gold) Yugoslav Championships (1996-77, 1979-82, 1984)	
Sanda Dubravčić	Yugoslavia	(silver) European Championships (1981)	
Eva Ďurišinová	Czechoslovakia	(gold) Czechoslovak Championships (1977)	
Annette Dytrt	Germany	(gold) German Championships (2003–06, 2009)	
Annette Dytrt	Czech Republic	(gold) Czech Championships (1999)	
Polina Edmunds	United States	(gold) Four Continents Championships (2015)	
Hanna Eigel	Austria	(gold) European Championships (1955, 1957); Austrian Championships (1957)	
Galina Efremenko	Ukraine	(gold) Ukrainian Championships (2000, 2002, 2004)	
Rietje van Erkel	Netherlands	(gold) Dutch Championships (1950)	
Christine Errath	East Germany	(gold) European Championships (1973–75); East German Championships (1974–75)	
Christine Errath	East Germany	(bronze) Winter Olympics (1976); European Championships (1976)	
Lisa Ervin	United States	(silver) World Junior Championships (1991–93)	
Sara Falotico	Belgium	(gold) Belgian Championships (2002, 2004–05)	
Fang Dan	China	(gold) Chinese Championships (2000, 2002–03)	
Alexandra Feigin	Bulgaria	(gold) Bulgarian Championships (2019–21, 2023–26)	
Morgan Figgins	New Zealand	(gold) New Zealand Championships (2006–08, 2012)	
Alice Fischer	Switzerland	(gold) Swiss Championships (1956–57)	
Eva-Maria Fitze	Germany	(gold) German Championships (1997, 1999)	
Anina Fivian	Switzerland	(gold) Swiss Championships (1997–98)	
Rachael Flatt	United States	(gold) U.S. Championships (2010); World Junior Championships (2008)	
Rachael Flatt	United States	(silver) Junior Grand Prix Final (2007)	
Peggy Fleming	United States	(gold) Winter Olympics (1968); World Championships (1966–68); U.S. Championships (1964–68)	
Peggy Fleming	United States	(bronze) World Championships (1965)	
Linda Florkevich	Canada	(bronze) World Junior Championships (1986)	
Silvia Fontana	Italy	(gold) Italian Championships (1994–95, 1999–2000, 2002)	
Kerstin Frank	Austria	(gold) Austrian Championships (2012–17)	
Linda Fratianne	United States	(gold) World Championships (1977, 1979); U.S. Championships (1977–80)	
Linda Fratianne	United States	(silver) Winter Olympics (1980); World Championships (1978)	
Linda Fratianne	United States	(bronze) World Championships (1980)	
Kathrin Freudelsperger	Austria	(gold) Austrian Championships (2007)	
Karin Frohner	Austria	(bronze) European Championships (1962)	
Fu Caishu	China	(gold) Chinese Championships (1986)	
Melissandre Fuentes	Andorra	(gold) Andorran Championships (2004–05, 2007–08)	
Yukiko Fujisawa	Japan	(silver) Junior Grand Prix Final (2008)	
Rūta Gajauskaitė	Lithuania	(gold) Lithuanian Championships (2006)	
Anastasiya Galustyan	Armenia	(gold) Armenian Championships (2015-18)	
Hanne Gamborg	Denmark	(gold) Danish Championships (1983-84)	
Christina Gao	United States	(bronze) Junior Grand Prix Final (2009)	
Petya Gavazova	Bulgaria	(gold) Bulgarian Championships (1985)	
Elene Gedevanishvili	Georgia	(gold) Georgian Championships (2003)	
Elene Gedevanishvili	Georgia	(bronze) European Championships (2010, 2012)	
Manouk Gijsman	Netherlands	(gold) Dutch Championships (2009–10, 2012)	
Alexe Gilles	United States	(bronze) Junior Grand Prix Final (2008)	
Anastasia Gimazetdinova	Uzbekistan	(gold) Uzbekistani Championships (2003–05, 2010–11)	
Vanessa Giunchi	Italy	(gold) Italian Championships (1995, 2001)	
Stefania Gladki	France	(gold) French Championships (2025-26)	
Georgia Glastris	Greece	(gold) Greek Championships (2010–11, 2013)	
Jelena Glebova	Estonia	(gold) Estonian Championships (2004–05, 2007, 2009–10, 2012–13)	
Amber Glenn	United States	(gold) Grand Prix Final (2024); U.S. Championships (2024-25)	
Gracie Gold	United States	(gold) U.S. Championships (2014, 2016)	
Gracie Gold	United States	(silver) World Junior Championships (2012)	
Gracie Gold	United States	(bronze) Winter Olympics (2014)	
Jekaterina Golovatenko	Estonia	(gold) Estonian Championships (1995)	
Natalia Gorbenko	Soviet Union	(gold) World Junior Championships (1986)	
Natalia Gorbenko	Soviet Union	(bronze) World Junior Championships (1985)Soviet Championships (1989)	
Johanna Götesson	Sweden	(gold) Swedish Championships (2004)	
Anastasia Gozhva	Ukraine	(gold) Ukrainian Championships (2016, 2023-24)	
Nicole Graf	Switzerland	(gold) Swiss Championships (2009)	
Barbara Gratton	Canada	(gold) Canadian Championships (1953-54)	
Dorothy Greenhough-Smith	Great Britain	(gold) British Championships (1908, 1911)	
Dorothy Greenhough-Smith	Great Britain	(silver) World Championships (1912)	
Dorothy Greenhough-Smith	Great Britain	(bronze) Summer Olympics (1908)	
Wendy Griner	Canada	(gold) Canadian Championships (1960-63)	
Wendy Griner	Canada	(silver) World Championships (1962)	
Daša Grm	Slovenia	(gold) Slovenian Championships (2014–20, 2023)	
Evelyn Großmann	East Germany	(gold) European Championships (1990); East German Championships (1989)	
Evelyn Großmann	Germany	(silver) European Championships (1991)	
Anastasiia Gubanova	Russia	(silver) Junior Grand Prix Final (2016)	
Anastasiia Gubanova	Georgia	(gold) European Championships (2023)	
Anastasiia Gubanova	Georgia	(silver) European Championships (2024-25)	
Vanessa Gusmeroli	France	(gold) French Championships (2000–02)	
Vanessa Gusmeroli	France	(bronze) World Championships (1997)	
Lara Naki Gutmann	Italy	(gold) Italian Championships (2021-23, 2026)	
Joan Haanappel	Netherlands	(gold) Dutch Championships (1955-58)	
Joan Haanappel	Netherlands	(bronze) European Championships (1958–60)	
Katharina Häcker	Germany	(gold) German Championships (2002)	
Helery Hälvin	Estonia	(gold) Estonian Championships (2014, 2016-17)	
Malin Hållberg-Leuf	Sweden	(gold) Swedish Championships (2006)	
Dorothy Hamill	United States	(gold) Winter Olympics (1976); World Championships (1976); U.S. Championships (1974–76)	
Dorothy Hamill	United States	(silver) World Championships (1974–75)	
Reyna Hamui	Mexico	(gold) Mexican Championships (2012-13, 2015)	
Brooklee Han	Australia	(gold) Australian Championships (2014)	
Kaja Hanevold	Norway	(gold) Norwegian Championships (1995–98, 2001)	
Angela Hanka	Austria	(silver) World Championships (1914)	
Lorraine Hanlon	United States	(gold) U.S. Championships (1963)	
Michaela Lucie Hanzlíková	Czech Republic	(gold) Czech Championships (2017)	
Jacqueline Harbord	Great Britain	(gold) British Championships (1962)	
Tonya Harding	United States	(gold) U.S. Championships (1991)	
Tonya Harding	United States	(silver) World Championships (1991)	
Danielle Harrison	Great Britain	(gold) British Championships (2016)	
Erle Harstad	Norway	(gold) Norwegian Championships (2008–10)	
Nicole Hassler	France	(gold) French Championships (1960, 1962-66)	
Nicole Hassler	France	(silver) European Championships (1963)	
Nicole Hassler	France	(bronze) World Championships (1963); European Championships (1964–66)	
Sarah Hecken	Germany	(gold) German Championships (2008, 2010–11, 2013)	
Idora Hegel	Croatia	(gold) Croatian Championships (2000–05, 2007)	
Tamara Heggen	Australia	(gold) Australian Championships (1991-93)	
Bettina Heim	Switzerland	(gold) Swiss Championships (2011)	
Carol Heiss	United States	(gold) Winter Olympics (1960); World Championships (1956-60); U.S. Championships (1957–60)	
Carol Heiss	United States	(silver) Winter Olympics (1956); World Championships (1955)	
Regine Heitzer	Austria	(gold) European Championships (1965–66)	
Regine Heitzer	Austria	(silver) Winter Olympics (1964); European Championships (1960–62, 1964)	
Regine Heitzer	Austria	(bronze) European Championships (1963)	
Joshi Helgesson	Sweden	(gold) Swedish Championships (2013, 2016–17)	
Viktoria Helgesson	Sweden	(gold) Swedish Championships (2007–12, 2014–15)	
Loena Hendrickx	Belgium	(gold) European Championships (2024); Belgian Championships (2017–19, 2022–23)	
Loena Hendrickx	Belgium	(silver) World Championships (2022); European Championships (2023); Grand Prix Final (2023)	
Loena Hendrickx	Belgium	(bronze) World Championships (2023); European Championships (2022); Grand Prix Final (2022)	
Karin Hendschke	East Germany	(gold) World Junior Championships (1984)	
Karin Hendschke	East Germany	(silver) World Junior Championships (1983)	
Sonja Henie	Norway	(gold) Winter Olympics (1928, 1932, 1936); World Championships (1927–36); European Championships (1931–36); Norwegian Championships (1923–29)	
Sonja Henie	Norway	(silver) World Championships (1926)	
Jenny Herz	Austria	(silver) World Championships (1906-07)	
Wakaba Higuchi	Japan	(silver) Winter Olympics (2022); World Championships (2018)	
Wakaba Higuchi	Japan	(bronze) World Junior Championships (2015–16); Junior Grand Prix Final (2014)	
Vicki Holland	Australia	(gold) Australian Championships (1981-84)	
Hilde Holovsky	Austria	(gold) Austrian Championships (1932-33)	
Hilde Holovsky	Austria	(silver) World Championships (1931)	
Hilde Holovsky	Austria	(bronze) World Championships (1933); European Championships (1931)	
Marin Honda	Japan	(gold) World Junior Championships (2016)	
Marin Honda	Japan	(silver) World Junior Championships (2017)	
Marin Honda	Japan	(bronze) Junior Grand Prix Final (2015)	
Rika Hongo	Japan	(bronze) Four Continents Championships (2015–16)	
Ilse Hornung	Austria	(silver) European Championships (1930)	
Věra Hrubá	Czechoslovakia	(gold) Czechoslovak Championships (1936-37)	
Laëtitia Hubert	France	(gold) French Championships (1998–99); World Junior Championships (1992)	
Maja Hug	Switzerland	(gold) Swiss Championships (1945–50)	
Emily Hughes	United States	(silver) Four Continents Championships (2007)	
Emily Hughes	United States	(bronze) World Junior Championships (2005)	
Sarah Hughes	United States	(gold) Winter Olympics (2002)	
Sarah Hughes	United States	(silver) World Junior Championships (1999); Junior Grand Prix Final (1998)	
Sarah Hughes	United States	(bronze) World Championships (2001); Grand Prix Final (2000–01)	
Vivi-Anne Hultén	Sweden	(gold) Swedish Championships (1927-29, 1933-34)	
Vivi-Anne Hultén	Sweden	(bronze) Winter Olympics (1936); European Championships (1930, 1932)	
Shirene Human	South Africa	(gold) South African Championships (1996–2003, 2005)	
Susan Humphreys	Canada	(gold) Canadian Championships (1997)	
Svetlana Issakova	Estonia	(gold) Estonian Championships (2008)	
Karin Iten	Switzerland	(gold) Swiss Championships (1973–75)	
Karin Iten	Switzerland	(bronze) European Championships (1973)	
Midori Ito	Japan	(gold) World Championships (1989); Japan Championships (1985–92, 1996)	
Midori Ito	Japan	(silver) Winter Olympics (1992); World Championships (1990)	
Midori Ito	Japan	(bronze) World Junior Championships (1984)	
Elena Ivanova	Russia	(gold) World Junior Championships (1996)	
Elena Ivanova	Russia	(silver) World Junior Championships (1995, 1998)	
Elena Ivanova	Russia	(bronze) World Junior Championships (1997)	
Kira Ivanova	Soviet Union	(silver) World Championships (1985); European Championships (1985–88); World Junior Championships (1978)	
Kira Ivanova	Soviet Union	(bronze) Winter Olympics (1984)	
Susan Jackson	Great Britain	(gold) British Championships (1984-85)	
Vanessa James	Great Britain	(gold) British Championships (2006)	
Diana Janostakova	Slovakia	(gold) Slovak Championships (2000)	
Astrid Jansen	Netherlands	(gold) Dutch Championships (1978-80)	
Ksenija Jastsenjski	Serbia	(gold) Serbian Championships (2003–08)	
Ksenija Jastsenjski	Yugoslavia	(gold) Yugoslavian Championships (1995, 2002)	
Yolande Jobin	Switzerland	(gold) Swiss Championships (1951)	
Lina Johansson	Sweden	(gold) Swedish Championships (2005)	
Lina Johansson	Sweden	(silver) Junior Grand Prix Final (2003)	
Karina Johnson	Denmark	(gold) Danish Championships (2009–12)	
Phyllis Johnson	Great Britain	(gold) British Championships (1921)	
Phyllis Johnson	Great Britain	(silver) World Championships (1913)	
Phyllis Johnson	Great Britain	(bronze) World Championships (1912, 1914)	
Valérie Jones	Canada	(gold) Canadian Championships (1967)	
Zoe Jones	Great Britain	(gold) British Championships (2001–02)	
Sarina Joos	Italy	(gold) Italian Championships (2024)	
Magda Julin	Sweden	(gold) Summer Olympics (1920); Swedish Championships (1911, 1916, 1918)	
Anna Jurkiewicz	Poland	(gold) Polish Championships (2007–09, 2011)	
Inge Kabisch	East Germany	(gold) East German Championships (1952–55)	
Caryn Kadavy	United States	(bronze) World Championships (1987)	
Livia Kaiser	Switzerland	(gold) Swiss Championships (2023)	
Nadezda Kanaeva	Russia	(bronze) World Junior Championships (1996)	
Alena Kanysheva	Russia	(bronze) Junior Grand Prix Final (2018)	
Tuğba Karademir	Turkey	(gold) Turkish Championships (1995)	
Yukiko Kashihara	Japan	(bronze) World Junior Championships (1988)	
Tamar Katz	Israel	(gold) Israeli Championships (2005)	
Gail Keddie	Great Britain	(gold) British Championships (1975)	
Heather Kemkaran	Canada	(gold) Canadian Championships (1978, 1980)	
Nancy Kerrigan	United States	(gold) U.S. Championships (1993)	
Nancy Kerrigan	United States	(silver) Winter Olympics (1994); World Championships (1992)	
Nancy Kerrigan	United States	(bronze) Winter Olympics (1992); World Championships (1991)	
Elina Kettunen	Finland	(gold) Finnish Championships (2001)	
Marina Khalturina	Kazakhstan	(gold) Kazakhstani Championships (2001)	
Crystal Kiang	Chinese Taipei	(gold) Chinese Taipei Championships (2013)	
Marina Kielmann	West Germany	(bronze) European Championships (1990)	
Marina Kielmann	Germany	(gold) German Championships (1991–93)	
Marina Kielmann	Germany	(silver) European Championships (1992)	
Marina Kielmann	Germany	(bronze) European Championships (1991, 1993)	
Mikkeline Kierkgaard	Denmark	(gold) Danish Championships (2000)	
Rika Kihira	Japan	(gold) Four Continents Championships (2019–20); Grand Prix Final (2018); Japan Championships (2020–21)	
Eva-Lotta Kiibus	Estonia	(gold) Estonian Championships (2020–21)	
Kim Chae-hwa	South Korea	(gold) South Korean Championships (2007)	
Kim Chae-yeon	South Korea	(gold) Four Continents Championships (2025); South Korean Championships (2025)	
Kim Chae-yeon	South Korea	(silver) Four Continents Championships (2024)	
Kim Chae-yeon	South Korea	(bronze) World Championships (2024); Junior Grand Prix Final (2022)	
Kim Na-young	South Korea	(gold) South Korean Championships (2008–09)	
Netty Kim	Canada	(gold) Canadian Championships (1995)	
Kim Ye-lim	South Korea	(gold) South Korean Championships (2021)	
Kim Ye-lim	South Korea	(silver) Four Continents Championships (2023)	
Kim Ye-lim	South Korea	(bronze) Four Continents Championships (2022)	
Kim Yong-suk	North Korea	(gold) North Korean Championships (2001, 2003–07)	
Yuna Kim	South Korea	(gold) Winter Olympics (2010); World Championships (2009, 2013); Four Continents Championships (2009); Grand Prix Final (2006–07, 2009); South Korean Championships (2003–06, 2013–14); World Junior Championships (2006); Junior Grand Prix Final (2005)	
Yuna Kim	South Korea	(silver) Winter Olympics (2014); World Championships (2010–11); Grand Prix Final (2008); World Junior Championships (2005); Junior Grand Prix Final (2004)	
Yuna Kim	South Korea	(bronze) World Championships (2007–08)	
Jennifer Kirk	United States	(gold) Four Continents Championships (2002); World Junior Championships (2000)	
Jennifer Kirk	United States	(silver) Junior Grand Prix Final (1999)	
Jennifer Kirk	United States	(bronze) Four Continents Championships (2005)	
Marilena Kitromilis	Cyprus	(gold) Cyprus Championships (2023)	
Barbara Klerk	Belgium	(gold) Belgian Championships (2008–09)	
Sonya Klopfer	United States	(gold) U.S. Championships (1951)	
Sonya Klopfer	United States	(silver) World Championships (1952)	
Sonya Klopfer	United States	(bronze) World Championships (1953)	
Simone Koch	East Germany	(gold) World Junior Championships (1983)	
Simone Koch	East Germany	(silver) World Junior Championships (1984)	
Denise Koegl	Austria	(gold) Austrian Championships (2008)	
Kumiko Koiwai	Japan	(gold) World Junior Championships (1993)	
Mojca Kopač	Slovenia	(gold) Slovenian Championships (1992–97, 2002–04)	
Polina Korobeynikova	Russia	(bronze) Junior Grand Prix Final (2011)	
Kiira Korpi	Finland	(gold) Finnish Championships (2009, 2011–13, 2015)	
Kiira Korpi	Finland	(silver) European Championships (2012)	
Kiira Korpi	Finland	(bronze) European Championships (2007, 2011)	
Carolina Kostner	Italy	(gold) World Championships (2012); European Championships (2007–08, 2010, 2012–13); Grand Prix Final (2011); Italian Championships (2003, 2005–07, 2009, 2011, 2013, 2017–18)	
Carolina Kostner	Italy	(silver) World Championships (2008, 2013); European Championships (2009, 2011); Grand Prix Final (2010); Junior Grand Prix Final (2002)	
Carolina Kostner	Italy	(bronze) Winter Olympics (2014); World Championships (2005, 2011, 2014); European Championships (2006, 2014, 2017–18); Grand Prix Final (2007–08); World Junior Championships (2003)	
Alena Kostornaia	Russia	(gold) European Championships (2020); Grand Prix Final (2019); Junior Grand Prix Final (2018)	
Alena Kostornaia	Russia	(silver) World Junior Championships (2018); Junior Grand Prix Final (2017)	
Hana Knapová	Czechoslovakia	(gold) Czechoslovak Championships (1976)	
Jindra Kramperová	Czechoslovakia	(gold) Czechoslovak Championships (1957-59)	
Lucie Krausová	Czech Republic	(gold) Czech Championships (2001–03)	
Andrea Kreuzer	Austria	(gold) Austrian Championships (2006)	
Nathalie Krieg	Switzerland	(gold) Swiss Championships (1993–94)	
Tanja Krienke	East Germany	(gold) East German Championships (1990)	
Tanja Krienke	East Germany	(bronze) World Junior Championships (1990)	
Marion Krijgsman	Netherlands	(gold) Dutch Championships (1991-92, 1998-99)	
Claudia Kristofics-Binder	Austria	(gold) European Championships (1982); Ausrian Championships (1977-82)	
Claudia Kristofics-Binder	Austria	(bronze) World Championships (1981-82); European Championships (1981)	
Lenka Kulovaná	Czechoslovakia	(gold) Czechoslovak Championships (1990-93)	
Lenka Kulovaná	Czech Republic	(gold) Czech Championships (1996-98)	
Ekaterina Kurakova	Poland	(gold) Polish Championships (2019–26)	
Maciej Kuś	Poland	(gold) Polish Championships (2004–05)	
Michelle Kwan	United States	(gold) World Championships (1996, 1998, 2000–01, 2003); Grand Prix Final (1995); U.S. Championships (1996, 1998–2005); World Junior Championships (1994)	
Michelle Kwan	United States	(silver) Winter Olympics (1998); World Championships (1997, 1999, 2002); Grand Prix Final (1996, 1999–2001)	
Michelle Kwan	United States	(bronze) Winter Olympics (2002); World Championships (2004)	
Amélie Lacoste	Canada	(gold) Canadian Championships (2012)	
Sonia Lafuente	Spain	(gold) Spanish Championships (2006, 2010, 2012–16)	
Liselotte Landbeck	Austria	(gold) Austrian Championships (1934-35)	
Liselotte Landbeck	Austria	(silver) European Championships (1934–35)	
Liselotte Landbeck	Austria	(bronze) World Championships (1934)	
Zahra Lari	United Arab Emirates	(gold) Emirati Championships (2015, 2017)	
Julia Lautowa	Austria	(gold) Austrian Championships (1994, 1997, 2000, 2002–04)	
Yulia Lavrenchuk	Ukraine	(gold) Ukrainian Championships (1995, 1997)	
Yulia Lavrenchuk	Ukraine	(bronze) European Championships (1997)	
Natalia Lebedeva	Soviet Union	(gold) Soviet Championships (1984, 1990)	
Natalia Lebedeva	Soviet Union	(silver) European Championships (1989–90)	
Cheltzie Lee	Australia	(gold) Australian Championships (2010)	
Lee Hae-in	South Korea	(gold) Four Continents Championships (2023)	
Lee Hae-in	South Korea	(silver) World Championships (2023); Four Continents Championships (2022)	
Claudia Leistner	West Germany	(gold) European Championships (1989); German Championships (1985-89)	
Claudia Leistner	West Germany	(silver) World Championships (1983, 1989)	
Claudia Leistner	West Germany	(bronze) European Championships (1983, 1985)	
Alena Leonova	Russia	(gold) World Junior Championships (2009)	
Alena Leonova	Russia	(silver) World Championships (2012)	
Alena Leonova	Russia	(bronze) Grand Prix Final (2011)	
Laura Lepistö	Finland	(gold) European Championships (2009); Finnish Championships (2008, 2010)	
Laura Lepistö	Finland	(silver) European Championships (2010)	
Laura Lepistö	Finland	(bronze) World Championships (2010); European Championships (2008)	
Dagmar Lerchová	Czechoslovakia	(gold) Czechoslovak Championships (1951-52, 1955)	
Anna Levandi	Soviet Union	(gold) Soviet Championships (1985–87)	
Anna Levandi	Soviet Union	(silver) World Championships (1984)	
Anna Levandi	Soviet Union	(bronze) European Championships (1984, 1986–88)	
Isabeau Levito	United States	(gold) U.S. Championships (2023); World Junior Championships (2022)	
Isabeau Levito	United States	(silver) World Championships (2024); Grand Prix Final (2022)	
Li Xiangning	China	(gold) Chinese Championships (2018)	
Li Zijun	China	(gold) Chinese Championships (2011-13, 2015)	
Li Zijun	China	(bronze) Four Continents Championships (2014); Junior Grand Prix Final (2010)	
Beatrisa Liang	United States	(bronze) Four Continents Championships (2006)	
Elena Liashenko	Ukraine	(silver) European Championships (2004)	
Elena Liashenko	Ukraine	(bronze) European Championships (1995, 2005)	
Gerli Liinamäe	Estonia	(gold) Estonian Championships (2011, 2015, 2018-19)	
Liina-Grete Lilender	Estonia	(gold) Estonian Championships (1997)	
Eva Lim	Netherlands	(gold) Dutch Championships (2014)	
Amy Lin	Chinese Taipei	(gold) Chinese Taipei Championships (2016-19)	
Viveca Lindfors	Finland	(gold) Finnish Championships (2019)	
Viveca Lindfors	Finland	(bronze) European Championships (2019)	
Tara Lipinski	United States	(gold) Winter Olympics (1998); World Championships (1997); Grand Prix Final (1996–97); U.S. Championships (1997)	
Yulia Lipnitskaya	Russia	(gold) Winter Olympics (2014); European Championships (2014); World Junior Championships (2012); Junior Grand Prix Final (2011)	
Yulia Lipnitskaya	Russia	(silver) World Championships (2014); Grand Prix Final (2013); World Junior Championships (2013)	
Alysa Liu	United States	(gold) World Championships (2025); Grand Prix Final (2025); U.S. Championships (2019–20)	
Alysa Liu	United States	(silver) Junior Grand Prix Final (2019)	
Alysa Liu	United States	(bronze) World Championships (2022); World Junior Championships (2020)	
Chaochih Liu	Chinese Taipei	(gold) Chinese Taipei Championships (2009)	
Liu Yan	China	(gold) Chinese Championships (2005, 2007-10)	
Beatrix Loughran	United States	(gold) U.S. Championships (1925–27)	
Beatrix Loughran	United States	(silver) Winter Olympics (1924)	
Beatrix Loughran	United States	(bronze) Winter Olympics (1928); World Championships (1924)	
Roxana Luca	Romania	(gold) Romanian Championships (1999-2009)	
Dagmar Lurz	West Germany	(gold) German Championships (1977–80)	
Dagmar Lurz	West Germany	(silver) World Championships (1980); European Championships (1977–80)	
Dagmar Lurz	West Germany	(bronze) Winter Olympics (1980); World Championships (1977)	
Janet Lynn	United States	(gold) U.S. Championships (1969–73)	
Janet Lynn	United States	(silver) World Championships (1973)	
Janet Lynn	United States	(bronze) Winter Olympics (1972); World Championships (1972)	
Emmy Ma	Chinese Taipei	(gold) Chinese Taipei Championships (2020)	
Nellie Maas	Netherlands	(gold) Dutch Championships (1954)	
Anita Madsen	Denmark	(gold) Danish Championships (2013–14)	
Karen Magnussen	Canada	(silver) World Championships (1973); Canadian Championships (1968, 1970-73)	
Karen Magnussen	Canada	(silver) Winter Olympics (1972); World Championships (1972)	
Karen Magnussen	Canada	(bronze) World Championships (1971)	
Stephanie Main	Great Britain	(gold) British Championships (1994, 1996-97)	
Tatiana Malinina	Uzbekistan	(gold) Four Continents Championships (1999); Grand Prix Final (1998); Uzbek Championships (1993–2002)	
Jubilee Jenna Mandl	Austria	(gold) Austrian Championships (1998–99)	
Elizabeth Manley	Canada	(gold) Canadian Championships (1985, 1987-88)	
Elizabeth Manley	Canada	(silver) Winter Olympics (1988); World Championships (1988)	
Elizabeth Manley	Canada	(bronze) World Junior Championships (1982)	
Miriam Manzano	Australia	(gold) Australian Championships (1994, 2002–06)	
Lejeanne Marais	South Africa	(gold) South African Championships (2008–09, 2011–13)	
Valentina Marchei	Italy	(gold) Italian Championships (2004, 2008, 2010, 2012, 2014)	
Sabina Măriuță	Romania	(gold) Romanian Championships (2011-13)	
Olga Markova	Russia	(gold) Russian Championships (1994)	
Olga Markova	Russia	(silver) European Championships (1995)	
Olga Markova	Russia	(bronze) European Championships (1994)	
Hana Mašková	Czechoslovakia	(gold) European Championships (1968); Czechoslovak Championships (1965-69)	
Hana Mašková	Czechoslovakia	(silver) European Championships (1967, 1969)	
Hana Mašková	Czechoslovakia	(bronze) Winter Olympics (1968); World Championships (1967-68)	
Fleur Maxwell	Luxembourg	(gold) Luxembourgish Championships (2005, 2014-15)	
Norah McCarthy	Canada	(gold) Canadian Championships (1940)	
Jenna McCorkell	Great Britain	(gold) British Championships (2003-05, 2007-14)	
Ann Patrice McDonough	United States	(gold) World Junior Championships (2002); Junior Grand Prix Final (2000)	
Ann Patrice McDonough	United States	(silver) World Junior Championships (2001)	
Evgenia Medvedeva	Russia	(gold) World Championships (2016–17); European Championships (2016–17); Grand Prix Final (2015–16); Russian Championships (2016–17); World Junior Championships (2015); Junior Grand Prix Final (2014)	
Evgenia Medvedeva	Russia	(silver) Winter Olympics (2018); European Championships (2018)	
Evgenia Medvedeva	Russia	(bronze) World Championships (2019); World Junior Championships (2014); Junior Grand Prix Final (2013)	
Sarah Meier	Switzerland	(gold) European Championships (2011); Swiss Championships (2000–01, 2003, 2005–08, 2010)	
Sarah Meier	Switzerland	(silver) European Championships (2007–08)	
Sarah Meier	Switzerland	(bronze) Grand Prix Final (2006); World Junior Championships (2000)	
Kimmie Meissner	United States	(gold) World Championships (2006); Four Continents Championships (2007); U.S. Championships (2007)	
Kimmie Meissner	United States	(silver) World Junior Championships (2004)	
Kimmie Meissner	United States	(bronze) Junior Grand Prix Final (2004)	
Maé-Bérénice Méité	France	(gold) French Championships (2014-16, 2018-20)	
Evgenia Melnik	Belarus	(gold) Belarusian Championships (2003-05)	
Gretchen Merrill	United States	(gold) U.S. Championships (1943–48)	
Gretchen Merrill	United States	(silver) European Championships (1947)	
Gretchen Merrill	United States	(bronze) World Championships (1947)	
Aneta Michałek	Poland	(gold) Polish Championships (2010)	
Mai Mihara	Japan	(gold) Four Continents Championships (2017, 2022); Grand Prix Final (2022)	
Mai Mihara	Japan	(silver) Four Continents Championships (2018)	
Mai Mihara	Japan	(bronze) Four Continents Championships (2019)	
Olga Mikutina	Austria	(gold) Austrian Championships (2020-21, 2024-26)	
Hannah Miller	United States	(silver) Junior Grand Prix Final (2012)	
Jessica Mills	United States	(gold) World Junior Championships (1989)	
Satoko Miyahara	Japan	(gold) Four Continents Championships (2016); Japan Championships (2015–18)	
Satoko Miyahara	Japan	(silver) World Championships (2015); Four Continents Championships (2014–15); Grand Prix Final (2015–16)	
Satoko Miyahara	Japan	(bronze) World Championships (2018); Four Continents Championships (2018)	
Gweneth Molony	Australia	(gold) Australian Championships (1990-52)	
Patricia Molony	Australia	(gold) Australian Championships (1948)	
Sonja Morgenstern	East Germany	(gold) East German Championships (1971–73)	
Sonja Morgenstern	East Germany	(bronze) European Championships (1972)	
Janet Morrissey	Canada	(gold) Canadian Championships (1979)	
Suzanne Morrow Francis	Canada	(gold) Canadian Championships (1949-51)	
Iryna Movchan	Ukraine	(gold) Ukrainian Championships (2009, 2011)	
Jana Mrázková	Czechoslovakia	(gold) Czechoslovak Championships (1960-64)	
Jana Mrázková	Czechoslovakia	(bronze) European Championships (1961)	
Ethel Muckelt	Great Britain	(bronze) Winter Olympics (1924)	
Jelena Muhhina	Estonia	(gold) Estonian Championships (2006)	
Victoria Muniz	Puerto Rico	(gold) Puerto Rican Championships (2005, 2007, 2009-10)	
Kanako Murakami	Japan	(gold) Four Continents Championships (2014); World Junior Championships (2010); Junior Grand Prix Final (2009)	
Kanako Murakami	Japan	(bronze) Four Continents Championships (2013); Grand Prix Final (2010)	
Mirai Nagasu	United States	(gold) U.S. Championships (2008); Junior Grand Prix Final (2007)	
Mirai Nagasu	United States	(silver) Four Continents Championships (2016); World Junior Championships (2007)	
Mirai Nagasu	United States	(bronze) Winter Olympics (2018); Four Continents Championships (2011, 2017); World Junior Championships (2008)	
Ami Nakai	Japan	(silver) Grand Prix Final (2025)	
Ami Nakai	Japan	(bronze) World Junior Championships (2023); Junior Grand Prix Final (2024)	
Yukari Nakano	Japan	(silver) Four Continents Championships (2006); World Junior Championships (2002)	
Yukari Nakano	Japan	(bronze) Four Continents Championships (2003); Grand Prix Final (2005); Junior Grand Prix Final (2000)	
Ludmila Nelidina	Russia	(silver) Junior Grand Prix Final (2001)	
Patricia Neske	West Germany	(gold) East German Championships (1995)	
Patricia Neske	West Germany	(bronze) European Championships (1989)	
Patricia Neske	Germany	(bronze) European Championships (1992)	
Lynn Nightingale	Canada	(gold) Canadian Championships (1974-77)	
Maria Nikitochkina	Belarus	(gold) Belarusian Championships (1995)	
Angela Nikodinov	United States	(gold) Four Continents Championships (2000)	
Angela Nikodinov	United States	(silver) Four Continents Championships (2001)	
Angela Nikodinov	United States	(bronze) Four Continents Championships (1999)	
Yuki Nishino	Japan	(bronze) Junior Grand Prix Final (2007)	
Belinda Noonan	Australia	(gold) Australian Championships (1980)	
Svea Norén	Sweden	(gold) Swedish Championships (1913, 1915, 1917, 1919)	
Svea Norén	Sweden	(silver) Summer Olympics (1920); World Championships (1922)	
Svea Norén	Sweden	(bronze) World Championships (1913, 1923)	
Myriam Oberwiler	Switzerland	(gold) Swiss Championships (1982, 1984)	
Kristina Oblasova	Russia	(gold) World Junior Championships (2001)	
Kristina Oblasova	Russia	(silver) Junior Grand Prix Final (2000)	
Eleanor O'Meara	Canada	(gold) Canadian Championships (1936, 1938)	
Yukina Ota	Japan	(gold) Four Continents Championships (2004); World Junior Championships (2003); Junior Grand Prix Final (2002)	
Yoshie Onda	Japan	(silver) Four Continents Championships (2005)	
Yoshie Onda	Japan	(bronze) Four Continents Championships (2001–02)	
Tamami Ono	Hong Kong	(gold) Hong Kong Championships (2004-06, 2008-10)	
Valda Osborn	Great Britain	(gold) European Championships (1953); British Championships (1952-53)	
Valda Osborn	Great Britain	(bronze) World Championships (1953)	
Kaetlyn Osmond	Canada	(gold) Winter Olympics (2018); World Championships (2018); Canadian Championships (2013–14, 2017)	
Kaetlyn Osmond	Canada	(silver) Winter Olympics (2014); World Championships (2017)	
Kaetlyn Osmond	Canada	(bronze) Winter Olympics (2018); Grand Prix Final (2017)	
Megan Oster	United States	(bronze) Junior Grand Prix Final (2006)	
Garnet Ostermeier	West Germany	(silver) World Junior Championships (1976)	
Yukina Ota	Japan	(gold) Four Continents Championships (2004); World Junior Championships (2003); Junior Grand Prix Final (2002)	
Anna Ovcharova	Switzerland	(gold) Swiss Championships (2014)	
Laurence Owen	United States	(gold) U.S. Championships (1961)	
Carole Pachl	Canada	(gold) Canadian Championships (1955-57)	
Vaike Paduri	Estonia	(gold) Estonian Championships (1930-34, 1936-38, 1940, 1947-48, 1950-52)	
Vaike Paduri	Soviet Union	(gold) Soviet Championships (1945)	
Alexia Paganini	Switzerland	(gold) Swiss Championships (2018–20, 2022)	
Maria-Elena Papasotiriou	Greece	(gold) Greek Championships (2008–09)	
Georgina Papavasiliou	Greece	(gold) Greek Championships (2001–04)	
Ami Parekh	India	(gold) Indian Championships (2004–07, 2011–14)	
Zara Pasfield	Australia	(gold) Australian Championships (2012)	
Park Bit-na	South Korea	(gold) South Korean Championships (2000-01)	
Carola Paul	East Germany	(bronze) World Junior Championships (1980)	
Patricia Pauley	Great Britain	(gold) British Championships (1959-60)	
Viktória Pavuk	Hungary	(gold) Hungarian Championships (2011)	
Viktória Pavuk	Hungary	(bronze) Junior Grand Prix Final (2003)	
Rudina Pasveer	Netherlands	(gold) Dutch Championships (1981)	
Eva Pawlik	Austria	(gold) European Championships (1949); Austrian Championships (1946-49)	
Eva Pawlik	Austria	(silver) Winter Olympics (1948); World Championships (1948); European Championships (1948)	
Dianne Peach	Great Britain	(gold) British Championships (1958)	
Nella Pelkonen	Finland	(gold) Finnish Championships (2024)	
Sofia Penkova	Bulgaria	(gold) Bulgarian Championships (1995-98)	
Stacey Pensgen	United States	(silver) Four Continents Championships (2000)	
Åsa Persson	Sweden	(gold) Swedish Championships (2003)	
Stefanie Pesendorfer	Austria	(gold) Austrian Championships (2022)	
Clara Peters	Ireland	(gold) Irish Championships (2009–10, 2012–15)	
Niina Petrõkina	Estonia	(gold) European Championships (2025); Estonian Championships (2022-23, 2026)	
Cynthia Phaneuf	Canada	(gold) Canadian Championships (2004, 2011)	
Cynthia Phaneuf	Canada	(silver) Four Continents Championships (2004)	
Isabelle Pieman	Belgium	(gold) Belgian Championships (2007, 2010, 2012)	
Abigail Pietersen	South Africa	(gold) South African Championships (2010)	
Elena Pingacheva	Russia	(silver) World Junior Championships (1996)	
Elena Pingacheva	Russia	(bronze) Junior Grand Prix Final (1997)	
Nina Pinzarrone	Belgium	(gold) Belgian Championships (2024-26)	
Nina Pinzarrone	Belgium	(bronze) European Championships (2024-25)	
Anna Pogorilaya	Russia	(silver) European Championships (2017)	
Anna Pogorilaya	Russia	(bronze) World Championships (2016); European Championships (2015–16); Grand Prix Final (2016); World Junior Championships (2013); Junior Grand Prix Final (2012)	
Yvonne Pokorny	Austria	(gold) Austrian Championships (1988-92)	
Teodora Poštič	Slovenia	(gold) Slovenian Championships (2006-10)	
Diána Póth	Hungary	(gold) Hungarian Championships (1999-2000)	
Anett Pötzsch	East Germany	(gold) Winter Olympics (1980); World Championships (1978, 1980); European Championships (1977–80); East German Championships (1976–80)	
Anett Pötzsch	East Germany	(silver) World Championships (1977, 1979); European Championships (1976)	
Anett Pötzsch	East Germany	(bronze) European Championships (1975)	
Nina Povey	Great Britain	(gold) British Championships (2024)	
Susanna Pöykiö	Finland	(gold) Finnish Championships (2000, 2002, 2005-07)	
Susanna Pöykiö	Finland	(silver) European Championships (2005)	
Susanna Pöykiö	Finland	(bronze) European Championships (2009); World Junior Championships (2001)	
Tara Prasad	India	(gold) Indian Championships (2022–23, 2025)	
Karen Preston	Canada	(gold) Canadian Championships (1989, 1992)	
Emmy Putzinger	Austria	(gold) Austrian Championships (1936-39)	
Emmy Putzinger	Austria	(bronze) European Championships (1937–38)	
Sonia Radeva	Bulgaria	(gold) Bulgarian Championships (2004-08)	
Elena Radionova	Russia	(gold) Russian Championships (2015); World Junior Championships (2013–14); Junior Grand Prix Final (2012)	
Elena Radionova	Russia	(silver) European Championships (2015–16); Grand Prix Final (2014)	
Elena Radionova	Russia	(bronze) World Championships (2015); Grand Prix Final (2015)	
Stasia Rage	Latvia	(gold) Latvian Championships (2008)	
Paulina Ramanauskaitė	Lithuania	(gold) Lithuanian Championships (2019)	
Gisela Reichmann	Austria	(gold) Austrian Championships (1913, 1917-18)	
Gisela Reichmann	Austria	(silver) World Championships (1923)	
Ivana Reitmayerová	Slovakia	(gold) Slovak Championships (2009-10)	
Elsa Rendschmidt	Germany	(gold) German Championships (1911)	
Elsa Rendschmidt	Germany	(silver) Summer Olympics (1908); World Championships (1908, 1910)	
Kimmy Repond	Switzerland	(gold) Swiss Championships (2024–25)	
Kimmy Repond	Switzerland	(bronze) European Championships (2023)	
Mary Ro Reyes	Mexico	(gold) Mexican Championships (2011)	
Karena Richardson	Great Britain	(gold) British Championships (1976-78, 1980)	
Danielle Rieder	Switzerland	(gold) Swiss Championships (1976–78)	
Mia Risa Gomez	Norway	(gold) Norwegian Championships (2023-26)	
Karly Robertson	Great Britain	(gold) British Championships (2015)	
Jennifer Robinson	Canada	(gold) Canadian Championships (1996, 1999-2003)	
Joannie Rochette	Canada	(gold) Canadian Championships (2005–10)	
Joannie Rochette	Canada	(silver) World Championships (2009); Four Continents Championships (2008–09)	
Joannie Rochette	Canada	(bronze) Winter Olympics (2010); Four Continents Championships (2007); Grand Prix Final (2004)	
Barbara Roles	United States	(gold) U.S. Championships (1962)	
Barbara Roles	United States	(bronze) Winter Olympics (1960); World Championships (1960)	
Oksana Romanenkova	Estonia	(gold) Estonian Championships (1987-90, 1992)	
Alexandra Rout	New Zealand	(gold) New Zealand Championships (2008-10, 2015-17)	
Manuela Ruben	West Germany	(gold) West German Championships (1982-84)	
Manuela Ruben	West Germany	(silver) European Championships (1984); World Junior Championships (1979)	
Lucinda Ruh	Switzerland	(gold) Swiss Championships (1996)	
Kaiya Ruiter	Canada	(gold) Canadian Championships (2024)	
Kaiya Ruiter	Canada	(bronze) Winter Youth Olympics (2024)	
Ekaterina Ryabova	Azerbaijan	(gold) Azerbaijani Championships (2019)	
Viktoriia Safonova	Belarus	(gold) Belarusian Championships (2020-25)	
Kaori Sakamoto	Japan	(gold) World Championships (2022–24); Four Continents Championships (2018); Grand Prix Final (2023); Japan Championships (2022–24)	
Kaori Sakamoto	Japan	(silver) Winter Olympics (2022); World Championships (2025)	
Kaori Sakamoto	Japan	(bronze) Winter Olympics (2022); Grand Prix Final (2024-25); World Junior Championships (2017); Junior Grand Prix Final (2016)	
Serafima Sakhanovich	Russia	(silver) World Junior Championships (2014–15); Junior Grand Prix Final (2013–14)	
Sofia Samodurova	Russia	(gold) European Championships (2019)	
Tammy Sear	Great Britain	(gold) British Championships (2000)	
Sonja Stanek	Austria	(gold) Austrian Championships (1983)	
Parthena Sarafidis	Austria	(gold) Austrian Championships (1984, 1986)	
Parthena Sarafidis	Austria	(bronze) World Junior Championships (1983)	
Lisa Sargeant	Canada	(gold) Canadian Championships (2990)	
Yuka Sato	Japan	(gold) World Championships (1994); World Junior Championships (1990); Japan Championships (1993-94)	
Julia Sauter	Romania	(gold) Romanian Championships (2014-17, 2019-25)	
Aki Sawada	Japan	(silver) Junior Grand Prix Final (2005)	
Jill Sawyer	United States	(gold) World Junior Championships (1978)	
Vanesa Šelmeková	Slovakia	(gold) Slovak Championships (2024-26)	
Aileen Shaw	Australia	(gold) Australian Championships (1959–62, 1964)	
Kathleen Shaw	Great Britain	(gold) British Championships (1927, 1929-30)	
Kathleen Shaw	Great Britain	(bronze) World Championships (1926)	
Anna Shcherbakova	Russia	(gold) Winter Olympics (2022); World Championships (2021); European Championships (2022); Russian Championships (2019–21)	
Anna Shcherbakova	Russia	(silver) European Championships (2020); Grand Prix Final (2019); World Junior Championships (2019)	
Lorine Schild	France	(gold) French Championships (2024)	
Annelies Schilhan	Austria	(gold) Austrian Championships (1952-54)	
Madeline Schizas	Canada	(gold) Canadian Championships (2022–23, 2025)	
Stéfanie Schmid	Switzerland	(gold) Swiss Championships (1988–89)	
Fränzi Schmidt	Switzerland	(gold) Swiss Championships (1961–62, 1964)	
Belinda Schönberger	Austria	(gold) Austrian Championships (2011)	
Trixi Schuba	Austria	(gold) Winter Olympics (1972); World Championships (1971–72); European Championships (1971–72); Austrian Championships (1967–72)	
Trixi Schuba	Austria	(silver) World Championships (1969–70); European Championships (1970)	
Trixi Schuba	Austria	(bronze) European Championships (1968–69)	
Barbara Ann Scott	Canada	(gold) Winter Olympics (1948); World Championships (1947–48); European Championships (1947–48); Canadian Championships (1944–46, 1948)	
Jean Scott	Great Britain	(gold) British Championships (1972, 1974)	
Jean Scott	Great Britain	(silver) European Championships (1973)	
Júlia Sebestyén	Hungary	(gold) European Championships (2004); Hungarian Championships (2002–10)	
Júlia Sebestyén	Hungary	(bronze) European Championships (2003)	
Gabriele Seyfert	East Germany	(gold) World Championships (1969–70); European Championships (1967, 1969–70); East German Championships (1961–70)	
Gabriele Seyfert	East Germany	(silver) Winter Olympics (1968); World Championships (1966–68); European Championships (1966, 1968)	
Ilona Senderek	Poland	(gold) Polish Championships (2005)	
Marina Serova	Soviet Union	(silver) World Junior Championships (1981)	
Polina Shelepen	Russia	(silver) Junior Grand Prix Final (2009, 2011)	
Julia Sheremet	Belarus	(gold) Belarusian Championships (2006, 2008)	
Yvonne Sherman	United States	(gold) U.S. Championships (1949–50)	
Yvonne Sherman	United States	(silver) World Championships (1949)	
Yvonne Sherman	United States	(bronze) World Championships (1950)	
Mao Shimada	Japan	(gold) Winter Youth Olympics (2024); World Junior Championships (2023–25); Junior Grand Prix Final (2022–25)	
Shin Ji-a	South Korea	(gold) Winter Youth Olympics (2024); South Korean Championships (2023–24)	
Shin Ji-a	South Korea	(silver) Winter Youth Olympics (2024); World Junior Championships (2022–25); Junior Grand Prix Final (2022–23)	
Shin Yea-ji	South Korea	(gold) South Korean Championships (1998–99, 2002)	
Nella Simaová	Czech Republic	(gold) Czech Championships (2008–09)	
Carolyn Skoczen	Canada	(gold) World Junior Championships (1977)	
Irina Slutskaya	Russia	(gold) World Championships (2002, 2005); European Championships (1996–97, 2000–01, 2003, 2005–06); Grand Prix Final (1999–2001, 2004); Russian Championships (2000–02; 2005); World Junior Championships (1995)	
Irina Slutskaya	Russia	(silver) Winter Olympics (2002); World Championships (1998, 2000–01); European Championships (1998, 2002); Grand Prix Final (1995, 2002, 2005)	
Irina Slutskaya	Russia	(bronze) Winter Olympics (2006); World Championships (1996); Grand Prix Final (1996, 1998); World Junior Championships (1994)	
Cecil Smith	Canada	(gold) Canadian Championships (1925-26)	
Cecil Smith	Canada	(silver) World Championships (1930)	
Marlene Smith	Canada	(gold) Canadian Championships (1952)	
Elena Sokolova	Russia	(gold) Russian Championships (2003–04, 2006)	
Elena Sokolova	Russia	(silver) World Championships (2003); European Championships (2003, 2006); World Junior Championships (1997)	
Elena Sokolova	Russia	(bronze) European Championships (2004)	
Julia Soldatova	Russia	(gold) World Junior Championships (1998); Junior Grand Prix Final (1997)	
Julia Soldatova	Russia	(silver) European Championships (1999)	
Julia Soldatova	Russia	(bronze) World Championships (1999)	
Julia Soldatova	Belarus	(gold) Belarusian Championships (2001–02)	
Maia Sørensen	Denmark	(gold) Danish Championships (2022-23)	
Pernille Sørensen	Denmark	(gold) Danish Championships (2015, 2018-19)	
Adelina Sotnikova	Russia	(gold) Winter Olympics (2014); Russian Championships (2009, 2011–12, 2014); World Junior Championships (2011); Junior Grand Prix Final (2010)	
Adelina Sotnikova	Russia	(silver) European Championships (2013–14); Winter Youth Olympics (2012);	
Adelina Sotnikova	Russia	(bronze) World Junior Championships (2012)	
Maria Sotskova	Russia	(gold) Junior Grand Prix Final (2013)	
Maria Sotskova	Russia	(silver) Grand Prix Final (2017); Winter Youth Olympics (2016); World Junior Championships (2016); Junior Grand Prix Final (2015)	
Kristen Spours	Great Britain	(gold) British Championships (2025-26)	
Sally-Anne Stapleford	Great Britain	(gold) British Championships (1964–68)	
Sally-Anne Stapleford	Great Britain	(silver) European Championships (1965)	
Heidemarie Steiner	East Germany	(gold) East German Championships (1960)	
Deanna Stellato-Dudek	United States	(gold) Junior Grand Prix Final (1999)	
Deanna Stellato-Dudek	United States	(silver) World Junior Championships (2000)	
Hedy Stenuf	United States	(silver) World Championships (1939)	
Hedy Stenuf	United States	(bronze) World Championships (1938)	
Sofja Stepčenko	Latvia	(gold) Latvian Championships (2023–24)	
Lidy Stoppelman	Netherlands	(gold) Dutch Championships (1951-53)	
Tina Stürzinger	Switzerland	(gold) Swiss Championships (2013)	
Yvonne Sugden	Great Britain	(gold) British Championships (1954–56)	
Yvonne Sugden	Great Britain	(silver) European Championships (1955–56)	
Yvonne Sugden	Great Britain	(bronze) European Championships (1954)	
Fumie Suguri	Japan	(gold) Four Continents Championships (2001, 2003, 2005); Grand Prix Final (2003); Japan Championships (1997, 2001–03, 2006)	
Fumie Suguri	Japan	(silver) World Championships (2006)	
Fumie Suguri	Japan	(bronze) World Championships (2002–03)	
Jane Sullivan	United States	(gold) U.S. Championships (1941–42)	
Rosalynn Sumners	United States	(gold) World Championships (1983); U.S. Championships (1982–84); World Junior Championships (1980)	
Rosalynn Sumners	United States	(silver) Winter Olympics (1984)	
Akiko Suzuki	Japan	(gold) Japan Championships (2014)	
Akiko Suzuki	Japan	(silver) Four Continents Championships (2010, 2013); Grand Prix Final (2011)	
Akiko Suzuki	Japan	(bronze) World Championships (2012); Grand Prix Final (2009, 2012); Junior Grand Prix Final (2001)	
Madge Syers	Great Britain	(gold) Summer Olympics (1908); World Championships (1906–07); British Championships (1903–04)	
Madge Syers	Great Britain	(silver) World Championships (1902) (Note: Before a separate women's category was added to the World Figure Skating Championships in 1906, Madge Syers competed in the same category with men.)	
Herma Szabo	Austria	(gold) Winter Olympics (1924); World Championships (1922–26); Austrian Championships (1922–25, 1927)	
Herma Szabo	Austria	(silver) World Championships (1927)	
Tanja Szewczenko	Germany	(gold) German Championships (1994–95, 1998)	
Tanja Szewczenko	Germany	(silver) Grand Prix Final (1997)	
Tanja Szewczenko	Germany	(bronze) World Championships (1994); European Championships (1998); World Junior Championships (1993)	
Josefin Taljegård	Sweden	(gold) Swedish Championships (2022, 2024-26)	
Marilyn Ruth Take	Canada	(gold) Canadian Championships (1947)	
Anastasia Tarakanova	Russia	(bronze) Junior Grand Prix Final (2017)	
Katy Taylor	United States	(gold) Four Continents Championships (2006)	
Katy Taylor	United States	(bronze) World Junior Championships (2004)	
Megan Taylor	Great Britain	(gold) World Championships (1938–39); British Championships (1932–34)	
Megan Taylor	Great Britain	(silver) World Championships (1934, 1936–37); European Championships (1937–39)	
Megan Taylor	Great Britain	(bronze) European Championships (1936)	
Mary Rose Thacker	Canada	(gold) Canadian Championships (1939, 1941-42)	
Bradie Tennell	United States	(gold) U.S. Championships (2018, 2021)	
Bradie Tennell	United States	(silver) Four Continents Championships (2025)	
Bradie Tennell	United States	(bronze) Winter Olympics (2018); Four Continents Championships (2020)	
Jūlija Tepliha	Latvia	(gold) Latvian Championships (2001)	
Cornelia Tesch	West Germany	(silver) World Junior Championships (1982)	
Debi Thomas	United States	(gold) World Championships (1986); U.S. Championships (1986, 1988)	
Debi Thomas	United States	(silver) World Championships (1987)	
Debi Thomas	United States	(bronze) Winter Olympics (1988); World Championships (1988)	
Kay Thomson	Canada	(gold) Canadian Championships (1982–84)	
Kay Thomson	Canada	(silver) World Junior Championships (1980)	
Lindsay Thorngren	United States	(bronze) World Junior Championships (2022)	
Daria Timoshenko	Russia	(gold) World Junior Championships (1999)	
Daria Timoshenko	Russia	(bronze) Junior Grand Prix Final (1998)	
Daria Timoshenko	Azerbaijan	(gold) Azerbaijani Championships (2002–03, 2005)	
Anisette Torp-Lind	Denmark	(gold) Danish Championships (1988-94)	
Joan Tozzer	United States	(gold) U.S. Championships (1938–40)	
Rita Trapanese	Italy	(gold) Italian Championships (1965–72)	
Rita Trapanese	Italy	(silver) European Championships (1972)	
Rita Trapanese	Italy	(bronze) European Championships (1971)	
Jill Trenary	United States	(gold) World Championships (1990); U.S. Championships (1987, 1989–90)	
Jill Trenary	United States	(bronze) World Championships (1989)	
Alexandra Trusova	Russia	(gold) Russian Championships (2022); World Junior Championships (2018–19); Junior Grand Prix Final (2017)	
Alexandra Trusova	Russia	(silver) Winter Olympics (2022); European Championships (2022); Junior Grand Prix Final (2018)	
Alexandra Trusova	Russia	(bronze) World Championships (2021); European Championships (2020); Grand Prix Final (2019)	
Polina Tsurskaya	Russia	(gold) Winter Youth Olympics (2016); Junior Grand Prix Final (2015)	
Elizaveta Tuktamysheva	Russia	(gold) World Championships (2015); European Championships (2015); Grand Prix Final (2014); Russian Championships (2013); Winter Youth Olympics (2012)	
Elizaveta Tuktamysheva	Russia	(silver) World Championships (2021); World Junior Championships (2011); Junior Grand Prix Final (2010)	
Elizaveta Tuktamysheva	Russia	(bronze) European Championships (2013); Grand Prix Final (2018)	
Konstantin Tupikov	Ukraine	(gold) Ukrainian Championships (2003)	
Konstantin Tupikov	Poland	(gold) Polish Championships (2008)	
Elizabet Tursynbaeva	Kazakhstan	(gold) Kazakhstani Championships (2015–17)	
Elizabet Tursynbaeva	Kazakhstan	(silver) World Championships (2019); Four Continents Championships (2019)	
Elizabet Tursynbaeva	Kazakhstan	(bronze) Winter Youth Olympics (2016)	
Ting Tzu-Han	Chinese Taipei	(gold) Chinese Taipei Championships (2022–24)	
Rena Uezono	Japan	(bronze) World Junior Championships (2024); Junior Grand Prix Final (2023)	
Daria Usacheva	Russia	(silver) World Junior Championships (2020)	
Daria Usacheva	Russia	(bronze) Junior Grand Prix Final (2019)	
Kamila Valieva	Russia	(gold) World Junior Championships (2020); Junior Grand Prix Final (2019)	
Kaat Van Daele	Belgium	(gold) Belgian Championships (2013-14)	
Monique van der Velden	Netherlands	(gold) Dutch Championships (1993-95)	
Lindsay van Zundert	Netherlands	(gold) Dutch Championships (2022-23)	
Ira Vannut	Belgium	(gold) Belgian Championships (2011)	
Meda Variakojytė	Lithuania	(gold) Lithuanian Championships (2024-26)	
Hristina Vassileva	Bulgaria	(gold) Bulgarian Championships (2000–03, 2011)	
Olga Vassiljeva	Estonia	(gold) Estonian Championships (1993–94, 1999–2003)	
Karen Venhuizen	Netherlands	(gold) Dutch Championships (2000–08)	
Kirsten Verbist	Belgium	(gold) Belgian Championships (2006)	
Hana Veselá	Czechoslovakia	(gold) Czechoslovak Championships (1982-84)	
Claudia Villiger	Switzerland	(gold) Swiss Championships (1985–87)	
Eleonora Vinnichenko	Ukraine	(gold) Ukrainian Championships (2007–08)	
Maribel Vinson	United States	(gold) U.S. Championships (1928–33, 1935–37)	
Maribel Vinson	United States	(silver) World Championships (1928)	
Maribel Vinson	United States	(bronze) Winter Olympics (1932); World Championships (1930); European Championships (1934)	
Elena Vodorezova	Soviet Union	(gold) Soviet Championships (1976–77, 1980, 1982–83)	
Elena Vodorezova	Soviet Union	(silver) European Championships (1983)	
Elena Vodorezova	Soviet Union	(bronze) World Championships (1983); European Championships (1978, 1982)	
Sydne Vogel	United States	(gold) World Junior Championships (1997)	
Viktoria Volchkova	Russia	(gold) Junior Grand Prix Final (1998)	
Viktoria Volchkova	Russia	(bronze) European Championships (1999–2002); Grand Prix Final (2002); World Junior Championships (1998–99)	
Charlene von Saher	Great Britain	(gold) British Championships (1993)	
Iveta Voralová	Czechoslovakia	(gold) Czechoslovak Championships (1987-89)	
Julia Vorobieva	Soviet Union	(gold) Soviet Championships (1991–92)	
Julia Vorobieva	Azerbaijan	(gold) Azerbaijani Championships (1994-2000)	
Gintarė Vostrecovaitė	Lithuania	(gold) Lithuanian Championships (2001–05)	
Alena Vrzáňová	Czechoslovakia	(gold) World Championships (1949–50); European Championships (1950); Czechoslovak Championships (1947–50)	
Alena Vrzáňová	Czechoslovakia	(silver) European Championships (1949)	
Alena Vrzáňová	Czechoslovakia	(bronze) European Championships (1948)	
Ashley Wagner	United States	(gold) Four Continents Championships (2012); U.S. Championships (2012–13, 2015)	
Ashley Wagner	United States	(silver) World Championships (2016); Grand Prix Final (2012); Junior Grand Prix Final (2006)	
Ashley Wagner	United States	(bronze) Winter Olympics (2014); Grand Prix Final (2013–14); World Junior Championships (2007, 2009)	
Tracey Wainman	Canada	(gold) Canadian Championships (1981, 1986)	
Daphne Walker	Great Britain	(gold) British Championships (1947)	
Daphne Walker	Great Britain	(silver) World Championships (1947)	
Daphne Walker	Great Britain	(bronze) World Championships (1939); European Championships (1939, 1947)	
Hanna Walter	Austria	(gold) European Championships (1959); Austrian Championships (1959)	
Hanna Walter	Austria	(silver) World Championships (1959); European Championships (1958)	
Hanna Walter	Austria	(bronze) World Championships (1958); European Championships (1957)	
Charlotte Walter	Switzerland	(gold) Swiss Championships (1968–72)	
Wang Huan	China	(gold) Chinese Championships (1999)	
Melinda Wang	Chinese Taipei	(gold) Chinese Taipei Championships (2008, 2011)	
Tina Wang	Australia	(gold) Australian Championships (2009)	
Wang Yihan	China	(gold) Chinese Championships (2024)	
Rinka Watanabe	Japan	(bronze) Four Continents Championships (2024)	
Theresa Weld	United States	(gold) U.S. Championships (1914, 1920–24)	
Theresa Weld	United States	(bronze) Summer Olympics (1920)	
Ingrid Wendl	Austria	(gold) European Championships (1956, 1958); Austrian Championships (1955–56, 1958)	
Ingrid Wendl	Austria	(silver) World Championships (1957); European Championships (1957)	
Ingrid Wendl	Austria	(bronze) Winter Olympics (1956); World Championships (1956–57)	
Anna Wenzel	Austria	(gold) Austrian Championships (2001)	
Kristin Wieczorek	Germany	(gold) German Championships (2007)	
Isadora Williams	Brazil	(gold) Brazilian Championships (2020)	
Constance Wilson-Samuel	Canada	(gold) Canadian Championships (1924, 1927, 1929-35)	
Constance Wilson-Samuel	Great Britain	(gold) British Championships (1928)	
Constance Wilson-Samuel	Canada	(bronze) World Championships (1932)	
Astrid Winkelman	Netherlands	(gold) Dutch Championships (1988, 199)	
Janina Wirth	East Germany	(gold) World Junior Championships (1982)	
Susi Wirz	Switzerland	(gold) Swiss Championships (1952)	
Katarina Witt	East Germany	(gold) Winter Olympics (1984, 1988); World Championships (1984–85, 1987–88); European Championships (1983–88); East German Championships (1981–88)	
Katarina Witt	East Germany	(silver) World Championships (1982, 1986); European Championships (1982)	
Sabina Wojtala	Poland	(gold) Polish Championships (1999–2003, 2006)	
Karen Wood	Great Britain	(gold) British Championships (1981, 1983)	
Niki Wories	Netherlands	(gold) Dutch Championships (2014-20, 2025)	
Barbara Wyatt	Great Britain	(bronze) European Championships (1951–52)	
Xu Binshu	China	(gold) Chinese Championships (2004, 2006)	
Xu Binshu	China	(bronze) Junior Grand Prix Final (2005)	
Junko Yaginuma	Japan	(silver) World Junior Championships (1988–89)	
Yasmine Yamada	Switzerland	(gold) Swiss Championships (2017)	
Kristi Yamaguchi	United States	(gold) Winter Olympics (1992); World Championships (1991–92); U.S. Championships (1992); World Junior Championships (1988)	
Mako Yamashita	Japan	(bronze) World Junior Championships (2018)	
Hana Yoshida	Japan	(bronze) Grand Prix Final (2023)	
You Young	South Korea	(gold) Winter Youth Olympics (2020); South Korean Championships (2016, 2018–20, 2022)	
You Young	South Korea	(silver) Four Continents Championships (2020)	
Olga Zadvornova	Latvia	(gold) Latvian Championships (2006)	
Alina Zagitova	Russia	(gold) Winter Olympics (2018); World Championships (2019); European Championships (2018); Grand Prix Final (2017); Russian Championships (2018); World Junior Championships (2017); Junior Grand Prix Final (2016)	
Alina Zagitova	Russia	(silver) Winter Olympics (2018); European Championships (2019); Grand Prix Final (2018)	
Agnes Zawadzki	United States	(silver) World Junior Championships (2010)	
Agnes Zawadzki	United States	(bronze) World Junior Championships (2011)	
Elaine Zayak	United States	(gold) World Championships (1982); U.S. Championships (1981); World Junior Championships (1979)	
Elaine Zayak	United States	(silver) World Championships (1981)	
Elaine Zayak	United States	(bronze) World Championships (1984)	
Irena Zemanová	Czech Republic	(gold) Czech Championships (1994)	
Caroline Zhang	United States	(gold) World Junior Championships (2007); Junior Grand Prix Final (2006)	
Caroline Zhang	United States	(silver) World Junior Championships (2008–09)	
Caroline Zhang	United States	(bronze) Four Continents Championships (2010, 2012)	
Zhang Kexin	China	(gold) Chinese Championships (2014)	
Stephanie Zhang	Australia	(gold) Australian Championships (2000–01)	
Zhao Ziquan	China	(gold) Chinese Championships (2016-17)	
Trifun Živanović	Yugoslavia	(gold) Yugoslavian Championships (2002)	
Trifun Živanović	Serbia and Montenegro	(gold) Serbia & Montenegro Championships (2003–06)	
Trifun Živanović	Serbia	(gold) Serbian Championships (2007)	
Christine Zukowski	United States	(bronze) World Junior Championships (2006)	
Daria Zuravicki	Israel	(gold) Israeli Championships (2001–02)	

== See also ==
- List of figure skaters (men's singles)
- List of figure skaters (pair skating)
- List of figure skaters (ice dance)
