= 2006 Four Continents Figure Skating Championships =

2006 Four Continents Championships
- Type: ISU Championship
- Date: January 25 – 28
- Season: 2005–06
- Location: Colorado Springs, USA
- Venue: World Arena

Champions
- Men's singles: (Japan) Nobunari Oda
- Ladies' singles: (United States) Katy Taylor
- Pairs: (United States) Rena Inoue / John Baldwin
- Ice dance: (United States) Tanith Belbin / Benjamin Agosto
- Previous: 2005 Four Continents Championships
- Next: 2007 Four Continents Championships

The 2006 Four Continents Figure Skating Championships was an international figure skating competition in the 2005–06 season. It was held at the World Arena in Colorado Springs, USA on January 25–28. Medals were awarded in the disciplines of men's singles, ladies' singles, pair skating, and ice dancing. The compulsory dance was the Tango Romantica.

== Medals table ==
Rank	Nation	Gold	Silver	Bronze	Total
1	United States (USA)	3	1	2	6
2	Japan (JPN)	1	1	0	2
3	Canada (CAN)	0	2	2	4
Totals (3 entries)		4	4	4	12

== Results ==
=== Men ===
Rank	Name	Nation	Total points	SP		FS	
1	Nobunari Oda	Japan	201.69	1	77.29	2	124.40
2	Christopher Mabee	Canada	198.69	3	68.13	1	130.56
3	Matthew Savoie	United States	190.15	2	75.64	6	114.51
4	Marc Andre Craig	Canada	186.12	4	65.62	4	120.50
5	Scott Smith	United States	185.25	6	61.84	3	123.41
6	Kensuke Nakaniwa	Japan	177.19	5	63.29	7	113.90
7	Yasuharu Nanri	Japan	172.82	10	57.40	5	115.42
8	Ma Xiaodong	China	172.11	8	59.86	9	112.25
9	Michael Weiss	United States	171.22	9	58.89	8	112.33
10	Wu Jialiang	China	164.64	7	60.76	11	103.88
11	Nicholas Young	Canada	162.30	11	53.58	10	108.72
12	Sean Carlow	Australia	136.68	12	48.70	12	87.98
13	Song Lun	China	127.69	13	47.37	13	80.32
14	Michael Novales	Philippines	118.94	14	44.46	14	74.48
15	Bradley Santer	Australia	112.62	15	42.62	15	70.00
16	Justin Pietersen	South Africa	105.38	16	38.58	17	66.80
17	Luis Hernandez	Mexico	102.28	19	34.12	16	68.16
18	Tristan Thode	New Zealand	101.91	17	36.06	18	65.85
19	Humberto Contreras	Mexico	98.81	18	35.59	19	63.22
20	Miguel Angel Moyron	Mexico	96.40	21	33.54	20	62.86
21	Joel Watson	New Zealand	91.64	22	31.24	22	60.40
22	Robert McNamara	Australia	91.61	23	30.10	21	61.51
23	Gareth Echardt	South Africa	87.83	20	33.60	23	54.23
24	Konrad Giering	South Africa	72.39	24	21.48	24	50.91

=== Ladies ===
Rank	Name	Nation	Total points	SP		FS	
1	Katy Taylor	United States	164.05	2	57.26	2	106.79
2	Yukari Nakano	Japan	161.49	3	53.53	1	107.96
3	Beatrisa Liang	United States	159.91	1	61.04	3	98.87
4	Lesley Hawker	Canada	145.94	6	48.91	4	97.03
5	Meagan Duhamel	Canada	145.28	5	50.98	6	94.30
6	Mai Asada	Japan	141.65	4	52.13	7	89.52
7	Liu Yan	China	138.55	10	43.78	5	94.77
8	Joanne Carter	Australia	133.97	8	47.19	9	86.78
9	Akiko Kitamura	Japan	132.04	11	43.56	8	88.48
10	Christine Zukowski	United States	131.42	9	46.43	10	84.99
11	Amélie Lacoste	Canada	127.29	7	47.96	11	79.33
12	Miriam Manzano	Australia	114.37	14	38.78	13	75.59
13	Choi Ji-eun	South Korea	112.42	17	34.09	12	78.33
14	Kim Chae-hwa	South Korea	112.00	12	42.37	14	69.63
15	Fang Dan	China	105.67	13	39.23	15	66.44
16	Michelle Cantu	Mexico	99.07	15	37.10	18	61.97
17	Shin Yea-ji	South Korea	92.36	16	36.96	19	55.40
18	Ana Cecilia Cantu	Mexico	92.22	20	29.33	16	62.89
19	Tammy Sutan	Thailand	90.80	21	28.72	17	62.08
20	Emily Naphtal	Mexico	82.55	18	30.74	21	51.81
21	Diane Chen	Chinese Taipei	80.61	22	27.16	20	53.45
22	Laura Downing	Australia	73.42	23	25.64	22	47.78
23	Megan Allely	South Africa	64.23	24	22.59	23	41.64
WD	Anastasia Gimazetdinova	Uzbekistan		19	29.92		
Free Skating Not Reached
25	Teresa Lin	Chinese Taipei		25	21.48		
26	Lauren Henry	South Africa		26	20.14		

=== Pairs ===
Rank	Name	Nation	Total points	SP		FS	
1	Rena Inoue / John Baldwin	United States	168.89	1	57.51	1	111.38
2	Utako Wakamatsu / Jean-Sébastien Fecteau	Canada	156.93	2	53.80	2	103.13
3	Elizabeth Putnam / Sean Wirtz	Canada	149.56	6	49.11	3	100.45
4	Marcy Hinzmann / Aaron Parchem	United States	148.90	3	51.04	4	97.86
5	Katie Orscher / Garrett Lucash	United States	145.90	5	49.77	5	96.13
6	Anabelle Langlois / Cody Hay	Canada	143.22	4	50.98	6	92.24
7	Li Jiaqi / Xu Jiankun	China	138.87	7	46.96	7	91.91
8	Marina Aganina / Artem Knyazev	Uzbekistan	123.60	8	45.41	8	78.19
9	Emma Brien / Stuart Beckingham	Australia	101.51	9	34.94	9	66.57

=== Ice dancing ===
Rank	Name	Nation	Total points	CD		OD		FD	
1	Tanith Belbin / Benjamin Agosto	United States	199.73	1	38.23	1	59.28	1	102.22
2	Morgan Matthews / Maxim Zavozin	United States	171.69	2	31.17	2	52.56	2	87.96
3	Tessa Virtue / Scott Moir	Canada	168.66	3	30.79	3	52.50	3	85.37
4	Chantal Lefebvre / Arseni Markov	Canada	161.97	4	30.66	4	48.94	4	82.37
5	Mylène Girard / Bradley Yaeger	Canada	152.29	6	27.30	5	45.55	5	79.44
6	Jamie Silverstein / Ryan O'Meara	United States	150.76	5	29.98	6	45.38	7	75.40
7	Yu Xiaoyang / Wang Chen	China	144.12	9	25.51	7	43.16	6	75.45
8	Nakako Tsuzuki / Kenji Miyamoto	Japan	139.08	7	25.78	9	42.25	8	71.05
9	Laura Munana / Luke Munana	Mexico	137.47	10	24.73	8	42.35	9	70.39
10	Huang Xintong / Zheng Xun	China	132.19	12	22.84	10	39.45	10	69.90
11	Olga Akimova / Alexander Shakalov	Uzbekistan	125.13	8	25.72	12	35.82	11	63.59
12	Natalie Buck / Trent Nelson-Bond	Australia	121.78	11	23.85	11	37.58	12	60.35
13	Alisa Allapach / Peter Kongkasem	Thailand	113.20	13	20.61	13	34.33	13	58.26
14	Maria Borounov / Evgeni Borounov	Australia	95.22	15	18.18	14	26.23	15	50.81
15	Kim Hye-min / Kim Min-woo	South Korea	93.93	14	20.54	15	22.54	14	50.85
