= Munana (surname) =

Munana is a surname. Notable people with the surname include:

- Laura Munana (born 1981), American ice dancer
- Luke Munana (born 1979), American ice dancer
