= Mexican Figure Skating Championships =

Recurring figure skating competition

- Status: Active
- Genre: National championships
- Frequency: Annual
- Country: Mexico
- Inaugurated: 1986
- Organizer: Mexican Federation of Figure Skating and Winter Sports

The Mexican Figure Skating Championships (Spanish: Campeonato Mexicano de Patinaje Artístico sobre Hielo) are an annual figure skating competition organized by the Mexican Federation of Figure Skating and Winter Sports (Spanish: Federación Mexicana de Patinaje Sobre Hielo y Deportes de Invierno) to crown the national champions of Mexico. Medals are awarded in men's singles, women's singles, and ice dance at the senior and junior levels, although each discipline may not necessarily be held every year due to a lack of participants. The first national championships were held in 1986 in Guadalajara.

== Senior medalists ==
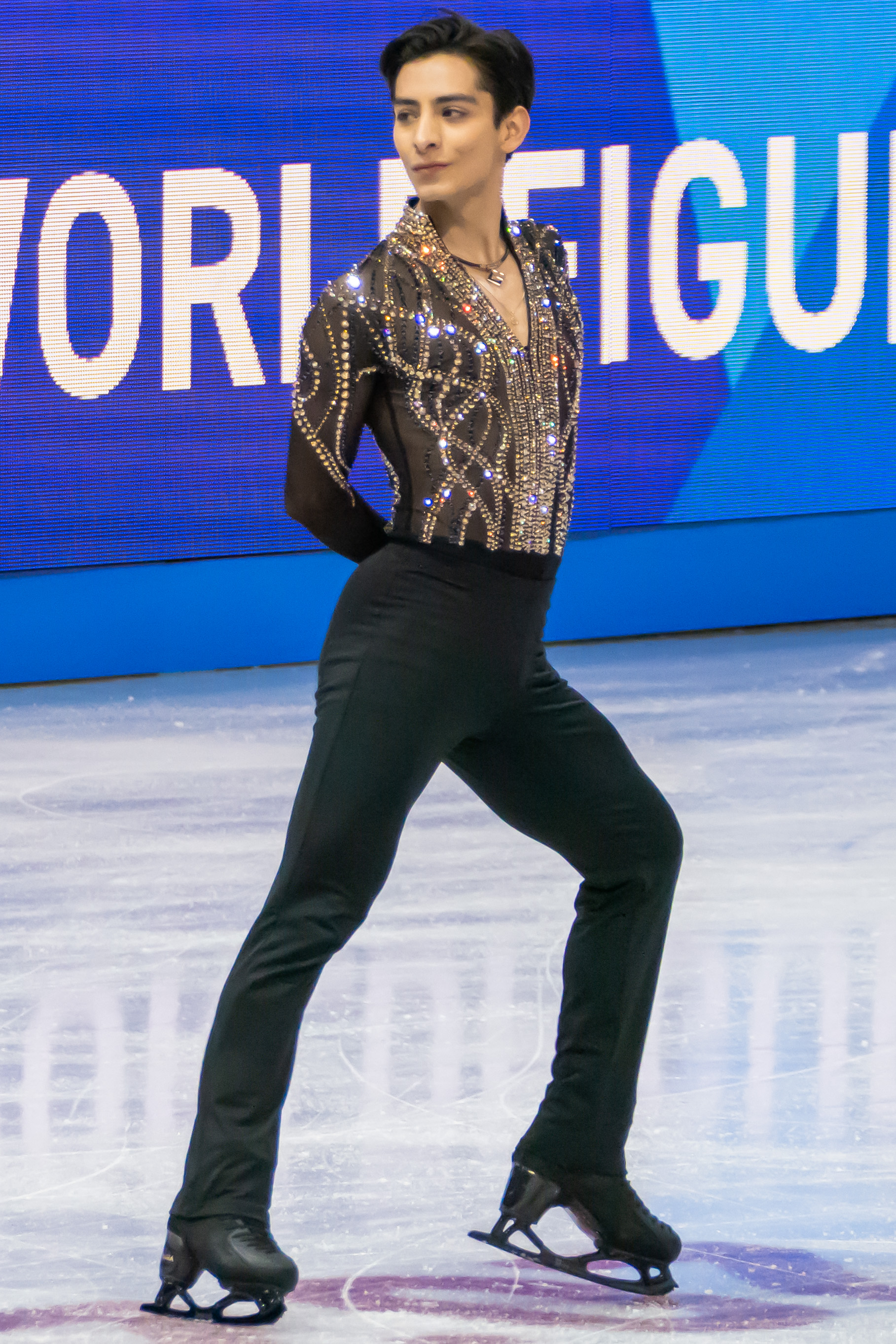
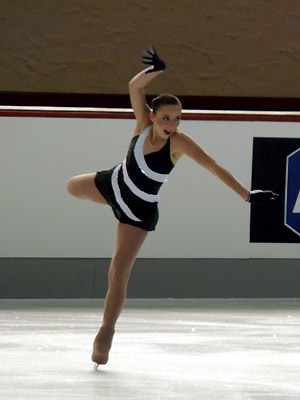
From left to right: Donovan Carrillo, eight-time Mexican champion in men's singles; and Ana Cecilia Cantú, four-time Mexican champion in women's singles

=== Men's singles ===
Men's event medalists
Season	Location	Gold	Silver	Bronze	Ref.
1986–87	Guadalajara				
1987–88	Guadalajara	Luis Hernández	Ricardo Olavarrieta	David Mercado	
1988–89					
1989–90					
1990–91					
1991–92					
1992–93					
1993–94					
1994–95					
1995–96					
1996–97					
1997–98	San Jerónimo	Ricardo Olavarrieta			
1998–99	León	David Del Pozo	Ricardo Olavarrieta		
1999–2000	Lomas Verdes	Ricardo Olavarrieta	David Del Pozo		
2000–01	Mexico City	Mauricio Medellin	David Del Pozo		
2001–02	Puebla	Mauricio Medellin	Michael Gilpin	No other competitors	
2002–03	Lomas Verdes	Humberto Contreras	No other competitors		
2003–04	Guadalajara	Humberto Contreras	Adrian Alvarado	Michael Gilpin	
2004–05	Lomas Verdes	Miguel Ángel Moyron	Humberto Contreras	Adrian Alvarado	
2005–06	Cuautitlán Izcalli	Humberto Contreras	Miguel Ángel Moyron	Luis Hernández	
2006–07	Monterrey	Miguel Ángel Moyron	Luis Hernández	Adrian Alvarado	
2007–08	Guadalajara	Luis Hernández	Humberto Contreras	Miguel Ángel Moyron	
2008–09	Cuautitlán Izcalli	Luis Hernández	Humberto Contreras	Adrian Alvarado	
2009–10	Metepec	Humberto Contreras	Luis Hernández	No other competitors	
2010–11	Cuautitlán Izcalli	Luis Hernández	Balam Labarrios	Fernando Hernández	
2011–12	Cuautitlán Izcalli	Luis Hernández	Fernando Hernandez	Balam Labarrios	
2012–13	Cuautitlán Izcalli	Luis Hernández	Balam Labarrios	Fabricio Carrillo	
2013–14	Cuautitlán Izcalli	Luis Hernández	Balam Labarrios	Fernando Hernandez	
2014–15	Mexico City	Balam Labarrios	Fabricio Carrillo	Adrian Alvarado	
2015–16		No men's competitors			
2016–17		No men's competitors			
2017–18		Donovan Carrillo	No other competitors		
2018–19		Donovan Carrillo	No other competitors		
2019–20		Donovan Carrillo	Rodrigo Carranza	No other competitors	
2020–21		Donovan Carrillo			
2021–22	Naucalpan	Donovan Carrillo	Diego Saldaña	Rodrigo Carranza	
2022–23	Naucalpan	Donovan Carrillo	No other competitors		
2023–24	Puebla	Donovan Carrillo	No other competitors		
2024–25	Metepec	Donovan Carrillo	No other competitors		
2025–26	Cancún	Donovan Carrillo	No other competitors		

=== Women's singles ===
Women's event medalists
Year	Location	Gold	Silver	Bronze	Ref.
1986–87	Guadalajara				
1987–88	Guadalajara	Diana Encinas	Diana Marcos	Mónica Glen	
1988–89					
1989–90					
1990–91					
1991–92					
1992–93					
1993–94					
1994–95					
1995–96					
1996–97					
1997–98	San Jerónimo	Tania Rojas	Elisa Caraza		
1998–99	León	Maria Fernanda Puente	Rocio Salas	Maricarmen Szeszko	
1999–2000	Lomas Verdes	Rocio Salas	Maricarmen Szeszko	Maria Fernanda Puente	
2000–01	Mexico City	Rocio Salas	Gladys Orozco	Ingrid Roth	
2001–02	Puebla	Gladys Orozco	Rocio Salas Visuet	Ingrid Roth	
2002–03	Lomas Verdes	Ana Cecilia Cantú	Gladys Orozco	Ingrid Roth	
2003–04	Guadalajara	Michele Cantú	Alicia Sanchez	Ana Cecilia Cantú	
2004–05	Lomas Verdes	Gladys Orozco	Michele Cantú	Ana Cecilia Cantú	
2005–06	Cuautitlán Izcalli	Michele Cantú	Emily Naphtal	Ana Cecilia Cantú	
2006–07	Monterrey				
2007–08	Guadalajara				
2008–09	Cuautitlán Izcalli	Ana Cecilia Cantú	Michele Cantú	No other competitors	
2009–10	Metepec	Ana Cecilia Cantú	Michele Cantú	Loretta Hamui	
2010–11	Cuautitlán Izcalli	Ana Cecilia Cantú	Mary Ro Reyes	No other competitors	
2011–12	Cuautitlán Izcalli	Mary Ro Reyes	Ana Cecilia Cantú	No other competitors	
2012–13	Cuautitlán Izcalli	Reyna Hamui	Ana Cecilia Cantú		
2013–14	Cuautitlán Izcalli	Reyna Hamui	Ana Cecilia Cantú		
2014–15	Mexico City	Reyna Hamui	Aislin Rosado	Maria del Rochio Reyes	
2015–16		Aislin Rosado	Priscila Alavez	Michelle Quintero	
2016–17					
2017–18		Sofia Del Rio	Isabella Canales	Regina Rodriguez	
2018–19		Sofia Del Rio	Isabella Canales	Regina Rodriguez	
2019–20		Andrea Montesinos Cantú	Regina Rodriguez	No other competitors	
2020–21					
2021–22	Naucalpan	Eugenia Garza	Andrea Montesinos Cantú	Ana Camila Gonzalez	
2022–23	Naucalpan	Andrea Astrain	Ximena Figueroa	Florencia Arpee	
2023–24	Puebla	Andrea Montesinos Cantú	Eugenia Garza	Andrea Astrain	
2024–25	Metepec	Andrea Astrain	Andrea Montesinos Cantú	Eugenia Garza	
2025–26	Cancún	Andrea Montesinos Cantú	Maria Toscano	Alejandra Gabriela Tirado	

=== Ice dance ===
Ice dance event medalists
Year	Location	Gold	Silver	Bronze	Ref.
2002–04	No ice dance competitors				
2004–05	Lomas Verdes	Laura Munana; Luke Munana	No other competitors		
2005–06	Cuautitlán Izcalli	Laura Munana; Luke Munana	No other competitors		
2006–07					
2007–08					
2008–09					
2009–10					
2010–11	Cuautitlán Izcalli	Corenne Bruhns; Benjamin Westenberger	No other competitors		
2011–12	Cuautitlán Izcalli	Corenne Bruhns; Ryan Van Natten	No other competitors		
2012–13					
2013–14					
2014–15					
2015–17	No ice dance competitors				
2017–18					
2018–19		No ice dance competitors			
2019–20					
2020–24	No ice dance competitors				
2024–25	Metepec	Ava Valentina Aversano; Christian Bennett	Harlow Lynella Stanley; Seiji Urano	No other competitors	
2025–26	Cancún	No ice dance competitors			

== Junior medalists ==
=== Men's singles ===
Junior men's event medalists
Year	Location	Gold	Silver	Bronze	Ref.
2021–22	Naucalpan	No junior men's competitors			
2022–23	Naucalpan				
2023–24	Puebla	No junior men's competitors			
2024–25	Metepec	Leonardo Emilio Mariscal	No other competitors		
2025–26	Cancún	No junior men's competitors			

=== Women's singles ===
Junior women's event medalists
Year	Location	Gold	Silver	Bronze	Ref.
2021–22	Naucalpan	Andrea Astrain	Natalie Acosta	Fatima Gomez	
2022–23	Naucalpan				
2023–24	Puebla	Regina García de León	Cayetana Gonzalez	Maria Velazquez	
2024–25	Metepec	Cayetana Gonzalez	Maria Velazquez	Regina Llado	
2025–26	Cancún	Camila Simone Arias	Stefania Soloveva (Argentina)	Victoria Hop	
