= Michael Novales =

Filipino figure skater

Personal information
- Full name: Michael Gregory Novales
- Born: April 13, 1985 (age 41) Makati, Philippines
- Home town: Laguna Hills, California, U.S.

Figure skating career
- Country: Philippines
- Coach: John Nicks, Russ Scott
- Skating club: Orange County FSC

Michael Novales (born April 13, 1985) is a Filipino figure skater. At the 2006 Four Continents Championships, where he placed 14th, he became the first skater to represent the Philippines in an International Skating Union (ISU) championship. Novales has been described as a star in his home country.

== Career ==
Novales competed at the U.S. Championships as a novice in 2002 and 2003, placing ninth and seventh, respectively.

Novales began representing the Philippines internationally in 2005. He placed 14th at the 2006 Four Continents Championships and 35th at the 2006 World Championships. He arrived in Changchun, China for the 2007 Asian Winter Games in sub-zero weather with a serious flu. He finished eighth despite chest congestion and coughing. Novales was coached by John Nicks and Russ Scott.

In 2005, Novales appeared alongside a large international cast in Spherical, a show choreographed by David Liu for the Grand Opening of the World Ice Arena in Shenzhen, China. In late 2008 and early 2009, he performed for Rand Productions in a three-month show at Ocean Park in Hong Kong. He also skated on board the cruise liners Freedom of the Seas and Mariner of the Seas.

Novales teaches at the rink where he trained, Aliso Viejo Ice Palace in Orange County.

== Personal life ==
Novales moved with his family from the Philippines to Laguna Hills, California, to pursue skating. He attended Saddleback College. His family includes his mother Edna, brother Vince, and sister Charlene.

== Results ==
International
Event	2005–06	2006–07
World Championships	35th	
Four Continents Championships	14th	
Asian Winter Games		8th
