= Andrea Montesinos Cantú =

Mexican figure skater (born 2002)

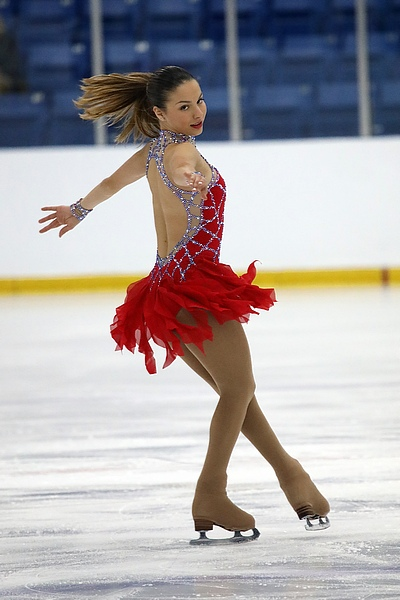
- Montesinos at the 2018 Autumn Classic

Personal information
- Born: October 4, 2002 (age 24) San Pedro Garza García, Mexico
- Height: 1.62 m (5 ft 4 in)

Figure skating career
- Country: Mexico
- Coach: Jonathan Mills; Myke Gillman
- Skating club: ADIENL Monterrey
- Began skating: 2007

Medal record
Mexican Championships
Gold medal – first place	2024 Puebla	Singles
Gold medal – first place	2026 Cancun	Singles

Andrea Montesinos Cantú (born October 4, 2002) is a Mexican figure skater. She is the 2023 NRW Trophy champion, 2025 Santa Claus Cup champion, and a three-time Mexican national champion (2019, 2023, 2026).

== Career ==
=== Early years ===
Montesinos Cantú began learning to skate as a five-year-old in Mexico before relocating to the United States. Competing in the advanced novice category, she won silver at the 2014 Santa Claus Cup in Hungary.

=== 2016–2017 season: Junior international debut ===
In September, making her junior international debut, Montesinos Cantú placed 9th at the ISU Junior Grand Prix (JGP) in Yokohama, Japan. In March, she qualified to the final segment at the 2017 World Junior Championships in Taipei, Taiwan. She ranked twenty-fourth in the short program, seventeenth in the free skate, and nineteenth overall. She was coached by Vladimir Petrenko in Simsbury, Connecticut.

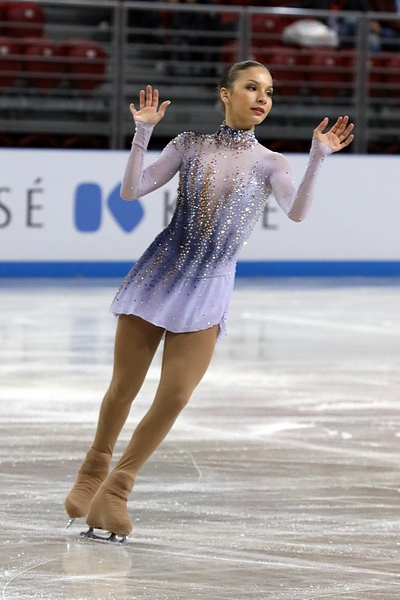
Montesinos Cantú at the 2018 World Junior Championships

=== 2017–2018 season: Mexican junior champion ===
Montesinos Cantú began training in Lakewood, California, coached by Rafael Arutyunyan, Vera Arutyunyan, and Nadia Kanaeva. Competing in her second JGP series, she placed twelfth in Brisbane, Australia, and fourteenth in Zagreb, Croatia. Ranked twenty-seventh in the short program, she did not reach the free skate at the 2018 World Junior Championships in Sofia, Bulgaria.

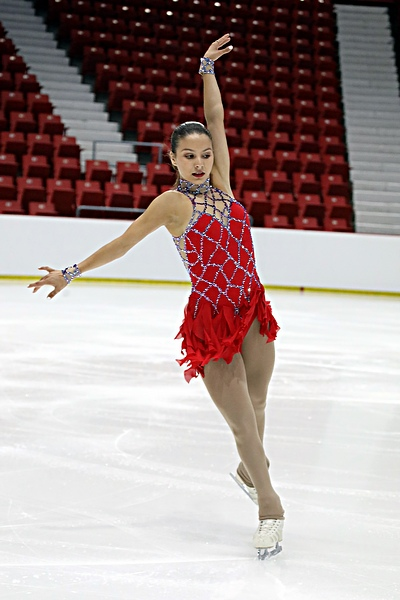
Montesinos Cantú at the 2019 JGP in Lake Placid

=== 2018–2019 season: Senior international debut ===
Montesinos Cantú made her senior debut in August 2018, placing seventh at the Philadelphia Summer International. Competing in the ISU Challenger Series, she finished eleventh at the 2018 CS U.S. Classic, eleventh at the 2018 CS Autumn Classic International, and fifteenth at the 2018 CS Golden Spin of Zagreb. She also appeared at a pair of JGP events, placing sixteenth in Bratislava, Slovakia, and seventeenth in Yerevan, Armenia.

In February, Montesinos Cantú finished twentieth at the 2019 Four Continents Championships in Anaheim, California. A month later, she competed at the 2019 World Junior Championships in Zagreb, Croatia, but she did not advance to the free skate after placing forty-third in the short.

=== 2019–2020 season: First Mexican national title ===
Montesinos Cantú opened her season at the second event of the ISU Junior Grand Prix in Lake Placid, New York, where she set a new personal best of 50.59 in the short program. She finished seventeenth. Competing on the Challenger series, she was tenth at the 2019 CS Autumn Classic International with personal bests in all three scores, then fifth at the 2019 CS U.S. Classic, and finally twentieth at the 2019 CS Golden Spin of Zagreb.

In the second half of the season, Montesinos Cantú was sixteenth at the 2020 Four Continents Championships and thirty-eighth at the 2020 World Junior Championships.

=== 2020–2021 season ===
With the COVID-19 pandemic limiting international competition, Montesinos Cantú's lone appearance of the season saw her finish seventeenth at the International Challenge Cup.

=== 2021–2022 season ===
Montesinos Cantú began the season by finishing twenty-first at the 2021 Cranberry Cup. She then went on to place fifteenth at the 2021 CS Golden Spin of Zagreb and ended the season with an eighteenth-place finish at the 2022 Four Continents Championships.

=== 2022–2023 season ===
Montesinos Cantú's lone competition appearance for the season was at the 2022 CS U.S. International Figure Skating Classic, where she finished thirteenth.

=== 2023–2024 season: First international medal ===
Prior to the season, it was announced that Montesinos Cantú was now training in Salt Lake City, Utah and being coached by Jozef Sabovcik. Montesinos Cantú's first competition of the season was the 2023 Denkova-Staviski Cup, where she placed tenth. She went on to take gold at the 2023 NRW Trophy.

At the 2024 Mexican Championships, Montesinos Cantú secured her second senior national title. Selected to compete at the 2024 Four Continents Championships, Montesinos Cantú finished fifteenth.

=== 2024–2025 season ===
In August, Montesinos Cantú had surgery performed on her ankle, which required time to recover. She returned to competition at the 2025 Winter World University Games in January, where she finished in twenty-fifth place. She subsequently finished the season by placing fourteenth at the 2025 Bavarian Open.

=== 2025–2026 season ===
Montesinos Cantú started the season in August by competing at the 2025 CS Cranberry Cup International, where she finished in eighth place.

In January, she finished in 20th place at the 2026 Four Continents.

=== 2026–2027 season ===
Montesinos Cantú opened her season, placing 11th at the 2026 Kinoshita Group Cup.

== Programs ==
Season	Short program	Free skating
2026–2027	Histoire d'un Amour by Helene Segara, Mathieu Lecat, Jean-François Berger	The Mission: Gabriel's Oboe by Ennio Morricone, Yo-Yo Ma, Roma Sinfonietta; Gabriel's Oboe (Whispers in a Dream) by Hayley Westenra, Ennio Morricone, Roma Sinfonietta
2025–2026	Yellow Moon by Luca D'Alberto; Andrei by Martin Phipps choreo. by Benoit Richaud	The Storm by Balázs Havasi choreo. by David Wilson
2024–2025	Stay by Rihanna & Mikky Ekko; Diamonds by Rihanna choreo. by Benoit Richaud	Tris (from Divergent) by Junkie XL & Ellie Goulding choreo. by Mark Pillay
2023–2024	Yellow Moon by Luca D'Alberto; Andrei by Martin Phipps choreo. by Benoit Richaud	The Storm by Balázs Havasi choreo. by David Wilson
2022–2023	Yellow Moon by Luca D'Alberto; Andrei by Martin Phipps choreo. by Benoit Richaud	Everybody Wants to Rule the World (from The Hunger Games: Catching Fire) performed by Lorde choreo. by Shae-Lynn Bourne
2021–2022	Jennifer Lopez medley choreo. by Adam Rippon	Everybody Wants to Rule the World (from The Hunger Games: Catching Fire) performed by Lorde choreo. by Shae-Lynn Bourne
2020–2021	Jennifer Lopez medley choreo. by Adam Rippon	Everybody Wants to Rule the World (from The Hunger Games: Catching Fire) performed by Lorde choreo. by Shae-Lynn Bourne
2019–2020	Swing da Cor by Daniela Mercury choreo. by Nadia Kanaeva	Jeux d'Eau (from O) choreo. by Cynthia Stuart
2018–2019	Swing da Cor by Daniela Mercury choreo. by Nadia Kanaeva	Jeux d'Eau (from O) choreo. by Cynthia Stuart
2017–2018	Experience by Ludovico Einaudi choreo. by Nikolai Morozov	Adiós Nonino by Astor Piazzolla choreo. by Nikolai Morozov
2016–2017	La califfa by Ennio Morricone choreo. by Nikolai Morozov	Adiós Nonino by Astor Piazzolla choreo. by Nikolai Morozov

== Competitive highlights ==
- JGP – Event of the ISU Junior Grand Prix Series
- CS – Event of the ISU Challenger Series
- TBD – Assigned
- WD – Withdrew from competition
- C – Cancelled

Competition placements at senior level
Season	2018–19	2019–20	2020–21	2021–22	2022–23	2023–24	2024–25	2025–26	2026–27
Four Continents Championships	20th	16th		18th		15th		20th	
Mexican Championships		1st		2nd		1st	2nd	1st	
CS Autumn Classic	11th	10th							
CS Cranberry Cup				21st				8th	
CS Cup of Tyrol			C						
CS Golden Spin	15th	20th		15th					
CS Kinoshita Group Cup									11th
CS Trialeti Trophy								20th	
CS U.S. Classic	11th	5th			13th				
Bavarian Open							14th		
Denkova-Staviski Cup						11th			
International Challenge Cup			17th						
NRW Trophy						1st			
Philadelphia Summer	7th								
Santa Claus Cup								1st	
Skate to Milano								11th	
Tayside Trophy					WD				
Winter World University Games							25th		

Competition placements at junior level
Season	2016–17	2017–18	2018–19	2019–20
World Junior Championships	19th	27th	43rd	38th
Mexican Championships		1st	1st	
JGP Armenia			17th	
JGP Australia		12th		
JGP Croatia		14th		
JGP Japan	9th			
JGP Slovakia			16th	
JGP United States				17th
Autumn Classic	8th			

== Detailed results ==
ISU personal best scores in the +5/-5 GOE System
Segment	Type	Score	Event
Total	**TSS**	**148.55**	2019 CS Autumn Classic International
Short program	**TSS**	**53.59**	2025 ISU Skate to Milano
Short program	TES	27.87	2019 CS Autumn Classic International
Short program	PCS	26.23	2024 Four Continents Championships
Free skating	**TSS**	**96.03**	2025 CS Cranberry Cup International
Free skating	TES	48.13	2018 CS U.S. International Figure Skating Classic
Free skating	PCS	52.34	2025 CS Cranberry Cup International

Small medals for short and free programs awarded only at ISU Championships.

ISU Personal best in bold.

=== Senior results ===
Results in the 2018-19 season
Date	Event	SP		FS		Total	
Date	Event	P	Score	P	Score	P	Score
Aug 3-5, 2018	(United States) 2018 CS U.S. International Figure Skating Classic	12	45.61	8	93.21	11	138.82
Sep 12-16, 2018	(United States) 2018 Philadelphia Summer International	8	35.94	6	74.58	7	110.52
Sep 20-22, 2018	(Canada) 2018 CS Autumn Classic International	15	43.25	10	84.90	11	128.15
Dec 5-8, 2018	(Croatia) 2018 CS Golden Spin of Zagreb	19	45.39	17	88.91	15	134.30
Feb 7-10, 2019	(United States) 2019 Four Continents Championships	22	42.92	20	81.59	20	124.51

Results in the 2019-20 season
Date	Event	SP		FS		Total	
Date	Event	P	Score	P	Score	P	Score
Sep 12-14, 2019	(Canada) 2019 CS Autumn Classic International	8	52.59	12	95.96	10	**148.55**
Sep 19-21 2019	(United States) 2019 CS U.S. International Figure Skating Classic	8	49.54	5	91.05	5	140.59
Dec 4-7, 2019	(Croatia) 2019 CS Golden Spin of Zagreb	22	40.96	17	86.49	20	127.45
Feb 4-9, 2020	(South Korea) 2020 Four Continents Championships	15	47.40	18	87.84	16	135.24

Results in the 2020-21 season
Date	Event	SP		FS		Total	
Date	Event	P	Score	P	Score	P	Score
Feb 25-28, 2021	(Netherlands) 2021 International Challenge Cup	13	49.29	17	71.41	17	120.70

Results in the 2021-22 season
Date	Event	SP		FS		Total	
Date	Event	P	Score	P	Score	P	Score
Aug 11-15, 2021	(United States) 2021 Cranberry Cup International	24	34.53	21	71.97	21	106.50
Dec 7-11, 2021	(Croatia) 2021 CS Golden Spin of Zagreb	19	42.78	15	89.07	15	131.85
Jan 18–23, 2022	(Estonia) 2022 Four Continents Championships	19	47.36	18	85.67	18	133.03

Results in the 2022-23 season
Date	Event	SP		FS		Total	
Date	Event	P	Score	P	Score	P	Score
Sep 12-16, 2022	(United States) 2022 CS U.S. Classic	12	39.86	13	63.43	13	103.29

Results in the 2023-24 season
Date	Event	SP		FS		Total	
Date	Event	P	Score	P	Score	P	Score
Nov 7-12, 2023	(Bulgaria) 2023 Denkova-Staviski Cup	13	41.16	9	89.66	11	131.12
Nov 16-19, 2023	(Germany) 2023 NRW Trophy	1	51.23	4	84.96	1	136.19
Nov 27 – Dec 3 2023	(Mexico) 2024 Mexican Championships	2	47.60	1	97.07	1	144.67
Jan 30 – Feb 4, 2024	(China) 2024 Four Continents Championships	16	50.86	16	92.38	15	143.24

Results in the 2024-25 season
Date	Event	SP		FS		Total	
Date	Event	P	Score	P	Score	P	Score
Jan 16–18, 2025	(Italy) 2025 Winter World University Games	25	38.07	—N/a	—N/a	25	38.07
Jan 20–26, 2025	(Germany) 2025 Bavarian Open	17	35.15	14	78.76	14	13.91

Results in the 2025–26 season
Date	Event	SP		FS		Total	
Date	Event	P	Score	P	Score	P	Score
Aug 7–10, 2025	(United States) 2025 CS Cranberry Cup International	7	50.93	8	**96.03**	8	146.96
Sep 18-21, 2025	(China) 2025 ISU Skate to Milano	10	**53.59**	12	94.51	11	148.10
Oct 8–11, 2025	(Georgia (country)) 2025 CS Trialeti Trophy	20	44.54	20	87.04	20	131.58
Nov 26-30, 2025	(Hungary) 2025 Santa Claus Cup	4	55.08	1	103.18	1	158.26
Jan 21-25, 2026	(China) 2026 Four Continents Championships	19	48.13	21	79.84	20	127.97
May 18–24, 2026	(Mexico) 2026 Mexican Championships	1	45.39	1	87.17	1	132.56

Results in the 2026-27 season
Date	Event	SP		FS		Total	
Date	Event	P	Score	P	Score	P	Score
Sep 4-6, 2026	(Japan) 2026 CS Kinoshita Group Cup	11	51.24	11	91.99	11	143.23

=== Junior results ===
**2019–2020 season**
Date	Event	SP	FS	Total
March 2–8, 2020	2020 World Junior Championships	38; 42.04	-	38; 42.04
August 28–31, 2019	2019 JGP United States	14; 50.59	20; 68.60	17; 119.19
**2018–2019 season**
Date	Event	SP	FS	Total
March 4–10, 2019	2019 World Junior Championships	43; 35.15	-	43; 35.15
October 10–13, 2018	2018 JGP Armenia	17; 39.31	18; 64.79	17; 104.10
August 22–25, 2018	2018 JGP SLovakia	20; 40.41	14; 82.87	16; 123.28
**2017–2018 season**
Date	Event	SP	FS	Total
March 5–11, 2018	2018 World Junior Championships	27; 44.26	-	27; 44.26
September 27–30, 2017	2017 JGP Croatia	18; 38.18	13; 82.12	14; 120.30
August 23–26, 2017	2017 JGP Australia	15; 37.66	12; 77.13	12; 114.79
**2016–2017 season**
Date	Event	SP	FS	Total
March 13–19, 2017	2017 World Junior Championships	24; 44.66	17; 83.89	19; 128.55
Sept. 29 – Oct. 1, 2016	2016 Autumn Classic Junior	8; 36.50	8; 66.85	8; 103.35
September 8–11, 2016	2016 JGP Japan	9; 45.36	9; 80.25	9; 125.61
