= Rosemary Beresford =

American figure skater (born 1890)

Personal information
- Full name: Rosemary Beresford

Figure skating career
- Country: United States
- Skating club: New York SC

Rosemary Beresford (July 1890-December 14, 1971) was an American figure skater. In 1918, she won the U.S. Figure Skating Championships.

== Competitive highlights ==
Event	1918
U.S. Championships	1st
