= Humberto Contreras =

Mexican figure skater (born 1983)

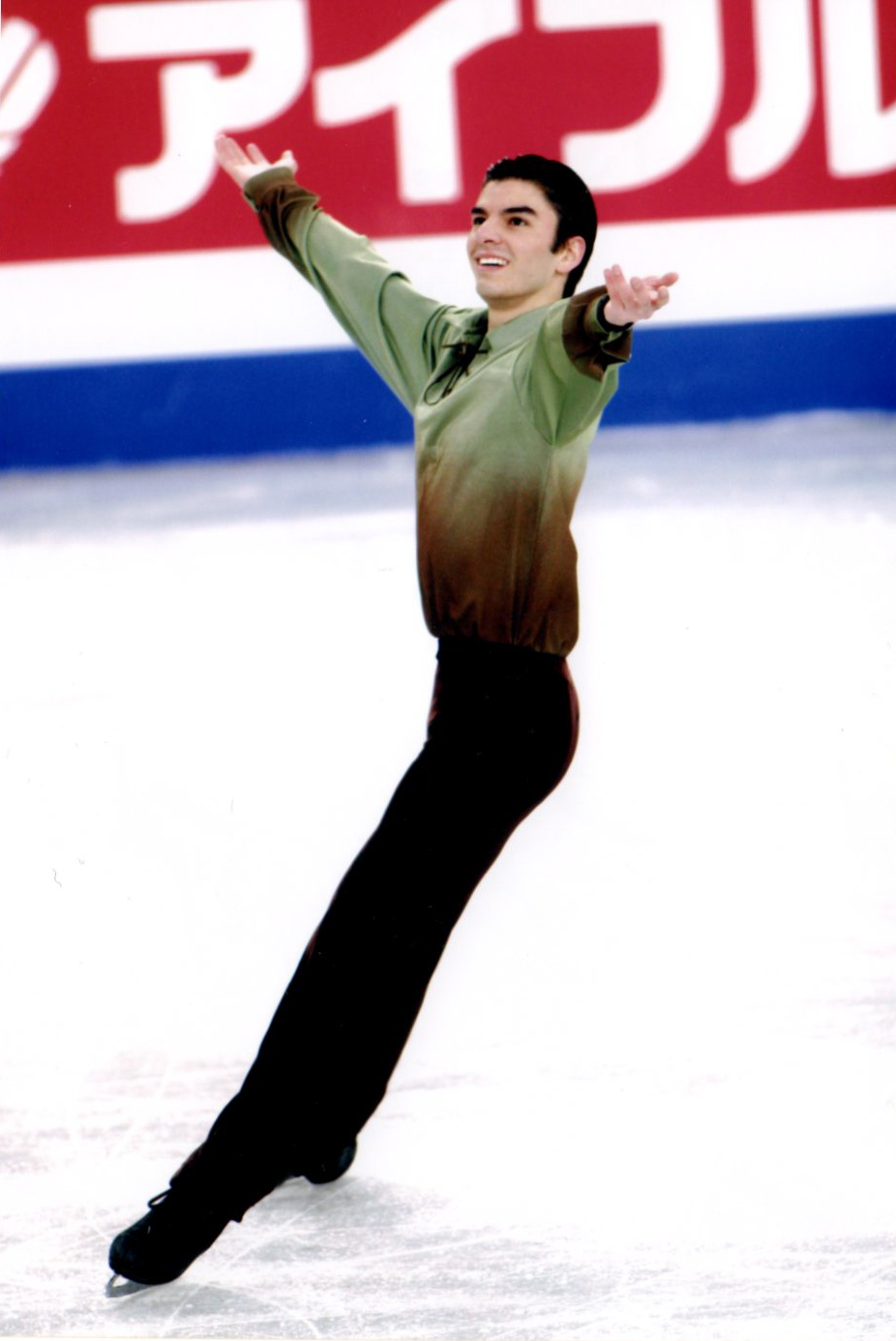

Personal information
- Born: August 21, 1983 (age 43) Mexico City, Mexico
- Height: 1.76 m (5 ft 9 1/2 in)

Figure skating career
- Country: Mexico
- Coach: Elvis Stojko; Rocio Salas; Julie Graham; Wendy Boyland; Alesandro Chavez; Alexei Muratov; Darin Carlton
- Skating club: Asociacion Jalisco
- Began skating: 1997
- Retired: November 2010

Humberto Contreras (born August 21, 1983) is a Mexican figure skater. He is a four-time Mexican national champion ('02, '03, '05, '09) and competed in the final segment at six Four Continents Championships.

== Career ==
Contreras began learning to skate in 1997. Early in his career, he was coached by Darin Carlton, Alexei Muratov (2001–02), Alesandro Chavez (2002–03), and Wendy Boyland (2003–04) in Mexico City. At the 2004 Four Continents Championships, he became the first Mexican skater to perform a triple Salchow triple Loop combination in competition.

In May 2004, Contreras began training under Julie Graham and Rocio Salas in Marlborough, Massachusetts. By the 2008–09 season, his coach was Elvis Stojko in Guadalajara, Jalisco.

Contreras retired from competition in 2010.

== Programs ==
Season	Short program	Free skating
2008–2010	El Conquistador by Maxime Rodriguez	West Side Story by Leonard Bernstein
2005–2008	Rockin' Gypsies by Willie & Lobo; Salomé by Chayanne	Robin Hood: Prince of Thieves by Michael Kamen
2004–2005	Fiesta Flamenca by Salvador Bacarisse	Robin Hood: Prince of Thieves by Michael Kamen
2003–2004	Fiesta Flamenca by Salvador Bacarisse	Guadalajara; Allá en el Rancho Grande; Las Bicicletas; Estrellita, Huapango
2002–2003	Henry V by Patrick Doyle; The Battle of Agincourt	Armageddon by Trevor Rabin; Long Distance Goodbye; Armageddon Piano
2001–2002	Down with the Underground by Trevor Reilly	Violin Fantasy Nessun Dorma (from Turandot) by Giacomo Puccini performed by Vanessa-Mae

== Results ==
International
Event	98–99	99–00	00–01	01–02	02–03	03–04	04–05	05–06	06–07	07–08	08–09	09–10
Worlds							43rd					44th
Four Continents						21st	19th	18th	19th	21st	23rd	23rd
International: Junior
JGP France			15th									
JGP Mexico	12th		14th									
JGP Netherlands		19th		23rd								
JGP Sweden				18th								
JGP United States					15th							
National
Mexican Champ.	2nd J	2nd J	2nd J	2nd J	1st	1st	2nd	1st		2nd	2nd	1st
J = Junior level; JGP = Junior Grand Prix
