= Miguel Ángel Moyron =

Mexican figure skater (born 1987)

Miguel Angel Moyron
Personal information
- Full name: Miguel Angel Moyron
- Born: September 6, 1987 (age 39) Guadalajara
- Height: 170 cm (5.6 ft)

Figure skating career
- Country: Mexico
- Coach: Alejandro Chavez
- Skating club: Asociacion Jailisco

Miguel Angel Moyron (born September 6, 1987, in Guadalajara) is a Mexican figure skater. He is the 2002 and 2005 Mexican national champion.

== Programs ==
Season	Short Program	Free Skating
2005–2006	Concierto de Aranjuez by Joaquín Rodrigo	Prince of Egypt by Hans Zimmer

== Competitive highlights ==
Competition	2002–2003	2003–2004	2004–2005	2005–2006	2006–2007	2007–2008
World Championships		40th				
Four Continents Championships		18th	20th	20th		
World Junior Championships	43rd	41st	17th QR			
Mexican Championships		1st J	1st	2nd	1st	3rd
Karl Schäfer Memorial				17th		
Junior Grand Prix, Taiwan					12th	
Junior Grand Prix, Mexico		10th			13th	
Junior Grand Prix, Canada				12th		
Junior Grand Prix, Romania			20th			
Junior Grand Prix, Slovenia		18th				
Junior Grand Prix, Germany	21st					
Junior Grand Prix, Slovakia	21st					

- QR = Qualifying Round
