= Reyna Hamui =

Mexican figure skater (born 1993)

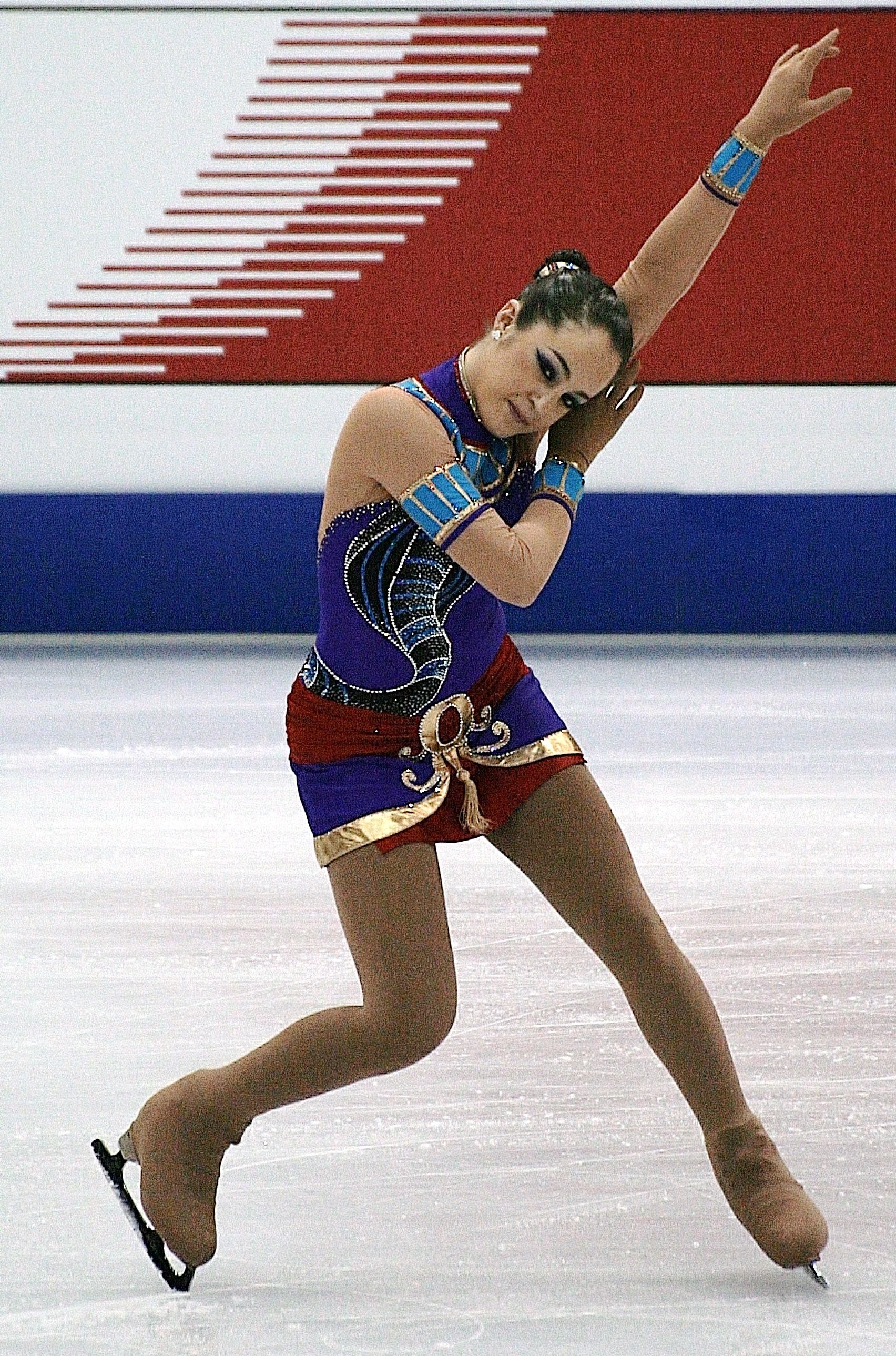
- Hamui in 2012

Personal information
- Born: December 28, 1993 (age 32) Mexico City, Mexico
- Height: 1.56 m (5 ft 1 1/2 in)

Figure skating career
- Country: Mexico
- Coach: Jason Dungjen, Yuka Sato
- Skating club: Asociacion del Estado de Mexico
- Began skating: 1998

Reyna Hamui (born December 28, 1993) is a Mexican figure skater. She is the 2012 Mexican national champion.

When Hamui was ten years old, she and her family moved from Mexico to Florida, where they lived for six years before moving to Delaware for better training conditions. In August 2012, she moved to Detroit where she is coached by Jason Dungjen and Yuka Sato.

== Programs ==
Season	Short program	Free skating
2013–2014	Another Cha Cha by Santa Esmeralda	Madagascar 3 by Hans Zimmer
2012–2013	Carol Ann by Michael W. Smith	Madagascar 3 by Hans Zimmer
2011–2012	Lord of the Dance by Ronan Hardiman	The Prince of Egypt by Hans Zimmer
2010–2011	The Mask of Zorro by James Horner	The Prince of Egypt by Hans Zimmer
2009–2010	Por una cabeza by Carlos Gardel	Cinema Paradiso by Ennio Morricone
2008–2009	Curdiel by J. Gonzalez	Winter (from Four Seasons) by Antonio Vivaldi

== Competitive highlights ==
International
Event	2007–08	2008–09	2009–10	2010–11	2011–12	2012–13	2013–14	2014–15
Worlds					32nd			
Four Continents				28th	25th	13th	19th	
Crystal Skate						4th		
Cup of Nice						16th		
Gardena					5th			
Merano Cup					10th			
Nebelhorn				11th		14th	16th	
NRW Trophy					24th			
Ondrej Nepela						15th		
Sarajevo Open							2nd	
Triglav Trophy					14th			
Universiade							15th	
International: Junior
Junior Worlds		42nd		24th PR				
JGP Australia								
JGP Austria								
JGP USA								
Cup of Nice	21st J.			17th J.				
Merano Cup		14th J.						
Triglav Trophy			17th J.					
National
Mexican		1st J.	2nd J.	1st J.	1st	1st		1st
J. = Junior level; JGP = Junior Grand Prix; PR = Preliminary round
