= Mary Ro Reyes =

Mexican figure skater (born 1992)

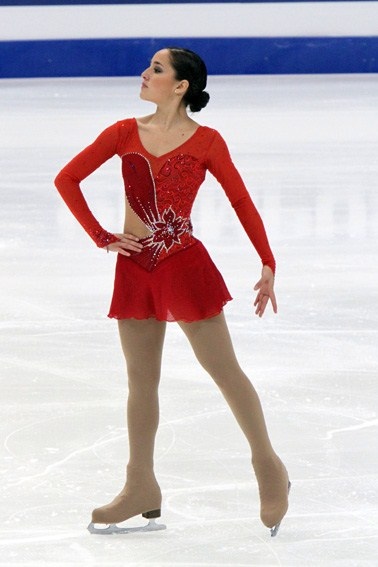
- María del Rocío Reyes (2011)

Personal information
- Full name: María del Rocío Reyes
- Born: January 4, 1992 (age 34) Puebla
- Home town: Puebla
- Height: 1.62 m (5 ft 4 in)

Figure skating career
- Country: Mexico
- Coach: Michael Hopfes, Dmitri Zaitsev
- Skating club: Asociacion de Deportes Invernales de Puebla
- Began skating: 1998

Mary Ro Reyes (born January 4, 1992, in Puebla) is a Mexican figure skater.

== Results ==
Event	2007–08	2008–09	2009–10	2010–11	2011–12	2012–13	2014–15
World Championships				41st			
Universiade						22nd	30th
Four Continents Championships			26th	29th			
World Junior Championships	40th						
Mexican Championships	1st J.	4th	2nd	1st			3rd
Coupe Internationale de Nice				21st		29th	
Ondrej Nepela Memorial						20th	
ISU Junior Grand Prix, Germany			29th	22nd			
ISU Junior Grand Prix, Mexico		23rd					
ISU Junior Grand Prix, Croatia	18th						
