= Luis Hernández (figure skater) =

Mexican figure skater (born 1984)

Luis Hernandez
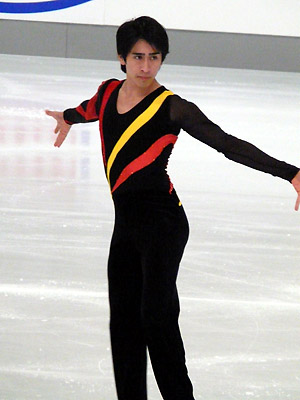
- Hernández in 2007.

Personal information
- Full name: Luis Hernández Olea
- Born: March 11, 1984 (age 42) Guadalajara
- Height: 1.72 m (5 ft 8 in)

Figure skating career
- Country: Mexico
- Coach: Éric Millot; Richard O Neill; Ken Congemi
- Skating club: Asociacion del Estado Mexico

Luis Hernandez Olea (born March 11, 1984, in Guadalajara, Mexico) is a Mexican former competitive figure skater. He was a 6-time Mexican National champion. Representing Mexico at 4 World Championships. In 2008, he placed 15th at the Four Continents Championships. This is the highest finish ever by a male skater from Mexico in the Four Continents Championships. He previously competed at the United States Figure Skating Championships, placing 7th as a novice in 2002 and 11th in 2003. He was formerly coached by Frank Carroll.

== Competitive highlights ==
Event	2002–03	2005–06	2006–07	2007–08	2008–09	2009–10	2010–11	2011–12	2012–13	2013–14
World Championships		19th QR	36th	36th	34th					
Four Continents Championships		17th	17th	15th	17th					
Mexican Championships		3rd	2nd	1st	1st	2nd	1st	1st	1st	1st
U.S. Championships	11th J.									
Nebelhorn Trophy				19th	WD	30th				
NRW Trophy									15th	
Finlandia Trophy					WD					
Ondrej Nepela Memorial				18th						
Golden Spin of Zagreb			18th				12th			
Merano Cup		5th								

- WD = Withdrew; QR = Qualifying Round
