= Ricardo Olavarrieta =

Mexican figure skater (born 1970)

Riccardo Olavarrieta
Personal information
- Full name: Walberto Ricardo Olavarrieta Navarro
- Nationality: Mexican
- Born: 12 April 1970 (age 56)

Sport
- Sport: Figure skating

Walberto Ricardo Olavarrieta Navarro (born 12 April 1970) is a Mexican figure skater. He competed at the 1988 Winter Olympics and the 1992 Winter Olympics.

Today. Olavarrieta is a coach, commentator, holds a Master's degree in International Business and a Bachelor's degree in International Affairs and was a technical specialist for the International Skating Union (ISU) at the PyeongChang 2018 Games.
