= Michele Cantú =

Mexican figure skater (born 1988)

Michele Cantu
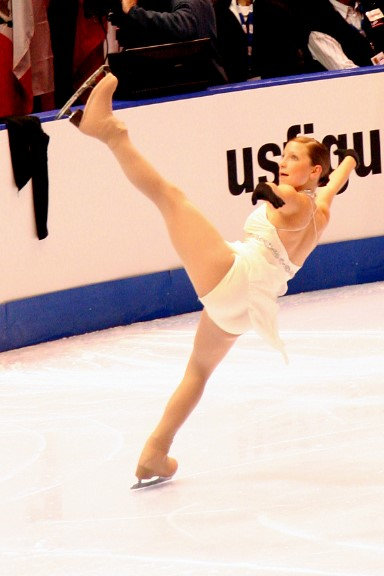
- Cantu in 2006.

Personal information
- Born: June 24, 1988 (age 38) Monterrey, Mexico
- Height: 1.59 m (5 ft 2 1/2 in)

Figure skating career
- Country: Mexico
- Coach: Richard O'Neill
- Skating club: Asociacion de Nuevo Leon

Michele Cantu (born June 24, 1988) is a Mexican figure skater. She is the 2006 Mexican national champion and qualified to the free skate at five Four Continents Championships. She also competed at one Grand Prix event, the 2006 Skate America. She has three siblings – Mexican international figure skater Ana Cecilia Cantu, Paulina Cantu, and Homero Cantu.

== Programs ==
Season	Short program	Free skating
2008–2009	Lo Que Vendra by Astor Piazzolla	Cinema Paradiso by Ennio Morricone
2005–2007	Satin Doll by Duke Ellington	My Fair Lady by Frederick Loewe; I Could Have Danced All Night; I've Grown Accustomed to Her Face
2004–2005	Space Capades medley	Huapango by José Pablo Moncayo, Universidad Nacional Autonoma de Mexico
2003–2004	42nd Street by Harry Warren	Don Quixote by Ludwig Minkus

== Competitive highlights ==
GP: Grand Prix; JGP: Junior Grand Prix

International
Event	02–03	03–04	04–05	05–06	06–07	07–08	08–09
Worlds		26th	18th P	27th			
Four Continents		15th	16th	16th	22nd		21st
GP Skate America					10th		
Finlandia Trophy						16th	
Schäfer Memorial			10th	20th	WD		
International: Junior or novice
JGP Estonia				25th			
JGP Croatia		17th					
JGP Mexico		9th					
Triglav Trophy	9th N						
National
Mexican Champ.	1st J	1st	2nd	1st	1st	2nd	2nd
Levels: N = Novice; J = Junior; P = Qualifying round; WD = Withdrew
