= Laura Munana =

American-born ice dancer (born 1981)

Personal information
- Born: July 24, 1981 (age 44) San Jose, California, U.S.
- Height: 5 ft 2 in (1.57 m)

Figure skating career
- Country: Mexico
- Partner: Luke Munana
- Skating club: Asociacion Estado de Mexico
- Retired: 2007

Laura Munana (born July 24, 1981, in San Jose, California) is an American-born former ice dancer who represented Mexico in international competition with her brother Luke Munana. The two competed for the United States until 2004. After that, they competed at the Four Continents Championships and the World Figure Skating Championships for Mexico, as well as competing on the Grand Prix circuit. The Munanas were the first ice dancers to compete internationally for Mexico. They retired from skating after the 2006–2007 season.

== Results ==
Ice Dance (with Munana)

Event	1997-98	1998-99	1999-00	2000-01	2001-02	2002-03	2003-04	2004-05	2005-06	2006-07
World Championships								25th	26th	29th
Four Continents Championships								9th	9th	11th
Mexican Championships								1st		
U.S. Championships	7th N.			10th J.	12th		10th			
Skate America									11th	
Karl Schäfer Memorial									10th	
Nebelhorn Trophy									11th	

(with Paul Goldner)

Event	2000
U.S. Championships	9th N.
