= Luke Munana =

American ice dancer (born 1979)

Personal information
- Born: January 10, 1979 (age 47) San Jose, California, United States

Figure skating career
- Country: Mexico
- Skating club: Asociacion Estado de Mexico

Luke Munana (born January 10, 1979) is an American-born former competitive ice dancer who represented Mexico in international competition with his sister Laura Munana. The two competed for the United States until 2004. After that, they competed at the Four Continents Championships and the World Figure Skating Championships for Mexico, as well as competing on the Grand Prix circuit. The Munanas were the first ice dancers to compete internationally for Mexico. They retired from skating after the 2006–2007 season.

== Results ==
Ice dance (with Munana)

Event	1997-98	1998-99	1999-00	2000-01	2001-02	2002-03	2003-04	2004-05	2005-06	2006-07
World Championships								25th	26th	29th
Four Continents Championships								9th	9th	11th
Mexican Championships								1st		
U.S. Championships	7th N.			10th J.	12th		10th			
Skate America									11th	
Karl Schäfer Memorial									10th	
Nebelhorn Trophy									11th	
