= Ana Cecilia Cantú =

Mexican former competitive figure skater

Ana Cecilia Cantú Félix
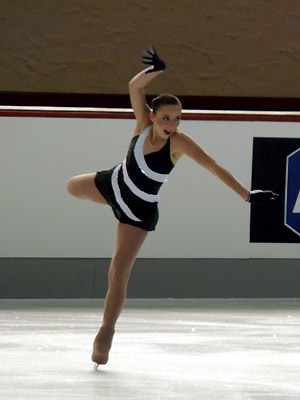
- Cantú in 2007

Personal information
- Born: Ana Cecilia Cantú Felix; September 14, 1985 (age 41) Monterrey, Mexico

Figure skating career
- Country: Mexico
- Coach: Vladimir Petrenko, Galina Zmievskaya, Richard O'Neil, Erica Beckley, Edgar Beckley, Doris Beckley.
- Skating club: Ice Complex (Santa Catarina)
- Began skating: 1992
- Retired: 2016

Ana Cecilia Cantú Felix (born September 14, 1985) is a Mexican former competitive figure skater. She is a four-time national champion (2002–2003, 2006–2007, 2007–2008, 2008–2009). She qualified to the final segment at the 2009 World Figure Skating Championships.

== Personal life ==
Cantú Félix was born on September 14, 1985, in Monterrey, Mexico. She has a younger sister, who also competed internationally in figure skating.

== Career ==
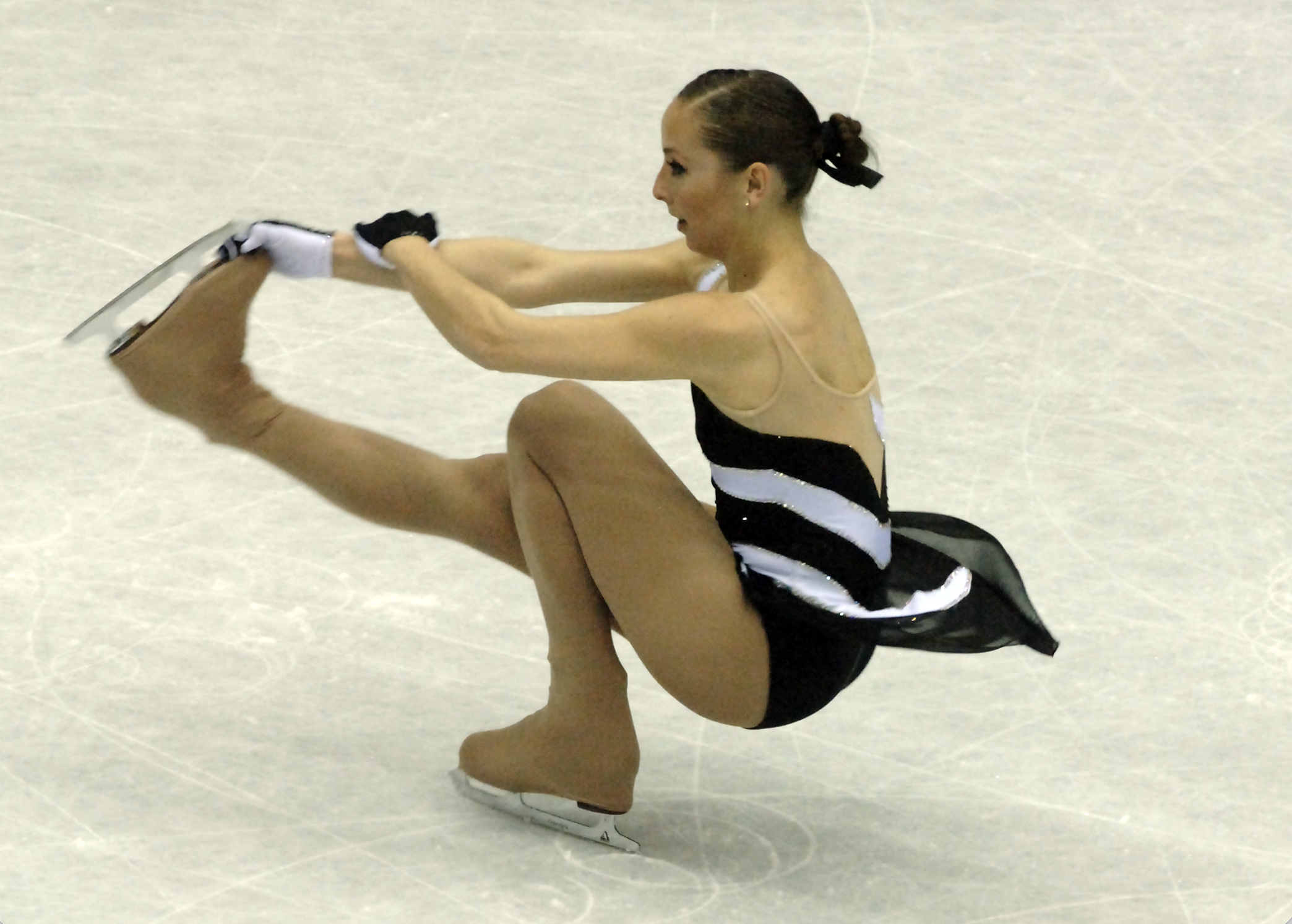
Cantú performing her sit spin variation

Cantú began skating in 1992. In 2001, she debuted on the ISU Junior Grand Prix series at the Salchow Trophy, where she placed 24th.

During the 2002–2003 season, Cantú trained in Monterrey, coached by Edgar Beckley and Doris Beckley, and in Simsbury, Connecticut, coached by Galina Zmievskaya and the Petrenkos. She was assigned to represent Mexico at three ISU Championships – the 2003 Four Continents in Beijing, China; 2003 Junior Worlds in Ostrava, Czech Republic; and 2003 Worlds in Washington, D.C.

She qualified to the free skate at 2003 Four Continents and finished 20th. During the event, Cantú's bag with her skates vanished after the short program, but her teammate, Ingrid Roth, who had not advanced to the next segment, lent her own skates to Cantú.

In the 2004–2005 season, Cantú was coached by the Beckleys and Steve Moore in Simsbury. She placed 22nd at the 2005 Four Continents Championships in Gangneung, South Korea. The following 2 seasons, she trained by herself in Santa Catarina, Nuevo León, Mexico. She ranked 18th at the 2006 Four Continents Championships in Colorado Springs, Colorado.

In 2005, she began training with coach Richard O'Neill.

At the 2009 World Championships in Los Angeles, Cantú qualified to the final segment and finished in 24th place.

Her programs were choreographed by David Wilson, Mark Hird, Shawn Sawyer and herself. During her last international season as a single skater, she returned to be coached by Vladimir Petrenko at the International Skating Center of Connecticut, in Simsbury.

Cantú and her sister founded, competed with, and coached the first Mexican synchronized skating team, known as Merging Edge. The team represented Mexico at the 2013 World Synchronized Skating Championships and continued to compete through 2016. Cantú served as both coach and skater at those championships, along with second coach Donna Mitchell. There were no other Mexican teams to compete against, so they won an invitation to the World Championships by performing exhibitions at various events, which were watched by representatives of the International Skating Union (ISU).

At the 2016 World Synchronized Skating Championships, the Mexican team executed three double axels within the creative element of the free program; Cantú was one of the athletes who performed the jump.

Cantú is the creator of a sit spin variation. After review in competition, the variation was recognized as a difficult sit spin under ISU criteria, and an image of the variation was later included in the ISU Technical Panel Handbook – Single Skating.

== Programs ==
Season	Short program	Free skating
2009–2010	Get Ready for This by 2 Unlimited	OSS 117: Cairo, Nest of Spies by Ludovic Bource
2008–2009	Beetlejuice by Danny Elfman	OSS 117: Cairo, Nest of Spies by Ludovic Bource
2007–2008	Get Ready For This by 2 Unlimited choreo. by Mark Hird	Beetlejuice by Danny Elfman
2006–2007	Get Ready For This by 2 Unlimited choreo. by Mark Hird	Kill Bill Vol. 1
2005–2006	Pachelbel's Canon by Johann Pachelbel	Kill Bill Vol. 1
2004–2005	Pachelbel's Canon by Johann Pachelbel	West Side Story by Leonard Bernstein
2002–2003	Victor/Victoria by Henry Mancini	Work Song by Nat Adderley
2001–2002	Victor/Victoria by Henry Mancini	Twentieth Century Overture

== Results ==
International
Event	97–98	98–99	99–00	00–01	01–02	02–03	03–04	04–05	05–06	06–07	07–08	08–09	09–10	10–11	11–12	12–13
Worlds						39th				42nd		24th	42nd			
Four Continents						20th		22nd	18th	17th	18th	17th	17th			
Merano Cup												5th				
Nebelhorn Trophy											18th	18th	22nd			
U.S. Classic																13th
International: Junior
Junior Worlds						37th										
Germany						18th										
Sweden					24th											
United States						14th										
National
Mexican Champ.	2nd J	2nd J	2nd J	1st J		1st	3rd	3rd	3rd	3rd	1st	1st	1st	2nd	2nd	2nd
J = Junior level; JGP = Junior Grand Prix
