= Misha Ge =

Uzbekistani figure skater (born 1991)

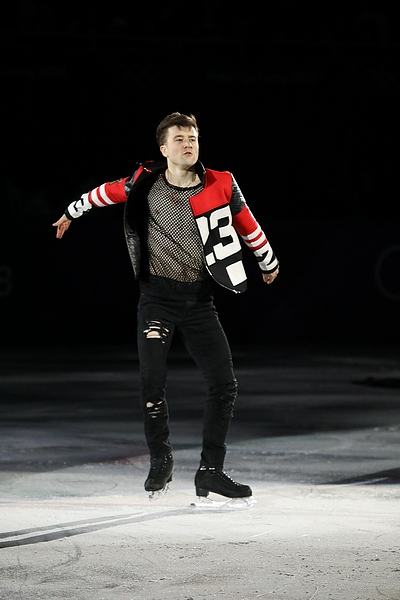
- Ge at the 2018 Winter Olympics

Personal information
- Native name: Михаил Цзюнович Ге
- Born: Mikhail Tszyunovich Ge; 17 May 1991 (age 35) Moscow, Russian SFSR, Soviet Union
- Height: 1.75 m (5 ft 9 in)

Figure skating career
- Country: Uzbekistan (2010–2018); China (2008–2009)
- Discipline: Men's singles
- Began skating: 1994
- Retired: March 25, 2018
- Highest WS: 15th (2015–2016)

Medal record
Uzbek Championships
Gold medal – first place	2011 Tashkent	Singles
Gold medal – first place	2015 Tashkent	Singles
Gold medal – first place	2016 Tashkent	Singles
Gold medal – first place	2017 Tashkent	Singles

Mikhail "Misha" Tszyunovich Ge (Russian: Михаил Цзюнович Ге; born 17 May 1991) is an Uzbekistani figure skating coach, choreographer, and former competitive skater. He is the 2017 Internationaux de France bronze medalist. In addition to this, he has won nine international medals and four Uzbek national titles. He has finished in the top-ten at six ISU Championships, including two World Championships (2015 and 2018), competed at the 2014 Winter Olympics and the 2018 Winter Olympics, finishing 17th in both competitions.

== Personal life ==
Misha Ge was born in Moscow, Russian SFSR, to skating coaches Larisa and Jun Ge. He is of Russian, Chinese, and Korean descent. From the age of about 10, he lived in Beijing, China, where his parents coached. Ge also resided in Hong Kong SAR, Mainland China and Taiwan (ROC). He moved to the United States in mid-2009 and returned to Beijing in 2013. He speaks Russian, Mandarin Chinese, and English. Ge has taken choreography courses at the Beijing Dance Academy and the Hollywood Dance Academy.

In February 2025, he married former competitive South Korean women's singles figure skater, Park So-Youn.

== Career ==
=== As a competitor ===
Having first stepped onto the ice at age three and a half, Misha Ge began training seriously at ten after moving to China. From 2009, he trained in the United States. He started representing Uzbekistan in 2010.

Ge finished 6th at the 2011 Asian Winter Games and 12th at the 2011 Four Continents. He trained in Lake Arrowhead, California with Frank Carroll as his jump coach.

In 2011–12, Ge won silver medals at the Asian Trophy, Ice Challenge, and Istanbul Cup. He was 9th at the 2012 Four Continents.

Ge placed 16th at the 2013 World Championships in London, Ontario. His result earned Uzbekistan a men's entry at the 2014 Winter Olympics. Beijing became Ge's main training base in 2013. In autumn of that year, he received his first Grand Prix assignment, the 2013 Rostelecom Cup. In February 2014, Ge competed at the Winter Olympics in Sochi and finished 17th.

Ge placed 5th at the 2014 Cup of China and 4th at the 2014 Rostelecom Cup. Later during the season, he earned two top-ten placements at the ISU Championships. He placed 8th at the 2015 Four Continents in Seoul (7th in the short, 9th in the free), and 6th at the 2015 World Championships in Shanghai (8th in SP, 7th in FS).

Ge received two 2015–16 Grand Prix assignments but had to withdraw from one, the 2015 Trophée Éric Bompard, due to a visa issue. He finished 8th at the 2015 Cup of China. In October, he won gold at an ISU Challenger Series event, the 2015 CS Denkova-Staviski Cup. Throughout the season, he was hampered by a left ankle injury, which was caused by executing quad jumps.

In 2016–17, he had to compete with an injured left ankle, which was not healed properly. In March 2017, he announced that he might retire from competition at the end of the season.

He decided to continue competing in 2017–18 season. Ge received two 2017–18 Grand Prix assignments. At 2018 Rostelecom Cup, he finished 4th. His next assignment was 2017 Internationaux de France where he placed 3rd and won the bronze medal behind Javier Fernández and Shoma Uno. This was the first time he medaled at a Grand Prix event. At the 2018 Four Continents in Taipei, he placed 6th. In February 2018, Ge then competed at the 2018 Winter Olympics. He placed 14th in the short program and 17th in the free program to finish 17th overall. At the 2018 World Figure Skating Championships, he was 8th in the short program and 9th in the free program. He finished the competition in 9th place, his second top ten finish at Worlds after the 2015 World Championships. He announced his retirement after the competition.

=== As a choreographer ===
In addition to his competitive career, Ge has choreographed skating programs for himself and other skaters. His clients include:

- (Japan) Yuna Aoki
- (Czech Republic) Eliška Březinová
- (United States) Ashley Cain / Timothy Leduc
- (China) Chen Hongyi
- (China) Chen Yudong
- (United States) Karen Chen
- (Japan) Mone Chiba
- (Russia) (United States) Artur Dmitriev Jr.
- (United States) Amber Glenn
- (United States) Gracie Gold
- (United States) Hanna Harrell
- (United States) Tomoki Hiwatashi
- (Japan) Rika Hongo
- (South Korea) Huh Ji-yu
- (South Korea) Ji Seo-yeon
- (China) Jin Boyang
- (South Korea) Kim Hyun-gyeom
- (South Korea) Kim Yu-jae
- (South Korea) Kim Yu-seong
- (Greece) Dimitra Korri
- (Russia) Maxim Kovtun
- (South Korea) Kwon Min-sol
- (South Korea) Lee Hae-in
- (South Korea) Lee Jae-keun
- (South Korea) Lim Ju-heon
- (Russia) Evgenia Medvedeva
- (Japan) Mai Mihara
- (Japan) Saki Miyake
- (Japan) Sena Miyake
- (Japan) Shunsuke Nakamura
- (Japan) Rio Nakata
- (Japan) Kosho Oshima
- (Switzerland) Alexia Paganini
- (United States) Yaroslav Paniot
- (Russia) Alexander Petrov
- (Russia) Anna Pogorilaya
- (Russia) Elena Radionova
- (Canada) Kevin Reynolds
- (United States) Eric Sjoberg
- (Japan) Rion Sumiyoshi
- (Japan) Sena Takahashi
- (Japan) Kazuki Tomono
- (United States) Andrew Torgashev
- (United States) Dinh Tran
- (Russia) Elizaveta Tuktamysheva
- (Kazakhstan) Elizabet Tursynbaeva
- (Japan) Rena Uezono
- (Russia) Sergei Voronov
- (China) Wang Yihan
- (South Korea) Yun Ah-sun
- (South Korea) You Young
- (China) Zhang Siyang / Yang Yongchao

== Programs ==
Season	Short program	Free skating	Exhibition
2017–2018	The Pain of the Heart: Ave Maria (instrumental) by Vladimir Vavilov (Giulio Caccini) performed by Ikuko Kawai	The Memories of Youth: Méditation by Jules Massenet performed by Lucia Micarelli & Lang Lang	Mic Drop (Steve Aoki remix) by BTS ft. Desiigner; Not in That Way by Sam Smith, Fraser T. Smith; Fifty Shades of Grey; Не отрекаются любя by Mark Minkov, Veronika Tushnóva performed by Dima Bilan
2016–2017	Liebesträume by Franz Liszt; Paint It Black by The Rolling Stones	The Nutcracker by Pyotr Ilyich Tchaikovsky	Justin Bieber medley: Baby; Let Me Love You; Great Balls of Fire by Otis Blackwell with Jack Hammer; Juicy Wiggle by Redfoo
2015–2016	Piano Concerto No. 2 in C Minor, Op. 18 by Sergei Rachmaninoff; Pagliacci by Ruggero Leoncavallo performed by Luciano Pavarotti	Nocturne No. 19 E minor by Frédéric Chopin	Get Low (Remix) by Dillon Francis, DJ Snake; Daisuke Takahashi Tribute; Eye by COBA; Historia de un Amor played by Pérez Prado; Swan Lake (Hip hop version) by Pyotr Ilyich Tchaikovsky; Fumiya Sashida – Ballad by Fumiya Sashida
2014–2015	Ave Maria by Vladimir Vavilov (Giulio Caccini) performed by Hayley Westenra	The Umbrellas of Cherbourg by Michel Legrand	Uptown Funk by Bruno Mars; GOODBOY by G-Dragon; Let's Get Freak Out by Lil Jon; Bend Ova; Let's Get Freak Out by Lil Jon; Thinking Out Loud by Ed Sheeran
2013–2014	Still Got the Blues by Gary Moore; Adagio in G minor by Tomaso Albinoni, Remo Giazotto	World Dance Collection: Neo Tango by Gotan Project; Rhumba d'Amour; Libella Swing by Parov Stelar; Tutti Frutti by Little Richard; Variations on a Theme by Paganini by Sergei Rachmaninoff	Overdose by Exo; Say Something by A Great Big World feat. Christina Aguilera; Crooked Gentleman: Crooked by G-Dragon; Gentleman by Psy; The Hardest Ever by Will.i.am; Miracles in December by Exo; Warrior by B.A.P
2012–2013	Farrucas by Pepe Romero; Flamenco by Thomas Espanner	Charlie Chaplin feat. Hip Hop	Gentleman - Club House Mix by Psy; Gangnam Style by Psy
2011–2012	The Swan by Camille Saint-Saëns	War and Love by Invincible	Fever by Adam Lambert
2010–2011	Capone by Ronan Hardiman	Requiem for a Tower by Clint Mansell	Girls On The Dance Floor by Far East Movement ft. Stereotypes

== Competitive highlights ==
- GP – Event of the ISU Grand Prix Series
- CS – Event of the ISU Challenger Series

=== Single skating (for Uzbekistan) ===
Competition placements at senior level
Season	2009–10	2010–11	2011–12	2012–13	2013–14	2014–15	2015–16	2016–17	2017–18
Winter Olympics					17th				17th
World Championships		30th	19th	16th	27th	6th	15th	12th	9th
Four Continents Championships		12th	9th	11th	13th	8th		7th	6th
Ukbek Championships	1st	1st				1st	1st	1st	1st
GP Cup of China						5th	8th		
GP Internationaux de France								7th	3rd
GP Rostelecom Cup					8th				4th
GP Skate Canada								6th	
CS Autumn Classic								2nd	4th
CS Denkova-Staviski Cup				1st	1st		1st		
CS Finlandia Trophy				6th		4th			
Asian Open Trophy			2nd		2nd				
Asian Winter Games		6th						6th	
Cup of Nice			8th						
Ice Challenge			2nd	4th					
Istanbul Cup			2nd						
NRW Trophy				5th					
Warsaw Cup				2nd					

=== Single skating (for China) ===
Competition placements at senior level
Season	2003-04	2008–09
Chinese Championships		6th
Hong Kong Championships	1st	

== Detailed results ==
2017–18 season
Date	Event	SP	FS	Total
19–25 March 2018	2018 World Championships	8; 86.01	9; 163.56	9; 249.57
15–23 February 2018	2018 Winter Olympics	14; 83.90	17; 161.04	17; 244.94
22–28 January 2018	2018 Four Continents Championships	8; 82.27	7; 166.69	6; 248.96
17–19 November 2017	2017 Internationaux de France	6; 85.41	3; 172.93	3; 258.34
20–22 October 2017	2017 Rostelecom Cup	5; 85.02	4; 170.31	4; 255.33
20–23 September 2017	2017 CS Autumn Classic	5; 83.64	2; 162.55	4; 246.19
2016–17 season
Date	Event	SP	FS	Total
29 March – 2 April 2017	2017 World Championships	16; 79.91	10; 163.53	12; 243.45
15–19 February 2017	2017 Four Continents Championships	8; 81.85	8; 157.56	7; 239.41
11–13 November 2016	2016 Trophée de France	8; 72.49	6; 156.57	7; 229.06
28–30 October 2016	2016 Skate Canada International	7; 72.30	5; 153.77	6; 226.07
29 Sept. – 1 Oct. 2016	2016 CS Autumn Classic International	2; 79.52	3; 151.03	2; 230.55
2015–16 season
Date	Event	SP	FS	Total
28 March – 3 April 2016	2016 World Championships	15; 77.43	14; 146.10	15; 223.53
6–8 November 2015	2015 Cup of China	9; 69.13	6; 148.04	8; 217.17
2014–15 season
Date	Event	SP	FS	Total
23–29 March 2015	2015 World Championships	8; 78.52	7; 156.37	6; 236.89
9–15 February 2015	2015 Four Continents Championships	7; 82.25	9; 143.95	8; 226.20
14–16 November 2014	2014 Rostelecom Cup	5; 79.69	5; 158.36	4; 238.05
7–9 November 2014	2014 Cup of China	7; 69.46	3; 149.82	5; 219.28
9–12 October 2014	2014 CS Finlandia Trophy	4; 64.96	4; 138.55	4; 203.51
2013–14 season
Date	Event	SP	FS	Total
24–30 March 2014	2014 World Championships	27; 60.34	DNQ	27; 60.34
13–14 February 2014	2014 Winter Olympics	18; 68.07	17; 135.19	17; 203.26
20–26 January 2014	2014 Four Continents Championships	12; 65.26	14; 123.15	13; 188.41
29 Nov. – 1 Dec. 2013	2013 Denkova-Staviski Cup	1; 66.80	1; 132.40	1; 199.20
22–24 November 2013	2013 Rostelecom Cup	8; 63.23	8; 127.05	8; 190.28
8–11 August 2013	2013 Asian Open Trophy	2; 69.61	2; 134.02	13; 203.63
