= Julia Antipova =

Russian pair skater

Personal information
- Native name: Юлия Валерьевна Антипова
- Full name: Julia Valeryevna Antipova
- Born: 18 December 1997 (age 28) Moscow, Russia
- Home town: Zelenograd, Russia
- Height: 1.57 m (5 ft 2 in)

Figure skating career
- Country: Russia
- Partner: Nodari Maisuradze
- Coach: Artur Dmitriev
- Skating club: UOR 4 Moscow
- Began skating: 2001

Julia Valeryevna Antipova (Russian: Юлия Валерьевна Антипова; born 18 December 1997) is a Russian pair skater. With partner Nodari Maisuradze, she is the 2014 Bavarian Open champion and placed eighth at the 2014 World Championships.

== Personal life ==
Julia Valeryevna Antipova was born 18 December 1997 in Zelenograd, Russia.

== Career ==
Antipova began skating in 2001. Her first coach was Natalia Borisovna Egorova.

At age 14, Antipova switched from singles to pairs, teaming up with Nodari Maisuradze. The pair began training in July 2012. They placed fourth at the 2013 Russian Championships and then won silver in their international debut at the 2013 Bavarian Open. Natalia Pavlova and Artur Dmitriev jointly coached the pair in their first season together.

In the summer of 2013, Antipova/Maisuradze lost some training time due to injury and their search for a new coaching situation. The Russian federation having decided they would stay in the short term with Dmitriev, the pair returned to training in early August, working with Dmitriev separately from his and Pavlova's main group. Antipova/Maisuradze placed fifth at their sole Grand Prix assignment, the 2013 Rostelecom Cup. In the free skate, they executed a quadruple twist, their first in competition. After placing fourth again at the Russian Championships, the pair won their first international, the 2014 Bavarian Open, and were assigned to the 2014 World Championships after Tatiana Volosozhar / Maxim Trankov decided to miss the event. Making their World debut, the pair finished eighth in Saitama, Japan.

Antipova/Maisuradze decided to remain with Dmitriev in the 2014–15 season. They were chosen to compete at the 2014 Cup of China and 2014 NHK Trophy. In September 2014, Dmitriev said Antipova was being treated in a Moscow hospital for an eating disorder. Her father said her water intake was also low. Accompanied by her parents, she flew to Israel on 20 October for treatment in a specialized clinic. In December, the Figure Skating Federation of Russia said it could no longer pay for her treatment in Israel but would cover the costs of care in Russia, although her parents found the latter less effective.

== Programs ==
(with Maisuradze)

Season	Short program	Free skating	Exhibition
2013–2014	Beethoven's Five Secrets by The Piano Guys	Money; The Great Gig in the Sky by Pink Floyd; Back in Black by AC/DC	Maybe I, Maybe You by the Scorpions
2012–2013	Kalinka	Take Five; Hit the Road Jack	

== Competitive highlights ==
(with Maisuradze)

GP: Grand Prix; JGP: Junior Grand Prix

International
Event	2012–13	2013–14	2014–15
World Champ.		8th	
GP Cup of China			WD
GP NHK Trophy			WD
GP Rostelecom Cup		5th	
Bavarian Open	2nd	1st	
Cup of Nice		4th	
National
Russian Champ.	4th	4th	
WD = Withdrew
