= 2015 ISU World Team Trophy in Figure Skating =

Figure skating competition

2015 World Team Trophy
- Type: ISU Event
- Date: April 16 – 19
- Season: 2014–15
- Location: Tokyo, Japan
- Host: Japan Skating Federation
- Venue: Yoyogi National Gymnasium
- Previous: 2013 ISU World Team Trophy
- Next: 2017 ISU World Team Trophy

The 2015 ISU World Team Trophy is an international team figure skating competition that was held during the 2014–15 season. Participating countries selected two men's single skaters, two ladies' single skaters, one pair and one ice dancing entry to compete in a team format with points based on the skaters' placement.

== Entries ==
Country	Men	Ladies	Pairs	Ice dancing
Canada	Nam Nguyen; Jeremy Ten	Alaine Chartrand; Gabrielle Daleman	Meagan Duhamel / Eric Radford	Kaitlyn Weaver / Andrew Poje
China	Song Nan; Yan Han	Li Zijun; Zhao Ziquan	Sui Wenjing / Han Cong	Wang Shiyue / Liu Xinyu
France	Florent Amodio; Romain Ponsart	Laurine Lecavelier; Maé-Bérénice Méité	Vanessa James / Morgan Ciprès	Gabriella Papadakis / Guillaume Cizeron
Japan	Yuzuru Hanyu; Takahito Mura	Satoko Miyahara; Kanako Murakami	Ami Koga / Francis Boudreau-Audet	Cathy Reed / Chris Reed
Russia	Maxim Kovtun; Sergei Voronov	Elena Radionova; Elizaveta Tuktamysheva	Yuko Kavaguti / Alexander Smirnov	Elena Ilinykh / Ruslan Zhiganshin
United States	Max Aaron; Jason Brown	Gracie Gold; Ashley Wagner	Alexa Scimeca / Chris Knierim	Madison Chock / Evan Bates

== Results ==
=== Team standings ===
Rank	Nation	Men		Ladies		Pairs		Ice dancing		Total team points
Rank	Nation	SP	FS	SP	FS	SP	FS	SD	FD	Total team points
1	United States	16	16	21	17	9	10	11	10	110
2	Russia	13	15	21	23	10	9	9	9	109
3	Japan	21	22	15	17	7	7	7	7	103
4	Canada	10	10	9	7	11	12	12	11	82
5	China	12	12	7	7	12	11	8	8	77
6	France	6	3	5	7	8	8	10	12	59

=== Men ===
Rank	Name	Nation	Total points	SP		Team points	FS		Team points
1	Yuzuru Hanyu	Japan	288.58	1	96.27	12	1	192.31	12
2	Jason Brown	United States	263.17	3	86.48	10	2	176.69	11
3	Yan Han	China	250.27	2	87.13	11	4	163.14	9
4	Takahito Mura	Japan	247.44	4	82.04	9	3	165.40	10
5	Sergei Voronov	Russia	241.01	5	79.09	8	5	161.92	8
6	Nam Nguyen	Canada	236.05	6	77.42	7	7	158.63	6
7	Maxim Kovtun	Russia	233.74	8	74.83	5	6	158.91	7
8	Max Aaron	United States	227.51	7	76.08	6	8	151.43	5
9	Jeremy Ten	Canada	194.78	10	67.45	3	9	127.33	4
10	Florent Amodio	France	194.54	9	73.80	4	11	120.74	2
11	Song Nan	China	187.42	12	62.43	1	10	124.99	3
12	Romain Ponsart	France	184.12	11	63.51	2	12	120.61	1

=== Ladies ===
Rank	Name	Nation	Total points	SP		Team points	FS		Team points
1	Elizaveta Tuktamysheva	Russia	205.14	2	70.93	11	1	134.21	12
2	Elena Radionova	Russia	198.50	3	68.77	10	2	129.73	11
3	Gracie Gold	United States	195.55	1	71.26	12	5	124.29	8
4	Ashley Wagner	United States	191.51	4	64.55	9	4	126.96	9
5	Satoko Miyahara	Japan	189.64	6	60.52	7	3	129.12	10
6	Kanako Murakami	Japan	175.71	5	62.39	8	6	113.32	7
7	Li Zijun	China	162.50	7	58.83	6	7	103.67	6
8	Gabrielle Daleman	Canada	156.46	8	57.59	5	8	98.87	5
9	Laurine Lecavelier	France	148.27	10	52.84	3	9	95.43	4
10	Maé-Bérénice Méité	France	142.83	11	52.06	2	10	90.77	3
11	Alaine Chartrand	Canada	136.54	9	54.64	4	11	81.90	2
12	Zhao Ziquan	China	120.89	12	44.92	1	12	75.97	1

=== Pairs ===
Rank	Name	Nation	Total points	SP		Team points	FS		Team points
1	Sui Wenjing / Han Cong	China	210.93	1	71.20	12	2	139.73	11
2	Meagan Duhamel / Eric Radford	Canada	209.38	2	68.68	11	1	140.70	12
3	Yuko Kavaguti / Alexander Smirnov	Russia	194.04	3	66.97	10	4	127.07	9
4	Alexa Scimeca / Chris Knierim	United States	192.09	4	64.22	9	3	127.87	10
5	Vanessa James / Morgan Ciprès	France	167.97	5	58.66	8	5	109.31	8
6	Ami Koga / Francis Boudreau-Audet	Japan	135.29	6	46.87	7	6	88.42	7

=== Ice dancing ===
Rank	Name	Nation	Total points	SD		Team points	FD		Team points
1	Kaitlyn Weaver / Andrew Poje	Canada	182.93	1	73.14	12	2	109.79	11
2	Gabriella Papadakis / Guillaume Cizeron	France	181.92	3	70.86	10	1	111.06	12
3	Madison Chock / Evan Bates	United States	174.41	2	72.17	11	3	102.24	10
4	Elena Ilinykh / Ruslan Zhiganshin	Russia	158.19	4	63.09	9	4	95.10	9
5	Wang Shiyue / Liu Xinyu	China	142.31	5	55.32	8	5	86.99	8
6	Cathy Reed / Chris Reed	Japan	123.23	6	49.99	7	6	73.24	7
