= 2013 Rostelecom Cup =

- Type: Grand Prix
- Date: November 22 – 24
- Season: 2013–14
- Location: Moscow
- Host: Figure Skating Federation of Russia
- Venue: Luzhniki Small Sports Arena

Champions
- Men's singles: (Japan) Tatsuki Machida
- Ladies' singles: (Russia) Yulia Lipnitskaya
- Pairs: (Germany) Aliona Savchenko / Robin Szolkowy
- Ice dance: (Russia) Ekaterina Bobrova / Dmitri Soloviev
- Previous: 2012 Rostelecom Cup
- Next: 2014 Rostelecom Cup
- Previous GP: 2013 Trophée Éric Bompard
- Next GP: 2013–14 Grand Prix Final

The 2013 Rostelecom Cup was the final event of six in the 2013–14 ISU Grand Prix of Figure Skating, a senior-level international invitational competition series. It was held at the Luzhniki Small Sports Arena in Moscow on November 22–24. Medals were awarded in the disciplines of men's singles, ladies' singles, pair skating, and ice dancing. Skaters earned points toward qualifying for the 2013–14 Grand Prix Final.

== Eligibility ==
Skaters who reached the age of 14 by July 1, 2013 were eligible to compete on the senior Grand Prix circuit.

== Entries ==
The entries were as follows.

Country	Men	Ladies	Pairs	Ice dancing
Canada			Kirsten Moore-Towers / Dylan Moscovitch	Piper Gilles / Paul Poirier; Kaitlyn Weaver / Andrew Poje
France				Gabriella Papadakis / Guillaume Cizeron
Germany	Peter Liebers		Aliona Savchenko / Robin Szolkowy	
Italy		Carolina Kostner		
Japan	Tatsuki Machida	Haruka Imai; Satoko Miyahara; Kanako Murakami	Narumi Takahashi / Ryuichi Kihara	
Russia	Artur Gachinski; Maxim Kovtun; Konstantin Menshov	Nikol Gosviani; Yulia Lipnitskaya; Elizaveta Tuktamysheva	Julia Antipova / Nodari Maisuradze; Vera Bazarova / Yuri Larionov; Ksenia Stolbova / Fedor Klimov	Ekaterina Bobrova / Dmitri Soloviev; Ekaterina Riazanova / Ilia Tkachenko; Ksenia Monko / Kirill Khaliavin
Spain	Javier Fernández			
Ukraine				Siobhan Heekin-Canedy / Dmitri Dun
United States	Richard Dornbush; Joshua Farris	Mirai Nagasu; Agnes Zawadzki	Lindsay Davis / Rockne Brubaker; Alexa Scimeca / Chris Knierim	Madison Chock / Evan Bates
Uzbekistan	Misha Ge			

Kevin Reynolds withdrew. He was replaced by Misha Ge. On 13 November 2013, it was announced that Evgeni Plushenko had withdrawn from the event due to injury. He was replaced by Konstantin Menshov. Brian Joubert withdrew and was not replaced.

In the ladies' event, Kaetlyn Osmond withdrew and was not replaced.

In the pairs' event, Britney Simpson / Matthew Blackmer withdrew and were replaced by Lindsay Davis / Rockne Brubaker.

== Results ==
=== Men ===
Rank	Name	Nation	Total points	SP		FS	
1	Tatsuki Machida	Japan	257.00	2	84.90	1	172.10
2	Maxim Kovtun	Russia	240.34	1	92.53	4	147.81
3	Javier Fernández	Spain	226.99	3	81.87	5	145.12
4	Konstantin Menshov	Russia	223.03	4	72.43	3	150.60
5	Richard Dornbush	United States	215.45	7	63.74	2	151.71
6	Artur Gachinski	Russia	211.49	5	72.18	6	139.31
7	Peter Liebers	Germany	197.65	6	65.38	7	132.27
8	Misha Ge	Uzbekistan	190.28	8	63.23	8	127.05
WD	Joshua Farris	United States					

=== Ladies ===
Rank	Name	Nation	Total points	SP		FS	
1	Yulia Lipnitskaya	Russia	190.80	1	72.24	2	118.56
2	Carolina Kostner	Italy	190.12	2	67.74	1	122.38
3	Mirai Nagasu	United States	175.37	4	60.44	3	114.93
4	Elizaveta Tuktamysheva	Russia	171.87	5	60.16	5	111.71
5	Satoko Miyahara	Japan	165.76	6	56.57	6	109.19
6	Agnes Zawadzki	United States	163.21	3	60.45	8	102.76
7	Kanako Murakami	Japan	162.46	9	49.24	4	113.22
8	Nikol Gosviani	Russia	157.17	7	50.21	7	106.96
9	Haruka Imai	Japan	145.30	8	49.55	9	95.75

=== Pairs ===
Rank	Name	Nation	Total points	SP		FS	
1	Aliona Savchenko / Robin Szolkowy	Germany	206.33	1	73.25	1	133.08
2	Vera Bazarova / Yuri Larionov	Russia	201.61	2	69.72	2	131.89
3	Kirsten Moore-Towers / Dylan Moscovitch	Canada	188.73	3	65.65	4	123.08
4	Ksenia Stolbova / Fedor Klimov	Russia	188.10	6	57.20	3	130.90
5	Julia Antipova / Nodari Maisuradze	Russia	181.50	4	62.87	5	118.63
6	Alexa Scimeca / Chris Knierim	United States	173.70	5	59.56	6	114.14
7	Lindsay Davis / Rockne Brubaker	United States	151.90	7	51.59	7	100.31
8	Narumi Takahashi / Ryuichi Kihara	Japan	141.41	8	48.64	8	92.77

=== Ice dancing ===
Rank	Name	Nation	Total points	SD		FD	
1	Ekaterina Bobrova / Dmitri Soloviev	Russia	168.32	1	68.42	2	99.90
2	Kaitlyn Weaver / Andrew Poje	Canada	163.14	2	61.50	1	101.64
3	Madison Chock / Evan Bates	United States	153.37	4	57.80	3	95.57
4	Ekaterina Riazanova / Ilia Tkachenko	Russia	152.36	3	58.59	4	93.77
5	Ksenia Monko / Kirill Khaliavin	Russia	145.92	5	55.83	5	90.09
6	Piper Gilles / Paul Poirier	Canada	134.66	6	51.14	6	83.52
7	Gabriella Papadakis / Guillaume Cizeron	France	124.27	8	44.49	7	79.78
8	Siobhan Heekin-Canedy / Dmitri Dun	Ukraine	123.57	7	45.00	8	78.57
