= Yuri Larionov =

Russian pair skater (born 1986)

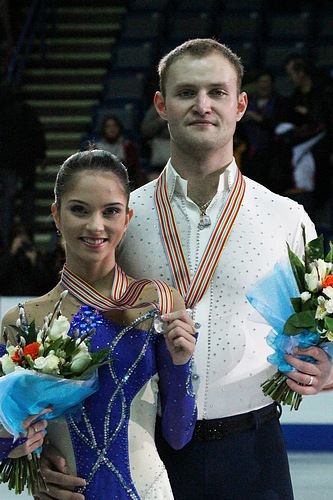
- Bazarova and Larionov at the 2012 European Championships

Personal information
- Full name: Yuri Yuryevich Larionov
- Born: 19 August 1986 (age 40) Novosibirsk, Russian SFSR, Soviet Union
- Height: 1.81 m (5 ft 11 in)

Figure skating career
- Country: Russia
- Skating club: Vorobievye Gory
- Began skating: 1990
Medal record
Representing Russia
Figure skating: Pairs
European Championships
Silver medal – second place	2012 Sheffield	Pairs
Bronze medal – third place	2011 Bern	Pairs
Bronze medal – third place	2014 Budapest	Pairs
Grand Prix Final
Silver medal – second place	2012–13 Sochi	Pairs
World Junior Championships
Silver medal – second place	2007 Oberstdorf	Pairs

Yuri Yuryevich Larionov (Russian: Юрий Юрьевич Ларионов, born 19 August 1986) is a Russian pair skater. With former partner Vera Bazarova, he is the 2012–13 Grand Prix Final silver medalist, a three-time European medalist (silver in 2012; bronze in 2011 and 2014), the 2007 World Junior silver medalist, and the 2012 Russian national champion. They won six senior Grand Prix series medals outside the final, including gold at the 2012 NHK Trophy.

== Early life and education ==
Larionov was born on 19 August 1986 in Novosibirsk, Russian SFSR, Soviet Union. His family later moved to Tashkent, Uzbek SSR, due to his father's army service. He began skating in 1990, introduced to the activity by his mother, who was concerned about his health. He decided to continue skating after the family returned to Novosibirsk and later trained for four years in Moscow before moving to Perm. His first skating partner was Dinara Kalimulina.

Larionov studied at Perm State Pedagogical University, Faculty of Physical Education.

== Partnership with Bazarova ==
=== 2005–09 season ===
In spring 2005, coach Ludmila Kalinina paired him with Vera Bazarova. They trained in Perm at the Orlenok Ice Palace until 2011.

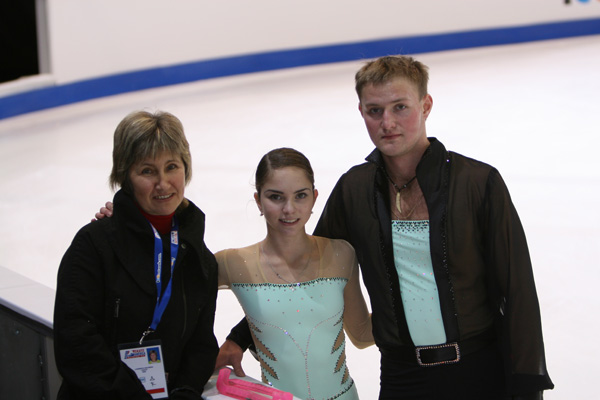
Bazarova/Larionov at the 2007 Skate America with former coach Ludmila Kalinina

Bazarova/Larionov took silver at the 2007 World Junior Championships. In October, they won their first senior international medal when they claimed the bronze at 2007 Skate America. In December of the same year, the pair won gold at the 2007 Junior Grand Prix Final. However, in January 2008, they were disqualified and stripped of the medal due to a doping violation found in a blood sample Larionov gave before the Final. Larionov was also suspended for two years, beginning on 18 January 2008. His sentence was later reduced to 18 months and ended on 17 July 2009. Bazarova decided to wait for Larionov: "There were offers from others, but I said right away that I'm not going to skate with someone else."

=== 2009–10 season ===
Bazarova/Larionov made their return to competition during the 2009–10 season. Their first event was the 2009 Cup of Russia where they placed fourth and they won the bronze medal at Russian Nationals, earning them further assignments. In January 2010, the pair finished 5th at the European Championships. In February, they placed 11th at the Olympics and then completed their season with an 8th-place finish at the World Championships in March. They were named Breakthrough of the Year (pair skating) at the 2010 Crystal Ice Awards held in October 2010 in Moscow.

=== 2010–11 season ===
Bazarova/Larionov began the 2010–11 season with a win at 2010 Nebelhorn Trophy in September. Their first Grand Prix event was the 2010 NHK Trophy in October, where they won the silver medal. At 2010 Trophée Eric Bompard, they won another silver medal, in doing so setting new personal best scores in the short program (64.18) and long program (118.82). Their results qualified them for the Grand Prix Final, their first at the senior level, where they finished fifth. At the Russian Nationals they won their second bronze medal.

At the 2011 European Championships, they won the bronze medal after finishing third in both programs and setting personal best scores in the long program and combined total (188.24). Although many skaters, including those based at other Russian training centers, criticized the freezing conditions at the arena, Bazarova said, "At home in our ice rink in Perm, it can also be very cold so we are kind of used to it." At the 2011 World Championships, they finished 5th.

=== 2011–12 season ===
In June 2011, it was reported that Bazarova/Larionov would move along with their coach, Ludmila Kalinina, from Perm to Saransk. Bazarova said they were comfortable in Saransk, also the host of the 2011 and 2012 Russian national championships. The pair's first event of the 2011–12 season was Nebelhorn Trophy, where they won silver. They were 5th at 2011 Skate America, their first Grand Prix event of the season. At 2011 Trophée Eric Bompard, they won the silver medal with a new personal best in the free program. Bazarova/Larionov won their first national title at the 2012 Russian Championships. At the 2012 European Championships, they set new personal bests in their short and long programs. They scored a total of 193.79 points overall and won the silver medal. They finished 6th at the 2012 World Championships. Bazarova/Larionov were assigned to represent Team Russia at the 2012 World Team Trophy. They placed first in the pairs event.

=== 2012–13 season ===
Bazarova/Larionov decided to spend more time in Novogorsk (near Moscow) working with former Bolshoi soloist Liudmila Vlasova, who assisted them with interpretation. They withdrew from the 2012 Nebelhorn Trophy after the short program due to a recurring injury to Bazarova's right hip. On November 1, Larionov said the injury did not require an operation. Bazarova said it was not painful but her leg would feel very weak at times and that massage treated the problem effectively.

After taking silver at the 2012 Rostelecom Cup, Bazarova/Larionov won their first Grand Prix title at the 2012 NHK Trophy. They qualified for their second Grand Prix Final. At the final in Sochi, Russia, they won the silver medal with personal best scores in both programs and a total of 201.60 points.

Bazarova/Larionov withdrew from the 2013 Russian Championships. Aleksandr Gorshkov said that Larionov had boot problems and could not endanger his partner. The pair was named in the Russian team to the 2013 European Championships but withdrew due to Larionov's wrist injury which prevented him from doing a number of pairs elements. They were replaced by Ksenia Stolbova / Fedor Klimov. Larionov had an operation in Moscow. On 21 February 2013, Larionov confirmed they were no longer working with Ludmila Kalinina. The pair trained in Novogorsk, Moscow, advised by Viktor Kudriavtsev, in the period leading up to the 2013 World Championships, with a decision on a new main coach likely to be made after the event. Bazarova injured her hip on a fall while training in Detroit before Worlds. They finished 7th at the event.

On 26 March 2013, Bazarova/Larionov announced they would be coached by Nina Mozer. In preparation for the 2013–14 season, the pair began training in Moscow and then travelled with Mozer's group to West Orange, New Jersey in May.

=== 2013–14 season ===
At the start of the season, Bazarova/Larionov considered adding a quadruple twist but decided against it. During the 2013–14 Grand Prix series, they placed fourth at the 2013 Trophee Eric Bompard and then won the silver medal at the 2013 Rostelecom Cup, behind Aliona Savchenko / Robin Szolkowy. After winning the 2013 NRW Trophy, the pair took silver at the 2014 Russian Championships, losing by a margin of 0.45 to Ksenia Stolbova / Fedor Klimov. At the 2014 European Championships, Bazarova/Larionov won the bronze medal, again finishing behind Stolbova/Klimov.

In February 2014, Bazarova/Larionov appeared at their second Olympics, in Sochi. They were not selected for the team event but did compete in the separate pairs event, placing sixth. The next month, they competed at the 2014 World Championships in Saitama, Japan. During the free skate, Larionov stumbled while setting Bazarova down from a lift but they avoided injury and finished seventh overall. Later that day, 27 March 2014, he told Bazarova he wanted to end their partnership. Nina Mozer made the split public several days later and said she was working to arrange a new partnership for him.

== Partnership with Zabiyako ==
Larionov teamed up with Estonia's Natalya Zabiyako to compete for Russia. At the 2015 Russian Championships, they placed 5th in the short program and 7th overall. In June 2015, Zabiyako said that she and Larionov had ended their partnership.

== Programs ==
=== With Zabiyako ===
Season	Short program	Free skating
2014–15	The Phantom of the Opera by Andrew Lloyd Webber	Requiem pour un Fou by Lara Fabian

=== With Bazarova ===
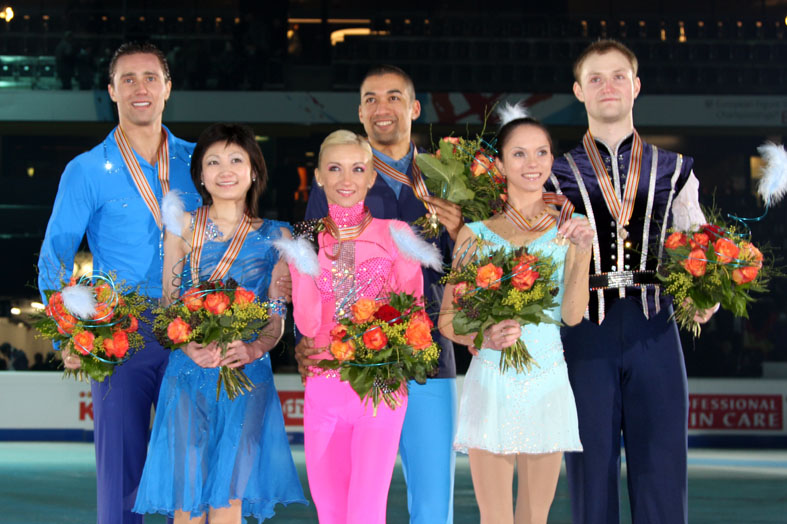
Bazarova/Larionov at the 2011 European Championships

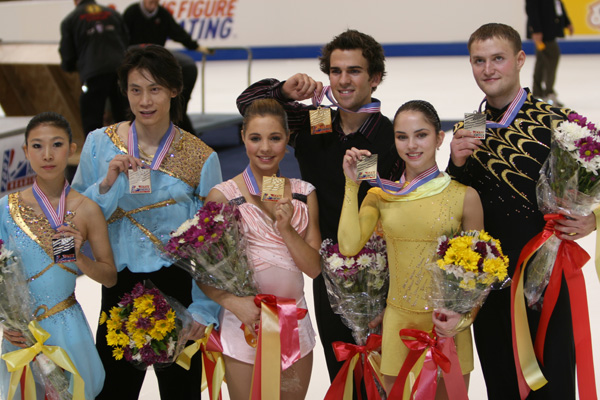
Bazarova/Larionov at the 2007 Skate America

Season	Short program	Free skating	Exhibition
2013–14	Titine (from Modern Times) by Charlie Chaplin performed by Stanley Black; Paris by Night: Je cherche après Titine (modern arrangement) by Bob Sinclar choreo. by Nikolai Morozov	Polovtsian Dances (from Prince Igor) by Alexander Borodin	Tosca by Giacomo Puccini
2012–13	Liebestraum by Franz Liszt choreo. by Tatiana Tarasova	Spartacus by Aram Khachaturian choreo. by Igor Shpilband, Marina Zueva	Remember (from Troy) by Josh Groban, Tanja Carovska
2011–12	Tosca by Giacomo Puccini arranged by Maxime Rodriguez	Doctor Zhivago by Maurice Jarre	Remember (from Troy) by Josh Groban, Tanja Carovska
2010–11	Adagio by Secret Garden	The Man in the Iron Mask by Nick Glennie-Smith	Remember (from Troy) by Josh Groban, Tanja Carovska
2009–10	Sadness (Грусть) (from Satisfaktsiya (Сатисфакция)) by Igor Kamensky	Seven Years in Tibet by John Williams; The Story of Voyages by Alfred Schnittke	Remember (from Troy) by Josh Groban, Tanja Carovska
2007–08	Shadowboxing by Alexei Shelygin	Eragon by Patrick Doyle	
2006–07	Love Story by Francis Lai	Amélie by Yann Tiersen	

== Competitive highlights ==
GP: Grand Prix; JGP: Junior Grand Prix

=== With Zabiyako ===
National
Event	2014–15
Russian Championships	7th

=== With Bazarova ===
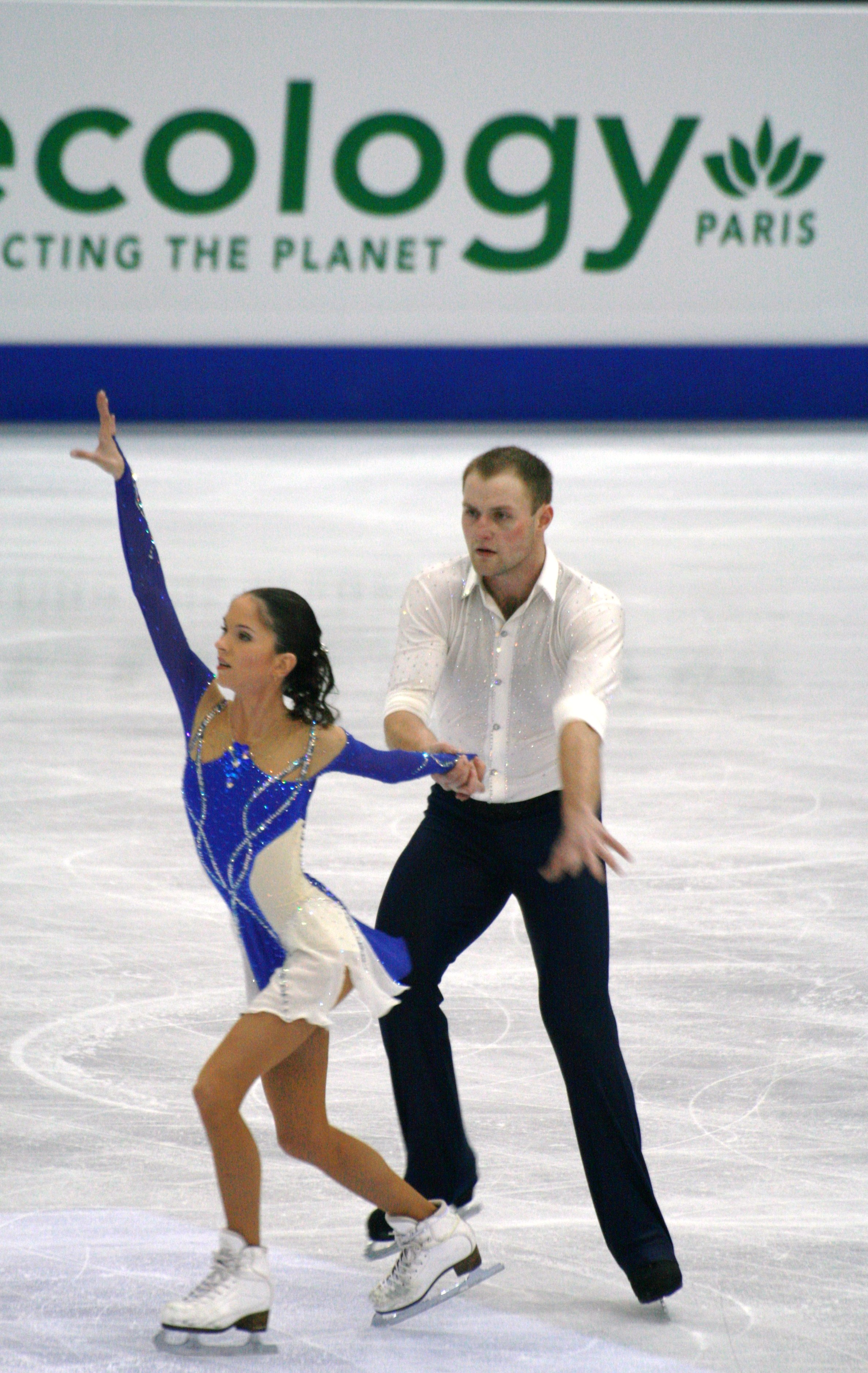
Bazarova/Larionov at the 2012 World Team Trophy

International
Event	06–07	07–08	08–09	09–10	10–11	11–12	12–13	13–14
Olympics				11th				6th
World Champ.				8th	5th	6th	7th	7th
European Champ.				5th	3rd	2nd	WD	3rd
GP Final					5th		2nd	
GP Bompard					2nd	2nd		4th
GP NHK Trophy					2nd		1st	
GP Rostelecom Cup				4th			2nd	2nd
GP Skate America		3rd				5th		
Nebelhorn Trophy					1st	2nd	WD	
NRW Trophy								1st
International: Junior
World Junior Champ.	2nd							
JGP Final	7th	~~1st~~ D						
JGP Germany		2nd						
JGP Norway	4th							
JGP Taiwan	2nd							
JGP United Kingdom		1st						
National
Russian Champ.	7th	6th		3rd	3rd	1st	WD	2nd
Russian Jr. Champ.	2nd							
Team events
World Team Trophy						5th T 1st P		
D = Disqualified; WD = Withdrew; T = Team result; P = Personal result. Medals awarded for team result only. Bazarova/Larionov did not compete in the 2008–09 season.

== Detailed results ==
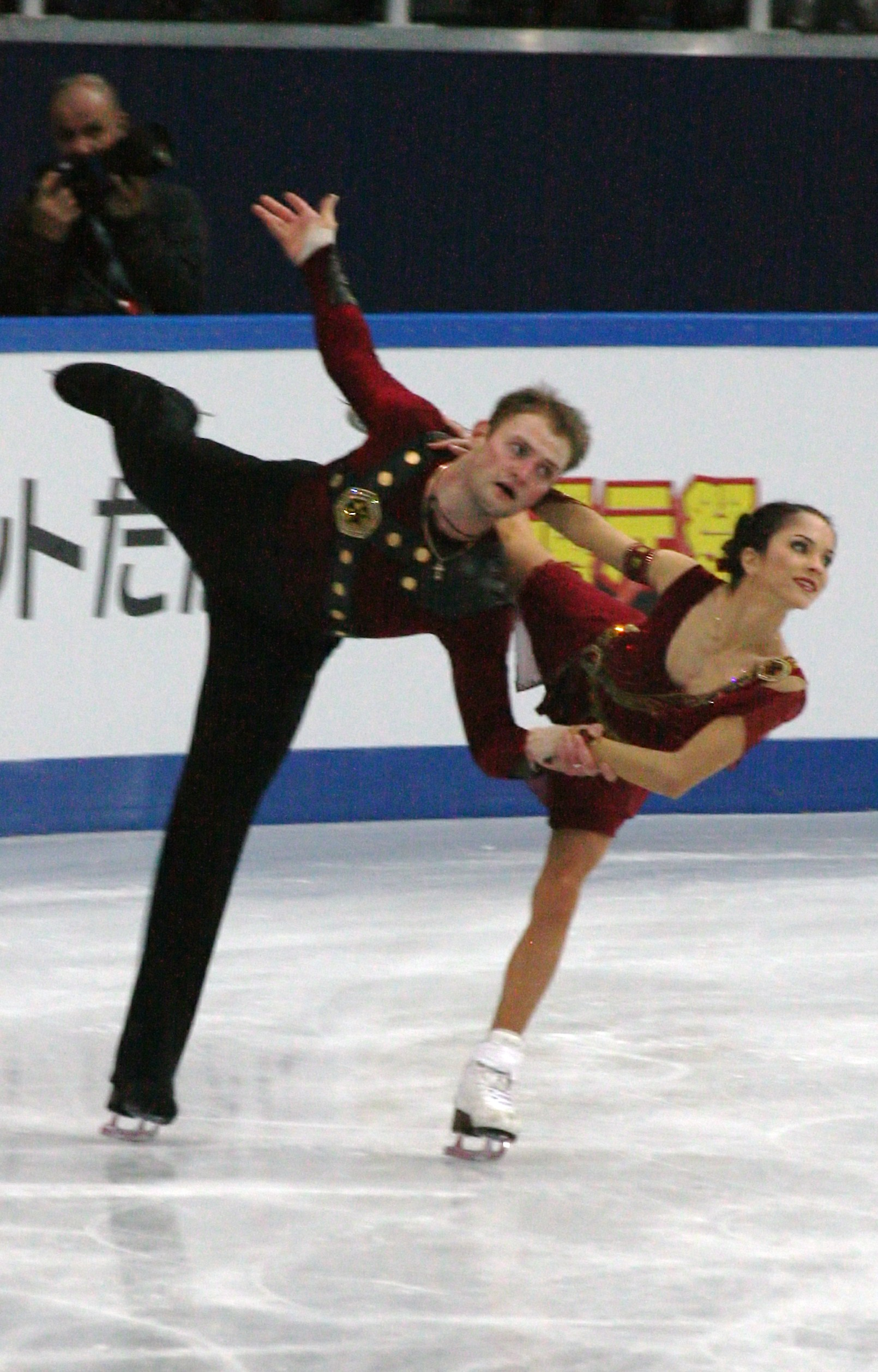
Bazarova/Larionov at the 2012 Grand Prix Final

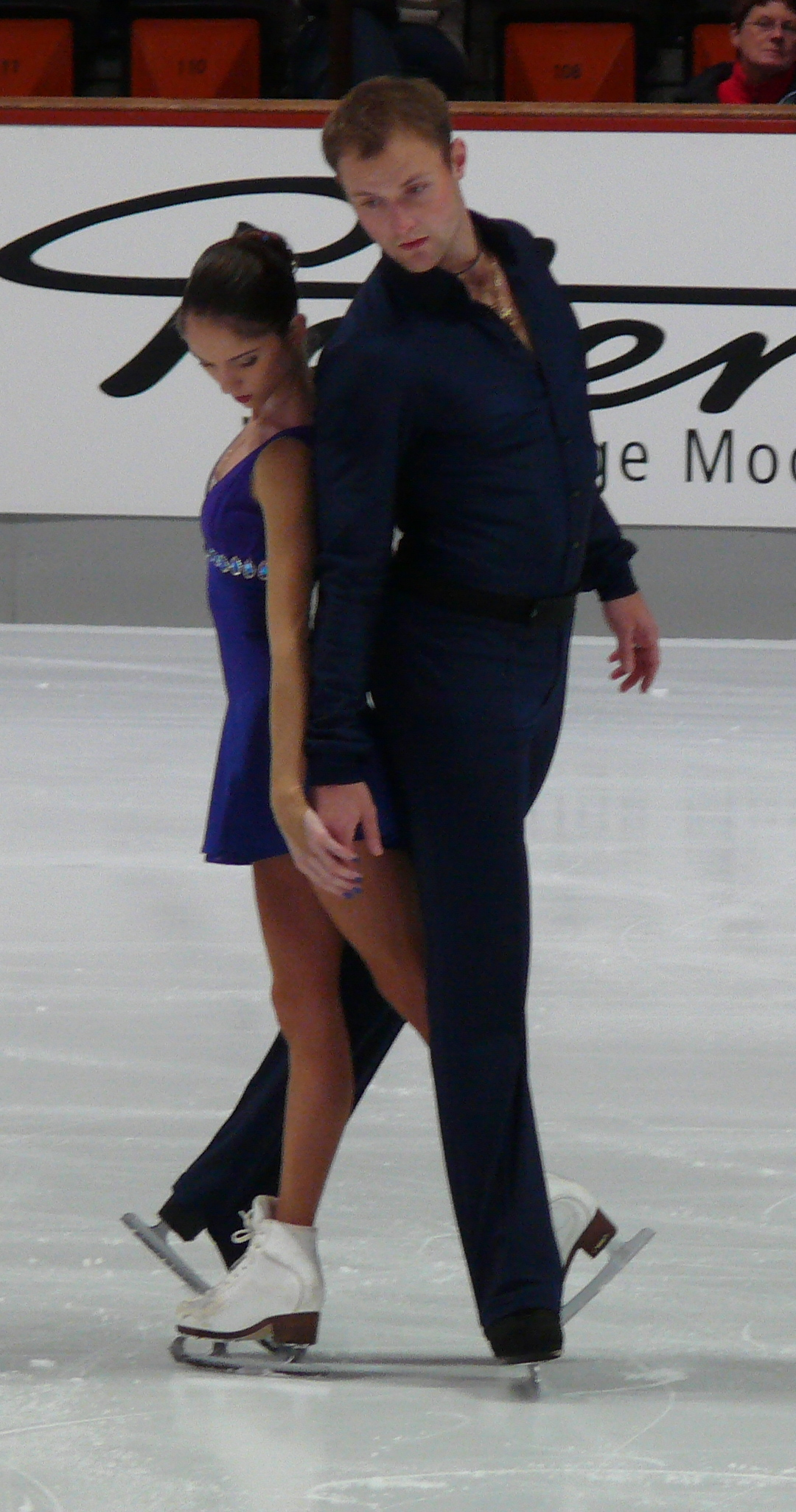
Bazarova/Larionov at the 2012 Nebelhorn Trophy

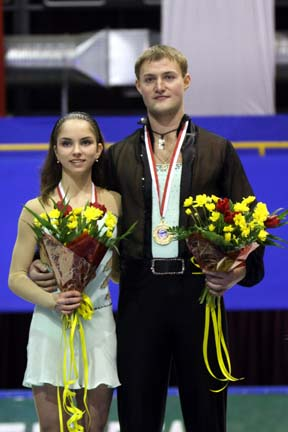
Bazarova/Larionov at the 2007 JGP Final

Small medals for short and free programs awarded only at ISU Championships. At team events, medals awarded for combined team results only.

2013–2014 season
Date	Event	SP	FS	Total
26–27 March 2014	2014 World Championships	7; 67.41	6; 122.03	7; 189.44
11–12 February 2014	2014 Winter Olympics	8; 69.66	6; 129.94	6; 199.60
15–19 January 2014	2014 European Championships	3; 71.70	3; 129.91	3; 201.61
24–26 December 2013	2014 Russian Championships	2; 75.08	1; 138.94	2; 214.02
4–8 December 2013	2013 NRW Trophy	1; 63.05	1; 115.70	1; 178.75
23–24 November 2013	2013 Rostelecom Cup	2; 69.72	2; 131.89	2; 201.61
15–17 November 2013	2013 Trophée Eric Bompard	3; 65.67	5; 114.40	4; 180.07
2012–2013 season
Date	Event	SP	FS	Total
13–15 March 2013	2013 World Championships	7; 61.91	6; 122.81	7; 184.72
6–9 December 2012	2012–13 Grand Prix Final	2; 70.14	1; 131.46	2; 201.60
22–25 November 2012	2012 NHK Trophy	1; 65.61	1; 126.41	1; 192.02
8–11 November 2012	2012 Rostelecom Cup	2; 66.02	2; 125.06	2; 191.08
2011–2012 season
Date	Event	SP	FS	Total
18–22 April 2012	2012 World Team Trophy	2; 62.02	1; 118.68	5T/1P; 180.70
26–30 March 2012	2012 World Championships	4; 65.02	7; 118.66	6; 183.68
25–26 January 2012	2012 European Championships	2; 66.89	2; 126.90	2; 193.79
25–29 December 2011	2012 Russian Championships	1; 68.83	1; 126.03	1; 194.86
18–20 November 2011	2011 Trophée Eric Bompard	3; 59.06	2; 125.85	2; 184.91
21–23 October 2011	2011 Skate America	3; 59.62	5; 114.32	5; 173.94
21–24 September 2011	2011 Nebelhorn Trophy	4; 52.50	2; 112.73	2; 165.23
2010–2011 season
Date	Event	SP	FS	Total
27–28 April 2011	2011 World Championships	4; 64.64	5; 122.49	5; 187.13
26–27 January 2011	2011 European Championships	3; 62.89	3; 125.35	3; 188.24
26–29 December 2010	2011 Russian Championships	3; 67.83	3; 127.94	3; 195.77
9–12 December 2010	2010–11 Grand Prix Final	3; 63.86	5; 112.94	5; 176.80
26–28 November 2010	2010 Trophée Eric Bompard	2; 64.18	2; 118.82	2; 183.00
22–24 October 2010	2010 NHK Trophy	2; 60.16	2; 113.67	2; 173.83
23–26 September 2010	2010 Nebelhorn Trophy	1; 57.30	1; 108.00	1; 165.30
2009–2010 season
Date	Event	SP	FS	Total
23–24 March 2010	2010 World Championships	7; 59.78	7; 112.26	8; 172.04
14–15 February 2010	2010 Winter Olympics	12; 56.54	11; 106.96	11; 163.50
19–20 January 2010	2010 European Championships	5; 55.84	6; 104.00	5; 159.84
23–27 December 2009	2010 Russian Championships	3; 62.26	3; 127.94	3; 195.77
22–25 October 2009	2009 Rostelecom Cup	4; 54.42	3; 101.86	4; 156.28
2007–2008 season
Date	Event	SP	FS	Total
3–7 January 2008	2008 Russian Championships	3; 57.47	6; 91.26	6; 148.73
6–9 December 2007	2007–08 JGP Final	1; 58.45	1; 98.90	DQ 1; 157.35
25–28 October 2007	2007 Skate America	3; 56.76	3; 102.82	3; 159.58
18–21 October 2007	2007 JGP Great Britain	1; 51.85	1; 87.47	1; 139.32
10–13 October 2007	2007 JGP Germany	1; 51.33	2; 77.46	2; 128.79
2006–2007 season
Date	Event	SP	FS	Total
27 Feb. – 4 March 2007	2007 World Junior Championships	2; 55.06	3; 92.25	2; 147.31
1–4 February 2007	2007 Russian Junior Championships	–	–	2; 143.58
4–7 January 2007	2007 Russian Championships	–	–	7; 137.53
7–10 December 2006	2006–07 JGP Final	4; 47.37	8; 77.79	7; 125.16
11–14 October 2006	2006 JGP Taipei	1; 48.95	2; 86.83	2; 135.78
27 Sept. – 1 Oct. 2006	2006 JGP Norway	6; 40.97	3; 75.49	4; 116.46
