= Nodari Maisuradze =

Russian pair skater (born 1988)

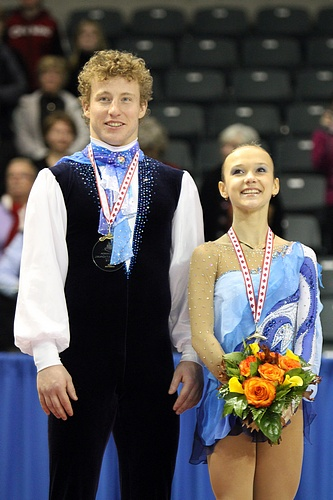
- Maisuradze (left) and Lubov Iliushechkina in 2010

Personal information
- Native name: Нодари Отариевич Маисурадзе
- Born: 18 February 1988 (age 38) Lipetsk, Russian SFSR, Soviet Union
- Height: 1.77 m (5 ft 10 in)

Figure skating career
- Country: Russia
- Partner: Julia Antipova
- Coach: Artur Dmitriev
- Skating club: UOR 4 Moscow
- Began skating: 1992
Medal record
Representing Russia
Figure skating: Pairs
Winter Universiade
Gold medal – first place	2011 Erzurum	Pairs
World Junior Championships
Gold medal – first place	2009 Sofia	Pairs
Silver medal – second place	2008 Sofia	Pairs
Junior Grand Prix Final
Gold medal – first place	2008–09 Goyang City	Pairs

Nodari Otarievich Maisuradze (Russian: Нодари Отариевич Маисурадзе, born 18 February 1988) is a Russian pair skater. With Julia Antipova, he is the 2014 Bavarian Open champion and placed eighth at the 2014 World Championships.

With former partner Lubov Iliushechkina, Maisuradze is the 2010 Skate Canada champion, 2011 Winter Universiade champion, 2009 World Junior champion, 2008 World Junior silver medalist, and 2009 Russian national bronze medalist.

== Personal life ==
Nodari Otarievich Maisuradze was born 18 February 1988 in Lipetsk, Russian SFSR, Soviet Union. He moved to Saint Petersburg when he was 12. On 9 July 2020 he married Russian pair skater Alina Ustimkina.

== Career ==
=== Early years ===
Maisuradze began skating at the age of three-and-a-half in Lipetsk. His first coach was Galina Sukhareva. He began training in Saint Petersburg at age 12 and was taught by Alexei Urmanov for a year.

=== Partnership with Iliushechkina ===
In April 2006, Maisuradze switched from singles to pairs, teaming up with Lubov Iliushechkina. Though initially skeptical, coach Natalia Pavlova decided to work with them because she had no pairs at the time and grew impressed by their commitment. In September of that year, Pavlova moved to Moscow and the pair followed her.

During the 2007–08 season, Iliushechkina/Maisuradze took silver at the 2008 Junior Worlds and placed 4th at the senior Russian Nationals.

During the 2008–09 season, they won the World Junior title, along with gold at the Junior Grand Prix Final. The pair also competed at the senior level, winning the bronze at Russian Nationals and placing 5th at their first European Championships. They earned a berth to 2009 Worlds but were forced to withdraw due to an injury to Maisuradze. He injured ligaments in his hand in a skiing accident. They were replaced by Ksenia Ozerova and Alexander Enbert.

During the 2009–10 season, Iliushechkina/Maisuradze placed third in the short program at 2009 Cup of China and achieved their personal best score of 62.54. However, they struggled in the long program, finishing seventh in that segment, and fifth overall. At Russian Nationals, they also struggled and finished in fourth. After the difficult season, they made some adjustments in training.

Iliushechkina/Maisuradze began the 2010–11 season by capturing the gold at 2010 Skate Canada, their first medal on the senior Grand Prix circuit. Only a week later, they competed at the 2010 Cup of China and placed 4th. Their results qualified them for their first Grand Prix Final at the senior level. They finished fourth, setting new personal bests in the long program (117.38) and combined total (177.44). At the 2011 Russian Nationals, they placed sixth in the short program and fourth in the long, to finish fifth overall. They were named to the 2011 Winter Universiade team but missed the European and World teams. Iliushechkina/Maisuradze won the gold medal at the Winter Universiade.

In the 2011–12 season, Iliushechkina/Maisuradze competed at 2011 Skate Canada, where they placed 5th, and 2011 NHK Trophy, where they finished 6th. They were 6th at the 2012 Russian Championships. In March 2012, their coach, Natalia Pavlova, confirmed that their partnership had ended.

=== Partnership with Antipova ===
Maisuradze began training with Julia Antipova in July 2012. They placed fourth at the 2013 Russian Championships and then won silver in their international debut at the 2013 Bavarian Open. Natalia Pavlova and Artur Dmitriev jointly coached the pair in their first season together.

In the summer of 2013, Antipova/Maisuradze lost some training time due to injury and their search for a new coaching situation. The Russian federation having decided they would stay in the short term with Dmitriev, the pair returned to training in early August, working with Dmitriev separately from his and Pavlova's main group. Antipova/Maisuradze placed fifth at their sole Grand Prix assignment, the 2013 Rostelecom Cup. In the free skate, they executed a quadruple twist, their first in competition. After placing fourth again at the Russian Championships, the pair won their first international, the 2014 Bavarian Open, and were assigned to the 2014 World Championships after Tatiana Volosozhar / Maxim Trankov decided to miss the event. Making their World debut, the pair finished eighth in Saitama, Japan.

Antipova/Maisuradze decided to remain with Dmitriev in the 2014–15 season. They were chosen to compete at the 2014 Cup of China and 2014 NHK Trophy.

== Programs ==
=== With Antipova ===
Season	Short program	Free skating	Exhibition
2013–2014	Beethoven's Five Secrets by The Piano Guys	Money; The Great Gig in the Sky by Pink Floyd; Back in Black by AC/DC	Maybe I, Maybe You by the Scorpions
2012–2013	Kalinka	Take Five; Hit the Road Jack	

=== With Iliushechkina ===
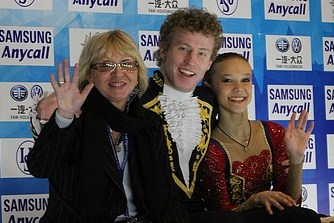
Iliushechkina and Maisuradze with coach Natalia Pavlova

Season	Short program	Free skating	Exhibition
2011–2012	Figaro (from The Barber of Seville) by Gioachino Rossini (modern arrangement)	A Chorus Line by Marvin Hamlisch	
2010–2011	Figaro (from The Barber of Seville) by Gioachino Rossini (modern arrangement)	Conquest of Paradise by Vangelis	La Comédie by unknown
2009–2010	Yesterday by The Beatles	Conquest of Paradise by Vangelis	La Comédie by unknown
2008–2009	Prologue by Loreena McKennitt	Music by Edvin Marton	We Are the Champions by Queen
2007–2008	The Gadfly by Dmitri Shostakovich	ABBA medley	We Are the Champions by Queen

== Competitive highlights ==
GP: Grand Prix; JGP: Junior Grand Prix

=== With Antipova ===
International
Event	2012–13	2013–14	2014–15
Worlds		8th	
GP Cup of China			WD
GP NHK Trophy			WD
GP Rostelecom Cup		5th	
Bavarian Open	2nd	1st	
Cup of Nice		4th	
National
Russian Champ.	4th	4th	

=== With Iliushechkina ===
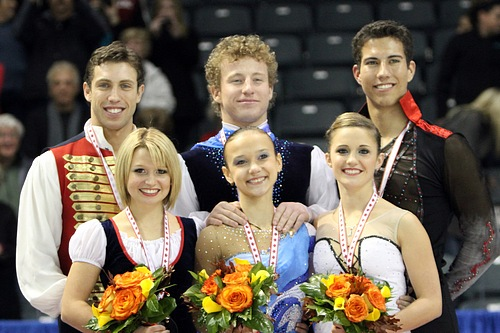
Iliushechkina and Maisuradze on the podium at 2010 Skate Canada

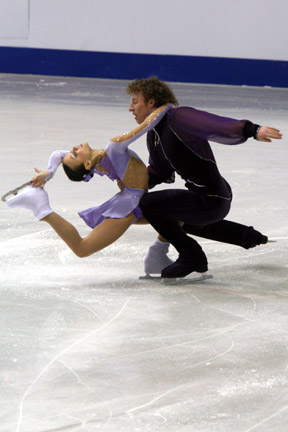
Iliushechkina and Maisuradze at 2008 Junior Worlds

International
Event	2007–08	2008–09	2009–10	2010–11	2011–12
Europeans		5th			
Grand Prix Final				4th	
GP Cup of China			5th	4th	
GP Cup of Russia		4th			
GP NHK Trophy					6th
GP Skate Canada				1st	5th
Golden Spin			1st		
Nepela Memorial					3rd
Universiade				1st	
International: Junior
Junior Worlds	2nd	1st			
JGP Final		1st			
JGP Belarus		1st			
JGP Czech Rep.		1st			
National
Russian Champ.	4th	3rd	4th	5th	6th
Russian Junior	2nd				
