= Sergei Voronov (figure skater) =

Russian figure skater (born 1987)

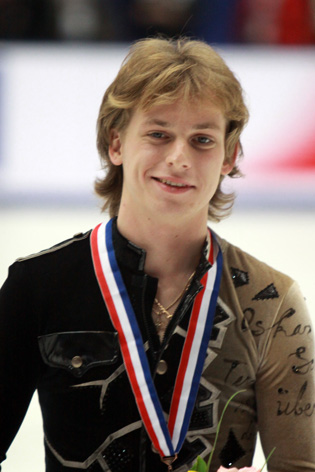
- Voronov in 2009

Personal information
- Born: 3 October 1987 (age 39) Moscow, Russian SFSR, Soviet Union
- Height: 1.76 m (5 ft 9 1/2 in)

Figure skating career
- Country: Russia
- Coach: Inna Goncharenko
- Skating club: CSKA Moscow, Sambo 70
- Began skating: 1991
- Retired: 11 September 2020
Medal record
Representing Russia
Figure skating: Men's singles
Grand Prix Final
Bronze medal – third place	2014–15 Barcelona	Men's singles
European Championships
Silver medal – second place	2014 Budapest	Men's singles
Bronze medal – third place	2015 Stockholm	Men's singles
World Team Trophy
Silver medal – second place	2015 Tokyo	Team
Russian Championships
Gold medal – first place	2008 Saint Petersburg	Men's singles
Gold medal – first place	2009 Kazan	Men's singles
Silver medal – second place	2010 Saint Petersburg	Men's singles
Silver medal – second place	2013 Sochi	Men's singles
Silver medal – second place	2015 Sochi	Men's singles
Bronze medal – third place	2012 Saransk	Men's singles
Bronze medal – third place	2014 Sochi	Men's singles
World Junior Championships
Silver medal – second place	2006 Ljubljana	Men's singles
Bronze medal – third place	2007 Oberstdorf	Men's singles

Sergei Evgenyevich Voronov (Russian: Сергей Евгеньевич Воронов; born 3 October 1987) is a retired Russian figure skater. He is the 2017 ISU Grand Prix NHK Trophy winner, a two-time European medalist (2014 silver, 2015 bronze), the 2014–15 Grand Prix Final bronze medalist, a two-time World Junior medalist (2006 silver, 2007 bronze), and a two-time Russian national champion (2008, 2009).

== Personal life ==
Voronov was born in 1987 in Moscow. The International Skating Union gives October as his month of birth, while the Russian skating federation lists November.

== Career ==
=== Early years ===
Voronov began skating in 1991. He broke his collarbone two years later while skating. He was coached by Rafael Arutyunyan in Moscow until 2000, when Arutyunyan moved to the U.S. Voronov decided to move to Saint Petersburg, where he was coached by Galina Kashina for two years and then switched to Alexei Urmanov.

=== 2004 to 2008 ===
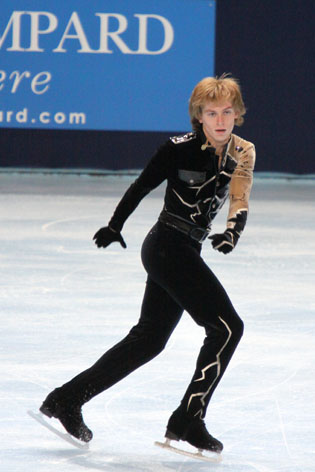
Voronov at the 2009 Trophee Eric Bompard

Voronov withdrew from the 2005 World Junior Championships after the qualifying round due to an injury which kept him off the ice for three months. He had placed sixth in the qualifying round.

Voronov withdrew from the 2007 Skate Canada International before the event due to a recurring foot injury. He placed fourth in the free skate at the 2008 World Championships and finished 7th overall.

=== 2009–10 season ===
In the 2009–10 season, Voronov was assigned to the 2009 Cup of China, where he took bronze, and 2009 Trophée Eric Bompard, where he was sixth. He won the silver medal at the 2010 Russian national championships. Voronov was sent to Europeans but his 14th-place result led Russia to assign the country's second men's spot at the Olympics and Worlds to Russian national bronze medalist Artem Borodulin (along with Evgeni Plushenko). Plushenko's withdrawal from the 2010 World Championships due to injury allowed Voronov to be called up as a late replacement. Voronov would place 14th. This placement, along with Borodulin's withdrawal during the competition, meant Russia would have one men's berth to the 2011 World Championships. At the end of the season, he left coach Alexei Urmanov and moved back to Moscow to be coached by Nikolai Morozov.

=== 2010–11 season ===
For the 2010–11 season, Voronov was assigned to the 2010 Cup of China and the 2010 Trophée Eric Bompard. He was injured during the short program at Cup of China and withdrew from the event and from Trophee Bompard. He competed at Russian Nationals where he placed 10th in the short program, 3rd in the long, and 4th overall, just 0.27 points off the podium.

=== 2011–12 season ===
Voronov finished 17th at the 2012 World Championships in Nice, France. He withdrew from the 2012 World Team Trophy due to an ankle fracture which he sustained in Nice.

=== 2012–13 season ===
Voronov won the bronze medal at the 2012 Cup of China, his third Grand Prix medal. He finished 7th at the 2012 NHK Trophy and won the silver medal at the 2013 Russian Championships. On 4 April 2013, Morozov confirmed that Voronov had left his group.

=== 2013–14 season ===
Voronov joined Eteri Tutberidze and Sergei Dudakov. In the 2013–14 season, he won silver at his first event, the 2013 Finlandia Trophy, and finished ninth at his sole Grand Prix event, the 2013 NHK Trophy. After winning the gold medal at the 2013 Golden Spin of Zagreb, Voronov took bronze at the 2014 Russian Championships. Appearing in his sixth European Championships, he won the silver medal with a new Personal Best overall score of 252.55 points.

=== 2014–15 season ===
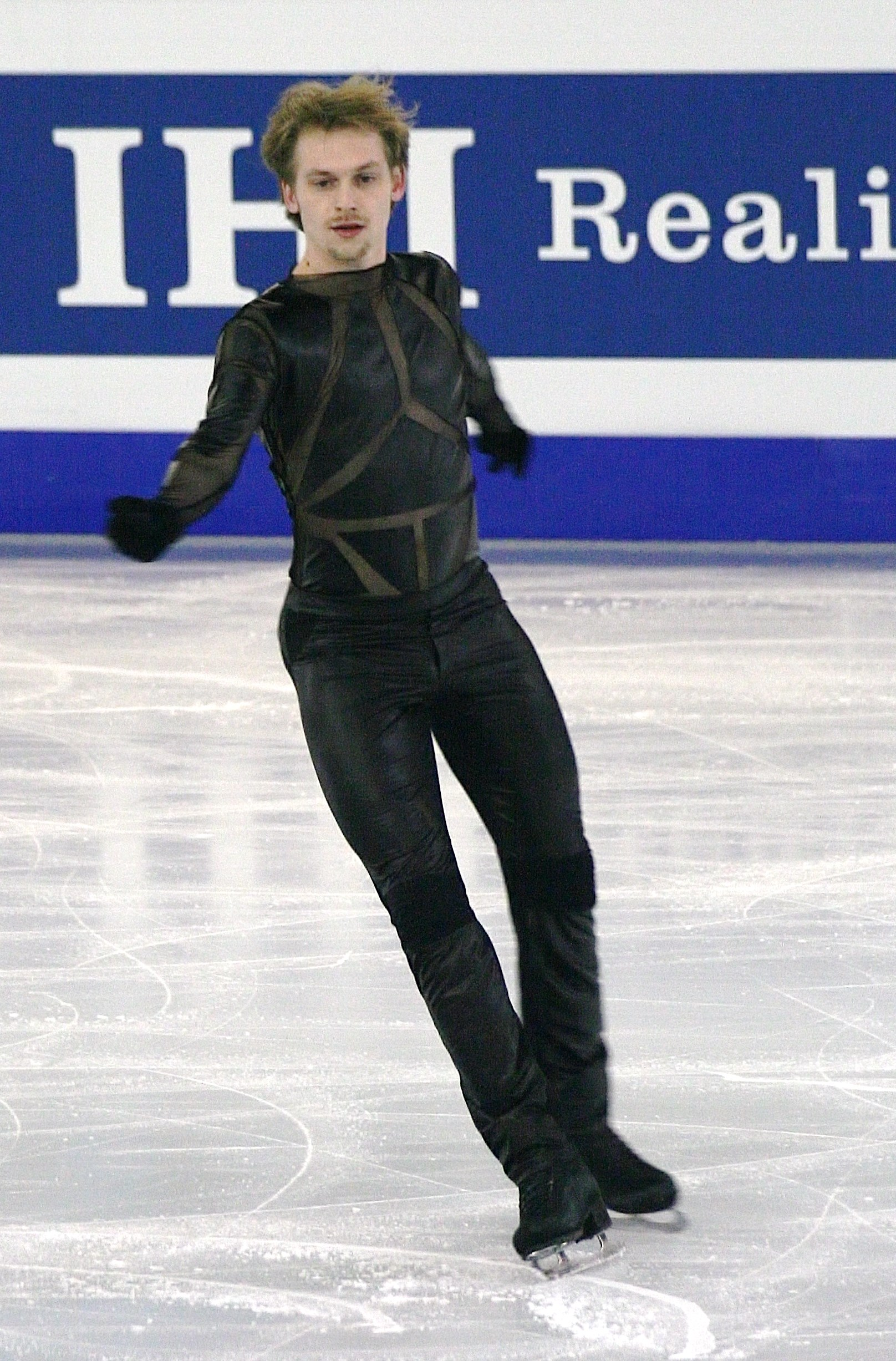
Voronov at the 2014–15 Grand Prix Final

In the 2014–15 season, Voronov's first assignment was the 2014 Rostelecom Cup; he won the silver medal, behind Spain's Javier Fernández. After taking silver at the 2014 NHK Trophy, he qualified to his first Grand Prix Final. At the Final, he was awarded the bronze medal behind gold medalist Yuzuru Hanyu and silver medalist Fernández.

Voronov won silver at the 2015 Russian Championships behind Maxim Kovtun and was sent to the 2015 European Championships, where he took bronze behind Fernandez (gold) and Kovtun (silver). With that, he ranked second in the ISU World Standings for men's singles with 3839 points, behind Yuzuru Hanyu. Voronov competed at the 2015 World Championships in Shanghai with an aggravated knee injury. He placed fourth in the short program, 17th in the long, and 13th overall.

=== 2015–16 season ===
Voronov placed fifth at the 2015 Cup of China, sixth at the 2015 Rostelecom Cup, and fifth at the 2016 Russian Championships. He received no ISU Championship assignment but was invited to the 2016 Team Challenge Cup to compete as a member of Team Europe. His team finished second to North America.

Voronov changed coaches in spring 2016, joining Inna Goncharenko.

=== 2016–17 season ===
In October 2016 Voronov won the gold medal at the 2016 CS Ondrej Nepela Memorial. In his Grand Prix events, he placed 4th at the 2016 Skate America and 3rd at the 2016 Cup of China.

At the 2017 Russian Championships Voronov finished 7th.

=== 2017–18 season ===
Before his Grand Prix series events Voronov competed in two Challenger events. His first event was 2017 CS Ondrej Nepela Trophy where he won the silver medal behind his teammate Mikhail Kolyada. He then skated at the 2017 CS Minsk-Arena Ice Star where he won the gold medal.

In November 2017 Voronov won his first Grand Prix series gold medal when he won the 2017 NHK Trophy with a personal best score of 271.12 points. He then won the bronze medal at the 2017 Skate America. These results qualified him to the 2017–18 Grand Prix Final where he placed 4th after placing 5th in the short program and 5th in the free skate.

In December 2017 Voronov placed 4th at the 2018 Russian Championships after placing 4th in the short program and 3rd in the free skate.

=== 2018–19 season ===
Voronov started his season in mid-September by competing at the 2018 CS Ondrej Nepela Trophy, where he won the silver medal behind his teammate Mikhail Kolyada. In October Voronov won the bronze medal at the 2018 Skate America. In early November Voronov competed at his second Grand Prix event, the 2018 NHK Trophy. He was ranked second in both programs and won the silver medal behind Shoma Uno. With one silver medal and one bronze medal he qualified for the 2018–19 Grand Prix Final, where he finished sixth.

Voronov's season ended prematurely when an injury compelled him to withdraw from the Russian Championships.

=== 2019–20 season ===
Voronov began the season with a sixth-place finish at the 2019 CS Finlandia Trophy. At his first Grand Prix assignment, the 2019 Internationaux de France, he placed sixth as well. Voronov finished fourth at the 2019 NHK Trophy, and ninth at the 2020 Russian Championships.

On 11 September 2020 Voronov announced his retirement from competitive figure skating.

=== Post-competitive career ===
Voronov briefly coached Evgenia Tarasova / Vladimir Morozov for the duration of the 2020–21 figure skating season. In the fall of 2021, he was invited by Oksana Ten, the then Vice President of the National Skating Federation of the Republic of Kazakhstan and mother of the late Denis Ten, to become head coach of the Kazakhstan figure skating team at the Denis Ten Academy. Among his students included Dias Jirenbayev.

Voronov eventually resigned from his position and became the senior coach of the Belarusian national team in June 2023. After one year, however, it was announced that Voronov had returned to Moscow to coach at the Tchaikovsky Konyok Skating School.

== Programs ==
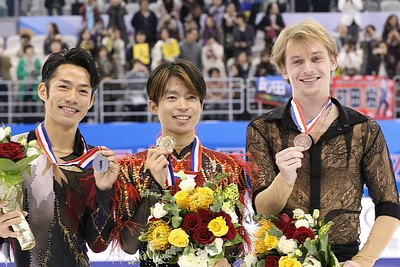
Voronov with the other medalists at the 2012 Cup of China

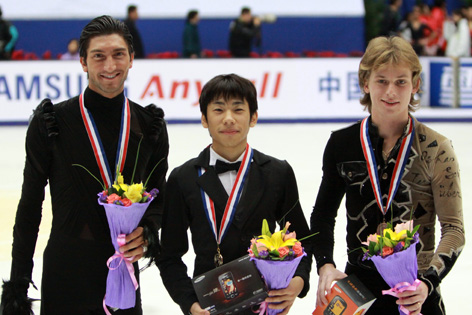
Voronov with the other medalists at the 2009 Cup of China

Season	Short program	Free skating	Exhibition
2019–2020	Somebody to Love by Queen choreo. by Anna Bilibina, Dmitri Soloviev	I Belong To You by Muse choreo. by Anna Bilibina, Dmitri Soloviev	
2018–2019	Appassionata by Secret Garden choreo. by Artur Gachinski and Maxim Zavozin	Way Down We Go by Kaleo choreo. by Denis Ten	
2017–2018	Tango by Astor Piazzolla choreo. by Misha Ge	Sarabande Suite (Aeternae) by Globus choreo. by Misha Ge	Autumn Leaves by Joseph Kosma, Johnny Mercer performed by Pat Boone
2016–2017	The Skin I Live In (soundtrack) by Alberto Iglesias	Exogenesis: Symphony Part 3 by Muse choreo. by Nikolai Morozov	Can't Take My Eyes Off You by Frankie Valli
2015–2016	Butterflies and Hurricanes by Muse choreo. by Jeffrey Buttle	Caruso by Neal Schon; Come Together by Marcus Miller; At Last by Kenny G; Big Time Boppin' (Go Man Go) by Big Bad Voodoo Daddy choreo. by Alexander Zhulin; Once Upon a Time in America by Ennio Morricone: Cockeye's Song; Speakeasy; Deborah's Theme choreo. by Jeffrey Buttle	That's All by DDT; Feeling Good performed by Michael Bublé
2014–2015	Danse macabre by Camille Saint-Saëns choreo. by Alexander Zhulin	Caruso by Neal Schon; Come Together by Marcus Miller; At Last by Kenny G; Big Time Boppin' (Go Man Go) by Big Bad Voodoo Daddy choreo. by Alexander Zhulin	My Way; Can't Take My Eyes Off You by Frank Sinatra; Ave Maria performed by Thomas Spencer-Wortley; Fastidious Horses by Vladimir Vysotsky; Hier encore by Charles Aznavour
2013–2014	Two Guitars choreo. by Irina Zhuk	A Los Amigos by Armando Pontier; Por Una Cabeza by Carlos Gardel; Tanguera by Mariano Mores choreo. by Ilia Averbukh	Ave Maria performed by Thomas Spencer-Wortley; Without a Fight by Okean Elzy
2012–2013	Yablochko (Russian Sailor Dance) by Reinhold Glière	Romeo and Juliet by Nino Rota	You Are The Light There (You) by Alla Pugacheva; El Tango de Roxanne (from Moulin Rouge!) by Craig Armstrong
2011–2012	The Final Game (from A League Of Their Own) by Hans Zimmer	Pagliacci by Ruggero Leoncavallo	Poka Gorit Svecha (from Nachni Snachala) by Mashina Vremeni
2010–2011	Tango de Roxanne (from Moulin Rouge!)	Piano Concerto No. 2 by Sergei Rachmaninoff	Romeo and Juliet by Nino Rota; Piano Concerto No. 2 by Sergei Rachmaninoff
2009–2010	Revolution Etude by Alexander Scriabin	Schindler's List by John Williams; Allegretto by Karl Jenkins	Romeo and Juliet by Nino Rota
2008–2009	The Godfather by Nino Rota	Tango by Astor Piazzolla	Romeo and Juliet by Nino Rota
2007–2008	Piano Concerto No. 2 by Sergei Rachmaninoff	Tango by Astor Piazzolla	Still Loving You by The Scorpions
2006–2007	Piano Concerto No. 2 by Sergei Rachmaninoff	Pearl Harbor by Hans Zimmer	Still Loving You by The Scorpions
2004–2006	BIR by Bruno Nule	Variations; The Phantom of the Opera on Ice by Robert Danova	Yesterday by The Beatles

== Competitive highlights ==
GP: Grand Prix; CS: Challenger Series; JGP: Junior Grand Prix

International
Event	04–05	05–06	06–07	07–08	08–09	09–10	10–11	11–12	12–13	13–14	14–15	15–16	16–17	17–18	18–19	19–20
Worlds			19th	7th	13th	14th		17th			13th					
Europeans				4th	9th	14th		10th	7th	2nd	3rd					
GP Final											3rd			4th	6th	
GP Cup of China						3rd	WD		3rd			5th	3rd			
GP France				2nd		6th										6th
GP NHK Trophy									7th	9th	2nd			1st	2nd	4th
GP Rostelecom					7th			7th			2nd	6th				
GP Skate America			7th										4th	3rd	3rd	
GP Skate Canada			10th	WD	6th											
CS Finlandia											1st	3rd				6th
CS Minsk-Arena														1st		
CS Nebelhorn											4th					
CS Nepela Trophy													1st	2nd	2nd	
Universiade			5th				2nd									
Cup of Nice							WD									
Finlandia			6th		3rd	2nd				2nd						
Golden Spin										1st						
Ice Star										1st						
NRW Trophy						5th						3rd				
International: Junior
Junior Worlds	WD	2nd	3rd													
JGP Bulgaria		3rd														
JGP Hungary	3rd															
JGP Japan		3rd														
JGP Ukraine	6th															
National
Russian	6th	6th	6th	1st	1st	2nd	4th	3rd	2nd	3rd	2nd	5th	7th	4th	WD	9th
Russian Junior	2nd	2nd	1st													
Team events
World Team; Trophy					5th T 7th P						2nd T 5th P					
Team Challenge; Cup												2nd T 8th P				

== Detailed results ==
Small medals for short and free programs awarded only at ISU Championships. At team events, medals awarded for team results only.

2019–20 season
Date	Event	SP	FS	Total
24–29 December 2019	2020 Russian Championships	9; 79.61	8; 154.21	9; 233.82
22–24 November 2019	2019 NHK Trophy	3; 88.63	6; 150.42	4; 239.05
1–3 November 2019	2019 Internationaux de France	7; 76.60	7; 144.38	6; 220.98
11–13 October 2019	2019 CS Finlandia Trophy	4; 79.48	9; 126.71	6; 206.19
2018–19 season
Date	Event	SP	FS	Total
6–9 December 2018	2018–19 Grand Prix Final	5; 82.96	6; 143.48	6; 226.44
9–11 November 2018	2018 NHK Trophy	2; 91.37	2; 162.91	2; 254.28
19–21 October 2018	2018 Skate America	4; 78.18	4; 148.26	3; 226.44
19–22 September 2018	2018 CS Ondrej Nepela Trophy	2; 81.77	2; 157.96	2; 239.73
2017–18 season
Date	Event	SP	FS	Total
21–24 December 2017	2018 Russian Championships	4; 90.23	3; 155.65	4; 245.88
7–10 December 2017	2017–18 Grand Prix Final	5; 87.77	4; 178.82	4; 266.59
24–26 November 2017	2017 Skate America	3; 87.51	3; 169.98	3; 257.49
10–12 November 2017	2017 NHK Trophy	1; 90.06	1; 181.06	1; 271.12
26–29 October 2017	2017 CS Minsk-Arena Ice Star	1; 78.75	1; 171.35	1; 250.10
21–23 September 2017	2017 CS Ondrej Nepela Trophy	1; 80.85	2; 153.22	2; 234.07
2016–17 season
Date	Event	SP	FS	Total
20–26 December 2016	2017 Russian Championships	3; 85.89	8; 147.73	7; 233.62
18–20 November 2016	2016 Cup of China	4; 82.93	4; 160.83	3; 243.76
21–23 October 2016	2016 Skate America	5; 78.68	5; 166.60	4; 245.28
30 September – 2 October 2016	2016 CS Ondrej Nepela Memorial	1; 80.21	1; 157.21	1; 237.42
2015–16 season
Date	Event	SP	FS	Total
22–24 April 2016	2016 Team Challenge Cup	9; 62.55	8; 132.79	2^{T}
24–27 December 2015	2016 Russian Championships	9; 76.29	5; 161.39	5; 237.68
24–29 November 2015	2015 NRW Trophy	1; 84.53	3; 139.42	3; 223.95
20–22 November 2015	2015 Rostelecom Cup	4; 84.17	7; 160.43	6; 244.60
6–8 November 2015	2015 Cup of China	3; 80.99	8; 141.18	5; 222.17
9–11 October 2015	2015 CS Finlandia Trophy	1; 79.06	7; 134.28	3; 213.34
2014–15 season
Date	Event	SP	FS	Total
16–19 April 2015	2015 World Team Trophy	5; 79.09	5; 161.92	5; 241.01
23–29 March 2015	2015 World Championships	4; 84.70	17; 133.71	13; 218.41
26 January – 1 February 2015	2015 European Championships	2; 81.06	3; 151.99	3; 233.05
24–27 December 2014	2015 Russian Championships	3; 91.24	1; 179.29	2; 270.53
11–14 December 2014	2014–15 Grand Prix Final	4; 84.48	3; 160.05	3; 244.53
28–30 November 2014	2014 NHK Trophy	4; 78.93	2; 157.72	2; 236.65
14–16 November 2014	2014 Rostelecom Cup	2; 90.33	2; 161.67	2; 252.00
9–12 October 2014	2014 CS Finlandia Trophy	1; 75.06	2; 146.05	1; 221.11
24–27 September 2014	2014 CS Nebelhorn Trophy	4; 71.29	4; 138.76	4; 210.05
2013–14 season
Date	Event	SP	FS	Total
15–19 January 2014	2014 European Championships	2; 85.51	2; 167.04	2; 252.55
24–27 December 2013	2014 Russian Championships	3; 89.10	3; 160.34	3; 249.44
5–8 December 2013	2013 Golden Spin of Zagreb	1; 81.64	1; 163.43	1; 245.07
8–10 November 2013	2013 NHK Trophy	6; 79.80	9; 141.38	9; 221.18
18–20 October 2013	2013 Ice Star	1; 82.70	1; 161.60	1; 244.30
4–6 October 2013	2013 Finlandia Trophy	2; 79.74	2; 161.63	2; 241.37
2012–13 season
Date	Event	SP	FS	Total
23–27 January 2013	2013 European Championships	5; 78.38	7; 131.80	7; 210.18
25–28 December 2012	2013 Russian Championships	2; 87.69	2; 166.37	2; 254.06
22–25 November 2012	2012 NHK Trophy	7; 70.03	7; 144.85	7; 214.88
2–4 November 2012	2012 Cup of China	3; 73.58	3; 144.03	3; 217.61
2011–12 season
Date	Event	SP	FS	Total
26 March – 1 April 2012	2012 World Championships	17; 66.81	15; 143.23	17; 210.04
23–29 January 2012	2012 European Championships	14; 60.88	10; 135.01	10; 195.89
25–29 December 2011	2012 Russian Championships	5; 76.35	3; 164.44	3; 240.79
24–27 November 2011	2011 Rostelecom Cup	8; 61.15	6; 136.04	7; 197.19
2010–11 season
Date	Event	SP	FS	Total
1–5 February 2011	2011 Universiade	3; 71.98	2; 132.56	2; 204.54
26–29 December 2010	2011 Russian Championships	13; 60.14	3; 144.57	4; 204.71
2009–10 season
Date	Event	SP	FS	Total
22–28 March 2010	2010 World Championships	11; 73.42	14; 127.18	14; 200.60
18–24 January 2010	2010 European Championships	17; 60.27	12; 125.11	14; 185.38
22–27 December 2009	2010 Russian Championships	2; 95.64	4; 144.37	2; 240.01
29 October – 1 November 2009	2009 Cup of China	2; 81.40	3; 138.99	3; 220.39
15–18 October 2009	2009 Trophée Éric Bompard	4; 72.80	6; 131.65	6; 204.45
8–11 October 2009	2009 Finlandia Trophy	3; 68.50	1; 141.72	2; 210.22
2008–09 season
Date	Event	SP	FS	Total
15–19 April 2009	2009 World Team Trophy	4; 71.42	8; 125.28	5T/7P; 196.70
23–29 March 2009	2009 World Championships	9; 72.15	14; 129.89	13; 202.04
20–25 January 2009	2009 European Championships	6; 71.29	13; 113.67	9; 184.96
24–28 December 2008	2009 Russian Championships	1	1	1; 238.68
20–23 November 2008	2008 Cup of Russia	12; 58.50	6; 131.81	7; 190.31
30 October – 2 November 2008	2008 Skate Canada	5; 70.45	5; 131.14	6; 201.59
9–12 October 2008	2008 Finlandia Trophy	5; 65.95	1; 134.57	3; 200.52
2007–08 season
Date	Event	SP	FS	Total
16–23 March 2008	2008 World Championships	15; 65.26	4; 144.67	7; 209.93
21–27 January 2008	2008 European Championships	6; 64.26	3; 145.87	4; 210.13
3–7 January 2008	2008 Russian Championships	1	1	1; 231.07
15–18 November 2007	2007 Trophée Éric Bompard	4; 68.70	2; 140.21	2; 208.91
2006–07 season
Date	Event	SP	FS	Total
20–25 March 2007	2007 World Championships	22; 60.50	19; 116.07	19; 176.57
17–27 January 2007	2007 Universiade	6; 61.01	4; 123.21	5; 184.22
4–7 January 2007	2007 Russian Championships	4	7	6; 195.30
2–5 November 2006	2006 Skate Canada	9; 58.35	9; 107.38	10; 165.73
26–29 October 2006	2006 Skate America	9; 56.40	4; 116.63	7; 173.03
6–8 October 2006	2006 Finlandia Trophy	7; 47.84	5; 110.13	6; 157.97
