= 2014 Russian Figure Skating Championships =

- Type: National championship
- Date: 24–27 December 2013 (S); 22–25 January 2014 (J)
- Season: 2013–14
- Location: Sochi (S); Saransk (J)
- Host: Figure Skating Federation of Russia
- Venue: Iceberg Skating Palace

Champions
- Men's singles: Maxim Kovtun (S); Adian Pitkeev (J)
- Ladies' singles: Adelina Sotnikova (S); Serafima Sakhanovich (J)
- Pairs: Ksenia Stolbova / Fedor Klimov (S); Evgenia Tarasova / Vladimir Morozov (J)
- Ice dance: Ekaterina Bobrova / Dmitri Soloviev (S); Alexandra Stepanova / Ivan Bukin (J)
- Previous: 2013 Russian Championships
- Next: 2015 Russian Championships

The 2014 Russian Figure Skating Championships (Russian: Чемпионат России по фигурному катанию на коньках 2014) was held from 24–27 December 2013 in Sochi. Medals were awarded in the disciplines of men's singles, ladies' singles, pair skating, and ice dancing. The results were among the criteria used to select Russia's teams sent to the 2014 Winter Olympics, the 2014 World Championships, and the 2014 European Championships.

== Competitions ==
Date	Event	Type	Location
22–27 December 2013	2014 Russian Championships	Final	Sochi, Krasnodar Krai
22–25 January 2014	2014 Russian Junior Championships	Final	Saransk, Mordovia
26 February – 2 March 2014	2014 Russian Cup Final	Final	Veliky Novgorod, Novgorod Oblast
21–25 March 2014	2014 Russian Youth Championships – Younger Age	Final	Stary Oskol, Belgorod Oblast
2–5 April 2014	2014 Russian Youth Championships – Elder Age	Final	Nizhny Novgorod, Nizhny Novgorod Oblast

== Medalists of most important competitions ==
Senior Championships
Discipline	Gold	Silver	Bronze
Men	Maxim Kovtun	Evgeni Plushenko	Sergei Voronov
Ladies	Adelina Sotnikova	Yulia Lipnitskaya	Elena Radionova
Pairs	Ksenia Stolbova / Fedor Klimov	Vera Bazarova / Yuri Larionov	Maria Vigalova / Egor Zakroev
Ice dancing	Ekaterina Bobrova / Dmitri Soloviev	Elena Ilinykh / Nikita Katsalapov	Victoria Sinitsina / Ruslan Zhiganshin
Junior Championships
Discipline	Gold	Silver	Bronze
Men	Adian Pitkeev	Alexander Petrov	Moris Kvitelashvili
Ladies	Serafima Sakhanovich	Maria Sotskova	Alexandra Proklova
Pairs	Evgenia Tarasova / Vladimir Morozov	Maria Vigalova / Egor Zakroev	Vasilisa Davankova / Andrei Deputat
Ice dancing	Alexandra Stepanova / Ivan Bukin	Anna Yanovskaya / Sergey Mozgov	Betina Popova / Yuri Vlasenko
Cup Final
Discipline	Gold	Silver	Bronze
Men	Moris Kvitelashvili	Gordei Gorshkov	Andrei Lazukin
Ladies	Anna Pogorilaya	Evgenia Medvedeva	Maria Artemieva
Pairs	Julia Antipova / Nodari Maisuradze	Katarina Gerboldt / Alexander Enbert	Kristina Astakhova / Maxim Kurdyukov
Ice dancing	Valeria Zenkova / Valerie Sinitsin	Svetlana Khomiakova / Nikita Shubo-Yablonski	Daria Scheglova / Anton Novikov
Junior men	Alexander Samarin	Alexey Genya	Igor Efimchuk
Junior ladies	Polina Tsurskaya	Anastasia Kolomiets	Viktoria Bezrukova
Junior pairs	Vasilisa Davankova / Andrei Deputat	Anastasia A. Gubanova / Alexei Sintsov	Anastasia Kholkina / Vladimir Arkhipov
Junior ice dancing	Alla Loboda / Pavel Drozd	Eva Khachaturian / Igor Eremenko	Ksenia Konkina / Georgy Reviya
Youth Championships – Elder Age
Discipline	Gold	Silver	Bronze
Men	Alexander Samarin	Dmitri Aliev	Daniil Bernadiner
Ladies	Polina Drynkina	Anastasia Kolomiets	Diana Pervushkina
Pairs	Anastasia A. Gubanova / Alexei Sintsov	Maria Chuzhanova / Denis Mintsev	Anastasia Poluianova / Stepan Korotkov
Ice dancing	Anastasia Shpilevaya / Grigory Smirnov	Anastasia Khromova / Yuriy Karasev	Sofia Polishchuk / Alexander Vakhnov
Youth Championships – Younger Age
Discipline	Gold	Silver	Bronze
Men	Petr Gumennik	Nikolai Gerasimov	Pavel Yuferov
Ladies	Polina Tsurskaya	Viktoria Bezrukova	Anastasiia Gubanova
Pairs	No pairs' discipline		
Ice dancing	No Ice dancing discipline		

== Senior Championships ==
The senior Championships were held in Sochi for the second year in a row. Anastasia Martiusheva / Alexei Rogonov withdrew before the event due to injury and were replaced by alternates Anastasia A. Gubanova / Alexei Sintsov. Maxim Trankov was a commentator for Russian TV.

31-year-old Evgeni Plushenko, a ten-time national champion, was first in the men's short program by over five points ahead of 18-year-old Maxim Kovtun, with Sergei Voronov coming in third. In the free skate, Kovtun upset Plushenko to win his first national title, outscoring him by 11.09 points in the segment and 5.76 points overall. Voronov took the bronze, his sixth national medal. In fourth place overall was the 2011 national champion, 30-year-old Konstantin Menshov, who had to climb from 10th after the short program, while 15-year-old Adian Pitkeev finished fifth, 0.08 of a point ahead of Artur Gachinski. Mikhail Kolyada withdrew during the long program, unable to fix a problem with his laces.

In the short dance, defending national champions Ekaterina Bobrova / Dmitri Soloviev scored 4.60 points more than second-placed Elena Ilinykh / Nikita Katsalapov. The 2012 World Junior champions, Victoria Sinitsina / Ruslan Zhiganshin, landed in third place, 0.48 of a point ahead of the defending Russian bronze medalists, Ekaterina Riazanova / Ilia Tkachenko. Bobrova / Soloviev also placed first in the free dance and won their fourth national title, defeating Ilinykh / Katsalapov by 7.29 points in the segment and 11.89 overall. The silver medalists both fell as a result of their blades clashing. Sinitsina / Zhiganshin took bronze—their first senior national medal—by outscoring Riazanova / Tkachenko by 1.13 points in the segment and 1.61 overall. The 2011 World Junior champions, Ksenia Monko / Kirill Khaliavin, finished in fifth place ahead of Alexandra Stepanova / Ivan Bukin, who won the same title in 2013.

Ksenia Stolbova / Fedor Klimov earned a narrow victory in the pairs' short program, scoring 0.47 more than the 2012 national champions, Vera Bazarova / Yuri Larionov, while Evgenia Tarasova / Vladimir Morozov were five points back in third. The top two were nearly tied in the free skate, Bazarova / Larionov placing first by 0.02. Stolbova / Klimov finished first overall by 0.45 and won their first national title. Maria Vigalova / Egor Zakroev, competing as juniors internationally, moved up from fourth to take the bronze medal. The next four pairs clustered within 2.60 points of each other, led by Julia Antipova / Nodari Maisuradze who finished fourth for the second year in a row. Tarasova / Morozov dropped to eighth overall. Although she was hurt when they both fell during a lift near the end of their program, she was able to resume and complete the final element, a pair spin.

The 2012 national champion Adelina Sotnikova was first in the ladies' short program, 2.21 points ahead of Yulia Lipnitskaya, while Elena Radionova edged Alena Leonova by 0.73 of a point for third position. Lipnitskaia narrowly won the free skate, just 0.25 separating her from Sotnikova. Her overall score was 1.96 less than Sotnikova who won her fourth national title while Lipnitskaia took her second silver medal. Radionova remained in third, winning bronze. 13-year-old Alexandra Proklova finished fourth, edging out Leonova who slipped to fifth with a seventh-place free skate. Defending national champion Elizaveta Tuktamysheva finished 10th.

=== Schedule ===
- Tuesday, December 24
  - 14:00 – Men's short
  - 16:45 – Opening ceremony
  - 17:45 – Pairs' short
  - 20:00 – Short dance
- Wednesday, December 25
  - 14:00 – Ladies' short
  - 16:45 – Men's free
  - 20:00 – Free dance
- Thursday, December 26
  - 16:00 – Pairs' free
  - 18:40 – Ladies' free
- Friday, December 27
  - 13:00 – Medal ceremonies
  - 14:00 – Exhibitions

=== Results ===
==== Men ====
Rank	Name	Region	Total points	SP		FS	
1	Maxim Kovtun	MSK	267.13	2	93.08	1	174.05
2	Evgeni Plushenko	SPB	261.37	1	98.41	2	162.96
3	Sergei Voronov	MSK	249.44	3	89.10	3	160.34
4	Konstantin Menshov	SPB	230.13	10	70.72	4	159.41
5	Adian Pitkeev	MSK	224.25	4	76.75	6	147.50
6	Artur Gachinski	SPB	224.17	12	69.10	5	155.07
7	Zhan Bush	MSK	217.40	5	73.40	8	144.00
8	Alexander Petrov	SPB	216.47	7	71.79	7	144.68
9	Artur Dmitriev Jr.	MSK	202.03	8	71.32	11	130.71
10	Murad Kurbanov	MSK	199.86	14	64.48	9	135.38
11	Sergei Borodulin	MSK	197.31	13	64.72	10	132.59
12	Gordei Gorshkov	SPB	196.72	9	70.73	14	125.99
13	Alexander Samarin	MSK	193.11	16	63.03	12	130.08
14	Andrei Lazukin	SPB	186.25	18	58.42	13	127.83
15	Moris Kvitelashvili	MSK	184.98	11	70.47	16	114.51
16	Vladislav Sesganov	SPB	182.75	17	62.74	15	120.01
17	Konstantin Milyukov	KAZ	165.58	15	64.10	17	101.48
WD	Mikhail Kolyada	SPB		6	73.11		

==== Ladies ====
Rank	Name	Region	Total points	SP		FS	
1	Adelina Sotnikova	MOS	212.77	1	72.53	2	140.24
2	Yulia Lipnitskaya	MOS / EKAT	210.81	2	70.32	1	140.49
3	Elena Radionova	MOS	202.01	3	67.76	3	134.25
4	Alexandra Proklova	MOS	195.39	5	64.07	4	131.32
5	Alena Leonova	MOS / SPB	187.48	4	67.03	7	120.45
6	Serafima Sakhanovich	SPB	183.58	7	62.36	6	121.22
7	Evgenia Medvedeva	MOS	181.86	8	62.19	8	119.67
8	Anna Pogorilaya	MOS	180.88	10	59.35	5	121.53
9	Nikol Gosviani	SPB	176.54	6	63.20	10	113.34
10	Elizaveta Tuktamysheva	SPB	175.59	9	59.81	9	115.78
11	Maria Artemieva	SPB	155.23	11	57.07	14	98.16
12	Sofia Biryukova	MOS	150.15	15	49.89	12	100.26
13	Diana Pervushkina	SAM	149.14	16	49.16	13	99.98
14	Alsu Kaiumova	MOS	144.83	17	43.40	11	101.43
15	Diana Shamsutdinova	IZHEVSK	144.40	14	50.01	15	94.39
16	Polina Agafonova	SPB	144.32	12	53.13	17	91.19
17	Alina Maximova	MOS / KAZ	143.59	13	50.47	16	93.12
18	Anna Shershak	MOS	130.62	18	42.52	18	88.10

==== Pairs ====
Rank	Name	Region	Total points	SP		FS	
1	Ksenia Stolbova / Fedor Klimov	SPB / MOS	214.47	1	75.55	2	138.92
2	Vera Bazarova / Yuri Larionov	MOS / SARANSK	214.02	2	75.08	1	138.94
3	Maria Vigalova / Egor Zakroev	PERM	182.35	4	64.33	3	118.02
4	Julia Antipova / Nodari Maisuradze	MOS	174.97	5	64.28	7	110.69
5	Vasilisa Davankova / Andrei Deputat	MOS	173.09	6	62.06	6	111.03
6	Lina Fedorova / Maxim Miroshkin	MOS	172.80	9	59.03	4	113.77
7	Katarina Gerboldt / Alexander Enbert	SPB	172.37	7	60.06	5	112.31
8	Evgenia Tarasova / Vladimir Morozov	MOS / KAZ	169.06	3	69.72	10	99.34
9	Kristina Astakhova / Maxim Kurdyukov	MOS	159.62	8	59.44	8	100.18
10	Anastasia A. Gubanova / Alexei Sintsov	PERM	153.28	10	53.19	9	100.09

==== Ice dancing ====
Rank	Name	Region	Total points	SD		FD	
1	Ekaterina Bobrova / Dmitri Soloviev	MOS	179.90	1	73.27	1	106.63
2	Elena Ilinykh / Nikita Katsalapov	MOS	168.01	2	68.67	2	99.34
3	Victoria Sinitsina / Ruslan Zhiganshin	MOS	165.60	3	67.08	3	98.52
4	Ekaterina Riazanova / Ilia Tkachenko	MOB	163.99	4	66.60	4	97.39
5	Ksenia Monko / Kirill Khaliavin	MOS	155.59	5	62.57	6	93.02
6	Alexandra Stepanova / Ivan Bukin	MOS	151.80	6	58.71	5	93.09
7	Valeria Zenkova / Valerie Sinitsin	MOS	133.87	7	53.61	8	80.26
8	Ekaterina Pushkash / Jonathan Guerreiro	MOS	133.62	8	51.44	7	82.18
9	Anzhelika Kanivets / Alexei Chizhov	SVE	81.88	9	29.08	9	52.80
10	Svetlana Khomiakova / Nikita Shubo-Yablonski	KIR	81.40	10	29.04	10	52.36

== Junior Championships ==
The 2014 Russian Junior Championships (Russian: Первенство России) were held on 22–25 January 2014 in Saransk.

=== Results ===
==== Men ====
Rank	Name	Region	Total points	SP		FS	
1	Adian Pitkeev	MOS	229.59	1	79.82	1	149.77
2	Alexander Petrov	SPB	227.71	2	79.14	2	148.57
3	Moris Kvitelashvili	MOS	206.83	9	60.13	3	146.70
4	Alexander Samarin	MOS	204.33	7	64.79	4	139.54
5	Mikhail Kolyada	SPB	201.99	3	71.34	6	130.65
6	Murad Kurbanov	MOS	200.94	6	65.01	5	135.93
7	Vladimir Samoilov	MOS	187.96	12	59.64	7	128.32
8	Andrei Lazukin	SPB	184.02	4	70.15	11	113.87
9	Artem Lezheev	S/K	179.50	5	66.28	12	113.22
10	Alexey Genya	MOB	176.81	10	60.06	8	116.75
11	Stanislav Andryunin	MOS	176.36	11	59.82	9	116.54
12	Roman Savosin	MOS	173.89	13	58.25	10	115.64
13	Evgeni Ilyn	Kazan	163.75	15	55.90	13	107.85
14	Anton Shulepov	S/V	162.47	8	61.65	16	100.82
15	Daniil Bernadiner	MOS	160.04	14	57.93	15	102.11
16	Igor Efimchuk	SPB	157.85	16	50.78	14	107.07

==== Ladies ====
Rank	Name	Region	Total points	SP		FS	
1	Serafima Sakhanovich	SPB	196.78	1	67.82	1	128.96
2	Maria Sotskova	MOS	191.69	2	64.26	2	127.43
3	Alexandra Proklova	MOS	186.50	5	63.24	3	123.26
4	Evgenia Medvedeva	MOS	183.70	4	63.25	4	120.45
5	Polina Tsurskaya	M/O	179.60	3	63.58	6	116.02
6	Elizaveta Iushenko	MOS	179.44	6	63.24	5	117.91
7	Anastasiia Gubanova	SPB	173.71	9	58.75	7	114.96
8	Alsu Kaiumova	MOS	168.64	11	55.95	8	112.69
9	Natalia Ogoreltseva	S/U	166.89	8	60.92	10	105.97
10	Anastasia Kolomiets	SPB	165.88	10	58.37	9	107.51
11	Viktoria Bezrukova	MOS	163.24	7	61.09	11	102.15
12	Polina Drynkina	MOS	150.34	13	53.45	12	96.89
13	Valeria Mikhailova	MOS	147.55	12	53.50	13	94.05
14	Alexandra Fomina	MOS	138.39	14	48.08	14	90.31
15	Sofia Istomina	MOS	132.95	17	45.45	15	88.85
16	Anastasia Bugakova	MOS	124.90	15	46.17	17	78.73
17	Anastasia Zinkina	Saransk	124.12	18	38.08	16	86.04
18	Yulia Li	MOS	124.12	16	45.45	18	65.27

==== Pairs ====
Rank	Name	Region	Total points	SP		FS	
1	Evgenia Tarasova / Vladimir Morozov	MOS	186.31	1	66.06	1	120.25
2	Maria Vigalova / Egor Zakroev	Perm	178.95	3	61.64	2	117.31
3	Vasilisa Davankova / Andrei Deputat	MOS	177.54	2	63.24	3	114.30
4	Lina Fedorova / Maxim Miroshkin	MOS	156.61	4	58.78	6	97.83
5	Kamilla Gainetdinova / Ivan Bich	M/S	155.26	5	53.87	4	101.39
6	Ekaterina Borisova / Sergei Lisiev	S/CH	152.36	7	51.30	5	101.06
7	Arina Cherniavskaia / Antonio Souza-Kordeyru	MOS	146.01	6	51.51	7	94.50
8	Anastasia A. Gubanova / Alexei Sintsov	Perm	144.89	8	50.51	8	94.38
9	Tatiana Domracheva / Andrei Filonov	MOS	139.96	10	47.92	9	92.04
10	Anastasia Poluianova / Stepan Korotkov	Perm	130.33	11	45.04	10	85.29
11	Alina Solovieva / Viktor Kudriavtsev	MOS	123.75	9	49.51	12	74.24
12	Daria Beklemisheva / Yaroslav Maslov	SPB	117.81	12	42.37	11	75.44

==== Ice dancing ====
Rank	Name	Region	Total points	SD		FD	
1	Alexandra Stepanova / Ivan Bukin	MOS	164.31	1	69.12	1	95.19
2	Anna Yanovskaya / Sergey Mozgov	MOS	151.75	2	64.79	2	86.96
3	Betina Popova / Yuri Vlasenko	MOS	146.40	4	60.31	4	86.09
4	Evgenia Kosigina / Nikolai Moroshkin	S/M	145.52	3	60.73	5	84.79
5	Alla Loboda / Pavel Drozd	MOS	145.19	5	58.53	3	86.66
6	Daria Morozova / Mikhail Zhirnov	MOS	136.42	7	56.56	6	79.86
7	Anastasia Shpilevaya / Grigory Smirnov	MOS	132.48	6	56.96	7	75.52
8	Eva Khachaturian / Igor Eremenko	MOS	128.00	8	53.86	8	74.14
9	Sofia Polishchuk / Alexander Vakhnov	MOS	119.31	9	53.58	11	65.73
10	Ksenia Konkina / Georgy Reviya	MOB	116.75	11	47.90	9	68.85
11	Ekaterina Bocharova / Anton Shibnev	MOS	115.13	10	48.22	10	66.91
12	Daria Shirokhova / Nikita Nazarov	MOB	110.85	12	46.59	12	64.26
13	Daria Rumiantseva / Dmitri Riabchenko	MOS	106.70	13	42.99	14	63.71
14	Liudmila Sosnitskaya / Pavel Golovishnikov	MOS	105.13	14	41.09	13	64.04
15	Daria Velichko / Egor Tarasenko	MOS	98.25	15	39.63	15	58.62

== International team selections ==
=== European Championships ===
The team to the 2014 European Championships was announced on 27 December 2013 as follows:

	Men	Ladies	Pairs	Ice dancing
1	Maxim Kovtun	Adelina Sotnikova	Tatiana Volosozhar / Maxim Trankov	Elena Ilinykh / Nikita Katsalapov
2	Sergei Voronov	Yulia Lipnitskaya	Ksenia Stolbova / Fedor Klimov	Victoria Sinitsina / Ruslan Zhiganshin
3	Konstantin Menshov	Alena Leonova	Vera Bazarova / Yuri Larionov	Ekaterina Riazanova / Ilia Tkachenko
1st alt.	Adian Pitkeev	Anna Pogorilaya	Julia Antipova / Nodari Maisuradze	Ksenia Monko / Kirill Khaliavin
2nd alt.	Artur Gachinski	Nikol Gosviani	Vasilisa Davankova / Andrei Deputat	Alexandra Stepanova / Ivan Bukin

=== Winter Olympics ===
The team to the 2014 Winter Olympics was announced on 22 January 2014 as follows:

	Men	Ladies	Pairs	Ice dancing
1	Evgeni Plushenko	Yulia Lipnitskaya	Vera Bazarova / Yuri Larionov	Ekaterina Bobrova / Dmitri Soloviev
2		Adelina Sotnikova	Tatiana Volosozhar / Maxim Trankov	Elena Ilinykh / Nikita Katsalapov
3			Ksenia Stolbova / Fedor Klimov	Victoria Sinitsina / Ruslan Zhiganshin
1st alt.	Maxim Kovtun	Alena Leonova	Julia Antipova / Nodari Maisuradze	Ekaterina Riazanova / Ilia Tkachenko
2nd alt.	Sergei Voronov			

=== World Junior Championships ===
The team to the 2014 World Junior Championships was announced on 28 January 2014 and amended in March 2014.

	Men	Ladies	Pairs	Ice dancing
1	Adian Pitkeev	Serafima Sakhanovich	Evgenia Tarasova / Vladimir Morozov	~~Alexandra Stepanova / Ivan Bukin~~
2	Alexander Petrov	~~Maria Sotskova~~	Maria Vigalova / Egor Zakroev	Anna Yanovskaya / Sergey Mozgov
3	N/A	~~Alexandra Proklova~~	Vasilisa Davankova / Andrei Deputat	Betina Popova / Yuri Vlasenko
1st alt.	Moris Kvitelashvili	Elena Radionova (added)	Lina Fedorova / Maxim Miroshkin	Evgenia Kosigina / Nikolai Moroshkin (added)
2nd alt.	Alexander Samarin	Evgenia Medvedeva (added)	Kamilla Gainetdinova / Ivan Bich	Alla Loboda / Pavel Drozd

=== World Championships ===
Russia's provisional team to the 2014 World Championships was published by the International Skating Union on 4 March and confirmed by the Russian federation on 17 March:

	Men	Ladies	Pairs	Ice dancing
1	Maxim Kovtun	Yulia Lipnitskaya	Ksenia Stolbova / Fedor Klimov	Elena Ilinykh / Nikita Katsalapov
2		Anna Pogorilaya	Vera Bazarova / Yuri Larionov	Ekaterina Bobrova / Dmitri Soloviev
3			Julia Antipova / Nodari Maisuradze	Victoria Sinitsina / Ruslan Zhiganshin
1st alt.	Sergei Voronov	Adelina Sotnikova	Tatiana Volosozhar / Maxim Trankov	Ekaterina Riazanova / Ilia Tkachenko
2nd alt.	Konstantin Menshov	Alena Leonova	Evgenia Tarasova / Vladimir Morozov	Ksenia Monko / Kirill Khaliavin
3rd alt.		Nikol Gosviani	Vasilisa Davankova / Andrei Deputat	Alexandra Stepanova / Ivan Bukin
