= Figure skating at the 2011 Winter Universiade – Pair skating =

Figure skating at the 2011 Winter Universiade included a pairs event for senior level skaters. The short program was held on February 1 and the free skating on February 2, 2011.

== Results ==
Rank	Name	Nation	Total points	SP		FS	
1	Lubov Iliushechkina / Nodari Maisuradze	Russia	175.03	1	60.59	1	114.44
2	Dong Huibo / Wu Yiming	China	140.26	3	45.47	2	94.79
3	Zhang Yue / Wang Lei	China	137.19	2	47.13	3	90.06
4	Sabina Imaikina / Konstantin Bezmaternikh	Russia	128.76	4	43.66	4	85.10
5	Ksenia Ozerova / Denis Golubev	Russia	96.61	5	36.28	5	60.33
