= Maxim Kovtun =

Russian figure skater

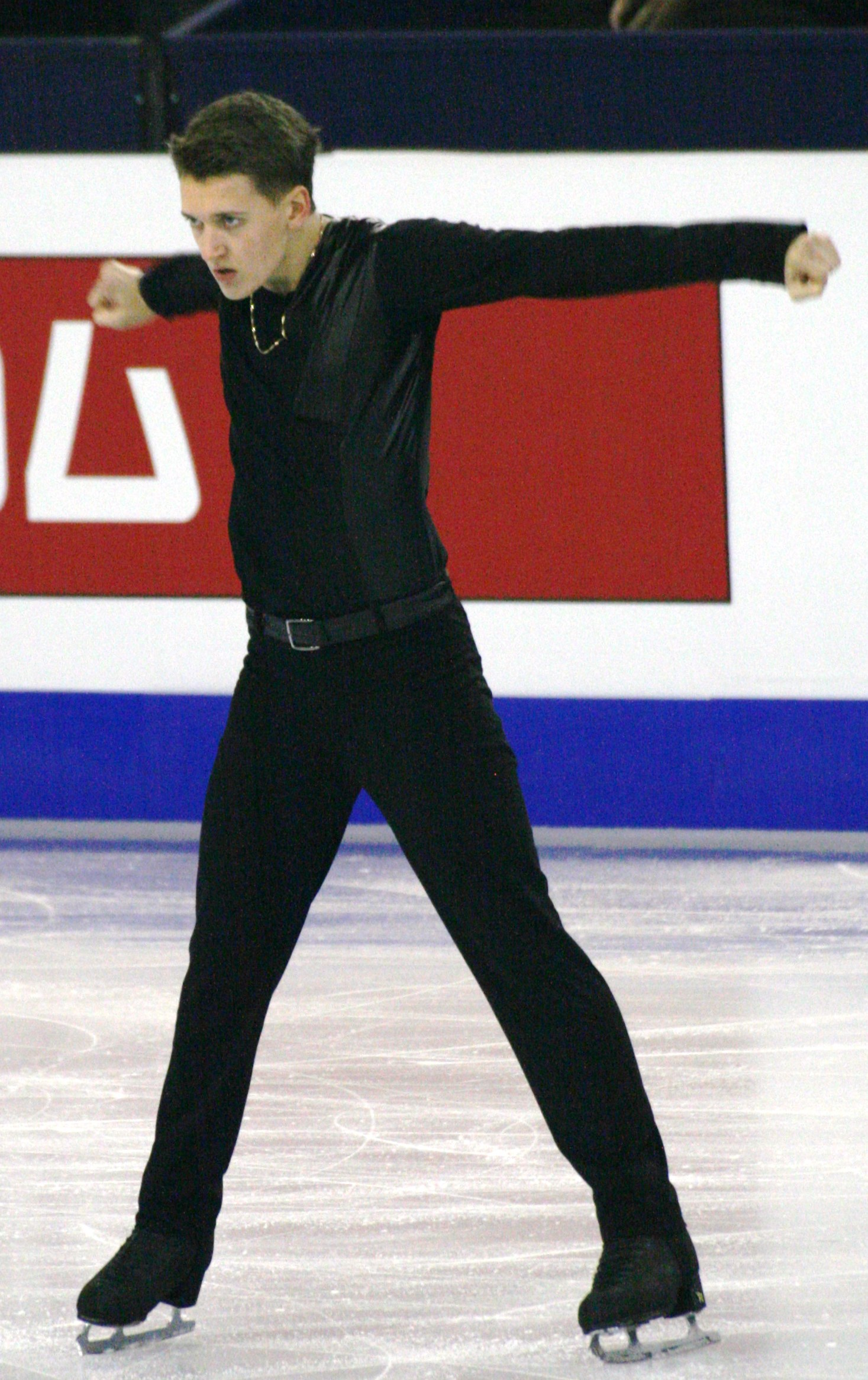
- Kovtun at the 2014 Grand Prix Final

Personal information
- Full name: Maxim Pavlovich Kovtun
- Born: 18 June 1995 (age 31) Yekaterinburg, Russia
- Home town: Moscow, Russia
- Height: 1.82 m (5 ft 11 1/2 in)

Figure skating career
- Country: Russia
- Discipline: Men's singles
- Began skating: 1997
- Retired: 23 April 2019
- Highest WS: 6th (2015–16)

Medal record
European Championships
Silver medal – second place	2015 Stockholm	Singles
Silver medal – second place	2017 Ostrava	Singles
Bronze medal – third place	2016 Bratislava	Singles
Russian Championships
Gold medal – first place	2014 Sochi	Singles
Gold medal – first place	2015 Sochi	Singles
Gold medal – first place	2016 Yekaterinburg	Singles
Gold medal – first place	2019 Saransk	Singles
Bronze medal – third place	2017 Chelyabinsk	Singles
World Team Trophy
Silver medal – second place	2015 Tokyo	Team
Silver medal – second place	2017 Tokyo	Team
Junior Grand Prix Final
Gold medal – first place	2012–13 Sochi	Singles

Maxim Pavlovich Kovtun (Russian: Максим Павлович Ковтун; born 18 June 1995) is a retired Russian figure skater. He is a three-time European medalist (silver in 2015 and 2017, bronze in 2016) and four-time (2014, 2015, 2016, 2019) Russian national champion. On the junior level, he is the 2012 JGP Final champion. Kovtun has successfully landed two quad jumps in a short program, and three quads in a free program.

On 23 April 2019, Kovtun announced his retirement from competition.

== Personal life ==
Maxim Pavlovich Kovtun was born 18 June 1995 in Yekaterinburg. His two older brothers formerly competed in figure skating and his father, Pavel, is a skating coach and former pair skater. He was in a relationship with a gymnast Chilita Bagdzhi from 2015 until 2016. He has been dating a Russian group rhythmic gymnast Evgeniia Levanova since 2019.

== Career ==
Taken to the ice rink by his father, Kovtun began skating at age four in Yekaterinburg and was coached mainly by Maria Voitsekhovskaia in his early years. He also trained in ice hockey but chose skating at age ten.

=== 2011–12 season: JGP and senior debuts ===
In the spring of 2011, Kovtun began training with Nikolai Morozov. He debuted on the ISU Junior Grand Prix (JGP) circuit in the 2011–12 season, winning gold at his first event in Romania and then silver in Estonia. He qualified for the 2011–12 JGP Final where he finished fourth. At the 2012 Russian Championships, Kovtun finished twelfth on the senior level and won the bronze medal on the junior level. He was assigned to the 2012 World Team Trophy—his first senior international event—following Sergei Voronov's injury-related withdrawal. He finished twelfth at the event.

=== 2012–13 season: Gold at JGP Final ===
In the summer of 2012, Kovtun switched coaches to Elena Buianova (Vodorezova). He began the 2012–13 season by winning a pair of gold medals at JGP events in Croatia and Germany. In Croatia, he scored a personal best 80.00 points in free skating TES. Kovtun qualified for the JGP Final in Sochi, Russia, where he won gold by eleven points over silver medalist Joshua Farris. At the event, he scored 149.78 points for his free skate which included a 4T-3T, 3A-3T and 3A.

Kovtun said he would try two quads in his free program at the 2013 Russian Championships. Although he finished fifth on the senior level, he was named in the Russian team to the 2013 European Championships because Russian regulations guaranteed berths only to the top two finishers while a committee had the right to choose the third entry. In his European debut, Kovtun placed seventh in the short program, fourth in the free skate, and fifth overall with a total score of 226.57 points. In the free skate, his fourth combination (3S-2T) was deemed invalid. Kovtun finished seventeenth in his first World Championships, held in London, Ontario, Canada. He was eighth in the men's event at the 2013 World Team Trophy and Team Russia finished fourth.

=== 2013–14 season: First senior national title ===
Kovtun found his short program for the 2013–14 season very challenging, stating, "When we [began training the program], it was just hell. [...] I needed half an hour to learn one step, so it took a very long time to put this all together." He made his senior Grand Prix debut at the 2013 Cup of China. He placed second in the short—landing a 4S-3T, 4T and 3A—and first in the free skate, in which he landed a 4S, 4S-2T, 3A-2T and 3A. Kovtun won the silver medal overall behind China's Han Yan. He won another silver medal at the 2013 Rostelecom Cup. The results qualified him to his first senior Grand Prix Final. He finished fifth at the event in Fukuoka, Japan.

At the 2014 Russian Championships, Kovtun placed second in the short program and first in the free skate. He was awarded the gold medal ahead of three-time Olympic medalist Evgeni Plushenko. After Kovtun again placed fifth at the European Championships, Russia received a sole spot in the men's event at the 2014 Winter Olympics in Sochi, which was assigned to Plushenko despite Kovtun placing higher. Plushenko skated earlier in the Olympics in helping win gold in the team competition. On Thursday 13 February 2014, Plushenko decided to withdraw from the men's singles competition following his pre-short program warm up during which he sustained a back injury. However, Plushenko's withdrawal was after the Sunday deadline to name a replacement which left Russia without an entry in men's singles.

Kovtun was sent to the 2014 World Championships in Saitama, Japan. He placed seventh in the short program, fifth in the free skate, and finished fourth overall behind Spain's Javier Fernández.

=== 2014–15 season: Silver at Europeans ===
For the 2014–15 Grand Prix season, Kovtun was assigned to compete at the Cup of China and Trophée Bompard. He placed first in both segments to win the gold medal in China, ahead of the Olympic champion, Yuzuru Hanyu, and Richard Dornbush. He then won the gold medal in France ahead of Tatsuki Machida and Denis Ten. Kovtun qualified to the Grand Prix Final as the only skater that won both of his assignments. He placed third in the short program, skating last, and then fifth in the free skate, finishing fourth overall behind his teammate Sergei Voronov.

At the 2015 Russian Championships, Kovtun won his second national title. At the 2015 European Championships, he ranked fourth in the short program and second in the free skate, ending in second place overall, behind Javier Fernández. He then finished seventh at the 2015 World Championships in Shanghai, China.

=== 2015–16 season ===
Kovtun started the 2015–16 season with gold at the 2015 CS Mordovian Ornament. Turning to the Grand Prix series, he placed second in the short program (SP) at the 2015 Trophée Éric Bompard. Due to the November 2015 Paris attacks, the free skate was cancelled and the SP standings were deemed the final results. Kovtun finished tenth at his second GP event, the 2015 NHK Trophy, which meant he did not qualify for the Final. In December, he won his third consecutive national title, at the 2016 Russian Championships in his home city of Yekaterinburg.

In late January, Kovtun was awarded the bronze medal at the 2016 European Championships in Bratislava, having placed second in the short and sixth in the free. He finished 18th at the 2016 World Championships in Boston. On 16 May 2016, Buyanova announced that Kovtun had left her group and joined Inna Goncharenko.

=== 2016–17 season ===
After taking the bronze medal at the 2016 CS Finlandia Trophy, Kovtun finished seventh at both of his Grand Prix assignments, the 2016 Skate America and 2016 Cup of China. At the 2017 Russian Championships, he received the bronze medal, having finished third to Mikhail Kolyada and Alexander Samarin. He said that he had begun consulting a psychologist. He won the silver medal at the 2017 European Championships, earning new personal bests in the short program, free skate and overall. He placed eleventh at the 2017 World Championships.

=== 2017–18 season ===
Kovtun withdrew from the 2017 Finlandia Trophy and his first Grand Prix assignment, 2017 Skate Canada, due to a back injury. Kovtun competed in the short program at 2017 Skate America, placing twelfth, and withdrew as a result of continued back and knee problems. At the 2018 Russian Championships, he placed sixteenth in the short program, and again withdrew. Commenting afterward on his disappointing result, Kovtun said it was a "novel experience" and that he "was physically unable to train, simply because I could not bend down to tie my laces and then straighten up again." He resumed training in February 2018.

=== 2018–19 season ===
Coached by Elena Buianova and Alexander Uspenski at CSKA Moscow, Kovtun began his season by winning the gold medal at the 2018 CS Tallinn Trophy. Competing at the 2019 Russian Championships, he placed first in both the short program and the free skate to claim his fourth Russian national title.

At the 2019 European Championships, Kovtun placed fifth in the short program. He had serious problems in the free skate, popping several of his planned quad and triple jumps, and as a result placed sixteenth in the free and dropped to fourteenth overall.

In March 2019, he took silver at the 2019 Winter Universiade in Krasnoyarsk, Russia. Kovtun withdrew from the 2019 World Championships, citing medical reasons.

On 23 April 2019, Kovtun announced his retirement from competitive skating.

== Programs ==
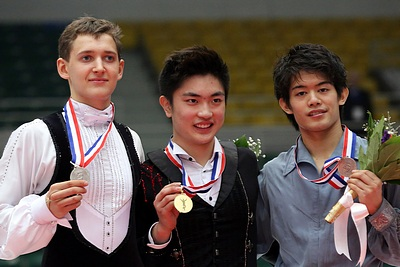
Kovtun at the 2013 Cup of China podium.

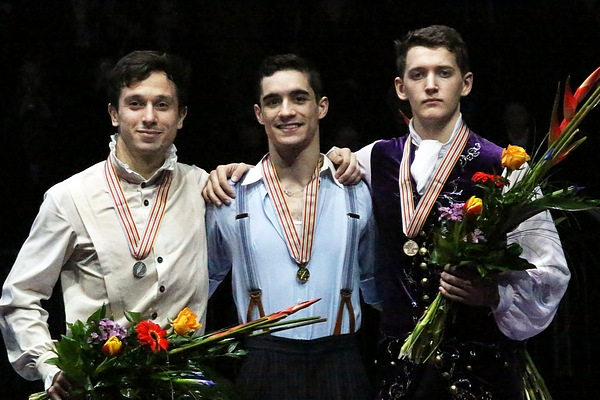
Kovtun at the 2016 European Figure Skating Championships podium.

Season	Short program	Free skating	Exhibition
2018–19	L-O-V-E performed by Nat King Cole; Sing, Sing, Sing (with a Swing) performed by Benny Goodman choreo. by Peter Tchernyshev	Carmen by Georges Bizet choreo. by Peter Tchernyshev	
2017–18	Flamenco selection	Hey You by Pink Floyd	
2016–17	Bahamut by Hazmat Modine	Iron Sky by Paolo Nutini	What a Wonderful World by Louis Armstrong
2015–16	I Can't Dance by Genesis choreo. by Peter Tchernyshev	Symphony No.5 in C-minor by Ludwig van Beethoven choreo. by Peter Tchernyshev	Kiss by Art of Noise ft. Tom Jones
2014–15	Boléro by Maurice Ravel choreo. by Irina Tagaeva	Exogenesis: Symphony by Muse choreo. by Irina Tagaeva	Kiss by Art of Noise ft. Tom Jones
2013–14	Farruca by Pepe Romero choreo. by Peter Tchernyshev	Piano Concerto No. 1 by Pyotr I. Tchaikovsky choreo. by Peter Tchernyshev	Summertime
2012–13	Lawrence of Arabia by Maurice Jarre	Casablanca by Max Steiner	Ain't no sunshine when she's gone
2011–12	Murka performed by Neschastny Sluchai	Austin Powers by George S. Clinton	

== Competitive highlights ==
- GP – Event of the ISU Grand Prix Series
- JGP – Event of the ISU Junior Grand Prix Series
- CS – Event of the ISU Challenger Series
- WD – Withdrew from competition
- Medals at team events are awarded for the team results only. Individual placements at team events are listed in parentheses.

Competition placements at senior level
Season	2010–11	2011–12	2012–13	2013–14	2014–15	2015–16	2016–17	2017–18	2018–19
World Championships			17th	4th	7th	18th	11th		
European Championships			5th	5th	2nd	3rd	2nd		14th
Grand Prix Final				5th	4th				
Russian Championships	11th	12th	5th	1st	1st	1st	3rd	WD	1st
World Team Trophy		5th (12th)	4th (8th)		2nd (7th)		2nd (9th)		
GP Cup of China				2nd	1st		7th		
GP NHK Trophy						10th			
GP Rostelecom Cup				2nd					
GP Skate America							7th	WD	
GP Trophée Éric Bompard					1st	2nd			
CS Finlandia Trophy							3rd		
CS Mordovian Ornament						1st			
CS Tallinn Trophy									1st
Winter Universiade									2nd

Competition placements at junior level
Season	2010–11	2011–12	2012–13
Junior Grand Prix Final		4th	1st
Russian Championships	5th	3rd	
Croatia			1st
Estonia		2nd	
Germany			1st
Romania		1st	
European Youth Olympic Festival	2nd		

== Detailed results ==
=== Senior level ===
Small medals for short and free programs awarded only at ISU Championships. At team events, medals awarded for team results only.

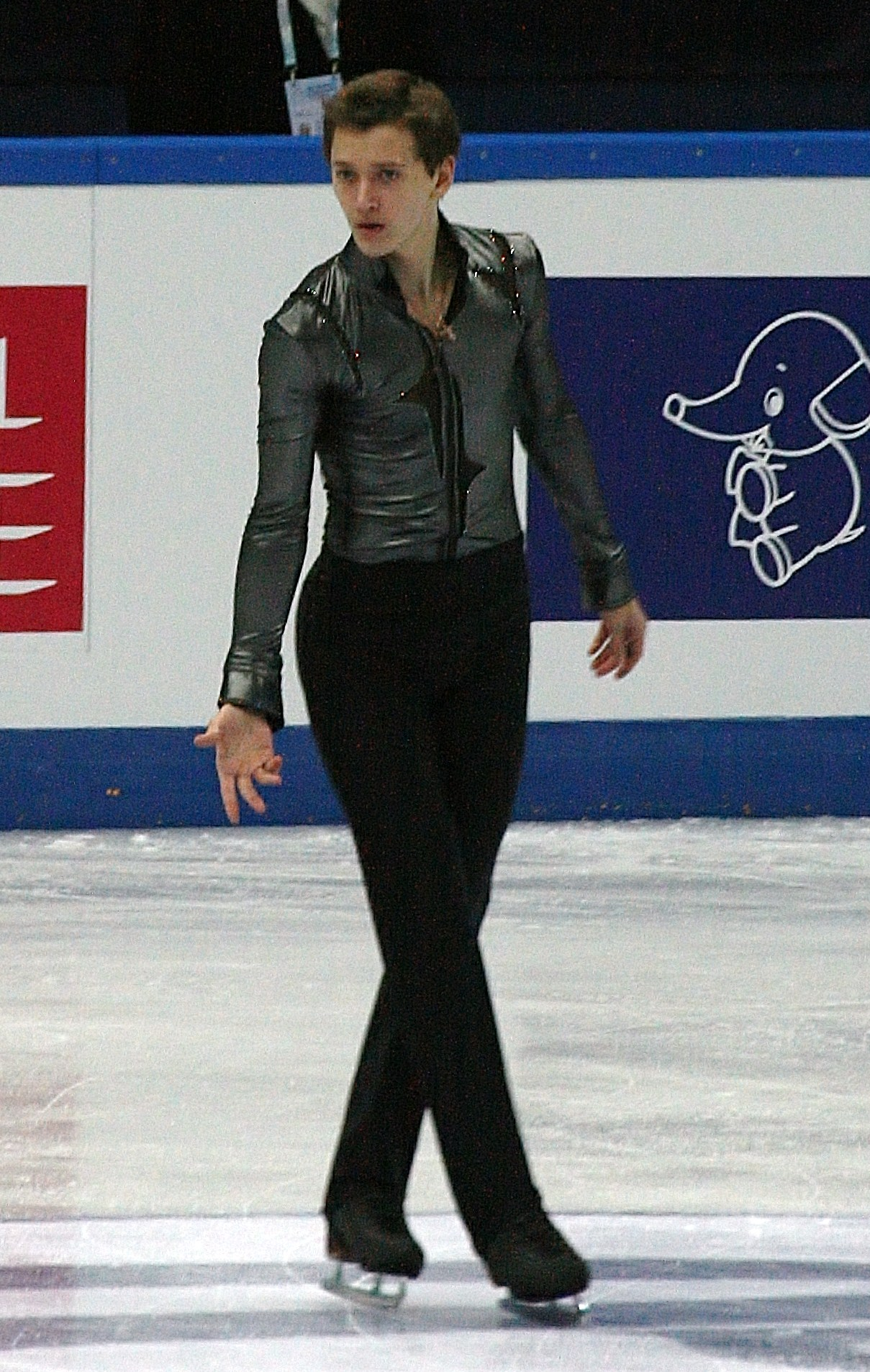
Kovtun at the 2012–13 JGP Final

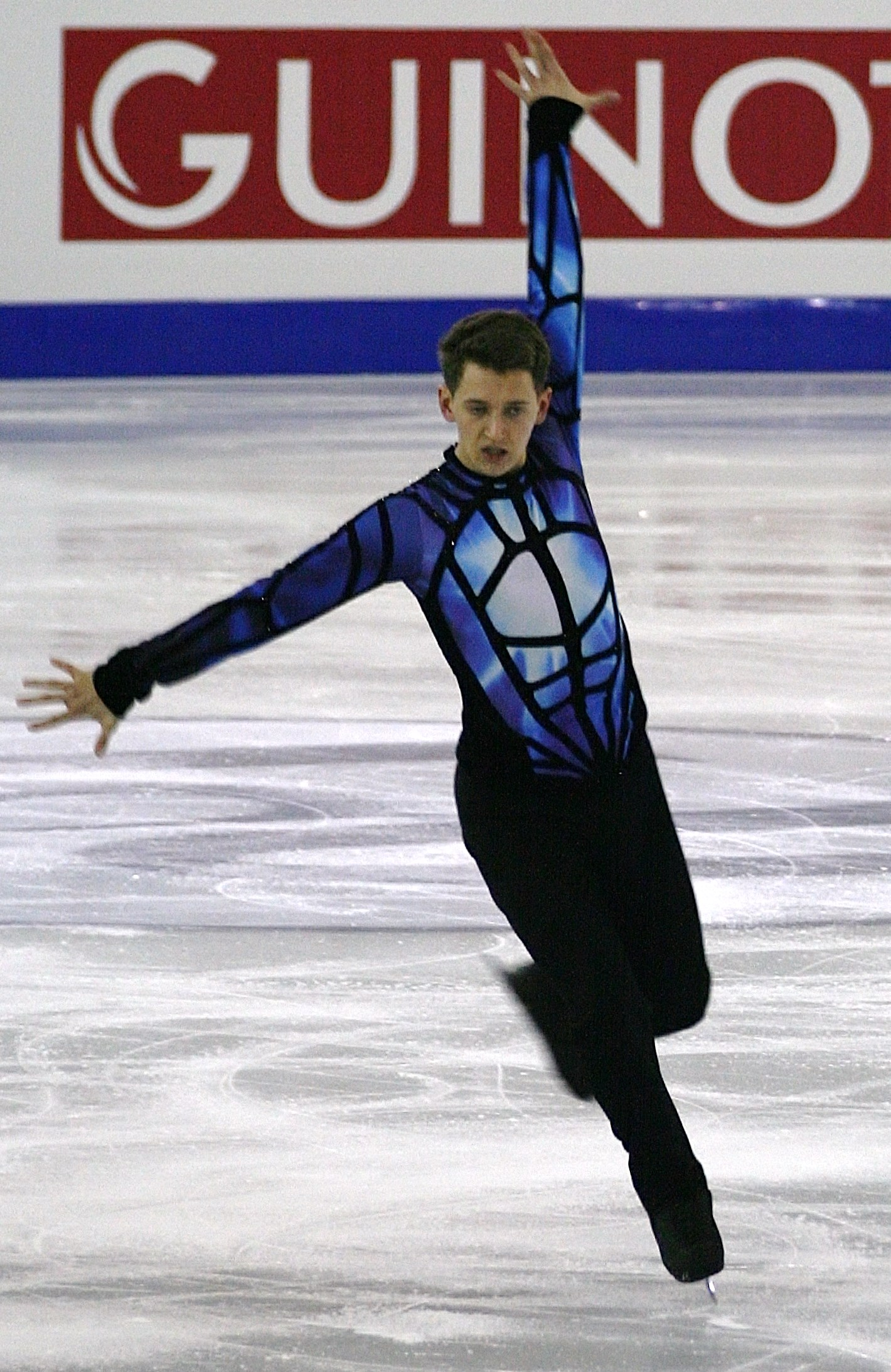
Kovtun at the 2014–15 GP Final

2018–19 season
Date	Event	SP	FS	Total
7–9 March 2019	2019 Winter Universiade	1; 91.74	3; 167.75	2; 259.49
21–27 January 2019	2019 European Championships	5; 87.70	16; 128.48	14; 216.18
19–23 December 2018	2019 Russian Championships	1; 95.14	1; 186.45	1; 281.59
26 November – 2 December 2018	2018 CS Tallinn Trophy	1; 80.91	1; 166.64	1; 247.55
2017–18 season
Date	Event	SP	FS	Total
21–24 December 2017	2018 Russian Championships	16; 64.72	WD	WD
24–26 November 2017	2017 Skate America	12; 64.98	WD	WD
2016–17 season
Date	Event	SP	FS	Total
20–23 April 2017	2017 World Team Trophy	11; 64.62	10; 148.29	2T/9P
29 March – 2 April 2017	2017 World Championships	10; 89.38	14; 156.46	11; 245.84
25–29 January 2017	2017 European Championships	2; 94.53	2; 172.27	2; 266.80
20–26 December 2016	2017 Russian Championships	7; 76.65	2; 172.72	3; 249.37
18–20 November 2016	2016 Cup of China	10; 70.10	7; 151.33	7; 221.43
21–23 October 2016	2016 Skate America	10; 67.43	6; 163.32	7; 230.75
6–10 October 2016	2016 CS Finlandia Trophy	1; 88.26	3; 141.31	3; 229.57
2015–16 season
Date	Event	SP	FS	Total
28 March – 3 April 2016	2016 World Championships	13; 78.46	21; 131.68	18; 210.14
26–31 January 2016	2016 European Championships	2; 88.09	6; 154.12	3; 242.21
24–27 December 2015	2016 Russian Championships	1; 93.05	1; 173.08	1; 266.13
27–29 November 2015	2015 NHK Trophy	4; 82.27	11; 130.36	10; 212.63
13–15 November 2015	2015 Trophée Éric Bompard	2; 86.82	cancelled	2; 86.82
16–19 October 2015	2015 CS Mordovian Ornament	4; 73.14	1; 163.24	1; 236.38
2014–15 season
Date	Event	SP	FS	Total
16–19 April 2015	2015 World Team Trophy	8; 74.83	6; 158.91	2T/7P; 233.74
23–29 March 2015	2015 World Championships	16; 70.82	6; 159.88	7; 230.70
26 January – 1 February 2015	2015 European Championships	4; 78.21	2; 157.47	2; 235.68
24–27 December 2014	2015 Russian Championships	1; 98.14	2; 173.38	1; 271.52
11–14 December 2014	2014–15 Grand Prix Final	3; 87.02	5; 155.25	4; 242.27
20–23 November 2014	2014 Trophée Éric Bompard	6; 77.11	1; 166.24	1; 243.35
7–9 November 2014	2014 Cup of China	1; 85.96	1; 157.38	1; 243.34
2013–14 season
Date	Event	SP	FS	Total
24–30 March 2014	2014 World Championships	7; 84.66	5; 162.71	4; 247.37
15–19 January 2014	2014 European Championships	4; 83.15	5; 149.22	5; 232.37
24–27 December 2013	2014 Russian Championships	2; 93.08	1; 174.05	1; 267.13
5–8 December 2013	2013–14 Grand Prix Final	5; 68.92	5; 164.32	5; 233.24
21–23 November 2013	2013 Rostelecom Cup	1; 92.53	2; 147.81	2; 240.34
1–2 November 2013	2013 Cup of China	2; 81.84	1; 156.81	2; 238.65

=== Junior level ===
2012–13 season
Date	Event	Level	SP	FS	Total
11–14 April 2013	2013 World Team Trophy	Senior	7; 76.67	8; 145.12	4T/8P; 221.79
10–17 March 2013	2013 World Championships	Senior	19; 65.85	14; 141.55	17; 207.40
23–27 January 2013	2013 European Championships	Senior	7; 74.46	4; 152.11	5; 226.57
25–28 December 2012	2013 Russian Championships	Senior	3; 75.38	5; 149.64	5; 225.02
6–8 December 2012	2012–13 Junior Grand Prix Final	Junior	2; 72.53	1; 149.78	1; 222.31
10–13 October 2012	2012 JGP Germany	Junior	1; 68.13	2; 124.91	1; 193.04
4–7 October 2012	2012 JGP Croatia	Junior	2; 69.47	1; 149.72	1; 219.19
2011–12 season
Date	Event	Level	SP	FS	Total
18–22 April 2012	2012 ISU World Team Trophy	Senior	11; 60.93	12; 111.53	5T/12P; 172.46
5–7 February 2012	2012 Russian Junior Championships	Junior	5; 65.21	2; 128.74	3; 193.95
5–7 February 2012	2012 Russian Championships	Senior	12; 66.11	11; 127.82	12; 193.93
8–11 December 2011	2011–12 Junior Grand Prix Final	Junior	4; 63.68	4; 130.08	4; 193.76
13–15 October 2011	2011 JGP Estonia	Junior	2; 58.47	2; 128.40	2; 186.87
22–24 September 2011	2011 JGP Romania	Junior	2; 61.14	1; 121.77	1; 182.91
2010–11 season
Date	Event	Level	SP	FS	Total
12–19 February 2011	2011 European Youth Olympic Festival	Junior	1; 60.93	2; 100.82	2; 161.75
2–4 February 2011	2011 Russian Junior Championships	Junior	4; 63.32	6; 119.25	5; 182.57
26–29 December 2010	2011 Russian Championships	Senior	6; 67.63	12; 120.87	11; 188.50
