= 2014 Four Continents Figure Skating Championships =

2014 Four Continents Championships
- Type: ISU Championship
- Date: January 20 – 26
- Season: 2013–14
- Location: Taipei, Taiwan
- Host: Chinese Taipei Skating Union
- Venue: Taipei Arena

Champions
- Men's singles: (Japan) Takahito Mura
- Ladies' singles: (Japan) Kanako Murakami
- Pairs: (China) Sui Wenjing / Han Cong
- Ice dance: (United States) Madison Hubbell / Zachary Donohue
- Previous: 2013 Four Continents Championships
- Next: 2015 Four Continents Championships

The 2014 Four Continents Figure Skating Championships was an international figure skating competition in the 2013–14 season. It was held at the Taipei Arena in Taipei, Taiwan on January 20–26. Medals were awarded in the disciplines of men's singles, ladies' singles, pair skating, and ice dancing.

The event featured a total of 94 athletes from 15 nations from North America, Africa, Asia, and Oceania. There were 29 competitors in the men's event and 21 competitors in the ladies' event. There was also 7 pair teams and 15 ice dancing teams.

== Venues ==
The competition was held at the Taipei Arena. Completed at the end of August 2005, it is located on the intersection of Dunhua North Road and Section 4 of Nanjing East Road in Shongshan District. This arena is also the first international-standard competition venue with a capacity of 15,000 spectator seats in Taipei City. It is also designed to hold concerts, art performance, exhibitions, conventions, etc.

The Taipei Annex Arena was the official practice rink of the championships. It is an international-standard ice rink (30 meters x 60 meters) with a capacity of 800~1000 spectator seats. This ice rink is frozen all year round and has been used for all kind of winter sports activities (e.g. figure skating, short track speed skating and ice hockey) and also been hosted numerous local and international competitions.

The Sunworld Dynasty Hotel Taipei was the official hotel of the event. It is located in the center of financial, banking, and shopping district and the hotel is also surrounded by the MOMO Department Store. The walking distance to the event venue, Taipei Arena, is five minutes.

== Qualification ==
Skaters were eligible for the event if they were representing a non-European ISU member nation and had reached the age of 15 before 1 July 2013 in their place of birth. The corresponding competition for European skaters was the 2014 European Figure Skating Championships. National associations selected their entries according to their own criteria but the ISU mandated that their selections achieve a minimum technical elements score (TES) at an international event prior to the European Championships.

Unlike the European event, national associations at Four Continents are all allowed three entries in each discipline, regardless of how their skaters placed at the previous year's event.

Minimum technical scores (TES)
Discipline	SP / SD	FS / FD
Men	25	45
Ladies	20	36
Pairs	20	36
Ice dancing	18	28
Must be achieved at an ISU-recognized international event in the ongoing or preceding season. SP and FS scores may be attained at different events.

== Entries ==
Country	Men	Ladies	Pairs	Ice dancing
Australia	Andrew Dodds; Brendan Kerry; David Kranjec	Brooklee Han		Danielle O'Brien / Gregory Merriman
Canada	Elladj Balde; Nam Nguyen; Jeremy Ten	Alaine Chartrand; Amelie Lacoste; Veronik Mallet	Margaret Purdy / Michael Marinaro; Natasha Purich / Mervin Tran	Piper Gilles / Paul Poirier; Nicole Orford / Thomas Williams; Kharis Ralph / Asher Hill
China	Song Nan; Wang Yi; Guan Jinlin	Li Zijun; Zhang Kexin; Zhao Ziquan	Sui Wenjing / Han Cong; Wang Wenting / Zhang Yan	Wang Shiyue / Liu Xinyu; Zhang Yiyi / Wu Nan; Zhao Yue / Liu Chang
Chinese Taipei	Jui-Shu Chen; Jordan Ju; Chih-I Tsao	Crystal Kiang		
Hong Kong	Ronald Lam			
India		Ami Parekh		
Japan	Takahiko Kozuka; Takahito Mura; Keiji Tanaka	Haruka Imai; Satoko Miyahara; Kanako Murakami		Emi Hirai / Marien de la Asuncion
Kazakhstan	Abzal Rakimgaliev; Denis Ten			Ksenia Korobkova / Daryn Zhunussov
Malaysia	Julian Zhi Jie Yee			
Mexico		Reyna Hamui		Pilar Maekawa Moreno / Leonardo Maekawa Moreno
Philippines	Christopher Caluza; Maverick Eguia; Michael Christian Martinez	Alisson Krystle Perticheto		
South Korea	Lee Dong-won; Lee June-hyoung; Kim Jin-seo	Kim Hae-jin; Kim Tae-kyung; Park So-youn		Yura Min / Timothy Koleto
South Africa		Lejeanne Marais		
United States	Richard Dornbush; Joshua Farris; Adam Rippon	Samantha Cesario; Courtney Hicks; Mirai Nagasu	Haven Denney / Brandon Frazier; Tarah Kayne / Daniel O'Shea; Alexa Scimeca / Chris Knierim	Alexandra Aldridge / Daniel Eaton; Madison Hubbell / Zachary Donohue; Lynn Kriengkrairut / Logan Giuletti-Schmitt
Uzbekistan	Misha Ge			Elizaveta Tretiakov / Viktor Kovalenko

=== Withdrawals and replacements ===
Early withdrawals included Brazil's Isadora Williams and Singapore's Ceciliane Hartmann. Neither were replaced. A couple of days before the start of official practices, China's Yan Han was replaced by Guan Jinlin and Chinese Taipei's Melanie Yuung-Hui Chang withdrew and was not replaced. On January 20, Chinese pair team Yu Xiaoyu / Jin Yang withdrew as well. During the men's short program South Korea's Kim Jin-seo and the Philippines' Michael Christian Martinez withdrew from the competition.

== Schedule ==
All times are China Standard Time (UTC+8).

Day	Date	Start	Finish	Discipline	Event
Day 1	Wednesday, 22 January	12:00	14:15	Ice dancing	Short dance
Day 1	Wednesday, 22 January	13:00	16:10	Pairs	Short program
Day 1	Wednesday, 22 January	17:00	17:30		Opening ceremony
Day 1	Wednesday, 22 January	17:50	22:10	Men	Short program
Day 2	Thursday, 23 January	13:30	16:00	Ice dancing	Free dance
Day 2	Thursday, 23 January	16:00	16:15	Ice dancing	Victory ceremony
Day 2	Thursday, 23 January	17:15	20:40	Ladies	Short program
Day 3	Friday, 24 January	14:45	16:10	Pairs	Free skating
Day 3	Friday, 24 January	16:10	16:25	Pairs	Victory ceremony
Day 3	Friday, 24 January	17:35	21:40	Men	Free skating
Day 3	Friday, 24 January	21:40	21:55	Men	Victory ceremony
Day 4	Saturday, 25 January	12:00	15:55	Ladies	Free skating
Day 4	Saturday, 25 January	15:55	16:10	Ladies	Victory ceremony
Day 4	Saturday, 25 January	17:00	19:00		Exhibition gala

== Overview ==
None of the 2013 champions competed, electing to prepare for the 2014 Winter Olympics. Only one medalist from 2013 competed — Kanako Murakami of Japan, who won bronze in ladies' singles. Han Yan of China, who won the 2013 bronze in men's singles, was originally on the roster but was replaced.

== Competition recap ==
=== Day one ===
==== Ice dancing: Short dance ====
The competition began with the short dance with fifteen ice dancing teams from nine nations competing. In a relatively tight field, it was a battle between the North American teams who didn't qualify for the 2014 Winter Olympics. Canada's Piper Gilles / Paul Poirier won the segment with a score of 62.38 points, 1.35 points ahead of Madison Hubbell / Zachary Donohue of the United States. Their component marks were extremely close but the Americans' Level 2 and below average execution of their sequential twizzles allowed the Canadians to take the lead. In an interview after the event, Gilles said, "I'd say this is our best performance yet. We've had a little bit of an injury earlier this year, so we've been pushed back a little bit with our training time. We finally feel like we're starting to peak and we're very happy with what we did." Hubbell stated, "Today's performance was shaky in parts. We obviously made an error during our twizzles sequences. Some things have improved. We got level four on both sides of the Finnstep and we're happy about that. All in all I think that we have improvement to make during our free dance and that’s really our strong point. So we're looking forward to tomorrow."

American dance team Alexandra Aldridge / Daniel Eaton had a strong debut at their first senior ISU Championship with a third-place finish and a score of 57.65. "Because of the quick turn around from Nationals we could come here and use our great skate and the hype from Nationals to come here and skate to the best of our ability. We feel really fortunate to be here", Aldridge commented.

Canada's Kharis Ralph / Asher Hill (53.97) and Nicole Orford / Thomas Williams (53.73) placed fourth and fifth respectively with only a 0.24 point gap between them. The American team of Lynn Kriengkrairut / Logan Giuletti-Schmitt did not obtain high levels and placed sixth with 49.55 points.

==== Pairs: Short program ====
The next event was the pairs' short program with seven teams from three nations competing. China's Sui Wenjing / Han Cong took a decisive lead, scoring 75.26 points for their program to La Strada. Executing all elements with high positive grades of execution (GOE) as well as being rewarded with the highest levels of difficulty for those elements (Level Four), they earned a 9.22 point lead over America's Alexa Scimeca / Chris Knierim. After competing, Han said, "Even though we got a really high score today, we thought we were not even close to perfect. I thought that the quality of the elements still could be improved. Our strategy for this season was to showcase a more mature side of us with refined movements and a dramatic storyline." Scimeca stated, "Honestly, we struggled a lot this season with our short program and this was our last one for the season and goal was to make it the best, so we're really proud that we did. I was actually nervous, but my difference was that I tried not to hold back."

Americans Tarah Kayne / Daniel O'Shea took the third spot with a score of 62.05 points. Kayne stated, "Our placement is surprising, however, how we skated to us isn't a surprise. We train every day a certain way. Today we went out and put out what we train. It's a good feeling to put out what you train and to feel strong on the ice." 2013 World Junior champions Haven Denney / Brandon Frazier finished fourth with 58.57 points, in striking distance of the podium. The remaining Canadian and Chinese teams rounded out the field.

==== Men: Short program ====
The final event of the day was the men's short program. In a narrow field, Japan's Takahito Mura won the segment with a 4t, 3A, and 3Lz combo and solid component marks, earning 84.21 points. Mur stated, "I couldn't qualify for the Olympic Games and originally I wasn't going to the Four Continents Championships. I was really disappointed. So when I got to go to this competition, I was really positive about it and I have been doing well. The short program was really good. Since I am here I am enjoying the practices and I when I went out to compete I was in a good mood and confident. I was really dancing without thinking about anything else. That's why the short program went really well."

Another skater who missed the opportunity to compete at the 2014 Winter Olympics was 22-year-old Richard Dornbush from Carona, California. Although his 4S was deemed under-rotated, he executed his remaining jumping passes confidently and achieving the highest levels of difficulty in all his non-jumping elements to score 82.13 points, just over two points away from the lead. He also had the highest presentation score in the short program. Dornbush commented, "Going to the short, I wasn't really focused on placement or anything. I was really focused on the program and I knew what I needed was a good attempt on the quad and skate the rest of the program cleanly and I was able to do that. I think that it was a good confidence boost, but mostly I think after a good short I just need to get down on my knees and focus on the long."

China's Song Nan took third place. Despite high levels in his spins and step sequences and a clean 4T combination, his hiccup on his 3A cost him nearly two points and he settled for a total of 78.71 points. Song said, "I brought out my A game. The quad toe was really good, so I kind of relaxed and I stumbled on the triple Axel. I am not nervous at all for the free skating. I feel really confident."

Takahiko Kozuka (JPN) ranked fourth (76.85 points), just ahead of 2013 World silver medalist Denis Ten (KAZ) with 76.34 points while Jeremy Ten (CAN) round out the top six with 75.21 points.

Kim Jin-seo (KOR) withdrew before the segment due to injury (tendonitis in his left foot) and Michael Christian Martinez (PHI) did not appear.

=== Day two ===
==== Ice dancing: Free dance ====
The second day of competition began with the free dance, with Canadians Piper Gilles / Paul Poirier and Americans Madison Hubbell / Zachary Donohue battling for the gold. Skating to "Nocturne into Bohemian Rhapsody", Hubbell/Donohue won the free dance by nearly six points. Receiving the highest levels of difficulty for all their elements (except their combination spin and one of their step sequences), as well as high grades of execution (GOE), the American team coached by Pasquale Camerlengo and Anjelika Krylova earned a personal best score of 97.20 points and an overall total of 158.25 points. After the event, Hubbell stated, "It means a lot. We've learned a tremendous amount about our partnership this season. We had a pretty stellar year our first year together and since then it has been a little bit of a struggle to find our way. I feel that we finally have proven ourselves as a strong, consistent team that deserves to be at the top. We can't wait until next season and keep pushing higher."

Gilles / Poirier also had a strong free dance, skating to music from the "Hitchcock" soundtrack. Despite earning similar PCS as Hubbell/Donohue, they lost valuable levels in both required step sequences, costing them nearly six points. They earned 91.33 points for the segment and a total of 153.71 points. Poirier commented, "We've had a seasons best in both programs, that's definitely more than we can ask for. I think today the performance was a bit tight, compared to the times we've done it in the past, but there were some positive things to take out of this. We're going to take this competition with us, because it taught us a lot about resilience and about being able to come back so quickly after Nationals. Overall it’s been a really positive experience and we are pleased with the results."

The bronze medal went to 2013 World Junior bronze medalists Alexandra Aldridge / Daniel Eaton. Their Indian dance-inspired program earned them a segment score of 87.30 points, giving them a total competition score of 144.95. Aldridge stated, "We're so excited and so honored to just be on the podium. We couldn't ask for much more, this being our first season as a senior team."

Canada's Kharis Ralph / Asher Hill remained in fourth place with a total of 137.03 points while fellow Canadians Nicole Orford / Thomas Williams came fifth (total of 133.42 points) ahead of Lynn Kriengkrairut / Logan Giuletti-Schmitt of the United States who finished sixth with a total of 130.05 points. The highest-ranked team from outside North America was Australia's Danielle O'Brien / Gregory Merriman who moved up from tenth in the short dance into seventh place after the free dance, scoring a total of 121.44 points.

==== Ladies: Short program ====
The final event of the day was the ladies' short program with 21 skaters from eleven nations competing. Japan's Kanako Murakami won the segment, China's Li Zijun came second, and Haruka Imai, also from Japan, took the third spot. Skating to "Violin Muse" by Ikuko Kawai, Murakami landed a 3T-3T combination, 3F, and 2A, while her spins and footwork all merited a level four. The 2013 Four Continents bronze medalist scored a season's best of 64.73 points and commented, "I didn't want to come to Four Continents but now I'm glad I came here. I don't know what's going to happen in the free skating, but I'll try my best and I'm aiming at a specific score that I have in my head."

Skating to a tango, Li produced a 3F-3T combination, 3Lz, and two level-four spins as well as level-four steps, earning a personal best of 62.84 points. She stated, "I'm really excited, because I never landed that combination in competition. I prepared a long time for the Four Continents Championships and it is thanks to my training that I was able to perform so well." Imai, who skated last, turned in a strong performance to "Song Without Words" by Felix Mendelssohn featuring a 3S-3T combination, 3Lo, and two level-four spins, obtaining a personal best as well with 62.72 points. She commented, "Even before my performance I could hear the applause and it made me feel that I'm not alone but that my fans are with me. I got more than 60 points for the first time and it was like a triumph for me."

Japan's Satoko Miyahara ranked fourth in the segment with 60.27 points while South Korea's Kim Hae-jin came fifth (57.48 points) and American Samantha Cesario placed sixth (57.40).

=== Day three ===
==== Pairs: Free skating ====
The third day of competition began with the pairs' free skating. China's Sui Wenjing / Han Cong took the Four Continents title with another decisive score, while Americans Tarah Kayne / Daniel O'Shea moved up to take the silver and team mates Alexa Scimeca / Chris Knierim dropped a notch to take third.

Skating to Kalinka, Sui / Han performed a quadruple twist, SBS 3T-2T-2T, SBS 3S, throw 3F, and throw 3S. They earned a level four for two lifts, their spins and the death spiral to score a personal best of 137.14 points. Overall, the three-time World Junior champions accumulated 212.40 points. Han commented, "Today we gave our very best performance for the audience and the judges. We are very pleased to have achieved a personal best score." Sui added, "I am very happy to have landed the triple Salchow, because in practice my success rate is not so high. I was lucky. Overall I am very pleased with our success."

Performing to Don Quixote, Kayne / O'Shea produced a SBS 3S, throw 3Lo, and throw 3S, as well as three level-four lifts, but O'Shea fell after he caught his partner on the triple twist. The Floridians scored 119.40 points for the segment and 181.45 overall to move up one spot and take silver in their debut at an ISU Championship. O'Shea stated, "We started this year with three senior Bs and medaled in all three of those. To come here and gain a medal, it feels really good to show what we can do. Hopefully there is more to come in the future." Asked about the fall after the triple twist, he said, "It is a silly mistake, not something that happens very often and I was happy to be able to come back from it. I just tripped over my own feet."

Scimeca/Knierim's program to Ever After included a high triple twist and difficult lifts, but he struggled with the SBS jumps while she stumbled on the throw triple loop. The team from Colorado Springs earned a segment score of 104.31 points and slipped to third with 170.35 points overall. Knierim commented, "We didn't put our best performance out in the free skating, so that's a little disappointing. But we had a good short. So I think overall it was an okay event for us. We're just excited to get the opportunity to come here and get the bronze medal."

2013 World Junior Champions Haven Denney / Brandon Frazier of the United States remained in fourth place with a total of 167.10 points while Canada's Natasha Purich / Mervin Tran moved up from seventh to fifth (147.80 points).

==== Men: Free skating ====
The men's free skating was the next event. Of the 24 skaters, eleven attempted quadruple jumps but few were successful. One of the skaters to land it was Japan's Takahito Mura who won the Four Continents title while teammate Takahiko Kozuka rose from fourth to earn the silver medal and China's Song Nan took the bronze. Mura's program to Shogun included a 4T, 3Lz-3T, two 3A, as well as four more triples, but the last two were somewhat shaky. The spins merited level threes and four. The 22-year-old scored a season's best for the segment, 158.35 points, and accumulated 242.56 points overall. He commented, "I truly was happy after my performance. During the six minutes warm up I was really worried. I had too much power and I tensed up. I was really tired when I did the last two jumps (in the program). Overall I was able to perform well, especially the steps and things I had to be careful about. After Nationals I forgot what it felt like to jump but at Four Continents I was able to accomplish what I wasn’t able to do at Nationals and that’s what I want to do in the future for my career."

Skating to Introduction et Rondo Capriccioso, Kozuka two-footed his opening 4T attempt that was downgraded, but he rallied to produce six triples including two 3A as well as three level-four spins. The 24-year-old won the segment with a season's best of 159.53 points and moved up to second with a total of 236.38 points. The 2011 World silver medalist said, "I had a very difficult time after I wasn't chosen for the Olympic team. I questioned why I was skating for all this time but I able to come out of it for the Four Continents. I kept thinking about my fans. There were so many people that came from Japan and I'm such a happy man to have all these fans. I felt I'm not a man if I can't perform successfully tonight."

Song completed a 4T, 3A-3T, 3A, and three more triples and two-level four spins in his program to The Mission. The 23-year-old picked up 157.38 points for his effort and claimed his first medal at a senior-level ISU championship with 236.09 points overall. He commented, "I made some mistakes on the jumps such as tripling the planned second quad. So I lost some points there. But overall I feel honored to be on the podium."

2013 World silver medalist Denis Ten placed fourth with a total of 226.37 points while Richard Dornbush of the United States dropped from second to fifth with 224.44 points and Joshua Farris came sixth (221.00 points).

=== Day four ===
==== Ladies: Free skating ====
The 2014 Four Continents Championships concluded with the ladies' free skating. Kanako Murakami of Japan claimed the gold medal while teammate Satoko Miyahara rose from fourth to take the silver medal, and Li Zijun of China took the bronze.

Skating to Papa Can You Hear Me, Murakami landed a 3T-3T combination, 3Lz, and four more triples. The three spins and the footwork earned level fours. The 19-year-old set a new personal best score of 132.18 points in the segment and accumulated a total of 196.91 points to win her first senior-level ISU Championship. Murakami said, "This is an important competition and winning here means the next step for me. I was able to do the best performance that I can do at the moment. At all other championships I have been to my score wasn't as high as I expected, even if I didn't make mistakes. I know I still have some problems I need to fix, but I was very glad I came here to Four Continents."

Miyahara delivered a strong performance to the flamenco piece Poeta, landing seven triples including a 3Lz-3T and a 2A-3T combination and earning a level four for two spins. The 15-year-old posted a personal best score of 126.26 points for the segment and a total of 186.53 points, finishing on the podium in her debut at a senior ISU Championship. She stated, "This event I was the most nerve-wracking for me. I know this will be a great start for the next season. Today's performance made me gain confidence. I didn't care about my placement. Being second doesn't really matter to me, the most important thing was to do the best I could."

Li's program to Coppelia featured five solid triples as well as level-three spins and footwork. Although she improved her season's best significantly with 118.72 points, it was not enough to hold on to second place as she earned 181.56 points overall. She said, "I missed the first triple-triple combination, and the landing of the double Axel was shaky. I have to say I was still not in my best condition. I would like to make sure to bring out the best side of me at the Olympics."

Haruka Imai (JPN) slipped from third to fourth (175.40 points overall) while Courtney Hicks (USA) moved up from seventh to fifth (169.99 points) and Kim Hae-jin (KOR) finished sixth (166.84 points).

== Results ==
=== Men ===
==== Final results ====
Rank	Name	Nation	Total points	SP		FS	
1	Takahito Mura	Japan	242.56	1	84.21	2	158.35
2	Takahiko Kozuka	Japan	236.38	4	76.85	1	159.53
3	Song Nan	China	236.09	3	78.71	3	157.38
4	Denis Ten	Kazakhstan	226.37	5	76.34	4	150.03
5	Richard Dornbush	United States	224.44	2	82.13	7	142.31
6	Joshua Farris	United States	221.00	7	74.85	5	146.15
7	Guan Jinlin	China	214.26	9	71.06	6	143.20
8	Adam Rippon	United States	213.20	8	72.90	8	140.30
9	Jeremy Ten	Canada	208.51	6	75.21	11	133.30
10	Nam Nguyen	Canada	204.69	10	68.17	10	136.52
11	Elladj Baldé	Canada	201.45	13	64.33	9	137.12
12	Christopher Caluza	Philippines	191.21	11	67.84	13	123.37
13	Misha Ge	Uzbekistan	188.41	12	65.26	14	123.15
14	Lee June-hyoung	South Korea	184.14	19	57.65	12	126.49
15	Abzal Rakimgaliev	Kazakhstan	184.13	15	62.25	15	121.88
16	Wang Yi	China	179.52	17	61.13	16	118.39
17	Keiji Tanaka	Japan	178.91	14	62.61	17	116.30
18	Chih-I Tsao	Chinese Taipei	166.73	22	51.12	18	115.61
19	Lee Dong-won	South Korea	166.73	16	61.16	19	105.57
20	Brendan Kerry	Australia	163.37	18	59.00	20	104.37
21	David Kranjec	Australia	156.50	20	52.36	21	104.14
22	Jordan Ju	Chinese Taipei	152.46	21	52.17	22	100.29
23	Julian Zhi Jie Yee	Malaysia	137.56	23	49.29	24	88.27
24	Maverick Eguia	Philippines	136.99	24	46.74	23	90.25
Did not advance to Free Skating
25	Jui-Shu Chen	Chinese Taipei		25	46.13		
26	Ronald Lam	Hong Kong		26	45.59		
27	Andrew Dodds	Australia		27	42.19		
WD	Kim Jin-seo	South Korea					
WD	Michael Christian Martinez	Philippines					

==== Short program ====
Pl.	Name	Nation	TSS	TES	PCS	SS	TR	PE	CH	IN	Ded.	StN.
1	Takahito Mura	Japan	84.21	46.50	37.71	7.71	7.25	7.82	7.50	7.43	0.00	#27
2	Richard Dornbush	United States	82.13	43.56	38.57	7.71	7.50	7.71	7.86	7.79	0.00	#22
3	Song Nan	China	78.71	44.35	34.36	7.00	6.61	6.96	6.86	6.93	0.00	#18
4	Takahiko Kozuka	Japan	76.85	37.86	38.99	7.96	7.71	7.64	7.86	7.82	0.00	#24
5	Denis Ten	Kazakhstan	76.34	39.13	38.21	7.75	7.46	7.54	7.75	7.71	1.00	#20
6	Jeremy Ten	Canada	75.21	40.57	34.64	6.82	6.75	7.07	6.96	7.04	0.00	#10
7	Joshua Farris	United States	74.85	37.64	37.21	7.39	7.32	7.46	7.50	7.54	0.00	#19
8	Adam Rippon	United States	72.90	35.94	36.96	7.43	7.21	7.32	7.50	7.50	1.00	#23
9	Guan Jinlin	China	71.06	39.03	32.03	6.46	6.14	6.54	6.46	6.43	0.00	#6
10	Nam Nguyen	Canada	68.17	38.23	29.94	5.86	5.61	6.29	6.11	6.07	0.00	#16
11	Christopher Caluza	Philippines	67.84	35.84	32.00	6.21	6.36	6.61	6.43	6.39	0.00	#28
12	Misha Ge	Uzbekistan	65.26	32.58	33.68	6.61	6.46	6.82	6.75	7.04	1.00	#21
13	Elladj Balde	Canada	64.33	34.69	29.64	6.07	5.54	6.14	5.96	5.93	0.00	#8
14	Keiji Tanaka	Japan	62.61	30.32	32.29	6.64	6.29	6.36	6.54	6.46	0.00	#25
15	Abzal Rakimgaliev	Kazakhstan	62.25	32.90	29.35	5.89	5.61	5.96	5.93	5.96	0.00	#29
16	Lee Dong-won	South Korea	61.16	34.89	26.27	5.46	4.96	5.32	5.39	5.14	0.00	#9
17	Wang Yi	China	61.13	32.49	29.64	6.07	5.68	5.89	6.04	5.96	1.00	#14
18	Brendan Kerry	Australia	59.00	29.64	29.36	5.96	5.64	5.79	6.04	5.93	0.00	#3
19	Lee June-hyoung	South Korea	57.65	30.72	26.93	5.61	5.25	5.21	5.43	5.43	0.00	#17
20	David Kranjec	Australia	52.36	26.31	27.05	5.43	5.18	5.36	5.54	5.54	1.00	#7
21	Jordan Ju	Chinese Taipei	52.17	26.41	25.76	5.18	5.00	5.29	5.25	5.04	0.00	#11
22	Chih-I Tsao	Chinese Taipei	51.12	27.58	25.54	5.18	5.04	5.00	5.21	5.11	2.00	#12
23	Julian Zhi Jie Yee	Malaysia	49.29	26.50	22.79	4.54	4.32	4.68	4.71	4.54	0.00	#13
24	Maverick Eguia	Philippines	46.74	24.42	22.32	4.54	4.32	4.57	4.50	4.39	0.00	#5
25	Jui-Shu Chen	Chinese Taipei	46.13	24.53	21.60	4.46	4.00	4.50	4.32	4.32	0.00	#2
26	Ronald Lam	Hong Kong	45.59	23.05	23.54	4.93	4.43	4.71	4.79	4.68	1.00	#4
27	Andrew Dodds	Australia	42.19	20.79	23.40	4.93	4.46	4.61	4.86	4.54	2.00	#1
WD	Kim Jin-seo	South Korea										#15
WD	Michael Christian Martinez	Philippines										#26

==== Free skating ====
Pl.	Name	Nation	TSS	TES	PCS	SS	TR	PE	CH	IN	Ded.	StN.
1	Takahiko Kozuka	Japan	159.53	77.17	82.36	8.43	8.11	8.14	8.29	8.21	0.00	#23
2	Takahito Mura	Japan	158.35	82.41	75.94	7.71	7.18	7.93	7.61	7.54	0.00	#21
3	Song Nan	China	157.38	81.60	75.78	7.71	7.29	7.75	7.57	7.57	0.00	#24
4	Denis Ten	Kazakhstan	150.03	73.95	78.08	7.86	7.64	7.54	8.04	7.96	2.00	#19
5	Joshua Farris	United States	146.15	71.71	75.44	7.54	7.36	7.36	7.75	7.71	1.00	#13
6	Guan Jinlin	China	143.20	73.62	69.58	7.04	6.79	6.86	7.14	6.96	0.00	#14
7	Richard Dornbush	United States	142.31	67.83	75.48	7.71	7.39	7.43	7.64	7.57	1.00	#20
8	Adam Rippon	United States	140.30	64.68	75.62	7.71	7.36	7.39	7.71	7.64	0.00	#17
9	Elladj Baldé	Canada	137.12	73.60	63.52	6.36	6.04	6.54	6.39	6.43	0.00	#9
10	Nam Nguyen	Canada	136.52	71.80	64.72	6.57	6.18	6.61	6.57	6.43	0.00	#15
11	Jeremy Ten	Canada	133.30	62.44	71.86	7.21	7.04	7.07	7.25	7.36	1.00	#22
12	Lee June-hyoung	South Korea	126.49	68.27	58.22	5.93	5.61	5.75	5.93	5.89	0.00	#6
13	Christopher Caluza	Philippines	123.37	58.87	64.50	6.32	6.25	6.50	6.57	6.61	0.00	#16
14	Misha Ge	Uzbekistan	123.15	57.13	68.02	6.61	6.54	6.79	6.86	7.21	2.00	#18
15	Abzal Rakimgaliev	Kazakhstan	121.88	65.66	56.22	5.68	5.36	5.68	5.68	5.71	0.00	#8
16	Wang Yi	China	118.39	58.69	59.70	6.21	5.86	5.89	6.07	5.82	0.00	#11
17	Keiji Tanaka	Japan	116.30	57.52	59.78	6.11	5.89	5.82	6.07	6.00	1.00	#12
18	Chih-I Tsao	Chinese Taipei	115.61	61.53	54.08	5.57	5.18	5.39	5.54	5.36	0.00	#3
19	Lee Dong-won	South Korea	105.57	56.15	49.42	5.61	4.54	4.96	4.89	4.71	0.00	#7
20	Brendan Kerry	Australia	104.37	46.03	58.34	5.96	5.86	5.50	6.14	5.71	0.00	#10
21	David Kranjec	Australia	104.14	51.64	52.50	5.25	5.04	5.32	5.39	5.25	0.00	#1
22	Jordan Ju	Chinese Taipei	100.29	51.29	49.00	4.89	4.79	4.79	5.07	4.96	0.00	#2
23	Maverick Eguia	Philippines	90.25	45.47	45.78	4.68	4.43	4.46	4.71	4.61	1.00	#5
24	Julian Zhi Jie Yee	Malaysia	88.27	45.03	43.24	4.54	4.04	4.32	4.43	4.29	0.00	#4

=== Ladies ===
==== Final results ====
Rank	Name	Nation	Total points	SP		FS	
1	Kanako Murakami	Japan	196.91	1	64.73	1	132.18
2	Satoko Miyahara	Japan	186.53	4	60.27	2	126.26
3	Li Zijun	China	181.56	2	62.84	3	118.72
4	Haruka Imai	Japan	175.40	3	62.72	6	112.68
5	Courtney Hicks	United States	169.99	7	56.36	4	113.63
6	Kim Hae-jin	South Korea	166.84	5	57.48	7	109.36
7	Alaine Chartrand	Canada	165.19	15	52.14	5	113.05
8	Samantha Cesario	United States	164.87	6	57.40	8	107.47
9	Park So-youn	South Korea	162.71	8	55.91	9	106.80
10	Mirai Nagasu	United States	159.78	9	55.39	10	104.39
11	Zhang Kexin	China	157.57	12	54.49	11	103.08
12	Amélie Lacoste	Canada	156.17	10	55.19	12	100.98
13	Veronik Mallet	Canada	154.03	11	55.08	13	98.95
14	Brooklee Han	Australia	150.17	14	52.55	14	97.62
15	Zhao Ziquan	China	142.32	13	53.82	16	88.50
16	Kim Tae-kyung	South Korea	132.84	18	38.91	15	93.93
17	Alisson Krystle Perticheto	Philippines	114.95	16	47.81	19	67.14
18	Ami Parekh	India	110.66	17	41.10	18	69.56
19	Reyna Hamui	Mexico	110.26	21	32.49	17	77.77
20	Crystal Kiang	Chinese Taipei	103.26	19	36.30	20	66.96
21	Lejeanne Marais	South Africa	98.93	20	32.62	21	66.31

==== Short program ====
Pl.	Name	Nation	TSS	TES	PCS	SS	TR	PE	CH	IN	Ded.	StN.
1	Kanako Murakami	Japan	64.73	35.64	29.09	7.57	6.96	7.36	7.25	7.21	0.00	#15
2	Li Zijun	China	62.84	35.81	27.03	6.82	6.43	6.93	6.79	6.82	0.00	#20
3	Haruka Imai	Japan	62.72	34.69	28.03	7.11	6.68	7.25	6.96	7.04	0.00	#21
4	Satoko Miyahara	Japan	60.27	34.07	26.20	6.61	6.46	6.57	6.68	6.43	0.00	#12
5	Kim Hae-jin	South Korea	57.48	32.34	25.14	6.46	5.79	6.43	6.32	6.43	0.00	#19
6	Samantha Cesario	United States	57.40	30.87	26.53	6.64	6.43	6.71	6.64	6.75	0.00	#18
7	Courtney Hicks	United States	56.36	29.54	26.82	6.96	6.39	6.64	6.86	6.68	0.00	#13
8	Park So-youn	South Korea	55.91	31.82	24.09	6.00	5.82	6.18	6.11	6.00	0.00	#4
9	Mirai Nagasu	United States	55.39	28.44	27.95	7.07	6.79	7.07	7.18	6.82	1.00	#16
10	Amelie Lacoste	Canada	55.19	28.96	26.23	6.79	6.29	6.50	6.71	6.50	0.00	#14
11	Veronik Mallet	Canada	55.08	30.63	24.45	6.00	5.93	6.25	6.18	6.21	0.00	#3
12	Zhang Kexin	China	54.49	31.14	23.35	6.29	5.64	5.86	5.86	5.54	0.00	#11
13	Zhao Ziquan	China	53.82	31.31	22.51	5.79	5.39	5.71	5.64	5.61	0.00	#6
14	Brooklee Han	Australia	52.55	28.18	24.37	6.04	6.11	6.18	6.18	5.96	0.00	#17
15	Alaine Chartrand	Canada	52.14	28.30	23.84	6.25	5.86	5.86	5.96	5.86	0.00	#8
16	Alisson Krystle Perticheto	Philippines	47.81	27.06	20.75	5.32	4.96	5.36	5.21	5.07	0.00	#7
17	Ami Parekh	India	41.10	23.41	17.69	4.61	4.00	4.61	4.46	4.43	0.00	#10
18	Kim Tae-kyung	South Korea	38.91	24.14	17.77	4.89	4.36	4.14	4.50	4.32	3.00	#1
19	Crystal Kiang	Chinese Taipei	36.30	18.96	17.34	4.25	4.04	4.39	4.39	4.61	0.00	#2
20	Lejeanne Marais	South Africa	32.62	17.19	16.43	4.18	3.96	4.04	4.25	4.11	1.00	#5
21	Reyna Hamui	Mexico	32.49	14.61	18.88	4.75	4.39	4.71	4.86	4.89	1.00	#9

==== Free skating ====
Pl.	Name	Nation	TSS	TES	PCS	SS	TR	PE	CH	IN	Ded.	StN.
1	Kanako Murakami	Japan	132.18	69.25	62.93	7.86	7.61	8.04	7.82	8.00	0.00	#20
2	Satoko Miyahara	Japan	126.26	68.76	57.50	7.14	7.04	7.29	7.36	7.11	0.00	#21
3	Li Zijun	China	118.72	61.46	57.26	7.18	6.96	7.21	7.25	7.18	0.00	#17
4	Courtney Hicks	United States	113.63	58.28	56.35	7.18	6.89	7.04	7.11	7.00	1.00	#14
5	Alaine Chartrand	Canada	113.05	62.56	50.59	6.36	6.11	6.36	6.43	6.39	0.00	#6
6	Haruka Imai	Japan	112.68	56.68	56.00	7.18	6.75	7.07	7.04	6.96	0.00	#19
7	Kim Hae-jin	South Korea	109.36	57.98	51.38	6.61	6.11	6.57	6.43	6.39	0.00	#16
8	Samantha Cesario	United States	107.47	51.52	55.95	6.75	6.79	7.04	7.18	7.21	0.00	#18
9	Park So-youn	South Korea	106.80	53.14	53.66	6.71	6.54	6.75	6.75	6.79	0.00	#15
10	Mirai Nagasu	United States	104.39	48.67	55.72	7.25	6.68	6.93	6.96	7.00	0.00	#13
11	Zhang Kexin	China	103.08	58.66	44.42	6.11	5.25	5.61	5.54	5.25	0.00	#8
12	Amelie Lacoste	Canada	100.98	49.08	51.90	6.64	6.36	6.36	6.54	6.54	0.00	#11
13	Veronik Mallet	Canada	98.95	50.61	50.34	6.46	6.11	6.25	6.32	6.32	2.00	#12
14	Brooklee Han	Australia	97.62	51.67	45.95	5.68	5.54	5.82	5.93	5.75	0.00	#7
15	Kim Tae-kyung	South Korea	93.93	56.84	37.09	5.25	4.25	4.82	4.50	4.36	0.00	#2
16	Zhao Ziquan	China	88.50	47.85	41.65	5.39	5.00	5.21	5.32	5.11	1.00	#9
17	Reyna Hamui	Mexico	77.77	41.07	37.70	4.89	4.43	4.82	4.79	4.64	1.00	#4
18	Ami Parekh	India	69.56	36.65	34.91	4.61	4.14	4.39	4.36	4.32	2.00	#3
19	Alisson Krystle Perticheto	Philippines	67.14	33.47	35.67	4.61	4.32	4.36	4.61	4.39	2.00	#10
20	Crystal Kiang	Chinese Taipei	66.96	32.55	34.41	4.29	4.07	4.43	4.29	4.43	0.00	#1
21	Lejeanne Marais	South Africa	66.31	32.31	34.00	4.18	4.07	4.43	4.32	4.25	0.00	#5

=== Pairs ===
==== Final results ====
Rank	Name	Nation	Total points	SP		FS	
1	Sui Wenjing / Han Cong	China	212.40	1	75.26	1	137.14
2	Tarah Kayne / Daniel O'Shea	United States	181.45	3	62.05	2	119.40
3	Alexa Scimeca / Chris Knierim	United States	170.35	2	66.04	4	104.31
4	Haven Denney / Brandon Frazier	United States	167.10	4	58.57	3	108.53
5	Natasha Purich / Mervin Tran	Canada	147.80	7	49.57	5	98.23
6	Margaret Purdy / Michael Marinaro	Canada	139.99	5	51.97	7	88.02
7	Wang Wenting / Zhang Yan	China	139.95	6	49.98	6	89.97

==== Short program ====
Pl.	Name	Nation	TSS	TES	PCS	SS	TR	PE	CH	IN	Ded.	StN.
1	Sui Wenjing / Han Cong	China	75.26	43.43	31.83	7.96	7.61	8.18	8.07	7.96	0.00	#6
2	Alexa Scimeca / Chris Knierim	United States	66.04	38.10	27.94	6.93	6.50	7.21	7.18	7.11	0.00	#5
3	Tarah Kayne / Daniel O'Shea	United States	62.05	35.80	26.25	6.57	6.18	6.75	6.68	6.64	0.00	#2
4	Haven Denney / Brandon Frazier	United States	58.57	32.82	25.75	6.61	6.11	6.39	6.64	6.46	0.00	#7
5	Margaret Purdy / Michael Marinaro	Canada	51.97	28.56	23.41	5.79	5.61	5.86	5.96	6.04	0.00	#4
6	Wang Wenting / Zhang Yan	China	49.98	28.30	21.68	5.68	5.25	5.50	5.50	5.18	0.00	#3
7	Natasha Purich / Mervin Tran	Canada	49.57	27.91	23.66	6.04	6.14	5.54	6.07	5.79	2.00	#1

==== Free skating ====
Pl.	Name	Nation	TSS	TES	PCS	SS	TR	PE	CH	IN	Ded.	StN.
1	Sui Wenjing / Han Cong	China	137.14	72.90	64.24	7.93	7.79	8.11	8.25	8.07	0.00	#4
2	Tarah Kayne / Daniel O'Shea	United States	119.40	62.23	58.17	7.07	6.93	7.43	7.39	7.54	1.00	#7
3	Haven Denney / Brandon Frazier	United States	108.53	56.28	53.25	6.61	6.21	6.89	6.82	6.75	1.00	#5
4	Alexa Scimeca / Chris Knierim	United States	104.31	50.76	54.55	6.89	6.57	6.71	6.96	6.96	1.00	#6
5	Natasha Purich / Mervin Tran	Canada	98.23	52.26	46.97	6.00	6.00	5.57	6.00	5.79	1.00	#1
6	Wang Wenting / Zhang Yan	China	89.97	48.35	41.62	5.61	4.79	5.25	5.36	5.00	0.00	#2
7	Margaret Purdy / Michael Marinaro	Canada	88.02	42.67	46.35	5.75	5.54	5.68	6.07	5.93	1.00	#3

=== Ice dancing ===
==== Final results ====
Rank	Name	Nation	Total points	SD		FD	
1	Madison Hubbell / Zachary Donohue	United States	158.25	2	61.05	1	97.20
2	Piper Gilles / Paul Poirier	Canada	153.71	1	62.38	2	91.33
3	Alexandra Aldridge / Daniel Eaton	United States	144.95	3	57.65	3	87.30
4	Kharis Ralph / Asher Hill	Canada	137.03	4	53.97	4	83.06
5	Nicole Orford / Thomas Williams	Canada	133.42	5	53.73	6	79.69
6	Lynn Kriengkrairut / Logan Giulietti-Schmitt	United States	130.05	6	49.55	5	80.50
7	Danielle O'Brien / Gregory Merriman	Australia	121.44	10	44.16	7	77.28
8	Zhang Yiyi / Wu Nan	China	116.34	9	44.60	8	71.74
9	Wang Shiyue / Liu Xinyu	China	115.66	7	46.81	9	68.85
10	Yura Min / Timothy Koleto	South Korea	111.23	8	45.12	10	66.11
~~11~~	~~Zhao Yue / Liu Chang~~	~~China~~	~~99.84~~	~~13~~	~~41.45~~	~~12~~	~~58.39~~
11	Emi Hirai / Marien de la Asuncion	Japan	99.82	11	44.11	13	55.71
12	Ksenia Korobkova / Daryn Zhunussov	Kazakhstan	98.79	13	39.80	11	58.99
13	Pilar Maekawa Moreno / Leonardo Maekawa Moreno	Mexico	97.11	12	43.22	14	53.89
14	Elizaveta Tretiakov / Viktor Kovalenko	Uzbekistan	91.76	14	35.68	12	56.08

- Zhao and Liu were later disqualified from the competition due to a positive doping sample from Liu.

==== Short dance ====
Pl.	Name	Nation	TSS	TES	PCS	SS	TR	PE	CH	IN	Ded.	StN.
1	Piper Gilles / Paul Poirier	Canada	62.38	32.92	29.46	7.36	7.21	7.32	7.46	7.43	0.00	#12
2	Madison Hubbell / Zachary Donohue	United States	61.05	31.57	29.48	7.39	7.18	7.25	7.50	7.46	0.00	#11
3	Alexandra Aldridge / Daniel Eaton	United States	57.65	31.36	26.29	6.57	6.43	6.54	6.64	6.64	0.00	#14
4	Kharis Ralph / Asher Hill	Canada	53.97	26.21	27.76	6.89	6.75	6.93	7.00	7.07	0.00	#15
5	Nicole Orford / Thomas Williams	Canada	53.73	27.22	25.61	6.46	6.36	6.71	6.75	6.79	0.00	#8
6	Lynn Kriengkrairut / Logan Giuletti-Schmitt	United States	49.55	25.57	23.98	5.93	5.75	6.14	6.00	6.11	0.00	#9
7	Wang Shiyue / Liu Xinyu	China	46.81	26.30	20.51	5.11	4.86	5.25	5.11	5.25	0.00	#3
8	Yura Min / Timothy Koleto	South Korea	45.12	26.42	18.70	4.71	4.46	4.75	4.75	4.68	0.00	#5
9	Zhang Yiyi / Wu Nan	China	44.60	25.35	19.25	5.00	4.54	4.93	4.75	4.82	0.00	#10
10	Danielle O'Brien / Gregory Merriman	Australia	44.16	21.71	23.45	5.89	5.79	5.75	5.96	5.89	1.00	#13
11	Emi Hirai / Marien de la Asuncion	Japan	44.11	24.07	20.04	5.04	4.71	5.11	5.07	5.07	0.00	#2
12	Pilar Maekawa Moreno / Leonardo Maekawa Moreno	Mexico	43.22	25.85	17.37	4.39	4.11	4.32	4.46	4.39	0.00	#4
~~13~~	~~Zhao Yue / Liu Chang~~	~~China~~	~~41.45~~	~~23.22~~	~~19.23~~	~~4.75~~	~~4.61~~	~~4.96~~	~~4.93~~	~~4.79~~	~~1.00~~	~~#6~~
13	Ksenia Korobkova / Daryn Zhunussov	Kazakhstan	39.80	22.42	17.38	4.39	4.18	4.36	4.46	4.32	0.00	#1
14	Elizaveta Tretiakov / Viktor Kovalenko	Uzbekistan	35.68	18.07	17.61	4.36	4.14	4.43	4.57	4.46	0.00	#7

==== Free dance ====
Pl.	Name	Nation	TSS	TES	PCS	SS	TR	PE	CH	IN	Ded.	StN.
1	Madison Hubbell / Zachary Donohue	United States	97.20	50.44	46.76	7.82	7.64	7.86	7.82	7.93	0.00	#15
2	Piper Gilles / Paul Poirier	Canada	91.33	45.79	45.54	7.61	7.43	7.64	7.71	7.68	0.00	#13
3	Alexandra Aldridge / Daniel Eaton	United States	87.30	45.53	41.77	6.93	6.82	6.96	7.14	7.07	0.00	#14
4	Kharis Ralph / Asher Hill	Canada	83.06	42.18	40.88	6.75	6.68	6.89	6.86	7.00	0.00	#11
5	Lynn Kriengkrairut / Logan Giuletti-Schmitt	United States	80.50	42.64	37.86	6.39	6.07	6.36	6.46	6.63	0.00	#9
6	Nicole Orford / Thomas Williams	Canada	79.69	38.42	41.27	6.82	6.71	7.00	6.96	7.04	0.00	#12
7	Danielle O'Brien / Gregory Merriman	Australia	77.28	41.79	35.49	5.82	5.75	6.00	6.04	6.11	0.00	#8
8	Zhang Yiyi / Wu Nan	China	71.74	41.56	31.18	5.29	5.00	5.36	5.25	5.21	1.00	#6
9	Wang Shiyue / Liu Xinyu	China	68.85	35.94	32.91	5.57	5.25	5.54	5.61	5.61	0.00	#6
10	Yura Min / Timothy Koleto	South Korea	66.11	36.45	29.66	5.11	4.71	5.07	5.00	4.96	0.00	#7
11	Ksenia Korobkova / Daryn Zhunussov	Kazakhstan	58.99	32.79	26.20	4.39	4.18	4.39	4.57	4.43	0.00	#3
~~12~~	~~Zhao Yue / Liu Chang~~	~~China~~	~~48.39~~	~~31.38~~	~~27.01~~	~~4.57~~	~~4.21~~	~~4.61~~	~~4.71~~	~~4.61~~	~~0.00~~	~~#5~~
12	Elizaveta Tretiakov / Viktor Kovalenko	Uzbekistan	56.08	30.22	25.86	4.36	4.11	4.32	4.54	4.36	0.00	#2
13	Emi Hirai / Marien de la Asuncion	Japan	55.71	31.25	27.46	4.79	4.39	4.61	4.64	4.54	3.00	#1
14	Pilar Maekawa Moreno / Leonardo Maekawa Moreno	Mexico	53.89	29.23	26.66	4.39	4.39	4.32	4.71	4.46	2.00	#4

== Medals summary ==
=== Medalists ===
Medals awarded to the skaters who achieve the highest overall placements in each discipline:

Discipline	Gold	Silver	Bronze
Men	(Japan) Takahito Mura	(Japan) Takahiko Kozuka	(China) Song Nan
Ladies	(Japan) Kanako Murakami	(Japan) Satoko Miyahara	(China) Li Zijun
Pair skating	(China) Sui Wenjing / Han Cong	(United States) Tarah Kayne / Daniel O'Shea	(United States) Alexa Scimeca / Chris Knierim
Ice dancing	(United States) Madison Hubbell / Zachary Donohue	(Canada) Piper Gilles / Paul Poirier	(United States) Alexandra Aldridge / Daniel Eaton

Small medals awarded to the skaters who achieve the highest short program or short dance placements in each discipline:

Discipline	Gold	Silver	Bronze
Men	(Japan) Takahito Mura	(United States) Richard Dornbush	(China) Song Nan
Ladies	(Japan) Kanako Murakami	(China) Li Zijun	(Japan) Haruka Imai
Pair skating	(China) Sui Wenjing / Han Cong	(United States) Alexa Scimeca / Chris Knierim	(United States) Tarah Kayne / Daniel O'Shea
Ice dancing	(Canada) Piper Gilles / Paul Poirier	(United States) Madison Hubbell / Zachary Donohue	(United States) Alexandra Aldridge / Daniel Eaton

Medals awarded to the skaters who achieve the highest free skating or free dance placements in each discipline:

Discipline	Gold	Silver	Bronze
Men	(Japan) Takahiko Kozuka	(Japan) Takahito Mura	(China) Song Nan
Ladies	(Japan) Kanako Murakami	(Japan) Satoko Miyahara	(China) Li Zijun
Pair skating	(China) Sui Wenjing / Han Cong	(United States) Tarah Kayne / Daniel O'Shea	(United States) Haven Denney / Brandon Frazier
Ice dancing	(United States) Madison Hubbell / Zachary Donohue	(Canada) Piper Gilles / Paul Poirier	(United States) Alexandra Aldridge / Daniel Eaton

=== Medals by country ===
Table of medals for overall placement:

Rank	Nation	Gold	Silver	Bronze	Total
1	Japan (JPN)	2	2	0	4
2	United States (USA)	1	1	2	4
3	China (CHN)	1	0	2	3
4	Canada (CAN)	0	1	0	1
Totals (4 entries)		4	4	4	12

== Prize money ==
Prize money is awarded to skaters who achieve a top 12 placement in each discipline as follows:

	Prize money (US$)	
Placement	Men's / Ladies' singles	Pairs / Ice dancers
1st	15,000	22,500
2nd	9,000	13,500
3rd	6,000	9,000
4th	4,500	6,750
5th	3,250	5,000
6th	2,500	3,750
7th	2,250	3,500
8th	2,000	3,000
9th	1,750	2,500
10th	1,500	2,250
11th	1,250	1,750
12th	1,000	1,500
Pairs and ice dancing couples split the amount. Total prize money: $250,000 USD.

== See also ==
- List of sporting events in Taiwan
