= Chris Knierim =

American pair figure skater (born 1987)

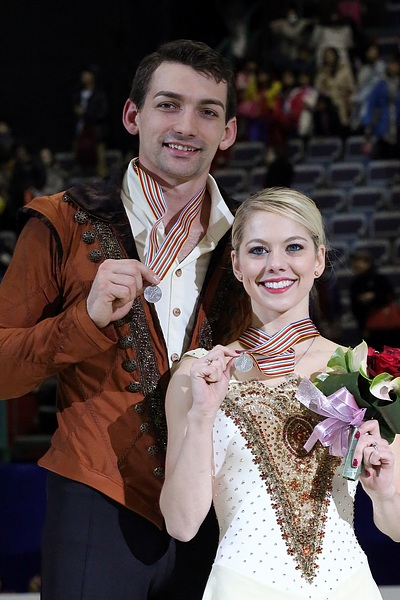
- Alexa and Chris Knierim at the 2016 Four Continents Championships

Personal information
- Full name: Christopher Knierim
- Born: November 5, 1987 (age 39) Tucson, Arizona, U.S.
- Home town: Irvine, California, U.S.
- Height: 6 ft 2 in (1.87 m)

Figure skating career
- Country: United States
- Discipline: Pair skating
- Partner: Alexa Scimeca Knierim (2012–20); Andrea Poapst (2010–12); Carolyn-Ann Alba (2009–10); Brynn Carman (2008–09)
- Began skating: 2000
- Retired: February 26, 2020
Olympic Games
Bronze medal – third place	2018 Pyeongchang	Team
Four Continents Championships
Silver medal – second place	2016 Taipei	Pairs
Bronze medal – third place	2014 Taipei	Pairs
U.S. Championships
Gold medal – first place	2015 Greensboro	Pairs
Gold medal – first place	2018 San Jose	Pairs
Gold medal – first place	2020 Greensboro	Pairs
Silver medal – second place	2013 Omaha	Pairs
Silver medal – second place	2016 Saint Paul	Pairs
World Team Trophy
Gold medal – first place	2015 Tokyo	Team

Christopher Knierim (born November 5, 1987) is an American former pair skater. With his wife, Alexa Scimeca Knierim, he is a 2018 Olympic bronze medalist in the figure skating team event, a two-time Four Continents medalist (2016 silver, 2014 bronze), a three-time Grand Prix medalist (1 silver, 2 bronze), and a three-time U.S. National Champion (2015, 2018, 2020). At the 2018 Winter Olympics, the Knierims became the first American pair, and the second pair ever in history, to perform a quad twist at the Olympic Games.

== Personal life ==
Christopher Knierim was born November 5, 1987, in Tucson, Arizona. When he was six months old, his mother DeeDee began dating her future husband, Jeffrey Knierim, who adopted Chris. His family lived in Ramona, California, before moving to Colorado Springs, Colorado, in 2006 to focus on Knierim's skating career.

In addition to skating, Knierim worked as an auto mechanic. Knierim and Alexa Scimeca became skating partners in April 2012, and began dating about a month later. They became engaged on April 8, 2014, and married on June 26, 2016, in Colorado Springs, Colorado. Their skating partnership ended in February 2020.

Following his retirement, Knierim worked as a figure skating coach in Irvine, California, before he and his wife moved to Chicago, Illinois in 2023 after he took a job as a skating director at the Oakton Edge Skating Academy. The pair also coach there.

In July 2025, the Knierims welcomed a son, Braxton Jeffery Knierim.

== Skating career ==
=== Early career ===
Knierim started skating at age 12. He began a partnership with Brynn Carman in February 2006. They were coached by Dalilah Sappenfield in Colorado Springs, Colorado. The pair won the novice national title at the 2008 U.S. Championships and the junior silver medal at the 2009 U.S. Championships. They announced the end of their partnership on April 9, 2009.

Knierim began skating with Carolyn-Ann Alba in 2009. They won the junior pairs title at the 2010 Midwestern Sectional Championships and the junior pewter medal at the 2010 U.S. Championships, after which they parted ways.

Knierim began a partnership with Andrea Poapst in July 2010. They won the junior title at the 2011 Midwestern Sectional Championships and the junior silver medal at the 2011 U.S. Championships. Poapst/Knierim won the gold medal at the 2011 Ice Challenge, their first senior international together. They parted ways at the end of the 2011–2012 season.

=== Teaming up with Alexa Scimeca and 2012–2013 season ===
Coach Dalilah Sappenfield suggested that Knierim skate with Alexa Scimeca. They teamed up in April 2012. They began training with Sappenfield, Larry Ibarra, and various other coaches at the Broadmoor World Arena in Colorado Springs, Colorado.

Scimeca/Knierim won the gold medal in their first ever international event, the 2012 Coupe Internationale de Nice in October. After a number of withdrawals by other teams, they received a Grand Prix assignment, the 2012 NHK Trophy in November, where they placed fourth.

The pair won the silver medal at the 2013 U.S. Championships in January. They were assigned to the 2013 Four Continents Championships but withdrew just before the event when Scimeca injured her right foot in practice. Scimeca/Knierim were named to the U.S. team for the 2013 World Championships after Caydee Denney / John Coughlin withdrew. They placed ninth in their World Championships debut in March.

=== 2013–2014 season ===
Scimeca/Knierim experienced a setback that hampered their season when Knierim broke his left fibula in July. He underwent surgery that placed a metal plate and nine screws in his ankle. While Knierim was able to heal relatively quickly, the team believed they rushed back to competition a bit too soon. In January, they won the pewter medal at the 2014 U.S. Championships and were named second alternates to the 2014 Winter Olympic team. They then won the bronze medal at the 2014 Four Continents Championships. Their second place short program score of 66.04 set a new record for the highest score ever achieved by a U.S. pair team. Knierim had additional surgery in March to remove the metal hardware in his leg, which had been causing discomfort.

=== 2014–2015 season: First national title ===
Scimeca/Knierim won the gold medal in their first ISU Challenger series event, the 2014 U.S. International Classic, and won the bronze medal at 2014 Nebelhorn Trophy. They were assigned two Grand Prix events, placing fourth at both 2014 Skate America and 2014 Trophée Éric Bompard.

At the 2015 U.S. Championships, Scimeca/Knierim captured their first national title, setting new U.S. record scores in both the short program and the free skate. They also became the first American pair team in history to perform a quadruple twist in competition.

At the 2015 Four Continents Championships, Scimeca/Knierim placed fifth and earned new ISU personal best scores of 124.44 in the free skate and 187.98 total, setting new records for the highest scores ever achieved by a U.S. pair team in an international event. At the 2015 World Championships, the pair placed 7th, the highest finish by a U.S. pair since 2011. They then competed at the 2015 World Team Trophy, finishing 4th in the short program and 3rd in the free skate, which ultimately was a key factor in Team USA winning the gold medal. Scimeca/Knierim earned new personal best scores of 127.87 in the free skate and 192.09 total, setting new records once again for the highest scores ever recorded by a U.S. pair team in international competition.

Scimeca/Knierim won SKATING magazine's 2015 Readers’ Choice Skaters of the Year Award, also known as the Michelle Kwan Trophy.

=== 2015–2016 season: First Grand Prix medals and silver at Four Continents ===
Scimeca/Knierim began their season at 2015 Nebelhorn Trophy where they won the silver medal behind reigning Olympic champions Tatiana Volosozhar / Maxim Trankov. The team then competed at 2015 Skate America where they won their first Grand Prix medal, a silver. They placed 1st in the short program with a new personal best score of 69.69, setting a new record for the highest score ever achieved by a U.S. pair team in international competition. The following week, they won the gold medal at 2015 Ice Challenge in Graz, Austria.

Scimeca/Knierim went on to win the bronze medal at 2015 NHK Trophy, which helped qualify them for the 2015–16 Grand Prix Final in Barcelona, where they placed seventh. They were the first U.S. pair since 2007 to qualify for the Grand Prix Final. The pair entered the 2016 U.S. Championships as the heavy favorite for the title, but won the silver medal.

At the 2016 Four Continents Championships, Scimeca/Knierim won the silver medal in their best competitive outing to date. They earned new personal best scores of 140.35 in the free skate and 207.96 total, which are the highest scores ever recorded by a U.S. pair team in international competition under that version of the judging system. A subsequent injury to Knierim limited the team's training before the 2016 World Championships, where they placed 9th. They were 7th in the short program with a personal best score of 71.37, which set a new record for the highest score ever achieved by a U.S. pair team in international competition. The pair then competed for Team North America at the inaugural 2016 Team Challenge Cup, where the team won the gold medal.

=== 2016–2017 season: Major illness, surgery, and successful return ===
Alexa Scimeca Knierim became sick in April 2016, and her illness interrupted the Knierims' training throughout the summer months. She was properly diagnosed with a rare, life-threatening gastrointestinal condition in August and underwent two abdominal surgeries that month. The pair resumed light training in late September. Alexa Knierim underwent additional surgery on November 1 and returned to training by the middle of that month.

Alexa Knierim's illness involved regular episodes of vomiting, debilitating pain, difficulties with sleeping, eating or drinking, as well as significant weight loss. Already small, she lost 20 pounds and shrunk to just over 80 pounds. Knierim stated that when his wife initially returned to the ice following surgery, she had to hold his hands just to skate a lap around the rink and could only skate for 10 minutes before having to go home for a nap because it was so physically draining on her body. The pair withdrew from both of their Grand Prix events, the 2016 Rostelecom Cup and 2016 Cup of China, and the 2017 U.S. Championships. They resumed full training in January and were named to the U.S. team for both the 2017 Four Continents Championships and the 2017 World Championships.

In February, the Knierims made a strong return to competition at the 2017 Four Continents Championships, where they placed sixth in a deep field of Chinese and Canadian pairs. Their total score was the second highest score ever achieved by a U.S. pair team, behind only their score from Four Continents the prior year. The pair then competed at the 2017 World Championships, where they skated two strong programs and placed 10th in an exceptionally deep field. 5th through 10th place were separated by just 4.35 points. They placed 8th in the short program with a personal best score of 72.17, the highest score ever achieved by a U.S. pair team under that version of the judging system. They were the only U.S. pair to qualify for the free skate.

Their total score of 202.37 was the second highest in U.S. pairs history, and they would remain the only U.S. pair to have ever surpassed the 200 point barrier under that version of the judging system. This was the Knierims' fourth top 10 finish in their four Worlds appearances. They were the only U.S. pair in the previous five years to have earned top 10 finishes at the World Championships.

=== 2017–2018 season: Second national title and Pyeongchang Olympics ===
The Knierims began their season at the 2017 U.S. International Classic, where they won the silver medal and were narrowly edged by Canadians Kirsten Moore-Towers and Michael Marinaro. They placed 1st in the free skate after having changed their long program in the week prior to the event. The team then competed at two Grand Prix events, 2017 NHK Trophy and 2017 Skate America, where they placed a solid fifth in deep fields at both events. It was revealed after Skate America that Chris Knierim was recovering from a patella injury. The Knierims had been the top U.S. finisher at every international event they had entered for the past three years. Their scores throughout the Grand Prix season were the clear highest by a U.S. pair team.

At the 2018 U.S. Championships, the Knierims won their second National title with a score of 206.60. They placed 1st in the short program, 1st in the free skate, and performed a quadruple twist in competition for the first time since 2016. They are one of the only pairs in the world capable of doing a quad twist. Following the event, the Knierims were named to the 2018 U.S. Olympic Team that competed at the 2018 Winter Olympics in Pyeongchang, South Korea. They were the sole U.S. pair team at this Olympic Games.

At the 2018 Winter Olympics, the Knierims won an Olympic bronze medal in the figure skating team event as a key part of the U.S. team. They placed a strong 4th in the short program with a season's best score, defeating top pairs from China, France, and Italy. They then placed 4th in the free skate. Their total combined score was the highest of their season. In the pair event, they were fourteenth in the short program and placed fifteenth overall in what was the strongest Olympic pair competition to date. In the free skate, the Knierims became the first U.S. pair, and the second pair ever in history, to successfully perform a quad twist at the Olympics.

Weeks later, the Knierims competed at the 2018 World Championships. They placed eleventh in the short program with a strong performance and were less than three points from the top 5. They finished fifteenth overall after an uncharacteristically shaky skate by Alexa that included a fall on a death spiral. They were the only U.S. pair to qualify for the free skate for the second consecutive year.

On May 14, 2018, U.S. Figure Skating announced that the Knierims had left their coach, Dalilah Sappenfield, to train with 2018 Olympic champion Aljona Savchenko and her coaching staff. They began training part-time in Oberstdorf, Germany.

=== 2018–2019 season: Third Grand Prix medal and coaching changes ===
The Knierims started their season at 2018 Nebelhorn Trophy where they won the silver medal. They placed 1st in the short program and finished 2nd overall, just one point from 1st. They then competed at their first Grand Prix event of the season, 2018 Skate America, where they placed 4th. They were without a coach at the event, and it was announced on October 20, 2018, in the middle of the free skate, that they had very recently split from their coach Aljona Savchenko, which the Knierims confirmed after the event.

In early November, the Knierims won the bronze medal at their second Grand Prix event, 2018 NHK Trophy, ahead of Canadians Kirsten Moore-Towers and Michael Marinaro. They were coached at the event by Todd Sand and had relocated to California during the two weeks between their Grand Prix events. They officially began training with Jenni Meno and Todd Sand in late November. In early December, they won the silver medal at 2018 Golden Spin of Zagreb, placing 1st in the free skate and finishing one point from 1st overall.

In January at the 2019 U.S. Championships, the Knierims placed a very unexpected seventh after a series of unusual mishaps. In the short program, they had an uncharacteristic big error on their signature triple twist, typically their best element. In the free skate, they surprisingly aborted their second lift and missed their third lift entirely. It was revealed after the competition that Chris Knierim had been suffering from a torn wrist ligament that requires surgery to repair. He remarked afterward that "the program went how our year went, a lot of unplanned mishaps." He underwent surgery to repair his wrist during the off-season.

=== 2019–2020 season: Third national title and retirement ===
The Knierims added Rafael Arutyunyan to their coaching team during the off-season. They had a strong start to their season at 2019 CS Nebelhorn Trophy where they won the silver medal with a total score of 202.41. Their free skate score of 131.58 was the highest score ever achieved by a U.S. pair team under the current version of the judging system.

The Knierims then competed at their first Grand Prix event of the season, Skate Canada, where they skated strongly and placed fourth, less than three points behind reigning World silver medalists Evgenia Tarasova and Vladimir Morozov. At their second Grand Prix event, 2019 NHK Trophy, they placed fifth in the short program with a fall and a completely invalidated death spiral. After a free skate with many errors, including a costly missed lift, they placed seventh overall.

In January at the 2020 U.S. Championships, the Knierims won their third national title with a score of 216.15, the highest score ever achieved in U.S. competition. They skated a completely clean short program and scored 77.06, a new record at the U.S. Championships, and won that segment by nearly seven points. After leaving some points on the table in an otherwise strong free skate performance, they placed second in that segment and first overall after having a nearly ten point lead over the silver medalists in the short program. The Knierims were the first U.S. pair team to win three national titles since 2002.

Less than two weeks after the U.S. Championships, the Knierims competed at the 2020 Four Continents Championships in Seoul. In the short program, they both erred on their side-by-side jump and then Chris slipped on the entry to their side-by-side spin, completely invalidating the element. They placed fifth in the segment. The Knierims withdrew the morning of the free skate, citing family illness.

The Knierims were on the official entry list for the 2020 World Championships that was released on February 26, but on that same day it was announced that Chris Knierim was retiring from the sport, citing injuries and ongoing bouts of depression that had come to a head at the Four Continents Championships. It was also announced that Alexa Knierim would be seeking a new partner to continue her skating career. She stated, "I'm his wife over being his partner. We know skating ends and life continues. For us, our marriage, our relationship is what's important." Chris Knierim added, "I look forward to watching her keep skating and will support her in every way I can. Alexa is very tenacious and strong. She's fire on the ice. Nothing can stop her."

On April 1, Alexa Knierim announced that she was forming a new partnership with Brandon Frazier. Chris Knierim began coaching at the rink at which his wife trains.

== Programs ==
=== With Scimeca Knierim ===
Season	Short program	Free skating	Exhibition
2019–2020	At Last by Beyonce Knowles choreo. by Benoit Richaud	Drop of Fragrance by Maxime Rodriguez; Experience by Ludovico Einaudi choreo. by Benoit Richaud	American Woman by Lenny Kravitz
2018–2019	Castle by Halsey	Wicked Game by James Vincent McMorrow	Goodbye My Lover by James Blunt
2017–2018	Come What May (from Moulin Rouge!) by Nicole Kidman & Ewan McGregor; Paint It Black by The Rolling Stones performed by Ciara and the London Symphony Orchestra	Ghost the Musical (including Unchained Melody) by Bruce Joel Rubin, Dave Stewart, and Glen Ballard; Charlie Chaplin Medley	Rush Medley; Nothing Else Matters by Metallica
2016–2017	Come What May (from Moulin Rouge!) by Nicole Kidman & Ewan McGregor	Ghost the Musical (including Unchained Melody) by Bruce Joel Rubin, Dave Stewart, and Glen Ballard	
2015–2016	Nothing Else Matters by Metallica choreo. by Julie Marcotte	Elizabeth: The Golden Age by Craig Armstrong and A. R. Rahman choreo. by Julie Marcotte	Rise Up by Andra Day; The Flower Duet by Léo Delibes performed by Florentine Opera
2014–2015	El Tango de Roxanne (from Moulin Rouge!) choreo. by Julie Marcotte	An American in Paris by George Gershwin, orchestra conducted by Leonard Bernstein choreo. by Julie Marcotte	Girls Just Want to Have Fun by Cyndi Lauper; Macho Man by Village People; You Are So Beautiful by Joe Cocker
2013–2014	Papa, Can You Hear Me? (from Yentl) by Michel Legrand choreo. by Catarina Lindgren	Ever After by George Fenton choreo. by Igor Shpilband	Hopelessly Devoted to You; You're the One That I Want; Summer Nights (from Grease)
2012–2013	Moonlight Sonata by Ludwig van Beethoven	Life Is Beautiful by Nicola Piovani; Last of the Mohicans by Randy Edelman; 500 Nations by Peter Buffett	Just a Kiss by Lady Antebellum

=== With Poapst ===
Season	Short program	Free skating
2011–2012	Once Upon a December (from Anastasia) by David Newman	Swan Lake by Pyotr Ilyich Tchaikovsky Orchestra of the Marinsky Theatre
2010–2011	Papa, Can You Hear Me? by Michel Legrand	Amélie by Yann Tiersen

=== With Carman ===
Season	Short program	Free skating
2008–2009	Csárdás by Monti, Leahy	City Slickers by Marc Shaiman
2006–2007	Nightmare by Brain Bug	City Slickers by Marc Shaiman

== Competitive highlights ==
=== Pair skating with Alexa Scimeca Knierim ===
- GP – Event of the ISU Grand Prix Series
- JGP – Event of the ISU Junior Grand Prix Series
- CS – Event of the ISU Challenger Series
- WD – Withdrew from competition
- Medals at team events are awarded for the team results only. Individual placements at team events are listed in parentheses.

Competition placements at senior level
Season	2012–13	2013–14	2014–15	2015–16	2016–17	2017–18	2018–19	2019–20
Winter Olympics						15th		
Winter Olympics (Team event)						3rd		
World Championships	9th		7th	9th	10th	15th		
Four Continents Championships	WD	3rd	5th	2nd	6th			WD
Grand Prix Final				7th				
U.S. Championships	2nd	4th	1st	2nd		1st	7th	1st
World Team Trophy			1st (4th)					
GP Cup of China		5th						
GP France			4th					
GP NHK Trophy	4th			3rd		5th	3rd	7th
GP Rostelecom Cup		6th						
GP Skate America			4th	2nd		5th	4th	
GP Skate Canada								4th
CS Golden Spin of Zagreb							2nd	
CS Ice Challenge				1st				
CS Nebelhorn Trophy			3rd	2nd			2nd	2nd
CS U.S. Classic			1st			2nd		
Cup of Nice	1st							
Ondrej Nepela Trophy		3rd						
Team Challenge Cup				1st (3rd)				

=== Pair skating with Andrea Poapst ===
Competition placements at junior level
Season	2010–11
U.S. Championships	2nd

Competition placements at senior level
Season	2011–12
U.S. Championships	7th
Ice Challenge	1st

=== Pair skating with Carolyn-Ann Alba ===
Competition placements at junior level
Season	2009–10
U.S. Championships	4th

=== Pair skating with Brynn Carman ===
Competition placements at junior level
Season	2008–09
World Junior Championships	9th
U.S. Championships	2nd
JGP Belarus	5th
JGP Mexico	9th

== Detailed results ==
=== Pair skating with Alexa Scimeca Knierim ===
ISU personal best scores in the +5/-5 GOE System
Segment	Type	Score	Event
Total	TSS	202.41	2019 CS Nebelhorn Trophy
Short program	TSS	71.28	2019 Skate Canada International
Short program	TES	39.99	2019 CS Nebelhorn Trophy
Short program	PCS	32.77	2019 Skate Canada International
Free skating	TSS	131.58	2019 CS Nebelhorn Trophy
Free skating	TES	66.06	2019 CS Nebelhorn Trophy
Free skating	PCS	65.52	2019 CS Nebelhorn Trophy

ISU personal best scores in the +3/-3 GOE System
Segment	Type	Score	Event
Total	TSS	207.96	2016 Four Continents Championships
Short program	TSS	72.17	2017 World Championships
Short program	TES	40.74	2017 World Championships
Short program	PCS	32.80	2016 World Championships
Free skating	TSS	140.35	2016 Four Continents Championships
Free skating	TES	73.90	2016 Four Continents Championships
Free skating	PCS	66.45	2016 Four Continents Championships

- Small medals for the short program and free skating are only awarded at ISU Championships.
- At national events in the United States, pewter medals are awarded for fourth place.
- Medals at team events are awarded for the team results only. Individual placements at team events are listed in parentheses.

Results in the 2012–13 season
Date	Event	SP		FS		Total	
Date	Event	P	Score	P	Score	P	Score
Oct 24–28, 2012	(France) 2012 Coupe Internationale de Nice	1	59.01	2	96.99	1	156.00
Nov 22–25, 2012	(Japan) 2012 NHK Trophy	5	54.41	4	108.69	4	163.10
Jan 20–27, 2013	(United States) 2013 U.S. Championships	3	52.79	1	119.96	2	172.75
Mar 11–17, 2013	(Canada) 2013 World Championships	12	55.73	9	117.78	9	173.51

Results in the 2013–14 season
Date	Event	SP		FS		Total	
Date	Event	P	Score	P	Score	P	Score
Oct 2–5, 2013	(Slovakia) 2013 Ondrej Nepela Trophy	2	51.17	3	102.17	3	153.34
Nov 1–3, 2013	2013 Cup of China	4	57.99	6	103.73	5	161.71
Nov 22–24, 2-13	(Russia) 2013 Rostelecom Cup	5	59.56	6	103.73	6	173.70
Jan 5–12, 2014	(United States) 2014 U.S. Championships	5	64.68	4	124.99	4	189.67
Jan 20–25, 2014	(Taiwan) 2014 Four Continents Championships	2	66.04	4	104.31	3	170.35

Results in the 2014–15 season
Date	Event	SP		FS		Total	
Date	Event	P	Score	P	Score	P	Score
Sep 11–14, 2014	(United States) 2014 CS U.S. International Classic	2	49.00	1	114.24	1	163.24
Sep 25–27, 2014	(Germany) 2014 CS Nebelhorn Trophy	3	55.29	3	110.81	3	166.10
Oct 23–26, 2014	(United States) 2014 Skate America	4	60.61	4	108.01	4	168.62
Nov 20–23, 2014	(France) 2014 Trophée Éric Bompard	4	59.04	3	120.28	4	179.32
Jan 17–25, 2015	(United States) 2015 U.S. Championships	1	74.01	1	136.48	1	210.49
Feb 10–15, 2015	(South Korea) 2015 Four Continents Championships	5	63.54	5	124.44	5	187.98
Mar 23–29, 2015	(China) 2015 World Championships	7	65.56	7	120.25	7	185.81
Mar 23–29, 2015	(Japan) 2015 World Team Trophy	4	64.22	3	127.87	1 (4)	192.09

Results in the 2015–16 season
Date	Event	SP		FS		Total	
Date	Event	P	Score	P	Score	P	Score
Sep 23–26, 2015	(Germany) 2015 CS Nebelhorn Trophy	4	58.00	2	121.56	2	179.56
Oct 22–25, 2015	(United States) 2015 Skate America	1	69.69	4	122.28	2	191.97
Oct 27–31, 2015	(Austria) 2015 CS Ice Challenge	1	68.74	1	120.54	1	189.28
Nov 26–29, 2015	(Japan) 2015 NHK Trophy	2	68.43	3	122.23	3	190.66
Dec 10–13, 2015	(Spain) 2015–16 Grand Prix Final	6	68.14	7	109.28	7	177.42
Jan 15–24, 2016	(United States) 2016 U.S. Championships	2	67.35	2	129.45	2	196.80
Feb 16–21, 2016	(Taiwan) 2016 Four Continents Championships	3	67.61	2	140.35	2	207.96
Mar 28 – Apr 3, 2016	(United States) 2016 World Championships	7	71.37	12	118.69	9	190.06
Apr 22–24, 2016	(United States) 2016 Team Challenge Cup	–	–	3	122.15	1 (3)	–

Results in the 2016–17 season
Date	Event	SP		FS		Total	
Date	Event	P	Score	P	Score	P	Score
Feb 14–19, 2017	(South Korea) 2017 Four Continents Championships	6	69.10	6	124.81	6	193.91
Mar 29 – Apr 2, 2017	(Finland) 2017 World Championships	8	72.17	11	130.20	10	202.37

Results in the 2017–18 season
Date	Event	SP		FS		Total	
Date	Event	P	Score	P	Score	P	Score
Sep 14–16, 2017	(United States) 2017 CS U.S. International Classic	3	61.32	1	124.76	2	186.08
Nov 10–12, 2017	(Japan) 2017 NHK Trophy	4	65.86	5	126.65	5	192.51
Nov 24–26, 2017	(United States) 2017 Skate America	5	64.27	6	124.80	5	192.51
Jan 3–7, 2018	(United States) 2018 U.S. Championships	1	71.10	1	135.50	1	206.60
Feb 9–12, 2018	(South Korea) 2018 Winter Olympics (Team event)	4	69.75	4	126.56	3	196.31
Feb 14–25, 2018	(South Korea) 2018 Winter Olympics	14	65.55	15	120.27	15	185.82
Mar 19–25, 2018	(Italy) 2018 World Championships	11	69.55	15	112.49	15	182.04

Results in the 2018–19 season
Date	Event	SP		FS		Total	
Date	Event	P	Score	P	Score	P	Score
Sep 26–29, 2018	(Germany) 2018 CS Nebelhorn Trophy	1	61.73	3	115.49	2	177.22
Oct 19–21, 2018	(United States) 2018 Skate America	5	57.31	4	114.25	4	171.56
Nov 9–11, 2018	(Japan) 2018 NHK Trophy	4	64.75	3	125.74	3	190.49
Dec 5–8, 2018	(Croatia) 2018 CS Golden Spin of Zagreb	3	64.04	1	118.80	2	182.84
Jan 19–27, 2019	(United States) 2019 U.S. Championships	7	61.56	7	109.86	7	171.42

Results in the 2019–20 season
Date	Event	SP		FS		Total	
Date	Event	P	Score	P	Score	P	Score
Sep 25–28, 2019	(Germany) 2019 CS Nebelhorn Trophy	2	70.83	2	131.58	2	202.41
Oct 25–27, 2019	2019 Skate Canada International	4	71.28	4	128.29	4	199.57
Nov 22–24, 2019	(Japan) 2019 NHK Trophy	5	63.63	8	109.70	7	173.33
Jan 18–27, 2020	(United States) 2020 U.S. Championships	1	77.06	2	139.09	1	216.15
Feb 4–9, 2020	(South Korea) 2020 Four Continents Championships	5	63.14	–	–	–	WD
