= Nicole Orford =

Canadian ice dancer (born 1992)

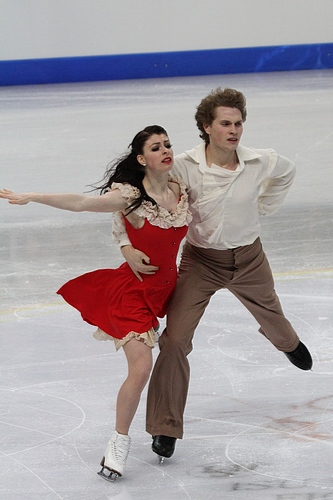
- Orford and Williams in 2012

Personal information
- Born: October 10, 1992 (age 34) Calgary, Alberta, Canada
- Height: 1.60 m (5 ft 3 in)

Figure skating career
- Country: Canada
- Partner: Asher Hill
- Coach: Carol Lane, Jon Lane, Juris Razgulajevs
- Skating club: Inlet SC, Port Coquitlam
- Began skating: 1995

Nicole Orford (born October 10, 1992) is a Canadian former ice dancer. With former partner Thomas Williams, she placed fifth at the 2014 Four Continents Championships. She teamed up with Asher Hill in 2015.

== Personal life ==
Nicole Orford was born in Calgary, Alberta. She is majoring in health sciences at Simon Fraser University.

== Career ==
Orford began skating at age three and took up ice dancing in 2008. She formed a partnership with Malcolm Rohon O'Halloran in May 2008. They split after the 2010 Canadian Championships.

=== Partnership with Thomas Williams ===
Orford began training with Thomas Williams in May 2010. Competing on the 2010–11 ISU Junior Grand Prix series, they took the bronze medal in England and placed fifth in the Czech Republic. Junior national champions, they were sent to the 2011 World Junior Championships and finished eighth.

During the 2011–12 ISU Junior Grand Prix, Orford/Williams won gold in Brisbane, Australia, and finished sixth in Austria. Due to Skate Canada rules, they competed on the senior level at the 2012 Canadian Championships and came in sixth. They also placed sixth at the 2012 World Junior Championships.

Orford/Williams made their senior international debut in the 2012–13 season. Competing on the Grand Prix series for the first time, they placed eighth at the 2012 Rostelecom Cup and fourth at the 2012 NHK Trophy. After winning the bronze medal at the 2013 Canadian Championships, they were assigned to the 2013 Four Continents Championships and finished sixth.

In the summer of 2013, Williams injured both ankles due to boot problems, causing the team to reduce their training to 20 minutes at a time. They won bronze at the U.S. Classic and placed eighth at the 2013 Trophée Éric Bompard. Fifth at the 2014 Canadian Championships, Orford/Williams were not named in Canada's Olympic team but were sent to the 2014 Four Continents Championships, where they placed fifth.

=== Partnership with Asher Hill ===
Orford teamed up with Asher Hill following a tryout held in April 2015.

== Programs ==
=== With Hill ===
Season	Short dance	Free dance
2015–16	Jazz music featuring Etta James and Johnny Mathis choreo. by Carol Lane, Juris Razgulajevs	The Theory of Everything by Jóhann Jóhannsson choreo. by Megan Wing, Aaron Lowe

=== With Williams ===
Season	Short dance	Free dance
2014–15	España cañí by Pascual Marquina Narro; Noche Flamenca (Bulerias)	Titanic by James Horner; Titanic Suite; Jack Dawson's Luck; The Portrait
2013–14	Quickstep: Cheek to Cheek by Frank Sinatra; Foxtrot: "Fly Me to the Moon" by Bart Howard	Love Never Dies by Andrew Lloyd Webber; Prologue; Beneath The Moonless Sky; Coney Island Waltz; Heaven By The Sea; Til I Hear You Sing
2012–13	Polka: Sold by John Michael Montgomery; Waltz: Tennessee Waltz by Anne Murray; Polka: Sold by John Michael Montgomery	High Society Overture; Now You Have Jazz by Bing Crosby, Louis Armstrong; High Society Overture
2011–12	Senior-level: Mariposa en Havana; Baila Baila Conmigo; Junior-level: Dance With Me by Debelah Morgan; Baila Baila Conmigo by Domino	Gone with the Wind by Max Steiner; Tara's Theme; War is Declared/The Death of Charles
2010–11	Waltz: Norwegian Wood (This Bird Has Flown); Quickstep: Help! by The Beatles	How You Remind Me; This Love; Dare You To Move by Vitamin String Quartet

=== With Rohon ===
Season	Original dance	Free dance
2009–10	Romanian gypsy dance	Mask of Zorro by James Horner

== Competitive highlights ==
GP: Grand Prix; JGP: Junior Grand Prix

=== With Hill ===
International
Event	15–16
Autumn Classic	1st
National
Canadian Championships	5th
Skate Canada Challenge	5th

=== With Williams ===
International
Event	10–11	11–12	12–13	13–14	14–15
Four Continents			6th	5th	
GP Bompard				8th	
GP NHK Trophy			4th		
GP Rostelecom Cup			8th		
GP Skate America					8th
CS Autumn Classic					6th
CS U.S. Classic					2nd
U.S. Classic				3rd	
International: Junior
Junior Worlds	8th	6th			
JGP Australia		1st			
JGP Austria		6th			
JGP Czech Republic	5th				
JGP U.K.	3rd				
National
Canadian Champ.	1st J	6th	3rd	5th	4th

=== With Rohon O'Halloran ===
International
Event	09–10
JGP Belarus	9th
National
Canadian Championships	7th J
