= Lee Dong-won =

Lee Dong-won may refer to:

- Lee Dong-won (figure skater) (born 1996), South Korean figure skater
- Lee Dong-won (footballer) (born 1983), South Korean footballer
- Lee Dong-won (judge) (born 1963), justice of the Supreme Court of Korea, 2018–present
