= Kim Tae-kyung =

South Korean figure skater

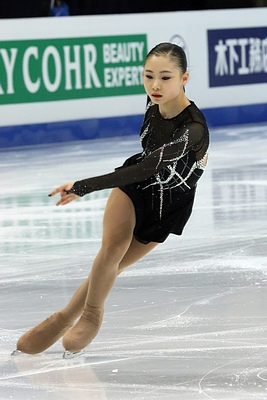

Personal information
- Born: March 29, 1998 (age 28) Seoul, Korea
- Height: 1.60 m (5 ft 3 in)

Figure skating career
- Country: South Korea
- Coach: Ryu Jong-hyeon
- Began skating: 2008

- Kim Tae-kyung
- Hangul: 김태경
- RR: Gim Taegyeong
- MR: Kim T'aegyŏng

Kim Tae-kyung (Korean: 김태경; born March 29, 1998) is a South Korean figure skater. She was selected to compete at the 2014 Four Continents Championships in Taipei. She placed 18th in the short program, 15th in the free skate, and 16th overall.

== Programs ==
Season	Short program	Free skating
2013–2014	The Matrix Revolutions by Don Davis	Ararat by Mychael Danna
2014–2015	Carmina Burana by Carl Orff	Love Story by Francis Lai

== Competitive highlights ==
International
Event	10–11	11–12	12–13	13–14	14–15	15–16	16–17
Four Continents				16th			
CS Volvo Cup					WD		
Asian Trophy			8th				
Crystal Skate						1st	
Cup of Nice				19th			
Taipei Open				2nd J			
National
South Korean	3rd N	8th J	9th J	13th		WD	26th
Levels: J = Junior; N = Novice; WD = Withdrew
