= Zhang Kexin =

Chinese figure skater

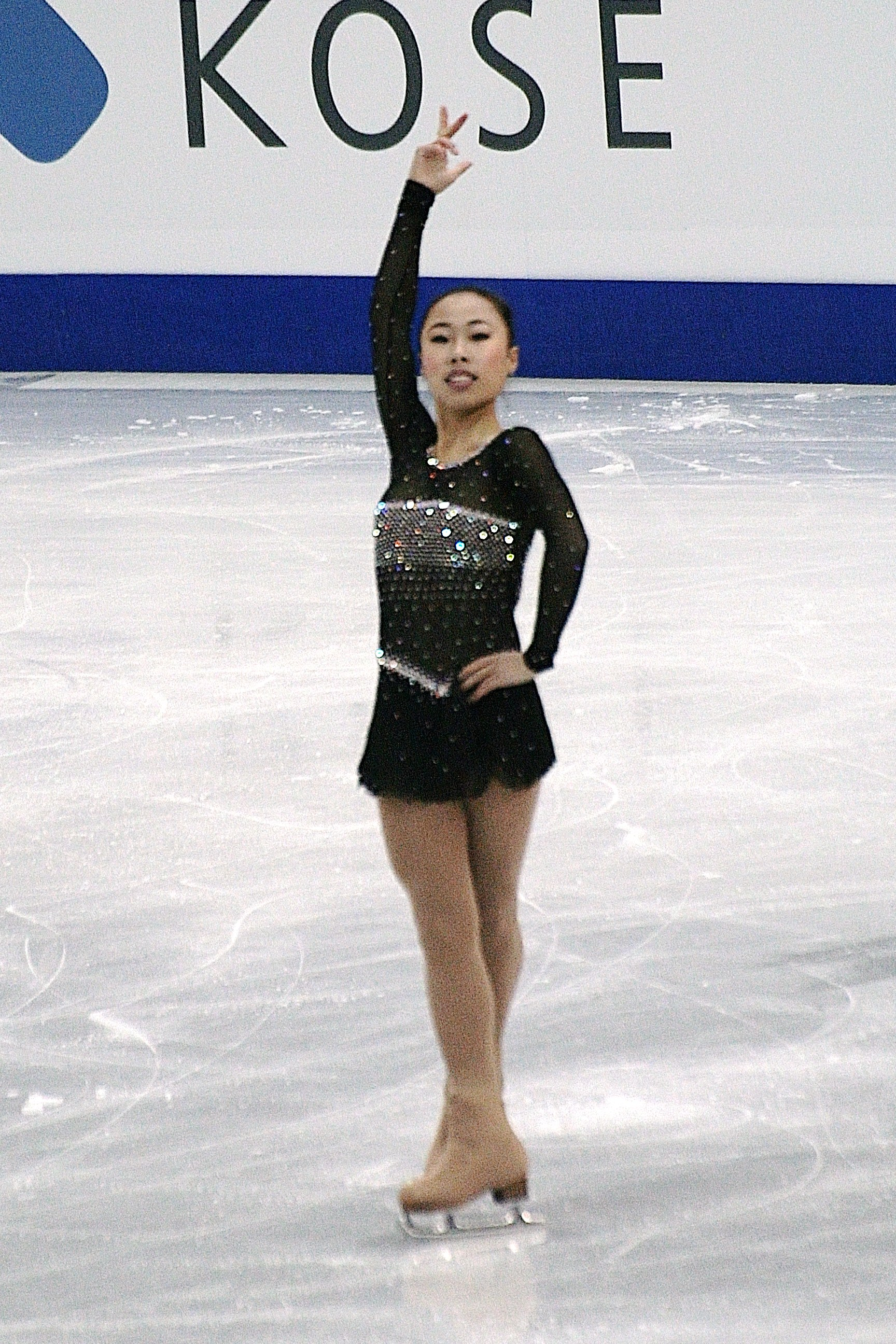

Personal information
- Full name: Zhang Kexin
- Born: October 17, 1995 (age 31) Harbin, China
- Height: 1.58 m (5 ft 2 in)

Figure skating career
- Country: China
- Retired: November 3, 2014
Medal record
Representing China
Figure skating: Ladies' singles
Asian Figure Skating Trophy
Silver medal – second place	2013 Bangkok	Ladies' singles

Zhang Kexin (simplified Chinese: 张可欣; traditional Chinese: 張可欣; pinyin: Zhāng Kěxīn; born October 17, 1995) is a Chinese former figure skater. She is the 2014 Chinese national champion.

== Career ==
Zhang began skating in 2000. Li Mingzhu became her coach in 2008.

Zhang debuted on the ISU Junior Grand Prix (JGP) series in 2009. She won the bronze medal at the 2010 JGP in Japan].

Making her Grand Prix debut, Zhang placed fourth at the 2011 Cup of China. She finished 7th at the 2012 World Championships in Nice, France, giving China two ladies' singles berths for the 2013 event, for the first time since 1997.

In the 2013–14 season, Zhang won silver at the Asian Open Trophy in Bangkok and placed 8th at the Cup of China Grand Prix event in Beijing. She won her first senior national title at the Chinese Championships in Changchun, having finished ahead of Zhao Ziquan. She was chosen to represent China at the 2014 Winter Olympics. Zhang finished 15th in Sochi, Russia, after placing 14th in the short program and 15th in the free skate.

== Programs ==
Season	Short program	Free skating	Exhibition
2014–2015	Tongqing Mogui	Por una cabeza by Carlos Gardel; La cumparsita by Gerardo Matos Rodríguez; Hable Con Ella by Alberto Iglesias; A Los Amigos by A. Pontier	
2013–2014	Paint It Black; Sympathy for the Devil by The Rolling Stones	Por una cabeza by Carlos Gardel; La cumparsita by Gerardo Matos Rodríguez; Hable Con Ella by Alberto Iglesias; A Los Amigos by A. Pontier	Fallin' by Alicia Keys
2012–2013	Nocturne by Frédéric Chopin	Valley of the Wind by Joe Hisaishi	
2011–2012	Piano Concerto No. 3 by Sergei Rachmaninoff choreo. by Jiang Hailan	En la cueva (from El amor brujo) by Manuel de Falla choreo. by David Wilson	Amazing Grace
2010–2011	India by Michael Brooks	Tristan and Iseult by Maxime Rodriguez	
2009–2010	Carmen by Georges Bizet		
2008–2009	Carmen by Georges Bizet	Yellow River Piano Concerto by Xian Xinghai	Anytime, Anywhere by Sarah Brightman
2007–2008			May It Be by Enya

== Competitive highlights ==
GP: Grand Prix; JGP: Junior Grand Prix

International
Event	08–09	09–10	10–11	11–12	12–13	13–14
Olympics						15th
Worlds				7th	23rd	
Four Continents				5th	10th	11th
GP Bompard					WD	
GP Cup of China				4th	WD	8th
Asian Games			4th			
Asian Trophy						2nd
International: Junior
JGP Belarus		7th				
JGP Germany		17th	11th			
JGP Japan			3rd			
National
Chinese Champ.		5th		3rd		1st
Chinese NG	6th			2nd		
Team events
Olympics						7th T 7th P
World Team; Trophy					5th T 9th P	
WD: Withdrew; T: Team result; P: Personal result. Medals awarded for team result only.

== Detailed results ==
2011–12 season
Date	Event	QR	SP	FS	Total
March 26–31, 2012	2012 World Championships	–	9; 55.00	7; 102.57	7; 157.57
February 7–12, 2012	2012 Four Continents Championships	–	5; 54.07	4; 108.52	5; 162.59
January 4–6, 2012	12th Chinese National Winter Games	–	2; 55.90	2; 105.93	2; 161.83
November 4–6, 2011	2011 Cup of China	–	5; 52.85	5; 100.47	4; 153.32
September 20–23, 2011	2012 Chinese Championships	3; 55.17	1; 54.56	4; 81.45	3; 191.18

2010–11 season
Date	Event	Level	SP	FS	Total
February 4–5, 2011	2011 Asian Winter Games	Senior	4; 47.74	4; 94.28	4; 142.02
October 6–10, 2010	2010 Junior Grand Prix, Germany	Junior	15; 37.84	8; 77.23	11; 115.07
September 22–26, 2010	2010 Junior Grand Prix, Japan	Junior	4; 46.93	3; 87.15	3; 134.08
2009–10 season
Date	Event	Level	SP	FS	Total
Sept. 30 – Oct. 4, 2009	2009 Junior Grand Prix, Germany	Junior	12; 37.44	21; 58.79	17; 96.23
September 23–26, 2009	2009 Junior Grand Prix, Belarus	Junior	5; 45.34	10; 66.62	7; 111.96
September 3–5, 2009	2010 Chinese Championships	Senior	5 ?	4 ?	5; 114.98

- QR = Qualifying round; SP = Short program; FS = Free skating
