= 2012 NHK Trophy =

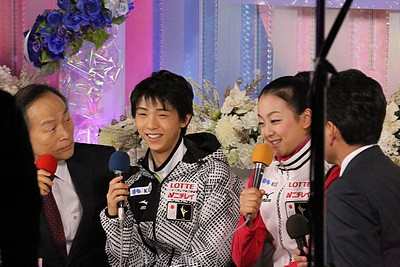
- Figure Skating Competition, Hanyu and Asada in Yutaka's room at the 2012 NHK Trophy.
- Type: Grand Prix
- Date: November 22 – 25
- Season: 2012–13
- Location: Miyagi
- Host: Japan Skating Federation
- Venue: Sekisui Heim Super Arena

Champions
- Men's singles: (Japan) Yuzuru Hanyu
- Ladies' singles: (Japan) Mao Asada
- Pairs: (Russia) Vera Bazarova / Yuri Larionov
- Ice dance: (United States) Meryl Davis / Charlie White
- Previous: 2011 NHK Trophy
- Next: 2013 NHK Trophy
- Previous Grand Prix: 2012 Trophée Éric Bompard
- Next Grand Prix: 2012–13 Grand Prix Final

The 2012 NHK Trophy was the final event of six in the 2012–13 ISU Grand Prix of Figure Skating, a senior-level international invitational competition series. It was held at the Sekisui Heim Super Arena in Miyagi on November 22–25. Medals were awarded in the disciplines of men's singles, ladies' singles, pair skating, and ice dancing. Skaters earned points toward qualifying for the 2012–13 Grand Prix Final.

== Eligibility ==
Skaters who reached the age of 14 by July 1, 2012 were eligible to compete on the senior Grand Prix circuit.

Prior to competing in a Grand Prix event, skaters were required to have earned the following scores (3/5 of the top scores at the 2012 World Championships):

Discipline	Minimum
Men	159.66
Ladies	113.43
Pairs	120.90
Ice dancing	109.59

== Entries ==
The entries were as follows.

Country	Men	Ladies	Pairs	Ice dancing
Canada	Kevin Reynolds; Andrei Rogozine		Kirsten Moore-Towers / Dylan Moscovitch	Nicole Orford / Thomas Williams
China		Li Zijun		Huang Xintong / Zheng Xun; Yu Xiaoyang / Wang Chen
Spain	Javier Fernández			
United Kingdom				Penny Coomes / Nicholas Buckland
Georgia		Elene Gedevanishvili		
Italy			Nicole Della Monica / Matteo Guarise	
Japan	Yuzuru Hanyu; Daisuke Murakami; Daisuke Takahashi	Mao Asada; Haruka Imai; Akiko Suzuki		Cathy Reed / Chris Reed
Russia	Sergei Voronov	Sofia Biryukova; Ksenia Makarova	Vera Bazarova / Yuri Larionov; Anastasia Martiusheva / Alexei Rogonov	Elena Ilinykh / Nikita Katsalapov
United States	Richard Dornbush; Ross Miner; Adam Rippon	Mirai Nagasu; Agnes Zawadzki	Marissa Castelli / Simon Shnapir; Lindsay Davis / Mark Ladwig; Alexa Scimeca / Chris Knierim	Meryl Davis / Charlie White; Maia Shibutani / Alex Shibutani

Withdrawals included Mary Beth Marley / Rockne Brubaker of the United States, due to the end of their partnership, Japan's Narumi Takahashi / Mervin Tran in order to undergo surgery on Takahashi's repeatedly dislocating shoulder, China's Sui Wenjing / Han Cong due to an injury to Sui, Russia's Polina Shelepen due to worsening of a long-standing ankle injury (she was replaced by the United States' Mirai Nagasu), the United States' Alissa Czisny to continue her recovery from surgery, Caitlin Yankowskas / Joshua Reagan due to Reagan's rib injury, and Germany's Mari Vartmann / Aaron Van Cleave due to Van Cleave's broken cheekbone.

== Overview ==
The competition took place in Miyagi, one of the regions severely affected by the 2011 Tōhoku earthquake and tsunami, with the arena used as a temporary morgue. The Japan Skating Federation said it selected the location to "send a message about our recovery, in response to support from around the world." Moderate tremors occurred during the weekend of the event but did not affect the competition.

Skating in his hometown, Japan's Yuzuru Hanyu won the men's short program with a world record score of 95.32 points – slightly surpassing the record he set at the 2012 Skate America (95.07) – while his teammate Daisuke Takahashi and Spain's Javier Fernández rounded out the top three. Daisuke Murakami attempted to continue after partially dislocating his right shoulder in a fall but eventually withdrew. In the free skating, Hanyu maintained his lead and won the second GP gold medal of his career, Takahashi took silver, and the United States' Ross Miner rose from fourth after the short to take the bronze.

Japan's Mao Asada won the ladies' short program ahead of the United States' Mirai Nagasu and China's Li Zijun. Akiko Suzuki of Japan won the free skating by over nine points and finished with the silver medal, Asada was second in the segment but finished first overall by 0.05 points, and Nagasu took the bronze.

Meryl Davis / Charlie White of the United States placed first in the short dance, followed by their teammates Maia Shibutani / Alex Shibutani and Russia's Elena Ilinykh / Nikita Katsalapov. Ilinykh fell ill with food poisoning before the free dance. Davis / White also placed first in the free dance and won the gold medal, Ilinykh / Katsalapov the silver, and the Shibutanis the bronze.

Russia's Vera Bazarova / Yuri Larionov won the pairs' short program, slightly ahead of Canada's Kirsten Moore-Towers / Dylan Moscovitch, with the United States' Marissa Castelli / Simon Shnapir in third. The top three remained the same after the free skating and Bazarova / Larionov won their first gold medal on the Grand Prix series.

== Results ==
=== Men ===
Rank	Name	Nation	Total points	SP		FS	
1	Yuzuru Hanyu	Japan	261.03	1	95.32	1	165.71
2	Daisuke Takahashi	Japan	251.51	2	87.47	2	164.04
3	Ross Miner	United States	235.37	4	73.41	3	161.96
4	Javier Fernández	Spain	232.78	3	86.23	5	146.55
5	Richard Dornbush	United States	217.56	6	70.05	4	147.51
6	Kevin Reynolds	Canada	216.26	5	70.20	6	146.06
7	Sergei Voronov	Russia	214.88	7	70.03	7	144.85
8	Adam Rippon	United States	210.47	8	67.89	8	142.58
9	Andrei Rogozine	Canada	182.39	9	67.70	9	114.69
WD	Daisuke Murakami	Japan					

=== Ladies ===
Rank	Name	Nation	Total points	SP		FS	
1	Mao Asada	Japan	185.27	1	67.95	2	117.32
2	Akiko Suzuki	Japan	185.22	5	58.60	1	126.62
3	Mirai Nagasu	United States	176.68	2	61.18	3	115.50
4	Li Zijun	China	174.11	3	59.62	4	114.49
5	Agnes Zawadzki	United States	160.37	7	55.02	5	105.35
6	Elene Gedevanishvili	Georgia	156.96	6	57.50	6	99.46
7	Ksenia Makarova	Russia	156.52	4	58.93	7	97.59
8	Haruka Imai	Japan	145.42	9	48.10	8	97.32
9	Sofia Biryukova	Russia	139.12	8	49.31	9	89.81

=== Pairs ===
Rank	Name	Nation	Total points	SP		FS	
1	Vera Bazarova / Yuri Larionov	Russia	192.02	1	65.61	1	126.41
2	Kirsten Moore-Towers / Dylan Moscovitch	Canada	180.63	2	65.14	2	115.49
3	Marissa Castelli / Simon Shnapir	United States	174.51	3	61.85	3	112.66
4	Alexa Scimeca / Chris Knierim	United States	163.10	5	54.41	4	108.69
5	Anastasia Martiusheva / Alexei Rogonov	Russia	162.25	4	57.07	5	105.18
6	Lindsay Davis / Mark Ladwig	United States	143.70	6	45.61	6	98.09
7	Nicole Della Monica / Matteo Guarise	Italy	121.53	7	42.14	7	79.39

=== Ice dancing ===
Rank	Name	Nation	Total points	SD		FD	
1	Meryl Davis / Charlie White	United States	178.48	1	69.86	1	108.62
2	Elena Ilinykh / Nikita Katsalapov	Russia	156.62	3	59.96	2	96.66
3	Maia Shibutani / Alex Shibutani	United States	154.56	2	60.84	3	93.72
4	Nicole Orford / Thomas Williams	Canada	130.10	4	49.76	4	80.34
5	Cathy Reed / Chris Reed	Japan	124.46	5	48.33	5	76.13
6	Penny Coomes / Nicholas Buckland	United Kingdom	122.80	6	46.72	6	76.08
7	Huang Xintong / Zheng Xun	China	119.56	7	45.99	7	73.57
8	Yu Xiaoyang / Wang Chen	China	108.28	8	40.92	8	67.36
