= Thomas Williams (figure skater) =

Canadian ice dancer (born 1991)

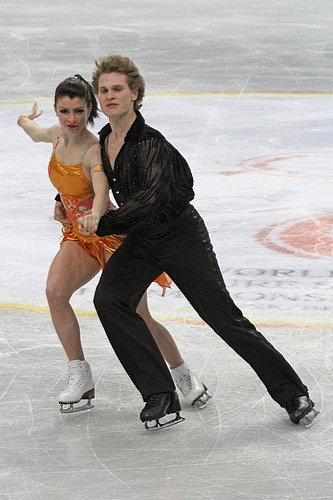
- Orford and Williams in 2012

Personal information
- Born: April 20, 1991 (age 35) Calgary, Alberta, Canada
- Height: 1.88 m (6 ft 2 in)

Figure skating career
- Country: Canada
- Partner: Sarah Arnold
- Coach: Megan Wing, Aaron Lowe
- Skating club: Calalta FSC Calgary
- Began skating: 1995

Thomas Williams (born April 20, 1991) is a Canadian former ice dancer. He competed at three Four Continents Championships with his skating partners, Nicole Orford and Sarah Arnold.

== Personal life ==
Thomas Williams was born on April 20, 1991, in Calgary, Alberta. He is the nephew of Canadian speed skater Michelle Morton. He has a car detailing business and has also worked for a financial services company.

== Skating career ==
=== Early years ===
Williams began learning to skate in 1995. He skated with Alicia Williams in the 2007–2008 season. During the following two seasons, he competed with Olga Lioudvinevitch, placing ninth on the junior level at the 2010 Canadian Championships.

=== Partnership with Orford ===
Williams began training with Nicole Orford in May 2010. Competing on the 2010–11 ISU Junior Grand Prix series, they took the bronze medal in England and placed fifth in the Czech Republic. After becoming junior national champions, they were sent to the 2011 World Junior Championships and finished eighth.

During the 2011–12 ISU Junior Grand Prix, Orford/Williams won gold in Brisbane, Australia, and finished sixth in Austria. Due to Skate Canada rules, they competed on the senior level at the 2012 Canadian Championships and came in sixth. They also placed sixth at the 2012 World Junior Championships.

Orford/Williams made their senior international debut in the 2012–13 season. Competing on the Grand Prix series for the first time, they placed eighth at the 2012 Rostelecom Cup and fourth at the 2012 NHK Trophy. After winning the bronze medal at the 2013 Canadian Championships, they were assigned to the 2013 Four Continents Championships and finished sixth.

In the summer of 2013, Williams injured both ankles due to boot problems, causing the team to reduce their training to 20 minutes at a time. They won bronze at the U.S. Classic and placed eighth at the 2013 Trophée Éric Bompard. Fifth at the 2014 Canadian Championships, Orford/Williams were not named in Canada's Olympic team but were sent to the 2014 Four Continents Championships, where they placed fifth. Their final competition together was the 2015 Canadian Championships.

=== Partnership with Arnold ===
Following a tryout with Sarah Arnold in February 2015, Williams took a year off due to an Achilles injury and financial reasons. They continued to skate together occasionally (around eight times) and began a formal partnership in March 2016. They placed 5th at the 2018 Canadian Championships and 8th at the 2018 Four Continents Championships. They are coached by Megan Wing and Aaron Lowe in Burnaby, British Columbia.

== Programs ==
=== With Arnold ===
Season	Short dance	Free dance
2017–2018	Rhumba: Bésame Mucho performed by Nana Mouskouri; Samba: Samba de Brasil performed by Casa Music and the Latin Drums	Fall For You by Leela James; If I Ain't Got You by Alicia Keys ft. Usher
2016–2017	Blues: As Time Goes By by Vera Lynn; Swing: A String of Pearls choreo. by Megan Wing, Aaron Lowe	Downton Abbey by John Lunn choreo. by Mark Pillay

=== With Orford ===
Season	Short dance	Free dance
2014–2015	España cañí by Pascual Marquina Narro; Noche Flamenca (Bulerias)	Titanic by James Horner; Titanic Suite; Jack Dawson's Luck; The Portrait
2013–2014	Quickstep: Cheek to Cheek by Frank Sinatra; Foxtrot: Fly Me To The Moon by Bart Howard	Love Never Dies by Andrew Lloyd Webber; Prologue; Beneath The Moonless Sky; Coney Island Waltz; Heaven By The Sea; Til I Hear You Sing
2012–2013	Polka: Sold by John Michael Montgomery; Waltz: Tennessee Waltz by Anne Murray; Polka: Sold by John Michael Montgomery	High Society Overture; Now You Have Jazz by Bing Crosby, Louis Armstrong; High Society Overture
2011–2012	Senior-level: Mariposa en Havana; Baila Baila Conmigo; Junior-level: Dance With Me by Debelah Morgan; Baila Baila Conmigo by Domino	Gone with the Wind by Max Steiner; Tara's Theme; War is Declared/The Death of Charles
2010–2011	Waltz: Norwegian Wood (This Bird Has Flown); Quickstep: Help! by The Beatles	How You Remind Me; This Love; Dare You To Move by Vitamin String Quartet

== Competitive highlights ==
GP: Grand Prix; CS: Challenger Series; JGP: Junior Grand Prix

=== With Arnold ===
International
Event	16–17	17–18
Four Continents		8th
CS Warsaw Cup		8th
Lake Placid IDI	10th	9th
National
Canadian Champ.	6th	5th
SC Challenge	4th	2nd
BC/YK Sectionals	2nd	2nd

=== With Orford ===
International
Event	10–11	11–12	12–13	13–14	14–15
Four Continents			6th	5th	
GP Bompard				8th	
GP NHK Trophy			4th		
GP Rostelecom Cup			8th		
GP Skate America					8th
CS Autumn Classic					6th
CS U.S. Classic					2nd
U.S. Classic				3rd	
International: Junior
Junior Worlds	8th	6th			
JGP Australia		1st			
JGP Austria		6th			
JGP Czech Republic	5th				
JGP U.K.	3rd				
National
Canadian Champ.	1st J	6th	3rd	5th	4th
J = Junior level

=== Early partnerships ===
National
Event	07–08^{1}	08–09^{2}	09–10^{2}
Canadian Championships	17th J	14th J	9th J
^{1} With Alicia Williams^{2} With Olga Lioudvinevitch; J = Junior level
