= Mary Beth Marley =

American pair skater (born 1995)

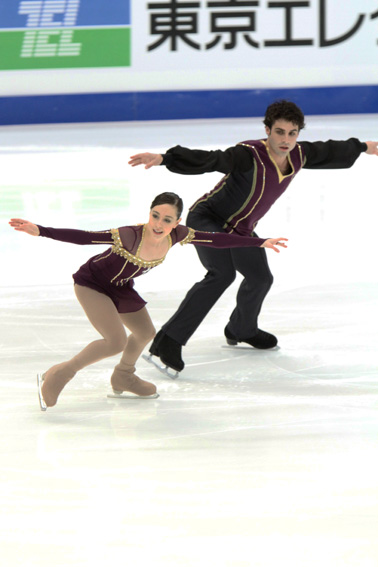
- Marley and Brubaker in 2011

Personal information
- Full name: Mary Beth Marley
- Born: May 19, 1995 (age 31) Naperville, Illinois, U.S.
- Home town: Downers Grove, Illinois, U.S.
- Height: 4 ft 9 in (1.46 m)

Figure skating career
- Country: United States
- Began skating: 2002
Medal record
Pairs figure skating
Representing United States
Four Continents Championships
Bronze medal – third place	2012 Colorado Springs	Pairs

Mary Beth Marley (born May 19, 1995) is an American pair skater. With former partner Rockne Brubaker, she is the 2012 Four Continents bronze medalist and 2012 U.S. silver medalist. Previously, Marley competed in single skating and became the 2009 U.S. novice silver medalist.

== Career ==
=== Singles career ===
Marley won the novice silver medal at the 2009 U.S. Championships. She was 5th on the junior level in 2011.

=== Partnership with Brubaker ===
Marley and Brubaker teamed up after a two-day tryout in August 2010. She was previously a singles skater and had no pairs experience but passed her pairs test on August 31, 2010. The pair was coached by John Nicks. Marley relocated to Aliso Viejo, California.

Marley and Brubaker's first international competition was the Toruń Cup in Toruń, Poland, where they earned the minimum technical scores required to compete at an ISU Championship. They placed fourth at the 2011 U.S. Nationals and were named as alternates for Four Continents. They were assigned to the event after an injury led Caydee Denney and Jeremy Barrett to withdraw. Jenni Meno and Todd Sand became their main coaches for the 2011–12 season and Nicks also continued to work with the pair.

In the 2012–2013 season, Marley and Brubaker were assigned to 2012 Skate Canada International and 2012 NHK Trophy, however, on August 14, 2012, the pair announced the end of their partnership. Marley decided to step away from competitive figure skating She works as a coach and choreographer in Chicago.

== Programs ==
=== With Brubaker ===
Season	Short program	Free skating
2011–2012	Singin' in the Rain	Piano Concerto No. 2 in C Minor by Sergei Rachmaninoff
2010–2011	Elizabeth: The Golden Age by Craig Armstrong, A. R. Rahman	The Addams Family by Marc Shaiman

=== As singles skater ===
Season	Short program	Free skating
2010–2011	Clair de Lune by Claude Debussy	Tango Jalousie by Jacob Gade
2009–2010	L-O-V-E (instrumental) by Nat King Cole	Cinderella by Sergei Prokofiev performed by the Cleveland Orchestra
2008–2009	Beethoven by Trans-Siberian Orchestra	Asturias (Leyenda) by Vanessa-Mae

== Competitive highlights ==
=== Pairs career with Brubaker ===
Results
International
Event	2010–2011	2011–2012
Worlds		10th
Four Continents	8th	3rd
GP Skate America		7th
Cup of Nice		3rd
Toruń Cup	1st	
National
U.S. Champ.	4th	2nd
GP = Grand Prix

=== Singles career ===
Event	2010–11
U.S. Championships	5th J.
