= Haruka Imai =

Japanese figure skater

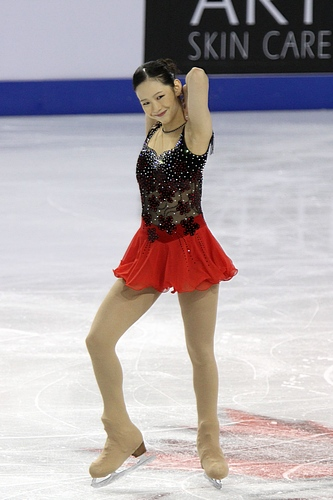
- Imai at the 2010 Skate Canada International

Personal information
- Born: August 31, 1993 (age 33) Tokyo, Japan
- Height: 1.59 m (5 ft 3 in)

Figure skating career
- Country: Japan
- Coach: Rumiko Michigami
- Skating club: Niigata Skating Federation
- Began skating: 2003
- Retired: March 2, 2018
Medal record
Representing Japan
Figure skating: Ladies' singles
Asian Winter Games
| Silver medal – second place | 2011 Astana-Almaty | Ladies' singles |

Haruka Imai (今井 遥, Imai Haruka; born August 31, 1993) is a Japanese former figure skater. She has won nine senior international medals and competed at three Four Continents Championships, placing as high as fourth. She is the 2008 Japanese Junior national champion.

== Personal life ==
Imai was born on August 31, 1993 in Tokyo, Japan.

In July 2024, she married fellow retired figure skater, Yu Nakamura.

== Career ==
Imai began skating at age 9. In the 2008–09 season, Imai began competing on the Junior Grand Prix series. She won her JGP event in Belarus and went on to win the Japanese Junior title. She was 16th at the 2009 World Junior Championships. In 2009, Imai won bronze at her sole JGP event, in Hungary. She placed 6th on the senior level at the Japan Championships and was assigned to the 2010 Four Continents Championships, where she placed 5th. In 2010, Imai won gold at the Ondrej Nepela Memorial and debuted on the senior Grand Prix series, placing 5th at the 2010 Skate Canada International and 6th at the 2010 Trophee Eric Bompard.

In summer 2011, Imai sustained a stress fracture in her foot, keeping her off the ice for about two months. In September 2011, she moved to Detroit to be coached by Yuka Sato and Jason Dungjen. She won bronze at the 2012 Nebelhorn Trophy. Imai returned to Japan in 2013, joining Rumiko Michigami. She won gold at the 2013 Ondrej Nepela Trophy. At the Japan Championships, Imai finished 5th.

She retired from competitive figure skating in 2018. In late 2025, she and her husband, Yu Nakamura, began working as coaches at the "MAO RINK" in Tachikawa, Tokyo, a figure skating rink that was opened by Mao Asada the previous year.

== Programs ==
| Season | Short program | Free skating | Exhibition |
|---|---|---|---|
| 2015–16 | Malagueña by Ernesto Lecuona choreo. by Pasquale Camerlengo | Piano Concerto in A-flat major by Saint-Preux choreo. by Pasquale Camerlengo | |
| 2014–15 | Malagueña by Ernesto Lecuona choreo. by Pasquale Camerlengo | Giselle by Adolphe Adam choreo. by Phillip Mills | |
| 2013–14 | Song without words in D major, Op.109 by Felix Mendelssohn choreo. by Natalia Bestemianova, Igor Bobrin | Piano Concerto in A-flat major by Saint-Preux choreo. by Pasquale Camerlengo | |
| 2012–13 | Charade (1963 film) | Divertimento in B flat major, K. 137 (Salzburg Symphony No. 2): II. Allegro di molto; Violin Sonata in F major, K. 376 (374d): II. Andante; Eine kleine Nachtmusik (Serenade No. 13 for strings in G major), K. 525: IV Rondo: Allegro | Pure Imagination |
| 2011–12 | Song without words in D major, Op.109 by Felix Mendelssohn choreo. by Yuka Sato | My Fair Lady (modern arrangement) choreo. by Yuka Sato | I'm into Something Good by The Bird and the Bee choreo. by Yuka Sato |
| 2010–11 | Gypsy Dance (from Don Quixote) by Ludwig Minkus | Polovtsian Dances by Alexander Borodin | Cartoon Heroes by Aqua |
| 2009–10 | Fiesta Flamenca by Monty Kelly | Raymonda by Alexander Glazunov | |
| 2008–09 | The Barber of Seville by Gioachino Rossini | Finding Neverland by Jan A. P. Kaczmarek | Somewhere by Sweetbox |

== Competitive highlights ==
GP: Grand Prix; CS: Challenger Series; JGP: Junior Grand Prix

International
| Event | 07–08 | 08–09 | 09–10 | 10–11 | 11–12 | 12–13 | 13–14 | 14–15 | 15–16 | 16–17 |
|---|---|---|---|---|---|---|---|---|---|---|
| Four Continents | | | 5th | | 9th | | 4th | | | |
| GP Bompard | | | | 6th | | | | 8th | 9th | |
| GP Cup of China | | | | | | | 6th | | | |
| GP NHK Trophy | | | | | | 8th | | | | |
| GP Rostelecom | | | | | 6th | | 9th | | | |
| GP Skate America | | | | | 4th | 5th | | 8th | 10th | |
| GP Skate Canada | | | | 5th | | | | | | |
| CS Nepela Trophy | | | | | | | | 5th | | |
| Asian Games | | | | 2nd | | | | | | |
| Autumn Classic | | | | | | | | | 2nd | |
| Challenge Cup | | | | | | | 2nd | | | |
| Cup of Nice | | | 3rd | | | | | | | |
| Gardena | | | | 3rd | | 2nd | | | | |
| Ice Challenge | | | 5th | | | | | | | |
| Nebelhorn Trophy | | | | | | 3rd | | | | |
| Nepela Trophy | | | | 1st | | | 1st | | | |
International: Junior
| Junior Worlds | | 16th | | | | | | | | |
| JGP Belarus | | 1st | | | | | | | | |
| JGP Hungary | | | 3rd | | | | | | | |
National
| Japan Champ. | | 14th | 6th | 12th | 4th | 14th | 5th | 11th | 15th | 19th |
| Japan Junior | 7th | 1st | 2nd | | | | | | | |
WD = Withdrew

=== Detailed results ===
Small medals for short program and free skating awarded only at ISU Championships.

2013–14 season
| Date | Event | Level | SP | FS | Total |
|---|---|---|---|---|---|
| January 20–26, 2014 | 2014 Four Continents Championships | Senior | 3; 62.72 | 6; 112.68 | 4; 175.40 |
| December 20–23, 2013 | 2013–14 Japan Championships | Senior | 6; 60.63 | 4; 125.53 | 5; 186.16 |
| November 22–24, 2013 | 2013 Cup of Russia | Senior | 8; 49.55 | 9; 95.75 | 9; 145.30 |
| November 1–3, 2013 | 2013 Cup of China | Senior | 5; 54.79 | 6; 95.51 | 6; 150.30 |
| October 3–5, 2013 | 2013 Ondrej Nepela Trophy | Senior | 2; 52.71 | 1; 110.93 | 1; 163.64 |
2012–13 season
| Date | Event | Level | SP | FS | Total |
| April 1–3, 2013 | 2013 Gardena Spring Trophy | Senior | 7; 46.67 | 2; 107.52 | 2; 154.19 |
| December 20–24, 2012 | 2012–13 Japan Championships | Senior | 18; 47.30 | 13; 90.62 | 14; 137.92 |
| November 23–25, 2012 | 2012 NHK Trophy | Senior | 9; 48.10 | 8; 97.32 | 8; 145.42 |
| October 19–21, 2012 | 2012 Skate America | Senior | 7; 49.90 | 4; 107.82 | 5; 157.72 |
| September 27–29, 2012 | 2012 Nebelhorn Trophy | Senior | 9; 47.70 | 3; 105.94 | 3; 153.64 |
2011–12 season
| Date | Event | Level | SP | FS | Total |
| February 7–12, 2012 | 2012 Four Continents Championships | Senior | 11; 45.19 | 9; 89.30 | 9; 134.49 |
| December 22–26, 2011 | 2011–12 Japan Championships | Senior | 5; 57.82 | 5; 108.85 | 4; 166.67 |
| November 25–27, 2011 | 2011 Cup of Russia | Senior | 6; 55.20 | 6; 99.56 | 6; 154.76 |
| October 21–23, 2011 | 2011 Skate America | Senior | 4; 54.67 | 9; 88.27 | 4; 142.94 |
2010–11 season
| Date | Event | Level | SP | FS | Total |
| March 31 – April 1, 2011 | 2011 Gardena Spring Trophy | Senior | 2; 47.89 | 3; 88.43 | 3; 136.32 |
| January 3–5, 2011 | 2011 Asian Winter Games | Senior | 2; 54.02 | 2; 112.98 | 2; 167.00 |
| December 24–27, 2010 | 2010–11 Japan Championships | Senior | 17; 45.96 | 11; 93.59 | 12; 139.55 |
| November 26–28, 2010 | 2010 Trophée Eric Bompard | Senior | 3; 58.38 | 9; 87.09 | 6; 145.47 |
| October 28–31, 2010 | 2010 Skate Canada | Senior | 6; 52.52 | 3; 102.02 | 5; 154.54 |
| Sept. 30 – Oct. 2, 2010 | 2010 Ondrej Nepela Memorial | Senior | 1; 54.61 | 2; 87.01 | 1; 141.62 |
2009–10 season
| Date | Event | Level | SP | FS | Total |
| January 25–31, 2010 | 2010 Four Continents Championships | Senior | 5; 55.06 | 6; 100.23 | 5; 155.29 |
| December 25–27, 2009 | 2009–10 Japanese Championships | Senior | 7; 55.98 | 6; 110.18 | 6; 166.16 |
| November 21–23, 2009 | 2009–10 Japan Junior Championships | Junior | 3; 49.82 | 2; 94.15 | 2; 143.97 |
| November 4–8, 2009 | 2009 Coupe de Nice | Senior | 3; 51.46 | 3; 90.00 | 3; 141.46 |
| Oct. 28 – Nov. 1, 2009 | 2009 Ice Challenge | Senior | 5; 52.48 | 5; 83.14 | 5; 135.62 |
| August 26–29, 2009 | 2009 Junior Grand Prix, Hungary | Junior | 4; 47.95 | 3; 83.18 | 3; 131.13 |
2008–09 season
| Date | Event | Level | SP | FS | Total |
| Feb. 23 – March 1, 2009 | 2009 World Junior Championships | Junior | 17; 43.58 | 16; 69.66 | 16; 113.24 |
| December 10–14 | 2008–09 Japan Championships | Senior | 16; 43.86 | 14; 77.53 | 14; 121.39 |
| November 23–24, 2008 | 2008–09 Japan Junior Championships | Junior | 2; 53.05 | 4; 91.10 | 1; 144.15 |
| October 1–4, 2008 | 2008 Junior Grand Prix, Belarus | Junior | 3; 47.60 | 1; 97.40 | 1; 145.00 |
2007–2008 season
| Date | Event | Level | SP | FS | Total |
| November 24–25, 2007 | 2007–08 Japan Junior Championships | Junior | 7; 43.42 | 9; 76.57 | 7; 119.99 |
