= Song Nan =

Chinese former competitive figure skater (born 1990)

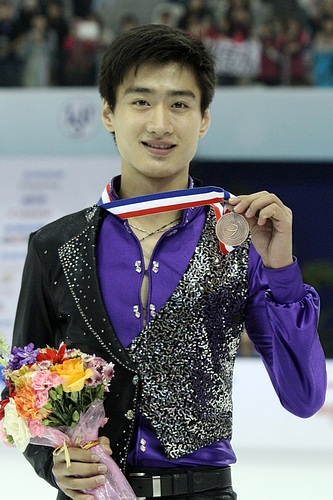
- Song Nan in 2011

Personal information
- Full name: 宋楠
- Born: August 9, 1990 (age 35) Qiqihar, Heilongjiang
- Height: 1.78 m (5 ft 10 in)

Figure skating career
- Country: China
- Coach: Li Wei
- Skating club: Qiqihar Winter Sports Club
- Began skating: 1996
- Retired: April 4, 2016
Medal record
Figure skating: Men's singles
Representing China
Four Continents Championships
Bronze medal – third place	2014 Taipei	Men's singles
Asian Winter Games
Bronze medal – third place	2011 Astana-Almaty	Men's singles
Winter Universiade
Gold medal – first place	2013 Trentino	Men's singles
National Games
Gold medal – first place	2012 Changchun	Men's singles
World Junior Championships
Silver medal – second place	2010 The Hague	Men's singles
Junior Grand Prix Final
Silver medal – second place	2009–2010 Tokyo	Men's singles

Song Nan (Chinese: 宋楠; pinyin: Sòng Nán; born August 9, 1990) is a Chinese former competitive figure skater. He is the 2014 Four Continents bronze medalist, the 2013 Winter Universiade champion, the 2010 World Junior silver medalist, a two-time senior Grand Prix medalist, and a three-time Chinese national champion (2009, 2012, 2013).

== Career ==
Song started skating at age six. His parents put him in skating to improve his health. He lived and trained at Beijing's Capital Gymnasium Sports Complex, which includes dormitories.

In 2009–10, his final season as a junior, Song won two Junior Grand Prix (JGP) medals – silver in Belarus and gold in Germany – to qualify for the JGP Final. He won silver behind Yuzuru Hanyu at both the JGP Final and the 2010 World Junior Championships.

Song turned senior in 2010–11 and won the bronze medal at the 2011 Asian Winter Games. In the 2011–12 season, Song won two Grand Prix medals, bronze at the 2011 Cup of China and silver at the 2011 Trophee Eric Bompard. He was the first alternate for the Grand Prix Final.

Song withdrew from the 2012 Cup of China after sustaining a concussion in a collision with American skater Adam Rippon a minute into the final warm up before the free skate. Song was kept in the hospital overnight for observation. Although 14 days rest was recommended, he decided to compete at his next assignment, the 2012 Trophee Eric Bompard, finishing 5th. He then won the gold medal at the 2013 Chinese Championships.

In the 2013–14 season, Song won gold at the 2013 Winter Universiade and bronze at the 2014 Four Continents Championships.

Song had spondylopathy affecting his lower back in particular. He placed 9th at the 2015 Cup of China and 12th at the 2016 Four Continents Championships. He announced his retirement from competitive skating on April 4, 2016.

== Programs ==
Season	Short program	Free skating	Exhibition
2015–16	Michael Meets Mozart by Jon Schmidt performed by The Piano Guys choreo. by David Wilson	Seven Swords by Kenji Kawai choreo. by David Wilson	
2014–15	Night Train	Sarabande Suite by Yoav Goren	
2013–14	Nihavent Longa; Double Doom Drum Solo from the album "The Middle East Side" by Djinn choreo. by Jeffrey Buttle; Guitar Concerto by Michael Kamen choreo. by Lori Nichol	The Mission by Ennio Morricone choreo. by Lori Nichol	One Rainy Night; Ambush from All Sides by Zhao Cong
2012–13	Nihavent Longa; Double Doom Drum Solo from the album "The Middle East Side" by Djinn choreo. by Jeffrey Buttle	Symphony No. 4 by Pyotr Tchaikovsky; Romeo and Juliet Overture by Pyotr Tchaikovsky choreo. by Jeffrey Buttle	Sarabande Suite (Aeternae) by Globus
2011–12	Requiem for a Dream by Clint Mansell	Hungarian Rhapsody No. 2 by Franz Liszt	Sarabande Suite (Aeternae) by Globus
2010–11	Requiem for a Dream by Clint Mansell	Yellow River Piano Concerto by Xian Xinghai	
2009–10	The Way Old Friends Do by ABBA	Once Upon a Time in America by Ennio Morricone	Footprints in the Sand by Leona Lewis
2008–09		Once Upon a Time in America by Ennio Morricone	Footprints in the Sand by Leona Lewis
2007–08	Toccata and Fugue in D minor, BWV 565		You Raise Me Up

== Competitive highlights ==
International
Event	07–08	08–09	09–10	10–11	11–12	12–13	13–14	14–15	15–16
Worlds				22nd	14th	15th		26th	
Four Continents			6th	9th	11th	6th	3rd		12th
GP Bompard				6th	2nd	5th	6th		
GP Cup of China					3rd	WD	8th		9th
GP Skate America				10th					
Asian Games				3rd					
Universiade							1st	4th	
International: Junior
Junior Worlds		7th	2nd						
JGP Final			2nd						
JGP Belarus			2nd						
JGP France		5th							
JGP Germany			1st						
JGP Mexico		5th							
JGP United Kingdom	4th								
National
National Games		5th			1st				3rd
Chinese Champ.	5th	1st	7th	2nd	1st	1st	2nd		2nd
Team events
World Team Trophy								5th T (11th P)	
T = Team result, P = Personal result

== Detailed results ==
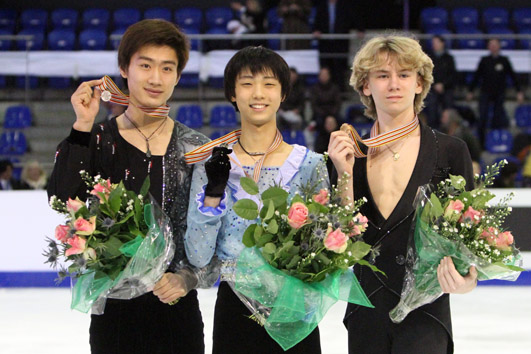
Song at the 2010 World Junior Championships

2011–12 season
Date	Event	SP	FS	Total
March 27 - April 1, 2012	2012 World Championships	15; 69.58	12; 146.75	14; 216.33
February 7 – 12, 2012	2012 Four Continents Championships	8; 69.34	11; 121.17	11; 190.51
January 4 – 6, 2012	12th Chinese National Winter Games	1; 85.29	2; 152.55	1; 237.84
November 18–20, 2011	2011 Trophée Eric Bompard	2; 76.53	2; 147.57	2; 224.10
November 4–6, 2011	2011 Cup of China	5; 72.72	1; 154.03	3; 226.75
September 20–23, 2011	2012 Chinese Championships	2; 65.28	1; 151.67	1; 216.95
2010–11 season
Date	Event	SP	FS	Total
April 25 - May 1, 2011	2011 World Championships	20; 63.78	23; 112.31	22; 176.09
February 20–25, 2011	2011 Four Continents Championships	12; 60.47	8; 134.66	9; 195.13
February 3–4, 2011	2011 Asian Winter Games	4; 66.54	2; 134.56	3; 201.10
December 23–24, 2010	2011 Chinese Championships	2; 69.12	3; 126.53	2; 195.65
November 25–28, 2010	2010 Trophée Eric Bompard	8; 62.88	5; 118.65	6; 181.53
November 11–14, 2010	2010 Skate America	9; 62.21	10; 117.89	10; 180.10

2009–10 season
Date	Event	Level	SP	FS	Total
March 8–14, 2010	2010 World Junior Championships	Junior	5; 67.97	2; 137.28	2; 205.25
January 25–31, 2010	2010 Four Continents Championships	Senior	2; 72.95	6; 136.73	6; 209.68
February 21–28, 2009	2010 Chinese Championships	Senior	5; 59.80	8; 101.59	7; 161.39
December 2–6, 2009	ISU Junior Grand Prix Final	Junior	1; 71.70	2; 133.29	2; 204.99
September 20 - October 3, 2009	ISU Junior Grand Prix, Germany	Junior	4; 57.08	1; 130.63	1; 187.71
September 23–26, 2009	ISU Junior Grand Prix, Belarus	Junior	4; 55.52	1; 122.59	2; 178.11
2008–09 season
Date	Event	Level	SP	FS	Total
February 21–28, 2009	2009 World Junior Championships	Junior	10; 58.70	5; 116.74	7; 175.44
February 21–28, 2009	2009 Chinese Championships	Senior	1; 65.41	2; 126.43	1; 277.02*
September 10–14, 2008	ISU Junior Grand Prix, Mexico	Junior	6; 52.03	7; 95.77	5; 147.80
August 27–30, 2007	ISU Junior Grand Prix, France	Junior	6; 54.43	6; 107.20	5; 161.63
2007–08 season
Date	Event	Level	SP	FS	Total
September 18–21, 2007	ISU Junior Grand Prix, U.K.	Junior	3; 59.42	4; 110.18	4; 169.60

- At the 2009 Chinese Championships, Song scored 277.02 points overall because there was an additional interpretive segment in the competition.
