= Lee Dong-won (figure skater) =

South Korean figure skater (born 1996)

Personal information
- Native name: 이동원
- Born: November 18, 1996 (age 29) Seoul, South Korea
- Height: 1.76 m (5 ft 9 1/2 in)

Figure skating career
- Country: South Korea
- Coach: Lee Kyu-hyun
- Began skating: 2003

Lee Dong-won (Korean: 이동원; born November 18, 1996) is a South Korean figure skater. He is the 2011 South Korean national senior champion and competed in the free skate at the 2014 Four Continents Championships.

== Programs ==
Season	Short program	Free skating
2016–2017	Tango	Carmen by Georges Bizet
2013–2014	Concerto for Guitar and Orchestra by Salvador Bacarisse	Allegro con brio (from Piano Concerto No. 3) by Ludwig van Beethoven
2010–2012	Requiem	Pirates of the Caribbean by Klaus Badelt, Hans Zimmer

== Competitive highlights ==
CS: Challenger Series; JGP: Junior Grand Prix

International
Event	06–07	07–08	08–09	09–10	10–11	11–12	12–13	13–14	14–15	15–16	16–17
Four Continents								19th			
Asian Trophy								5th			
Universiade											30th
International: Junior
Junior Worlds					30th						
JGP Australia						5th					
JGP Japan					11th						
JGP Poland								13th			
JGP Romania					4th	5th					
JGP Slovakia								15th			
JGP Slovenia							14th				
Asian Trophy						3rd J.					
New Zealand WG						1st J.					
National
South Korean		3rd J.	1st J.	2nd	1st	4th	3rd	3rd	WD	8th	8th
J. = Junior level
