= ISU Junior Grand Prix in Belarus =

International figure skating competition

Junior Grand Prix in Belarus
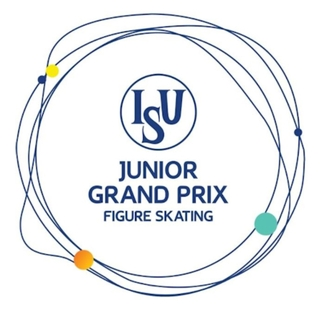
- Status: Inactive
- Genre: ISU Junior Grand Prix
- Frequency: Occasional
- Country: Belarus
- Inaugurated: 2008
- Most recent: 2017
- Organizer: Skating Union of Belarus

The ISU Junior Grand Prix in Belarus is an international figure skating competition sanctioned by the International Skating Union (ISU), organized and hosted by the Skating Union of Belarus. It is held periodically as an event of the ISU Junior Grand Prix of Figure Skating (JGP), a series of international competitions exclusively for junior-level skaters. Medals may be awarded in men's singles, women's singles, pair skating, and ice dance. Skaters earn points based on their results at the qualifying competitions each season, and the top skaters or teams in each discipline are invited to then compete at the Junior Grand Prix of Figure Skating Final.

== History ==
The ISU Junior Grand Prix of Figure Skating (JGP) was established by the International Skating Union (ISU) in 1997 and consists of a series of seven international figure skating competitions exclusively for junior-level skaters. The locations of the Junior Grand Prix events change every year. While all seven competitions feature the men's, women's, and ice dance events, only four competitions each season feature the pairs event. Skaters earn points based on their results each season, and the top skaters or teams in each discipline are then invited to compete at the Junior Grand Prix of Figure Skating Final.

Skaters are eligible to compete on the junior-level circuit if they are at least 13 years old before 1 July of the respective season, but not yet 19 (for single skaters), 21 (for men and women in ice dance and women in pair skating), or 23 (for men in pair skating). Competitors are chosen by their respective skating federations. The number of entries allotted to each ISU member nation in each discipline is determined by their results at the prior World Junior Figure Skating Championships.

Belarus hosted its first Junior Grand Prix competition – called the Golden Lynx – in 2008 in Gomel. Denis Ten of Kazakhstan won the men's event, Haruka Imai of Japan won the women's event, Liubov Ilyushechkina and Nodari Maisuradze of Russia won the pairs event, and Alisa Agafonova and Dmitri Dun of Ukraine won the ice dance event.

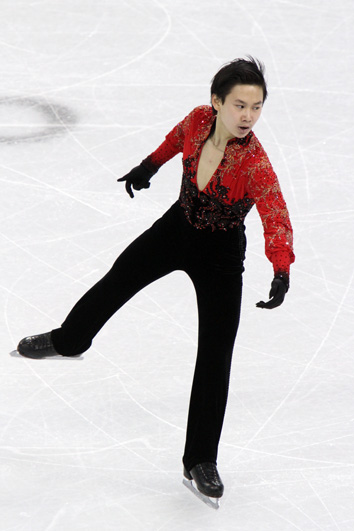
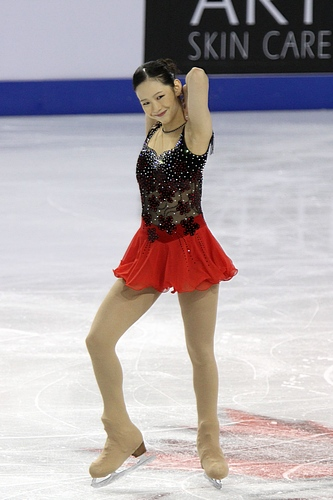
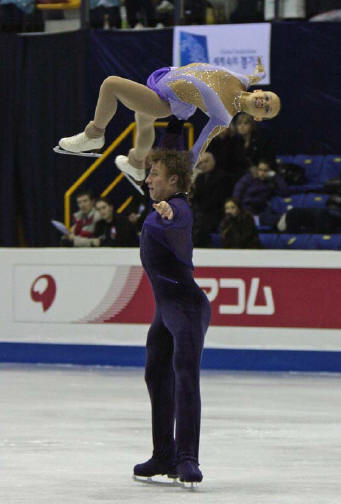
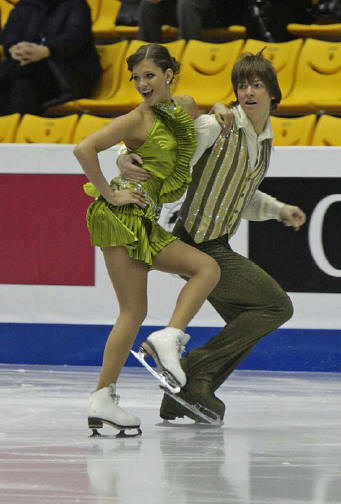
The 2008 Golden Lynx champions: Denis Ten of Kazakhstan (men's singles); Haruka Imai of Japan (women's singles); Lubov Iliushechkina and Nodari Maisuradze of Russia (pair skating); and Alisa Agafonova and Dmitri Dun of Ukraine (ice dance)

The most recent iteration of this competition was held in 2017.

== Medalists ==
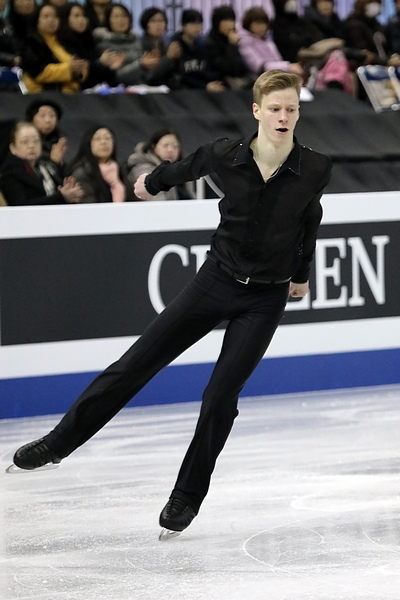
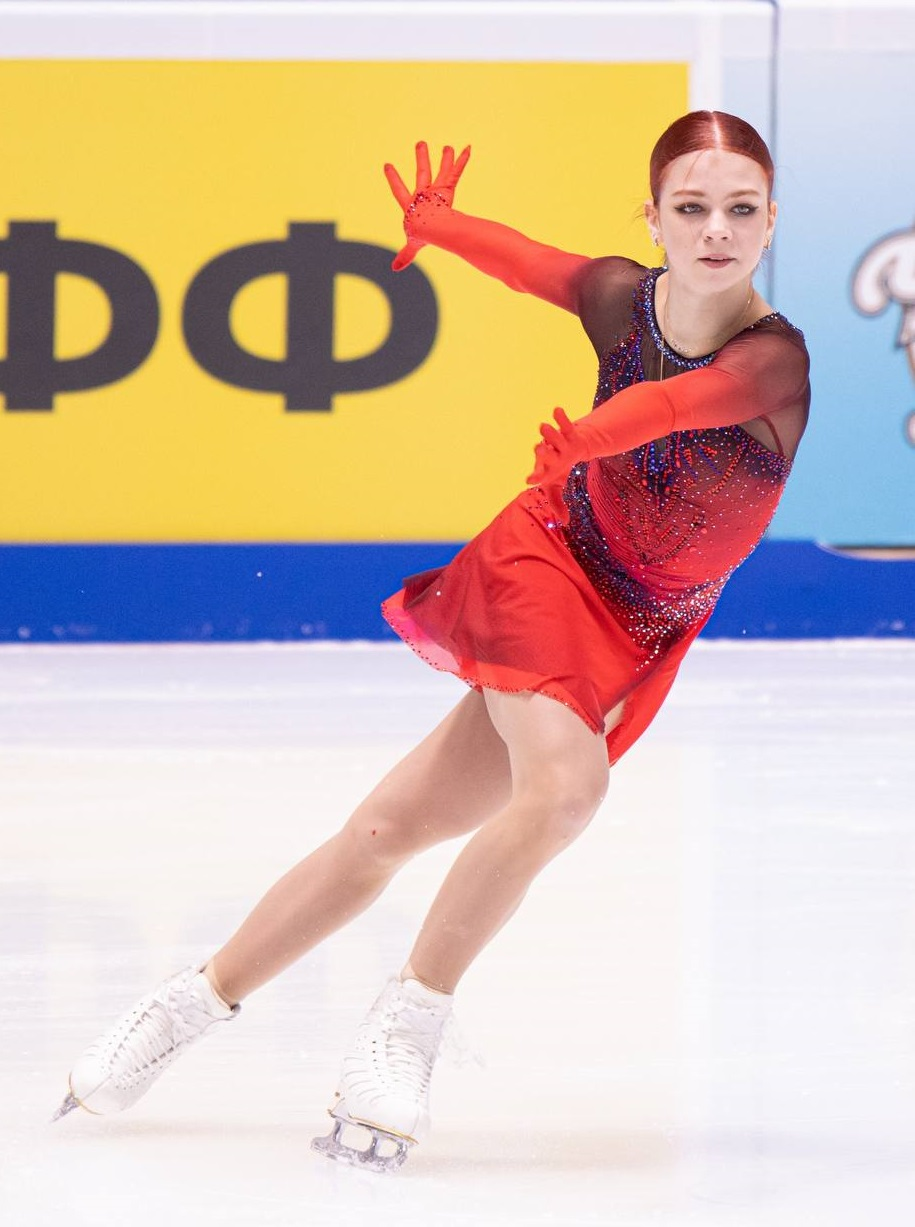
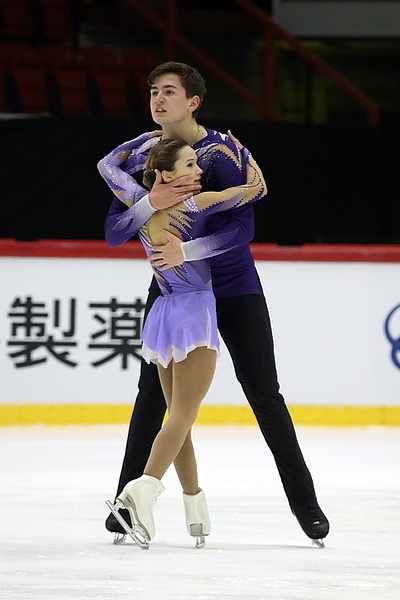
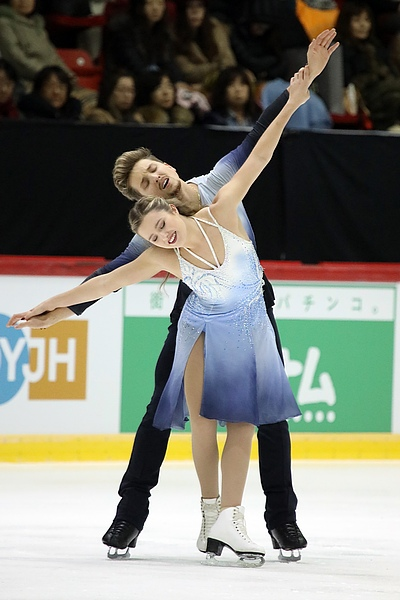
The 2017 Minsk Arena Cup champions: Alexey Erokhov of Russia (men's singles); Alexandra Trusova of Russia (women's singles); Daria Pavliuchenko and Denis Khodykin of Russia (pair skating); and Christina Carreira and Anthony Ponomarenko of the United States (ice dance)

=== Men's singles ===
Men's event medalists
Year	Location	Gold	Silver	Bronze	Ref.
2008	Gomel	(Kazakhstan) Denis Ten	(China) Yang Chao	(China) Cheng Gongming	
2009	Minsk	(Russia) Artur Gachinski	(China) Song Nan	(Russia) Stanislav Kovalev	
2013	Minsk	(United States) Nathan Chen	(Japan) Ryuju Hino	(Russia) Murad Kurbanov	
2017	Minsk	(Russia) Alexey Erokhov	(United States) Andrew Torgashev	(Russia) Igor Efimchuk	

=== Women's singles ===
Women's event medalists
Year	Location	Gold	Silver	Bronze	Ref.
2008	Gomel	(Japan) Haruka Imai	(Russia) Oksana Gozeva	(Japan) Kana Muramoto	
2009	Minsk	(Russia) Polina Shelepen	(Japan) Yuki Nishino	(Russia) Ksenia Makarova	
2013	Minsk	(United States) Polina Edmunds	(Kazakhstan) Elizabet Tursynbaeva	(Japan) Rika Hongo	
2017	Minsk	(Russia) Alexandra Trusova	(Japan) Nana Araki	(Russia) Stanislava Konstantinova	

=== Pairs ===
Pairs event medalists
Year	Location	Gold	Silver	Bronze	Ref.
2008	Gomel	(Russia); Lubov Iliushechkina; Nodari Maisuradze	(Russia); Ksenia Ozerova; Alexander Enbert	(China); Zhang Yue; Wang Lei	
2009	Minsk	(China); Sui Wenjing; Han Cong	(China); Zhang Yue; Wang Lei	(Canada); Kaleigh Hole; Adam Johnson	
2013	Minsk	(Russia); Kamilla Gainetdinova; Ivan Bich	(United States); Madeline Aaron; Max Settlage	(Russia); Vasilisa Davankova; Andrei Deputat	
2017	Minsk	(Russia); Daria Pavliuchenko; Denis Khodykin	(Russia); Anastasia Poluianova; Dmitry Sopot	(Russia); Apollinariia Panfilova; Dmitry Rylov	

=== Ice dance ===
Ice dance event medalists
Year	Location	Gold	Silver	Bronze	Ref.
2008	Gomel	(Ukraine); Alisa Agafonova; Dmitri Dun	(Russia); Ekaterina Pushkash; Dmitri Kiselev	(France); Terra Findlay; Benoît Richaud	
2009	Minsk	(Russia); Ksenia Monko; Kirill Khaliavin	(United States); Rachel Tibbetts; Collin Brubaker	(Ukraine); Alisa Agafonova; Dmitri Dun	
2013	Minsk	(United States); Lorraine McNamara; Quinn Carpenter	(Russia); Betina Popova; Yuri Vlasenko	(Russia); Daria Morozova; Mikhail Zhirnov	
2017	Minsk	(United States); Christina Carreira; Anthony Ponomarenko	(Russia); Anastasia Skoptsova; Kirill Aleshin	(Russia); Arina Ushakova; Maxim Nekrasov	
