= Adrien Tesson =

French figure skater

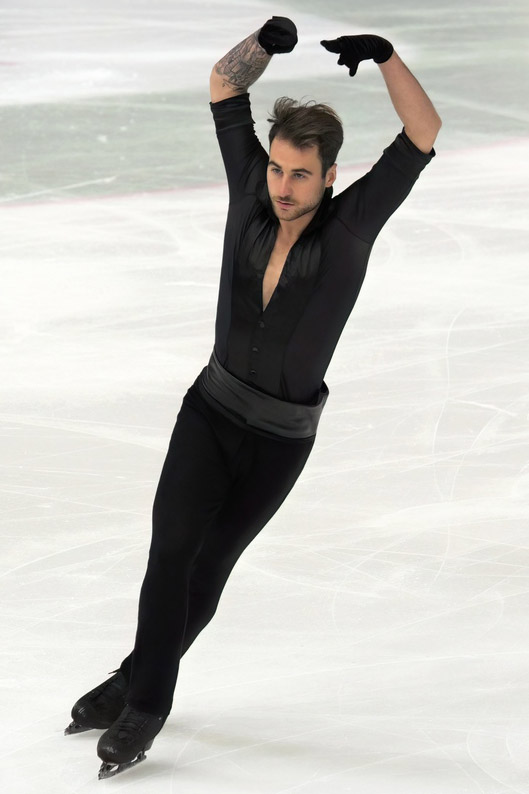
- Adrien Tesson at the 2021 Cup of Austria

Personal information
- Born: 9 May 1997 (age 29) Cherbourg-en-Cotentin, France
- Home town: Paris, France
- Height: 1.72 m (5 ft 7 1/2 in)

Figure skating career
- Country: France
- Discipline: Men's singles
- Coach: Annick Dumont; Claude Thevenard
- Skating club: CSG Champigny

Medal record
French Championships
Bronze medal – third place	2019 Vaujany	Singles

Adrien Tesson (born 9 May 1997) is a French figure skater. He is the 2018 International Challenge Cup champion, 2017 Ice Challenge bronze medalist, 2014 NRW Trophy bronze medalist, and 2019 French national bronze medalist.

== Career ==
Tesson was born in Cherbourg-en-Cotentin, France. He studied at Paris-Est Créteil University.

== Career ==
Tesson began learning to skate in 2005. He competed internationally in the novice ranks during the 2010–11 season and moved up to juniors the following season. His ISU Junior Grand Prix (JGP) debut came in September 2013. He would compete at a total of four JGP events, achieving his best result (6th) at JGP France in August 2014.

Making his senior international debut, Tesson won bronze at the NRW Trophy in November 2014.

He finished 17th at the 2017 Winter Universiade in February in Almaty, Kazakhstan. He won bronze at the Ice Challenge in November 2017 and gold at the International Challenge Cup in February 2018.

During an exhibition gala in early August 2018, Tesson cut an artery in his wrist with his skate blade when he fell on a jump. In December, he won bronze at the French Championships. In March, he placed 10th at the 2019 Winter Universiade in Krasnoyarsk, Russia.

== Programs ==
Season	Short program	Free skating
2021–2022	Way Down We Go by Kaleo choreo. by Mahil Chantelauze	El Tango de Roxanne (from Moulin Rouge!) choreo. by Mahil Chantelauze
2018–2019	Highlander by Freddie Mercury	I Found by Amber Run
2016–2017	Come Together; Get Back by The Beatles	Exogenesis: Symphony; Ruled by Secrecy by Muse choreo. by Catherine Glaise
2015–2016	Highlander by Freddie Mercury choreo. by Catherine Glaise	Exogenesis: Symphony; Ruled by Secrecy by Muse choreo. by Catherine Glaise
2014–2015	Why Don't You Do Right? choreo. by Catherine Glaise	Romeo + Juliet by Craig Armstrong choreo. by Catherine Glaise
2013–2014	Move to the Big Band by Ben Liebrand choreo. by Catherine Glaise	The Mask of Zorro by James Horner choreo. by Catherine Glaise

== Competitive highlights ==
GP: Grand Prix; CS: Challenger Series; JGP: Junior Grand Prix

International
Event	11–12	12–13	13–14	14–15	15–16	16–17	17–18	18–19	19–20	20–21	21–22
GP France									WD	C	
CS Cup of Austria											12th
CS Ice Star									7th		
CS Lombardia							20th	10th	10th		11th
CS Tallinn Trophy						6th					
Bavarian Open									7th		
Challenge Cup							1st	8th	3rd		
Coupe Printemps					8th		7th				
Cup of Nice					10th	11th	11th				7th
Cup of Tyrol						8th					
Ice Challenge							3rd				
Merano Cup					7th						
NRW Trophy				3rd							
Reykjavik IG							1st				
Toruń Cup								8th			
Volvo Open Cup								10th			
Universiade						17th		10th			
International: Junior
JGP Croatia				13th							
JGP France				6th							
JGP Poland			17th		14th						
Coupe Printemps		4th	5th	1st							
Cup of Nice	10th		6th								
EYOF		3rd									
Merano Cup	3rd										
Triglav Trophy	2nd										
National
France	7th		6th	6th	5th	6th	6th	3rd	5th		7th
France: Junior	4th		2nd	2nd	2nd						
Masters	7th J		2nd J	3rd J	2nd J	3rd	2nd	3rd	2nd	5th	6th
J = Junior level; WD = Withdrew; C = Event Cancelled
