= Léna Marrocco =

French figure skater

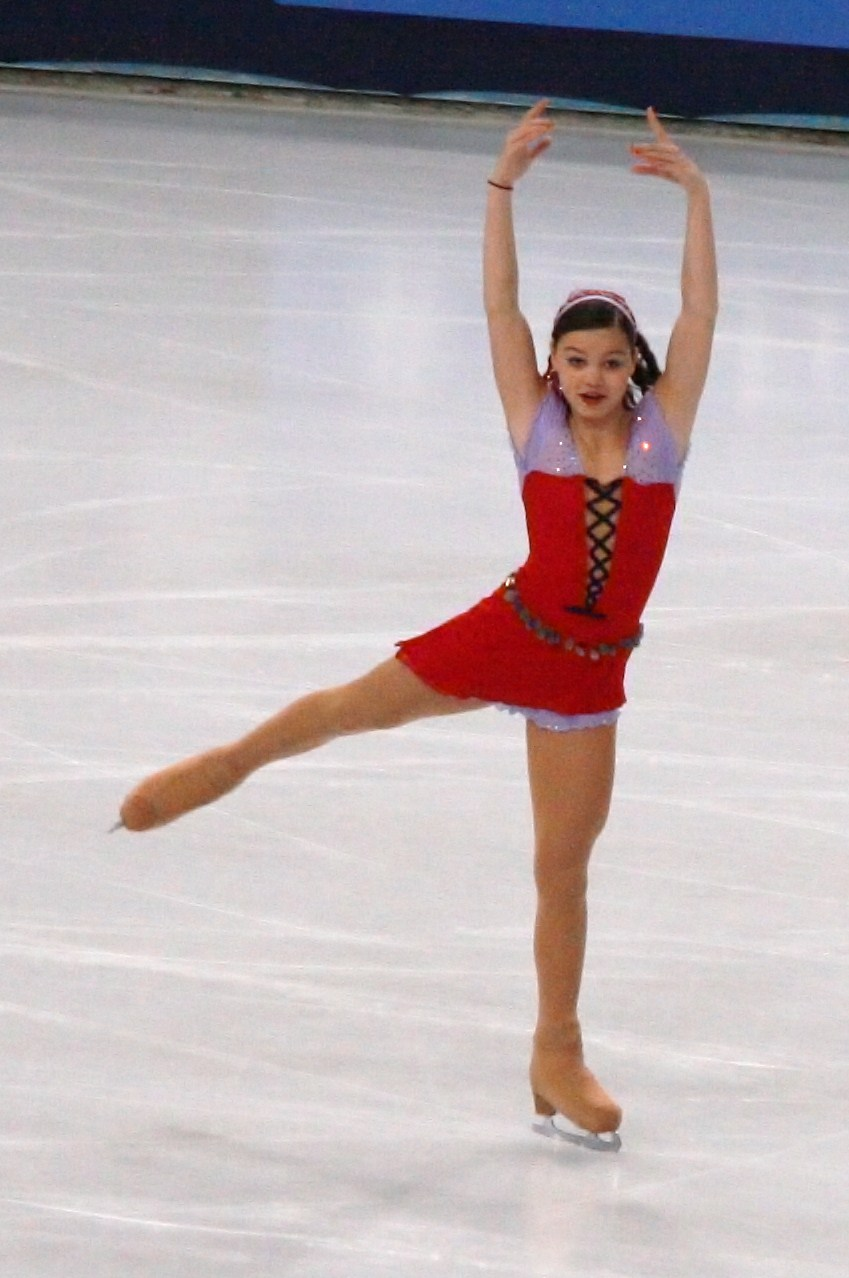
- Marrocco at the 2011 Trophée Eric Bompard

Personal information
- Born: 13 January 1995 (age 31) Saint-Aubin Les Elbeuf, France
- Height: 1.62 m (5 ft 4 in)

Figure skating career
- Country: France
- Coach: Annick Dumont
- Skating club: Sports Glace Annecy
- Began skating: 1999
- Retired: 2014

Léna Marrocco (born 13 January 1995) is a French former competitive figure skater. She is the 2010 Ice Challenge champion, 2011 Ondrej Nepela Memorial bronze medalist, and 2010 French national champion. She represented France at the 2010 World Junior Championships in The Hague, finishing 11th.

== Programs ==
Season	Short program	Free skating	Exhibition
2013–14	La Vie en rose performed by Sabrina Remember; La Vie en rose performed by Louis Armstrong	James Bond medley; Skyfall by Thomas Newman	
2012–13	No Hay Problema by Pink Martini	Rock'n'Roll	Sway performed by The Pussycat Dolls
2011–12	No Hay Problema by Pink Martini	Notre Dame de Paris by Riccardo Cocciante	
2010–11	Minnie the Moocher (from The Blues Brothers)	Sing, Sing, Sing by Louis Prima; The Mask by Randy Edelman	
2009–10	Sing, Sing, Sing by Louis Prima	I Wanna Be Loved by You (from Some Like It Hot) by Adolph Deutsch; My Heart Belongs to Daddy (from Leave it to Me)	Heart of Glass by The Puppini Sisters

== Competitive highlights ==
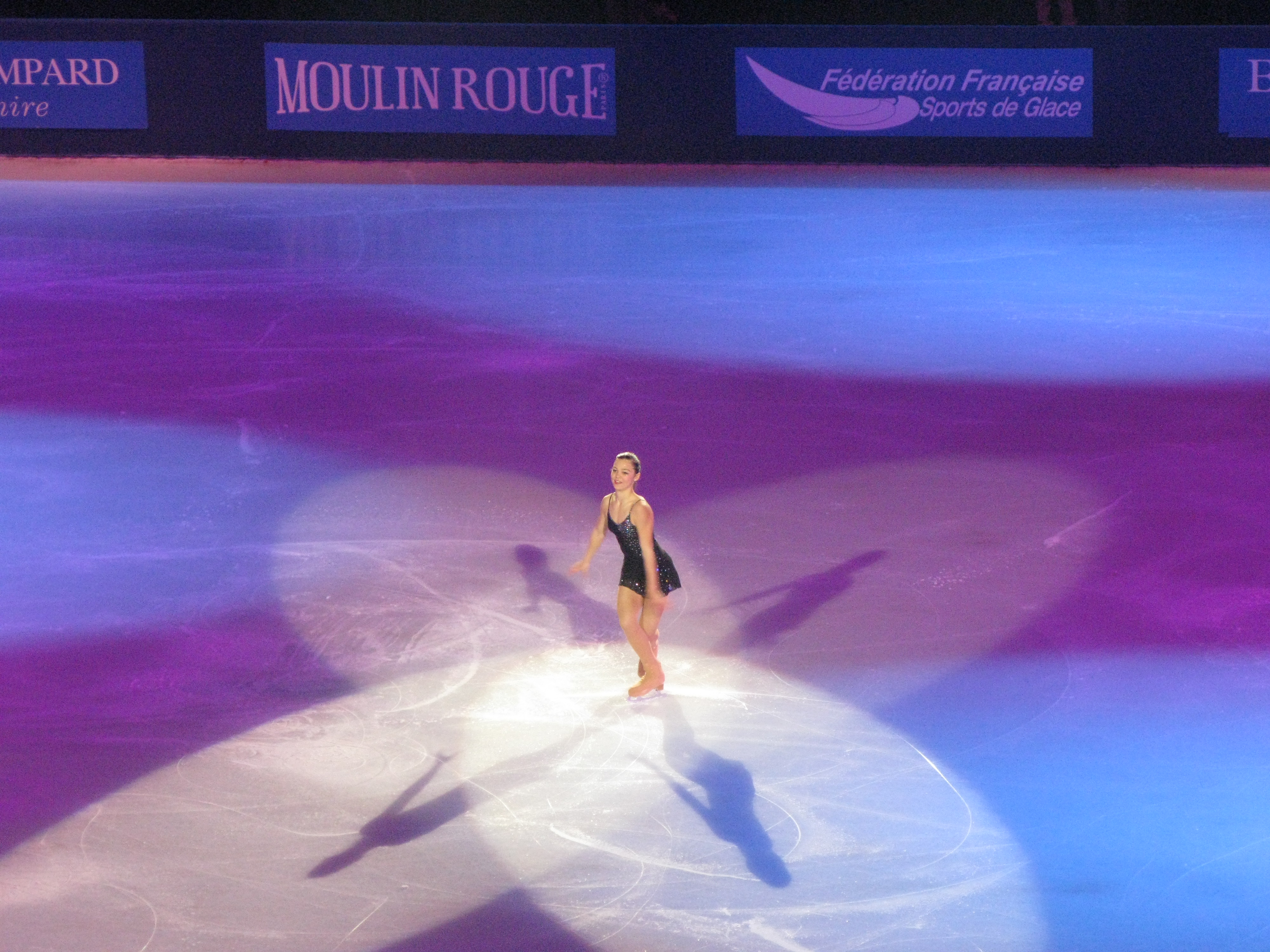
Marrocco at the 2011 Trophée Eric Bompard

GP: Grand Prix; JGP: Junior Grand Prix

International
Event	08–09	09–10	10–11	11–12	12–13	13–14
GP NHK Trophy			10th			
GP Trophée Bompard			12th	9th	10th	
Challenge Cup				6th		
Cup of Nice		7th			5th	
Ice Challenge			1st	4th		
Nepela Memorial				3rd		
Mont Blanc Trophy		1st	1st			
International: Junior or novice
World Junior Champ.		11th				
JGP Estonia						14th
JGP Poland						13th
JGP Turkey		9th				
NRW Trophy		1st J				
Cup of Nice	3rd N					
National
French Champ.	5th	1st	4th	4th	4th	5th
Masters	2nd J	2nd J	3rd	4th	3rd	
Levels – N: Novice; J: Junior
