= François Pitot (figure skater) =

French figure skater (born 2005)

Personal information
- Born: 4 January 2005 (age 21) Orléans, France
- Home town: Fribourg, Switzerland
- Height: 1.70 m (5 ft 7 in)

Figure skating career
- Country: France
- Discipline: Men's singles
- Coach: Romain Ponsart
- Skating club: USOSG
- Began skating: 2012

Medal record
French Championships
| Silver medal – second place | 2025 Annecy | Singles |
| Bronze medal – third place | 2023 Rouen | Singles |
| Bronze medal – third place | 2024 Vaujany | Singles |

François Pitot (born 4 January 2005) is a French figure skater. He is the 2025 French national silver medalist, a two-time French national bronze medalist (2023, 2024), the 2026 CS Nebelhorn Trophy bronze medalist, and the 2024 Golden Spin of Zagreb bronze medalist.

At the junior level, Pitot is the 2024 French junior national champion, 2023 JGP Japan champion, the 2023 JGP Thailand silver medalist, and the 2021 JGP France I bronze medalist.

== Personal life ==
Pitot was born on 4 January 2005 in Orléans, France.

His figure skating idol is Nathan Chen.

== Career ==
=== Early years ===
Pitot began learning how to skate in 2012 at age seven. He initially pursued football as a child, but decided to try skating as his brother and sister were already involved in the sport and quickly came to enjoy it. Didier Lucine, Claudine Lucine, Katia Gentelet, and Cédric Tour were his first coaches.

He won the 2019 French Novice Championships and finished twelfth at the Junior Championships that same year. He also won gold at the 2019 Triglav Trophy.

=== 2019–20 season: Junior Grand Prix debut ===
Coached by Brian Joubert and Cornelia Paquier in Poitiers, Pitot made his junior international debut at the 2019 JGP France, finishing twelfth. He went on to place fourth at the 2019 Master's de Patinage as well as win gold in the junior division of the 2019 Tallinn Trophy.

Debuting on the senior level at the 2020 French Championships, Pitot finished eighth.

Elected to represent France at the 2020 Winter Youth Olympics in Lausanne, Switzerland, Pitot finished thirteenth. Pitot would then end the season by competing at the 2020 French Novice Championships, winning gold for a second consecutive time.

=== 2020–21 season ===
Due to the COVID-19 pandemic, Pitot only competed domestically during the 2020–21 season. He won gold on the junior level at the 2020 Master's de Patinage and competed on the senior level at the 2021 French Championships, finishing fifth.

=== 2021–22 season: Junior Grand Prix bronze ===
Prior to the season, Pitot relocated to Vaujany to train under Florent Amodio and Sofia Amodio. He began the season by competing on the 2021–22 ISU Junior Grand Prix, winning bronze at 2021 JGP France I and finishing sixth at 2021 JGP Slovenia. He subsequently won gold on the junior level at the 2021 Master's de Patinage and the 2021 Cup of Nice.

At the 2022 French Championships, Pitot would place sixth on the senior level and win silver on the junior level. Between the two national events, Pitot would also take bronze on the junior level at the 2022 Bavarian Open.

Selected to compete at the 2022 European Youth Olympic Winter Festival in Vuokatti, Finland, Pitot would finish sixth at the event. He would then go on to compete at the 2022 World Junior Championships in Tallinn, Estonia where he placed thirtieth and fail to advance to the free skate segment of the competition.

After the season ended, Pitot moved to Fribourg, where Romain Ponsart became his new coach.

=== 2022–23 season: Senior international debut ===
Pitot began the season by competing on the 2022–23 ISU Junior Grand Prix, finishing sixth at 2021 JGP Poland I and fifth at 2021 JGP Poland II. He would go on to win gold on the junior level at the 2022 Master's de Patinage.

Making his senior international debut at the 2022 CS Ice Challenge, Pitot placed fifteenth in the short program but won the free skate with a personal best by over twenty-five points. He would finish in fifth place overall.

He would go on to win the bronze medal on the senior level at the 2023 French Championships. Pitot ultimately closed his season by finishing twelfth at the 2023 World Junior Championships in Calgary, Alberta, Canada.

=== 2023–24 season: French junior national champion ===
Pitot started the season by competing on the 2023–24 ISU Junior Grand Prix, winning silver at 2023 JGP Thailand and gold at 2023 JGP Japan. With these results, Pitot qualified for the 2023–24 Junior Grand Prix Final. He subsequently competed on the senior level at the 2023 Master's de Patinage and the 2023 Cup of Nice, winning bronze and silver, respectively. Pitot would also compete at the 2023 CS Warsaw Cup, where he finished in fourth place.

At the Junior Grand Prix Final in Beijing, China, Pitot finished fifth. Days following the event, Pitot competed at the 2024 French Championships, where he won bronze for a second consecutive time. He would then go on to win gold at the junior level championships. He capped off his season with a fifth-place finish at the 2024 World Junior Figure Skating Championships.

=== 2024–25 season: Challenger Series bronze ===
Pitot began the season with an eleventh-place finish at the 2024 Lombardia Trophy. He then competed at the 2024 Master's de Patinage, where he won the gold medal. Making his debut on the 2024–25 Grand Prix circuit, Pitot finished eleventh at the 2024 Skate America. During the 2024 Grand Prix de France, Pitot had a hard fall on an attempted quad salchow in the short program, landing on his left shoulder and dislocating it. Pitot would go to see the French team's physiotherapist following his performance. Although his shoulder was swollen and it hurt to extend his arm, Pitot was medically cleared to compete in the free skate segment. He would finish the event in twelfth-place overall.

In December, Pitot won his first senior-level medal, a bronze at the 2024 Golden Spin of Zagreb. Two weeks following that event, he won the silver medal at the 2025 French Championships.

Pitot subsequently closed the season by winning gold at the 2025 Coupe du Printemps.

=== 2025–26 season: European Championships debut ===
Pitot opened his season by winning the silver medal at the 2025 Master's de Patinage. He followed up this result by finishing seventh at the ISU Skate to Milano.

Going on to compete on the 2025–26 Grand Prix circuit, Pitot placed fifth at the 2025 Grand Prix de France and eighth at the 2025 NHK Trophy.

In December, he placed ninth at the 2025 CS Golden Spin of Zagreb. Later that month, he finished fourth at the 2026 French Championships. Following the withdrawal of Adam Siao Him Fa, Pitot was selected to compete at the 2026 European Championships, where he finished in sixteenth place.

In March, Pitot completed his season at the 2026 World Championships. He placed twenty-first in the short program and nineteenth in the free skate, finishing twentieth overall.

=== 2026–27 season ===
Pitot begun the new season by winning the bronze medal at the 2026 CS Nebelhorn Trophy. Pitot later went onto finish seventh at the 2026 Grand Prix de France.

== Programs ==
| Season | Short program | Free skate | Exhibition | Ref. |
|---|---|---|---|---|
| 2019–20 | Sherlock Holmes; Discombobulate; Is It Poison, Nanny? By Hans Zimmer Choreo. by Brian Joubert | Time (from Inception) By Hans Zimmer Choreo. by Brian Joubert | | |
| 2021–22 | Senza parole By Il Divo Choreo. by Brian Joubert & Didier Lucine | Rocketman; Sorry Seems to Be the Hardest Word; I'm Still Standing By Elton John Performed by Taron Egerton Choreo. by Brian Joubert & Didier Lucine | | |
| 2022–23 | Medellín By Sofiane Pamart Choreo. by Angélique Abachkina | Romeo + Juliet; Talk Show Host By Radiohead; Kissing You By Des'ree; O Verona By Craig Armstrong Choreo. by Angélique Abachkina | | |
| 2023–24 | Separate Ways (Worlds Apart) (from Stranger Things) By Journey, Bryce Miller/Alloy Tracks Choreo. by Angélique Abachkina | Cry Me a River Performed by Michael Bublé Choreo. by Angélique Abachkina | | |
| 2024–25 | Libertango in Berlin By Astor Piazzolla Performed by Aydar Gainullin Choreo. by Angélique Abachkina | Clubbed to Death (from The Matrix) By Rob Dougan Performed by Maxence Cyrin; Sarajevo By Max Richter; Taught By Ros Stephen & Power Haus Choreo. by Angélique Abachkina | Separate Ways (Worlds Apart) (from Stranger Things) By Journey, Bryce Miller/Alloy Tracks Choreo. by Angélique Abachkina | |
| 2025–26 | Dig Down By Muse Arranged by Cédric Tour Choreo. by Benoît Richaud | The Beatles Medley; Let It Be Performed by JP Cooper; Get Back; While My Guitar Gently Weeps By The Beatles; Eleanor Rigby Performed by Cody Fry All arranged by Cédric Tour Choreo. by Benoît Richaud | Separate Ways (Worlds Apart) (from Stranger Things) By Journey, Bryce Miller/Alloy Tracks Choreo. by Angélique Abachkina | |
| 2026–27 | First Light by Hozier arranged by Cédric Tour | Goodbye Lenin (soundtrack) by Yann Thiersen arranged by Cédric Tour | The Grid by Daft Punk; Derezzed (Remixed by The Glitch Mob) by Daft Punk and The Glitch Mob | |

== Competitive highlights ==
- GP – Event of the ISU Grand Prix Series
- JGP – Event of the ISU Junior Grand Prix Series
- CS – Event of the ISU Challenger Series
- TBD – Assigned
- WD – Withdrew from competition

Competition placements at senior level
| Season | 2022–23 | 2023–24 | 2024–25 | 2025–26 | 2026-27 |
|---|---|---|---|---|---|
| World Championships | | | | 20th | |
| European Championships | | | | 16th | |
| French Championships | 3rd | 3rd | 2nd | 4th | |
| GP France | | | 12th | 5th | 7th |
| GP NHK Trophy | | | | 8th | TBD |
| GP Skate America | | | 11th | | |
| CS Ice Challenge | 5th | | | | |
| CS Golden Spin of Zagreb | | | 3rd | 9th | |
| CS Lombardia Trophy | | | 11th | | |
| CS Nebelhorn Trophy | | | | | 3rd |
| CS Tallinn Trophy | | | | | 9th |
| CS Warsaw Cup | | 4th | | | |
| Bellu Memorial | | | | 1st | |
| Coupe du Printemps | | | 1st | | |
| Master's de Patinage | | 3rd | 1st | 2nd | 2nd |
| Skate to Milano | | | | 7th | |
| Trophée Métropole Nice | | 2nd | | | |

Competition placements at junior level
| Season | 2018–19 | 2019–20 | 2020–21 | 2021–22 | 2022–23 | 2023–24 |
|---|---|---|---|---|---|---|
| Winter Youth Olympics | | 13th | | | | |
| World Junior Championships | | | | 30th | 12th | 5th |
| Junior Grand Prix Final | | | | | | 5th |
| French Championships (Senior) | | 8th | 5th | 6th | | |
| French Championships (Junior) | 12th | | | 2nd | | 1st |
| JGP France | | 12th | | 3rd | | |
| JGP Japan | | | | | | 1st |
| JGP Poland I | | | | | 6th | |
| JGP Poland II | | | | | 5th | |
| JGP Slovenia | | | | 6th | | |
| JGP Thailand | | | | | | 2nd |
| Bavarian Open | | | | 3rd | | |
| European Youth Olympic Festival | | | | 6th | | |
| Master's de Patinage | | 4th | 1st | 1st | | |
| Tallinn Trophy | | 1st | | | | |
| Triglav Trophy | 1st | | | | | |
| Trophée Métropole Nice | | | | 1st | 1st | |

== Detailed results ==
ISU personal best scores in the +5/-5 GOE System
| Segment | Type | Score | Event |
|---|---|---|---|
| Total | TSS | 233.98 | 2025 Grand Prix de France |
| Short program | TSS | 81.24 | 2025 Skate to Milano |
| Short program | TES | 44.62 | 2025 Skate to Milano |
| Short program | PCS | 37.99 | 2023 CS Warsaw Cup |
| Free skating | TSS | 155.72 | 2024 CS Golden Spin of Zagreb |
| Free skating | TES | 82.12 | 2024 CS Golden Spin of Zagreb |
| Free skating | PCS | 77.05 | 2025 NHK Trophy |

- Small medals for the short program and free skating are only awarded at ISU Championships.

=== Senior level ===
Results in the 2019–20 season
| Date | Event | SP | | FS | | Total | |
| Date | Event | P | Score | P | Score | P | Score |
|---|---|---|---|---|---|---|---|
| Dec 19–21, 2019 | (France) 2020 French Championships | 7 | 62.16 | 10 | 101.10 | 8 | 163.26 |

Results in the 2020–21 season
| Date | Event | SP | | FS | | Total | |
| Date | Event | P | Score | P | Score | P | Score |
|---|---|---|---|---|---|---|---|
| Feb 5–6, 2021 | (France) 2021 French Championships | 5 | 60.22 | 5 | 82.07 | 5 | 142.29 |

Results in the 2021–22 season
| Date | Event | SP | | FS | | Total | |
| Date | Event | P | Score | P | Score | P | Score |
|---|---|---|---|---|---|---|---|
| Dec 16–18, 2021 | (France) 2022 French Championships | 12 | 53.89 | 5 | 134.84 | 6 | 188.73 |

Results in the 2022–23 season
| Date | Event | SP | | FS | | Total | |
| Date | Event | P | Score | P | Score | P | Score |
|---|---|---|---|---|---|---|---|
| Nov 9–13, 2022 | (Austria) 2022 CS Ice Challenge | 15 | 59.05 | 1 | 153.20 | 5 | 212.25 |
| Dec 15–17, 2022 | (France) 2023 French Championships | 3 | 69.63 | 4 | 143.38 | 3 | 213.01 |

Results in the 2023–24 season
| Date | Event | SP | | FS | | Total | |
| Date | Event | P | Score | P | Score | P | Score |
|---|---|---|---|---|---|---|---|
| Sep 28–30, 2023 | (France) 2023 Master's de Patinage | 4 | 74.11 | 3 | 146.46 | 3 | 220.57 |
| Oct 18–22, 2023 | (France) 2023 Trophée Métropole Nice Côte d'Azur | 2 | 84.56 | 2 | 151.67 | 2 | 236.23 |
| Nov 16–19, 2023 | (Poland) 2023 CS Warsaw Cup | 3 | 78.55 | 7 | 132.81 | 4 | 211.36 |
| Dec 10–14, 2023 | (France) 2024 French Championships | 4 | 81.27 | 3 | 151.41 | 3 | 232.68 |

Results in the 2024–25 season
| Date | Event | SP | | FS | | Total | |
| Date | Event | P | Score | P | Score | P | Score |
|---|---|---|---|---|---|---|---|
| Sep 12–15, 2024 | (Italy) 2024 CS Lombardia Trophy | 13 | 62.93 | 11 | 128.40 | 11 | 191.33 |
| Sep 26–28, 2024 | (France) 2024 Master's de Patinage | 5 | 71.35 | 1 | 151.22 | 1 | 222.57 |
| Oct 18–20, 2024 | (United States) 2024 Skate America | 12 | 56.16 | 6 | 146.80 | 11 | 202.96 |
| Nov 1–3, 2024 | 2024 Grand Prix de France | 12 | 48.94 | 10 | 134.23 | 12 | 183.17 |
| Dec 4–7, 2024 | (Croatia) 2024 CS Golden Spin of Zagreb | 6 | 73.72 | 2 | 155.72 | 3 | 229.44 |
| Dec 20–21, 2024 | (France) 2025 French Championships | 2 | 75.44 | 2 | 155.82 | 2 | 231.26 |
| Mar 14–16, 2025 | (Luxembourg) Coupe du Printemps | 1 | 80.50 | 1 | 154.96 | 1 | 235.46 |

Results in the 2025–26 season
| Date | Event | SP | | FS | | Total | |
| Date | Event | P | Score | P | Score | P | Score |
|---|---|---|---|---|---|---|---|
| Aug 28–30, 2025 | (France) 2025 Master's de Patinage | 5 | 73.11 | 2 | 157.69 | 2 | 230.80 |
| Sep 18–21, 2025 | (China) 2025 Skate to Milano | 3 | 81.24 | 11 | 133.33 | 7 | 214.57 |
| Oct 17–19, 2025 | 2025 Grand Prix de France | 8 | 78.50 | 6 | 155.48 | 5 | 233.98 |
| Nov 7–9, 2025 | (Japan) 2025 NHK Trophy | 6 | 78.24 | 7 | 151.23 | 8 | 229.47 |
| Dec 3–6, 2025 | (Croatia) 2025 CS Golden Spin of Zagreb | 11 | 73.35 | 8 | 135.38 | 9 | 208.73 |
| Dec 18–20, 2025 | (France) 2026 French Championships | 4 | 77.77 | 3 | 148.01 | 4 | 225.78 |
| Jan 13–18, 2026 | (United Kingdom) 2026 European Championships | 13 | 73.09 | 21 | 124.78 | 16 | 197.87 |
| Feb 25 - Mar 1, 2026 | (Romania) 2026 Bellu Memorial | 3 | 66.40 | 1 | 152.27 | 1 | 218.67 |
| Mar 24–29, 2026 | (Czech Republic) 2026 World Championships | 21 | 74.61 | 19 | 144.14 | 20 | 218.75 |

Results in the 2026–27 season
| Date | Event | SP | | FS | | Total | |
| Date | Event | P | Score | P | Score | P | Score |
|---|---|---|---|---|---|---|---|
| Aug 27-29, 2026 | (France) 2026 Master's de Patinage | 2 | 60.31 | 1 | 140.98 | 2 | 201.29 |
| Sep 24–26, 2026 | (Germany) 2026 CS Nebelhorn Trophy | 7 | 75.28 | 3 | 148.91 | 3 | 224.19 |
| Oct 23-25, 2026 | 2026 Grand Prix de France | 6 | 79.46 | 7 | 141.77 | 7 | 221.23 |
| Nov 16–22, 2026 | (Estonia) 2026 CS Tallinn Trophy | 10 | 62.46 | 8 | 125.84 | 9 | 188.30 |

=== Junior level ===
Results in the 2018–19 season
| Date | Event | SP | | FS | | Total | |
| Date | Event | P | Score | P | Score | P | Score |
|---|---|---|---|---|---|---|---|
| Feb 22–24, 2019 | (France) 2019 French Championships (Junior) | 12 | 36.75 | 12 | 74.68 | 12 | 111.43 |
| Apr 10–14, 2019 | (Slovenia) 2019 Triglav Trophy | 1 | 42.28 | 1 | 68.43 | 1 | 110.71 |

Results in the 2019–20 season
| Date | Event | SP | | FS | | Total | |
| Date | Event | P | Score | P | Score | P | Score |
|---|---|---|---|---|---|---|---|
| Aug 21–24, 2019 | 2019 JGP France | 12 | 54.40 | 12 | 95.63 | 12 | 150.03 |
| Sep 26–28, 2019 | (France) 2019 Master's de Patinage | 8 | 40.37 | 2 | 95.97 | 4 | 136.34 |
| Nov 11–17, 2019 | (Estonia) 2019 Tallinn Trophy | 1 | 50.25 | 1 | 108.91 | 1 | 159.16 |
| Jan 10–15, 2020 | (Switzerland) 2020 Winter Youth Olympics | 11 | 53.02 | 12 | 101.02 | 13 | 154.04 |

Results in the 2020–21 season
| Date | Event | SP | | FS | | Total | |
| Date | Event | P | Score | P | Score | P | Score |
|---|---|---|---|---|---|---|---|
| Oct 1–3, 2020 | (France) 2020 Master's de Patinage | 3 | 47.90 | 1 | 108.87 | 1 | 156.77 |

Results in the 2021–22 season
| Date | Event | SP | | FS | | Total | |
| Date | Event | P | Score | P | Score | P | Score |
|---|---|---|---|---|---|---|---|
| Aug 18–21, 2021 | 2021 JGP France I | 4 | 61.27 | 3 | 120.99 | 3 | 182.26 |
| Oct 20–24, 2021 | (France) 2021 Trophée Métropole Nice Côte d'Azur | 3 | 55.09 | 1 | 111.73 | 1 | 166.82 |
| Sep 22–25, 2021 | 2021 JGP Slovenia | 7 | 59.12 | 5 | 125.25 | 6 | 184.37 |
| Sep 30 – Oct 2, 2021 | (France) 2021 Master's de Patinage | 1 | 65.12 | 1 | 141.36 | 1 | 206.48 |
| Dec 16–18, 2021 | (France) 2024 French Championships (Junior) | 1 | 68.19 | 2 | 109.69 | 2 | 177.88 |
| Jan 18–23, 2022 | (Germany) 2022 Bavarian Open | 2 | 74.33 | 4 | 111.05 | 3 | 185.38 |
| Mar 23–24, 2022 | (Finland) 2022 European Youth Olympic Winter Festival | 4 | 65.92 | 6 | 109.06 | 6 | 174.98 |
| Apr 13–17, 2022 | (Estonia) 2022 World Junior Championships | 30 | 48.98 | – | – | 30 | 48.98 |

Results in the 2022–23 season
| Date | Event | SP | | FS | | Total | |
| Date | Event | P | Score | P | Score | P | Score |
|---|---|---|---|---|---|---|---|
| Sep 28 – Oct 1, 2022 | 2022 JGP Poland I | 1 | 72.22 | 7 | 122.06 | 6 | 194.28 |
| Oct 5–8, 2022 | 2022 JGP Poland II | 5 | 71.33 | 7 | 119.29 | 5 | 190.62 |
| Oct 18–23, 2022 | (France) 2022 Trophée Métropole Nice Côte d'Azur | 1 | 75.03 | 1 | 115.95 | 1 | 190.98 |
| Feb 27 – Mar 5, 2023 | (Canada) 2023 World Junior Championships | 9 | 74.91 | 12 | 127.52 | 12 | 202.43 |

Results in the 2023–24 season
| Date | Event | SP | | FS | | Total | |
| Date | Event | P | Score | P | Score | P | Score |
|---|---|---|---|---|---|---|---|
| Aug 23–26, 2023 | 2023 JGP Thailand | 2 | 76.52 | 2 | 140.98 | 2 | 217.50 |
| Sep 13–16, 2023 | 2023 JGP Japan | 3 | 71.49 | 1 | 148.37 | 1 | 219.86 |
| Dec 7–10, 2023 | (China) 2023 Junior Grand Prix Final | 6 | 64.87 | 5 | 132.44 | 5 | 197.31 |
| Jan 12–14, 2024 | (France) 2024 French Championships (Junior) | 1 | 73.39 | 1 | 129.32 | 1 | 202.71 |
| Feb 26 – Mar 3, 2024 | (Taiwan) 2024 World Junior Championships | 2 | 78.79 | 7 | 136.16 | 5 | 214.95 |
