= Gwendoline Didier =

French figure skater

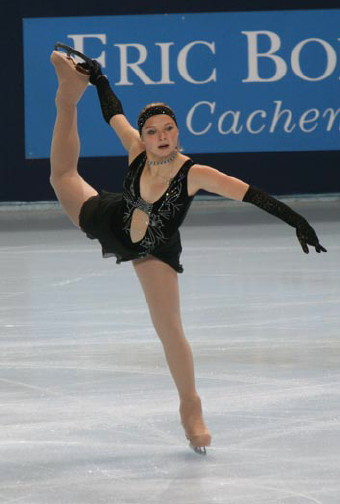
- Didier in 2008

Personal information
- Born: 3 October 1986 (age 40) Enghien-les-Bains
- Home town: Sannois
- Height: 1.59 m (5 ft 3 in)

Figure skating career
- Country: France
- Coach: Patrice Paillares
- Skating club: Club Olympique de Courbevoie
- Retired: 2010

Gwendoline Didier (born 3 October 1986 in Enghien-les-Bains, Val-d'Oise) is a French former competitive figure skater. She is the 2008 French national champion and the 2004 & 2010 national bronze medalist.

== Programs ==
Season	Short program	Free skating
2009–10	La Vie en rose by Édith Piaf, Louiguy; Milord by Édith Piaf, Marguerite Monnot	Singin' in the Rain by Nacio Herb Brown
2008–09	Paris-Texas by Ry Cooder; Spanish Caravan by The Doors; Tribute by Yanni	In the House by John Murphy; Organ Song by Archive; Requiem for a Dream by Clint Mansell
2007–08	Paris-Texas by Ry Cooder; Spanish Caravan by The Doors; Tribute by Yanni	Itinéraire d'un Enfant Gaté by Francis Lai; Death Theme (from The Untouchables) by Ennio Morricone; O Verona (from Romeo + Juliet) by Craig Armstrong
2003–04	Rattle and Burn; Rapture by Jesse Cook; Flamenco Bolero by Maurice Ravel	Taruka; Irna; Ibis (from Cirque du Soleil); Dead Bodies by Air
2002–03	Rattle and Burn; Rapture by Jesse Cook; Flamenco Bolero by Maurice Ravel	Sirius by The Alan Parsons Project; Woman in Chains by Tears for Fears; Lights of Heaven by Joe Satriani

== Competitive highlights ==
GP: Grand Prix; JGP: Junior Grand Prix

International
Event	02–03	03–04	04–05	05–06	06–07	07–08	08–09	09–10
Worlds								45th
Europeans						26th		
GP Bompard						8th	10th	9th
Crystal Skate								9th
Cup of Nice						5th	11th	10th
Nebelhorn Trophy								16th
Schäfer Memorial					7th			
Triglav Trophy							4th	
Universiade					15th		6th	
International: Junior
Junior Worlds		20th						
JGP Canada	10th							
JGP France			20th					
JGP Slovakia		8th						
JGP Slovenia		18th						
JGP Yugoslavia	13th							
Gardena	5th J							
National
French Champ.	7th	3rd	13th		7th	1st	4th	3rd
Masters							3rd	1st
Team events
World Team; Trophy							4th T 11th P	
J: Junior level; WD: Withdrew; T: Team result; P: Personal result. Medals awarded for team result only.
