= 2011 Trophée Éric Bompard =

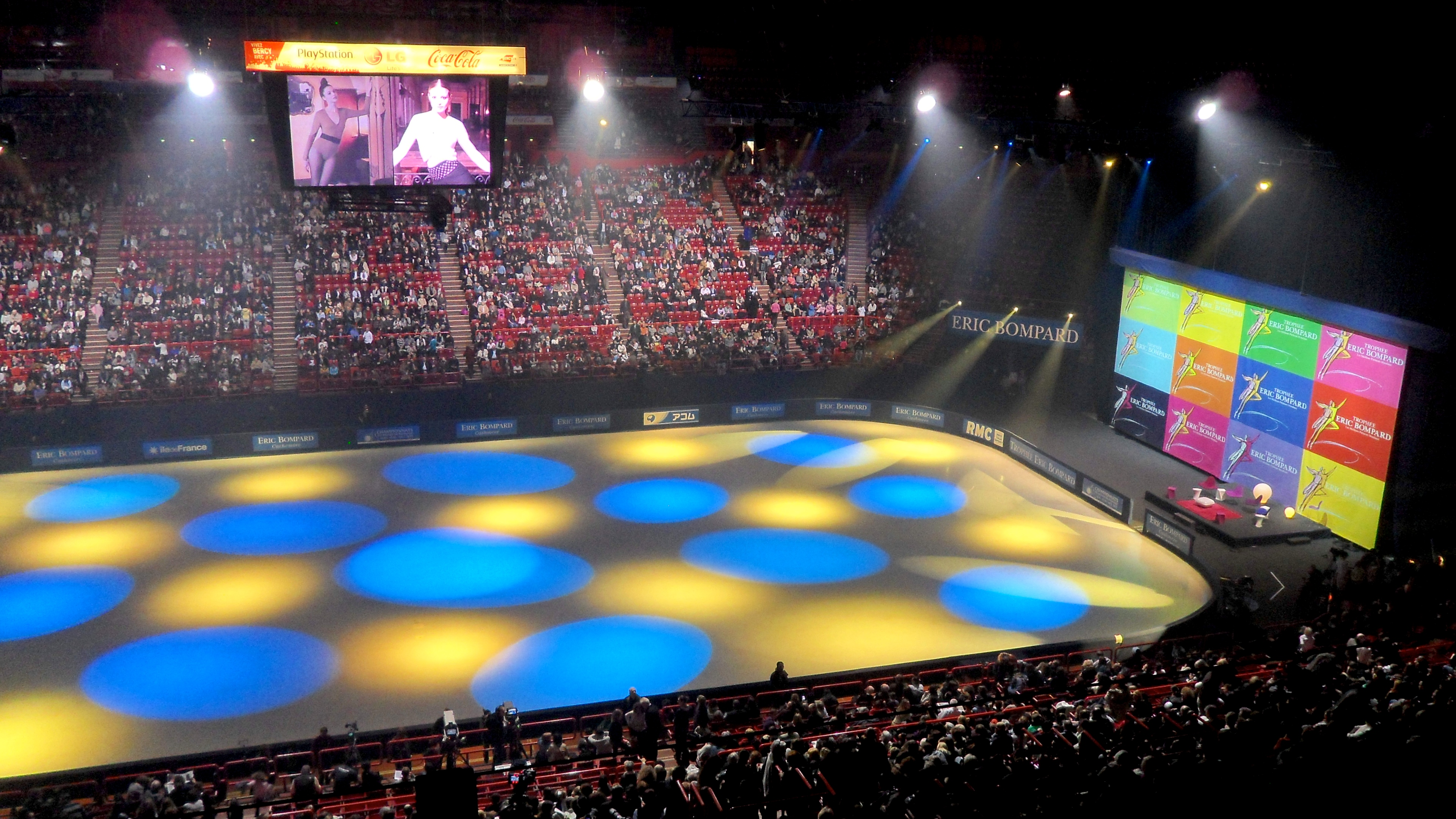
- Type: Grand Prix
- Date: November 17 – 20
- Season: 2011–12
- Location: Paris
- Host: Federation Française des Sports de Glace
- Venue: Palais Omnisports de Paris-Bercy

Champions
- Men's singles: (Canada) Patrick Chan
- Ladies' singles: (Russia) Elizaveta Tuktamysheva
- Pairs: (Russia) Tatiana Volosozhar / Maxim Trankov
- Ice dance: (Canada) Tessa Virtue / Scott Moir
- Previous: 2010 Trophée Éric Bompard
- Next: 2012 Trophée Éric Bompard
- Previous Grand Prix: 2011 NHK Trophy
- Next Grand Prix: 2011 Cup of Russia

The 2011 Trophée Éric Bompard was the fifth event of six in the 2011–12 ISU Grand Prix of Figure Skating, a senior-level international invitational competition series. It was held at the Palais Omnisports de Paris-Bercy in Paris on November 17–20. Medals were awarded in the disciplines of men's singles, ladies' singles, pair skating, and ice dancing. Skaters earned points toward qualifying for the 2011–12 Grand Prix Final.

== Eligibility ==
Skaters who reached the age of 14 by July 1, 2011 were eligible to compete on the senior Grand Prix circuit.

In July 2011, minimum score requirements were added to the Grand Prix series and were set at two-thirds of the top scores at the 2011 World Championships. Prior to competing in a Grand Prix event, skaters were required to earn the following:

Discipline	Minimum
Men	168.60
Ladies	117.48
Pairs	130.71
Ice dancing	111.15

== Entries ==
The entries were as follows. Brian Joubert withdrew due to injury and was replaced by Romain Ponsart.

Country	Men	Ladies	Pairs	Ice dancing
Canada	Patrick Chan; Kevin Reynolds		Meagan Duhamel / Eric Radford; Jessica Dubé / Sébastien Wolfe	Tessa Virtue / Scott Moir
China	Song Nan		Dong Huibo / Wu Yiming	Huang Xintong / Zheng Xun
Czech Republic	Michal Březina			
France	Florent Amodio; Chafik Besseghier; Romain Ponsart	Yretha Silete; Léna Marrocco; Maé Bérénice Méité	Vanessa James / Morgan Cipres	Nathalie Péchalat / Fabian Bourzat
Italy		Carolina Kostner		Anna Cappellini / Luca Lanotte
Japan	Nobunari Oda	Kanako Murakami		
Russia		Elizaveta Tuktamysheva	Vera Bazarova / Yuri Larionov; Ksenia Stolbova / Fedor Klimov; Tatiana Volosozhar / Maxim Trankov	Kristina Gorshkova / Vitali Butikov; Elena Ilinykh / Nikita Katsalapov
Spain		Sonia Lafuente		Sara Hurtado / Adrià Díaz
Sweden	Alexander Majorov	Viktoria Helgesson		
United States	Adam Rippon	Alissa Czisny	Amanda Evora / Mark Ladwig	Madison Chock / Evan Bates

== Results ==
=== Men ===
Rank	Name	Nation	Total points	SP		FS	
1	Patrick Chan	Canada	240.60	1	84.16	1	156.44
2	Song Nan	China	224.10	2	76.53	2	147.57
3	Michal Březina	Czech Republic	218.60	3	74.32	4	144.28
4	Adam Rippon	United States	217.89	4	72.96	3	144.93
5	Florent Amodio	France	201.34	5	71.42	5	129.92
6	Alexander Majorov	Sweden	190.60	8	62.12	6	128.48
7	Nobunari Oda	Japan	167.20	7	62.95	9	104.25
8	Romain Ponsart	France	160.45	9	50.03	8	110.42
9	Chafik Besseghier	France	160.39	10	46.43	7	113.96
WD	Kevin Reynolds	Canada		6	65.56		

=== Ladies ===
Rank	Name	Nation	Total points	SP		FS	
1	Elizaveta Tuktamysheva	Russia	182.89	1	62.04	2	120.85
2	Carolina Kostner	Italy	179.32	2	59.70	3	119.62
3	Alissa Czisny	United States	179.15	3	57.25	1	121.90
4	Kanako Murakami	Japan	161.31	4	55.77	4	105.54
5	Viktoria Helgesson	Sweden	154.90	5	54.16	5	100.74
6	Maé Bérénice Méité	France	145.44	6	50.49	6	94.95
7	Sonia Lafuente	Spain	136.32	7	49.51	8	86.81
8	Yrétha Silété	France	135.90	8	48.25	7	87.65
9	Lena Marrocco	France	126.97	9	43.95	9	83.02

=== Pairs ===
Rank	Name	Nation	Total points	SP		FS	
1	Tatiana Volosozhar / Maxim Trankov	Russia	194.13	1	63.69	1	130.44
2	Vera Bazarova / Yuri Larionov	Russia	184.91	3	59.06	2	125.85
3	Meagan Duhamel / Eric Radford	Canada	176.62	2	61.06	3	115.56
4	Amanda Evora / Mark Ladwig	United States	169.58	4	57.69	4	111.89
5	Jessica Dubé / Sébastien Wolfe	Canada	150.68	5	53.24	6	97.44
6	Dong Huibo / Wu Yiming	China	147.75	6	49.27	5	98.48
7	Ksenia Stolbova / Fedor Klimov	Russia	137.06	7	48.81	8	88.25
8	Vanessa James / Morgan Cipres	France	133.31	8	44.86	7	88.45

=== Ice dancing ===
Rank	Name	Nation	Total points	SD		FD	
1	Tessa Virtue / Scott Moir	Canada	176.93	1	71.18	1	105.75
2	Nathalie Péchalat / Fabian Bourzat	France	164.56	2	66.52	2	98.04
3	Anna Cappellini / Luca Lanotte	Italy	153.76	3	64.62	3	89.14
4	Elena Ilinykh / Nikita Katsalapov	Russia	140.32	4	58.17	4	82.15
5	Madison Chock / Evan Bates	United States	130.94	5	52.01	5	78.93
6	Huang Xintong / Zheng Xun	China	126.69	6	50.71	6	75.98
7	Kristina Gorshkova / Vitali Butikov	Russia	118.48	7	48.77	7	69.71
8	Sara Hurtado / Adrià Díaz	Spain	103.75	8	45.71	8	58.04
