= Master's de Patinage =

French annual figure skating competition

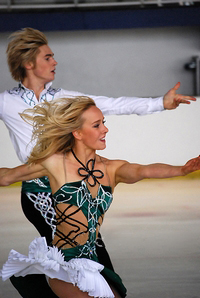
Pernelle Carron and Lloyd Jones at the 2009 Master's de Patinage.

The Master's de Patinage is an annual domestic French figure skating competition held in the autumn. Skaters compete in men's singles, women's singles, pair skating, and ice dance at the senior and junior levels.

== Senior medalists ==
=== Men’s singles ===
Year	Location	Gold	Silver	Bronze	Ref.
2008	Orléans	Alban Préaubert	Brian Joubert	Yannick Ponsero	
2009	Orléans	Florent Amodio	Brian Joubert	Alban Préaubert	
2010	Orléans	Brian Joubert	Florent Amodio	Alban Préaubert	
2011	Orléans	Florent Amodio	Brian Joubert	Chafik Besseghier	
2012	Orléans	Florent Amodio	Brian Joubert	Chafik Besseghier	
2013	Orléans	Florent Amodio	Florian Lejeune	Romain Ponsart	
2014	Orléans	Chafik Besseghier	Florent Amodio	Romain Ponsart	
2015	Orléans	Romain Ponsart	Simon Hocquaux	Florent Amodio	
2016	Villard-de-Lans	Chafik Besseghier	Philip Warren	Adrien Tesson	
2017	Villard-de-Lans	Romain Ponsart	Adrien Tesson	Philip Warren	
2018	Villard-de-Lans	Kévin Aymoz	Luc Economides	Adrien Tesson	
2019	Villard-de-Lans	Kévin Aymoz	Adrien Tesson	Luc Economides	
2020	Villard-de-Lans	Kévin Aymoz	Landry Le May	(Australia) Brendan Kerry	
2021	Épinal	Adam Siao Him Fa	Luc Economides	Kévin Aymoz	
2022	Villard-de-Lans	Adam Siao Him Fa	Landry Le May	Luc Economides	
2023	Villard-de-Lans	Adam Siao Him Fa	Kévin Aymoz	François Pitot	
2024	Villard-de-Lans	François Pitot	Luc Economides	Corentin Spinar	
2025	Villard-de-Lans	Kévin Aymoz	François Pitot	Adam Siao Him Fa	
2026	Louviers	Adam Siao Him Fa	François Pitot	Sammy Hammi	

=== Women’s singles ===
Year	Location	Gold	Silver	Bronze	Ref.
2008	Orléans	Candice Didier	Maé-Bérénice Méité	Gwendoline Didier	
2009	Orléans	Gwendoline Didier	Vincianne Fortin	No other competitors	
2010	Orléans	Candice Didier	Maé-Bérénice Méité	Léna Marrocco	
2011	Orléans	Maé-Bérénice Méité	Lénaëlle Gilleron-Gorry	Yrétha Silété	
2012	Orléans	Lénaëlle Gilleron-Gorry	Maé-Bérénice Méité	Léna Marrocco	
2013	Orléans	Maé-Bérénice Méité	Candice Didier	Lénaëlle Gilleron-Gorry	
2014	Orléans	Maé-Bérénice Méité	Laurine Lecavelier	Anaïs Ventard	
2015	Orléans	Laurine Lecavelier	No other competitors		
2016	Villard-de-Lans	Maé-Bérénice Méité	Laurine Lecavelier	Léa Serna	
2017	Villard-de-Lans	Maé-Bérénice Méité	Laurine Lecavelier	Léa Serna	
2018	Villard-de-Lans	Laurine Lecavelier	Maé-Bérénice Méité	Léa Serna	
2019	Villard-de-Lans	Laurine Lecavelier	Maé-Bérénice Méité	Léa Serna	
2020	Villard-de-Lans	Lea Serna	Alizée Crozet	Julie Froetscher	
2021	Épinal	Maïa Mazzara	Léa Serna	Julie Froetscher	
2022	Villard-de-Lans	Lorine Schild	Léa Serna	Maïa Mazzara	
2023	Villard-de-Lans	Léa Serna	Lorine Schild	Maïa Mazzara	
2024	Villard-de-Lans	Lorine Schild	Clémence Mayindu	Sophia Maarouf	
2025	Villard-de-Lans	Lorine Schild	Léa Serna	(Belgium) Jade Hovine	
2026	Louviers	Eve Dubecq	Ines Belot	No other competitors	

=== Pairs ===
Year	Location	Gold	Silver	Bronze	Ref.
2008	Orléans	Adeline Canac; Maximin Coia	Vanessa James; Yannick Bonheur	Camille Foucher; Bruno Massot	
2009	Orléans	Vanessa James; Yannick Bonheur	Adeline Canac; Maximin Coia	Melodie Chataignier; Medhi Bouzzine	
2010	Orléans	Adeline Canac; Yannick Bonheur	Melodie Chataignier; Medhi Bouzzine	Anne Laure Letscher; Bruno Massot	
2011	Orléans	Vanessa James; Morgan Ciprès	Daria Popova; Bruno Massot	Anne Laure Letscher; Artem Patlasov	
2012	Orléans	Vanessa James; Morgan Ciprès	Daria Popova; Bruno Massot	No other competitors	
2013	Orléans	Daria Popova; Bruno Massot	Vanessa James; Morgan Ciprès	No other competitors	
2014	Orléans	Vanessa James; Morgan Ciprès	Daria Popova; Andrei Novoselov	No other competitors	
2015	Orléans	Vanessa James; Morgan Ciprès	Camille Mendoza; Pavel Kovalev	No other competitors	
2016	Villard-de-Lans	Camille Mendoza; Pavel Kovalev	No other competitors		
2017	Villard-de-Lans	Vanessa James; Morgan Ciprès	Lola Esbrat; Andrei Novoselov	Camille Mendoza; Pavel Kovalev	
2018	Villard-de-Lans	Vanessa James; Morgan Ciprès	Camille Mendoza; Pavel Kovalev	No other competitors	
2019	Villard-de-Lans	Camille Mendoza; Pavel Kovalev	No other competitors		
2020	Villard-de-Lans	Cleo Hamon; Denys Strekalin	Coline Keriven; Noël-Antoine Pierre	Camille Kovalev; Pavel Kovalev	
2021	Épinal	Coline Keriven; Noël-Antoine Pierre	No other competitors		
2022	Villard-de-Lans	Camille Kovalev; Pavel Kovalev	Océane Piegad; Denys Strekalin	Aurélie Faula; Théo Belle	
2023	Villard-de-Lans	Camille Kovalev; Pavel Kovalev	Aurélie Faula; Théo Belle	Oxana Vouillamoz; Flavien Giniaux	
2024	Villard-de-Lans	Aurélie Faula; Théo Belle	Camille Kovalev; Pavel Kovalev	No other competitors	
2025	Villard-de-Lans	Camille Kovalev; Pavel Kovalev	Aurélie Faula; Théo Belle	Megan Wessenberg; Denys Strekalin	
2026	Louviers	Camille Kovalev; Pavel Kovalev	Aurélie Faula; Théo Belle	Louise Ehrhard; Matthis Pellegris	

=== Ice dance ===
Year	Location	Gold	Silver	Bronze	Ref.
2008	Orléans	Isabelle Delobel; Olivier Schoenfelder	Nathalie Péchalat; Fabian Bourzat	Pernelle Carron; Mathieu Jost	
2009	Orléans	Nathalie Péchalat; Fabian Bourzat	Zoe Blanc; Pierre-Loup Bouquet	Pernelle Carron; Lloyd Jones	
2010	Orléans	Nathalie Péchalat; Fabian Bourzat	Pernelle Carron; Lloyd Jones	Zoe Blanc; Pierre-Loup Bouquet	
2011	Orléans	Nathalie Péchalat; Fabian Bourzat	Charlène Denize; Quentin Langlois	Harmonie Lafont; Stanislas Etzol	
2012	Orléans	Nathalie Péchalat; Fabian Bourzat	Pernelle Carron; Lloyd Jones	No other competitors	
2013	Orléans	Nathalie Péchalat; Fabian Bourzat	Pernelle Carron; Lloyd Jones	Gabriella Papadakis; Guillaume Cizeron	
2014	Orléans	Gabriella Papadakis; Guillaume Cizeron	Marie-Jade Lauriault; Romain Le Gac	Lorenza Alessandrini; Pierre Souquet	
2015	Orléans	Lorenza Alessandrini; Pierre Souquet	Laureline Aubry; Kevin Bellingard	Mathilde Dias; Jean Denis Sanchis	
2016	Villard-de-Lans	Gabriella Papadakis; Guillaume Cizeron	Marie-Jade Lauriault; Romain Le Gac	Lorenza Alessandrini; Pierre Souquet	
2017	Villard-de-Lans	Gabriella Papadakis; Guillaume Cizeron	Marie-Jade Lauriault; Romain Le Gac	Angélique Abachkina; Louis Thauron	
2018	Villard-de-Lans	Marie-Jade Lauriault; Romain Le Gac	Adelina Galyavieva; Louis Thauron	Julia Wagret; Pierre Souquet	
2019	Villard-de-Lans	Gabriella Papadakis; Guillaume Cizeron	Marie-Jade Lauriault; Romain Le Gac	Adelina Galyavieva; Louis Thauron	
2020	Villard-de-Lans	Evgeniia Lopareva; Geoffrey Brissaud	Natacha Lagouge; Arnaud Caffa	No other competitors	
2021	Épinal	Gabriella Papadakis; Guillaume Cizeron	Evgeniia Lopareva; Geoffrey Brissaud	Marie Dupayage; Thomas Nabais	
2022	Villard-de-Lans	Evgeniia Lopareva; Geoffrey Brissaud	Loïcia Demougeot; Théo le Mercier	Natacha Lagouge; Arnaud Caffa	
2023	Villard-de-Lans	Evgeniia Lopareva; Geoffrey Brissaud	Marie Dupayage; Thomas Nabais	Natacha Lagouge; Arnaud Caffa	
2024	Villard-de-Lans	Evgeniia Lopareva; Geoffrey Brissaud	Marie Dupayage; Thomas Nabais	Loïcia Demougeot; Théo le Mercier	
2025	Villard-de-Lans	Laurence Fournier Beaudry; Guillaume Cizeron	Evgeniia Lopareva; Geoffrey Brissaud	Loïcia Demougeot; Théo le Mercier	
2026	Louviers	Evgeniia Lopareva; Geoffrey Brissaud	Loïcia Demougeot; Théo le Mercier	Natacha Lagouge; Arnaud Caffa	

== Junior medalists ==
=== Men’s singles ===
Year	Location	Gold	Silver	Bronze	Ref.
2008	Orléans	Florent Amodio	Morgan Ciprès	Christopher Boyadji	
2009	Orléans	Romain Ponsart	Morgan Ciprès	Thomas Sosniak	
2010	Orléans	Thomas Sosniak	Romain Ponsart	Charles Tetar	
2011	Orléans	Charles Tetar	Thomas Sosniak	Maxime Petraru	
2012	Orléans	Charles Tetar	Simon Hocquaux	Noël-Antoine Pierre	
2013	Orléans	Simon Hocquaux	Adrien Tesson	Charles Tetar	
2014	Orléans	Simon Hocquaux	Kévin Aymoz	Adrien Tesson	
2015	Orléans	Kévin Aymoz	Adrien Tesson	Luc Economides	
2016	Villard-de-Lans	Landry Le May	Luc Economides	Adam Siao Him Fa	
2017	Villard-de-Lans	Luc Economides	Maxence Collet	Lotfi Sereir	
2018	Villard-de-Lans	Adam Siao Him Fa	Xavier Vauclin	Landry Le May	
2019	Villard-de-Lans	Tom Bouvart	Samy Hammi	Yann Frechon	
2020	Villard-de-Lans	François Pitot	Ian Vauclin	Samy Hammi	
2021	Épinal	François Pitot	Ian Vauclin	Axel Ahmed	
2022	Villard-de-Lans	Ian Vauclin	Ilia Gogitidze	Jean Medard	
2023	Villard-de-Lans	Jean Medard	Ilia Gogitidze	Gianni Motilla	
2024	Villard-de-Lans	Gianni Motilla	Ilia Gogitidze	Jean Medard	

=== Women’s singles ===
Year	Location	Gold	Silver	Bronze	Ref.
2008	Orléans	Vincianne Fortin	Léna Marrocco	Yrétha Silété	
2009	Orléans	Maé Bérénice Méité	Léna Marrocco	Yrétha Silété	
2010	Orléans	Yrétha Silété	Anaïs Ventard	Lénaëlle Gilleron-Gorry	
2011	Orléans	Anaïs Ventard	Aline Zerourou	Flora Leblanc	
2012	Orléans	Laurine Lecavelier	Nadjma Mahamoud	Carla Monzali	
2013	Orléans	Laurine Lecavelier	Léna Marrocco	Léa Serna	
2014	Orléans	Léa Serna	Alizée Crozet	Pauline Wanner	
2015	Orléans	Pauline Wanner	Julie Frötscher	Alizée Crozet	
2016	Villard-de-Lans	Julie Frötscher	Alizée Crozet	Nadjma Mahamoud	
2017	Villard-de-Lans	Pauline Wanner	Heloise Pitot	Oceane Piegad	
2018	Villard-de-Lans	Anna Kuzmenko	Alizée Crozet	Lola Ghozali	
2019	Villard-de-Lans	Maïa Mazzara	Oceane Piegad	Lola Ghozali	
2020	Villard-de-Lans	Sophie Sprung	Lorine Schild	Lola Ghozali	
2021	Épinal	Lorine Schild	Lola Ghozali	Eve Dubecq	
2022	Villard-de-Lans	Lola Ghozali	Stefania Gladki	Eve Dubecq	
2023	Villard-de-Lans	Stefania Gladki	Ninon Dapoigny	Eve Dubecq	
2024	Villard-de-Lans	Stefania Gladki	Eve Dubecq	Mila Bertsch	
2026	Louviers	Shylina Renaud	Louanne Wolff	Mila Bertsch	

=== Pairs ===
Year	Location	Gold	Silver	Bronze	Ref.
2008	Orléans	Anne Laure Letscher; Rudy Halmaert	No other competitors		
2009	Orléans	Camille Foucher; Bruno Massot	No other competitors		
2010	Orléans	Marie Diamoneka; Artem Patlasov	No other competitors		
2011	Orléans	Camille Mendoza; Christopher Boyadji	No other competitors		
2017	Villard-de-Lans	Cléo Hamon; Denys Strekalin	No other competitors		
2018	Villard-de-Lans	Liudmila Molchanova; Remi Belmonte	No other competitors		
2019	Villard-de-Lans	Liudmila Molchanova; Remi Belmonte	No other competitors		
2021	Épinal	Oxana Vouillamoz; Flavien Giniaux	Louise Ehrhard; Matthis Pellegris	No other competitors	
2022	Villard-de-Lans	Oxana Vouillamoz; Flavien Giniaux	Louise Ehrhard; Matthis Pellegris	No other competitors	
2023	Villard-de-Lans	Romane Télémaque; Lucas Coulon	No other competitors		
2024	Villard-de-Lans	Romane Télémaque; Lucas Coulon	Louise Ehrhard; Matthis Pellegris	Clelia Liget-Latus; Allan Daniel Fisher	

=== Ice dance ===
Year	Location	Gold	Silver	Bronze	Ref.
2008	Orléans	Charlène Guignard; Guillaume Paulmier	Rowan Musson; Neil Brown	Charlène Denize; Quentin Langlois	
2009	Orléans	Sofia Gassoumi; Arnaud Pasztory	Aéla Royer; Benjamin Leze	Géraldine Bott; Neil Brown	
2010	Orléans	Gabriella Papadakis; Guillaume Cizeron	Géraldine Bott; Neil Brown	Tiffany Zahorski; Alexis Miart	
2011	Orléans	Gabriella Papadakis; Guillaume Cizeron	Elektra Hetman; Benjamin Allain	Myriam Gassoumi; Clément Le Molaire	
2012	Orléans	Gabriella Papadakis; Guillaume Cizeron	Estelle Elizabeth; Romain Le Gac	Magali Leininger; Maxime Caurel	
2013	Orléans	Estelle Elizabeth; Romain Le Gac	Angélique Abachkina; Louis Thauron	Myriam Gassoumi; Clément Le Molaire	
2014	Orléans	Angélique Abachkina; Louis Thauron	Sarah-Marine Rouffanche; Geoffrey Brissaud	Hana Gassoumi; Corentin Rahier	
2015	Orléans	Marie-Jade Lauriault; Romain Le Gac	Adelina Galyavieva; Laurent Abecassis	Sarah-Marine Rouffanche; Geoffrey Brissaud	
2016	Villard-de-Lans	Angélique Abachkina; Louis Thauron	Natacha Lagouge; Corentin Rahier	Julia Wagret; Mathieu Couyras	
2017	Villard-de-Lans	Loïcia Demougeot; Théo le Mercier	Mathilde Viard; Renan Manceaux	Marie Dupayage; Thomas Nabais	
2018	Villard-de-Lans	Loïcia Demougeot; Théo le Mercier	Evgeniia Lopareva; Geoffrey Brissaud	Lou Terreaux; Noe Perron	
2019	Villard-de-Lans	Loïcia Demougeot; Théo le Mercier	Marie Dupayage; Thomas Nabais	Lou Terreaux; Noe Perron	
2020	Villard-de-Lans	Loïcia Demougeot; Théo le Mercier	Marie Dupayage; Thomas Nabais	Lou Terreaux; Noe Perron	
2021	Épinal	Eve Bernard; Tom Jochum	Célina Fradji; Jean-Hans Fourneaux	Lila-Maya Seclet-Monchot; Martin Chardain	
2022	Villard-de-Lans	Célina Fradji; Jean-Hans Fourneaux	Ambre Perrier Gianesini; Samuel Blanc Klaperman	Louise Bordet; Thomas Gipoulou	
2023	Villard-de-Lans	Célina Fradji; Jean-Hans Fourneaux	Ambre Perrier Gianesini; Samuel Blanc Klaperman	Dania Mouaden; Theo Bigot	
2024	Villard-de-Lans	Célina Fradji; Jean-Hans Fourneaux	Ambre Perrier Gianesini; Samuel Blanc Klaperman	Eva Bernard; Amedeo Bonetto	
2025	Villard-de-Lans	Laurence_Fournier_Beaudry; Guillaume Cizeron	Evgeniia Lopareva; Geoffrey Brissaud	Loïcia Demougeot; Théo le Mercier	
