= Lénaëlle Gilleron-Gorry =

French figure skater

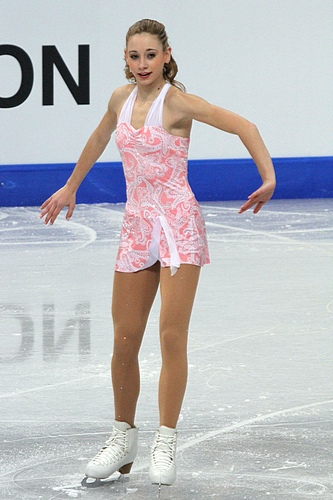
- Gilleron-Gorry in 2012

Personal information
- Born: 23 April 1995 (age 31) Athis-Mons, France
- Height: 1.65 m (5 ft 5 in)

Figure skating career
- Country: France
- Coach: Didier Lucine, Claudine Lucine, S. Golaz, A. Berthet
- Skating club: Annecy SC
- Began skating: 2005

Lénaëlle Gilleron-Gorry (born 23 April 1995) is a French figure skater. She is the 2011 Merano Cup silver medalist, the 2012 Triglav Trophy bronze medalist, and placed 11th at the 2013 European Championships.

== Programs ==
Season	Short program	Free skating
2012–2013	Tristan & Iseult by Maxime Rodriguez	Memoirs of a Geisha by John Williams
2011–2012	Scène d'amour by Francis Lai performed by Sarah Brightman; Chicago	Memoirs of a Geisha by John Williams

== Competitive highlights ==
GP: Grand Prix; JGP: Junior Grand Prix

International
Event	2009–10	2010–11	2011–12	2012–13	2013–14	2014–15
Europeans				11th		
GP Bompard					WD	
Cup of Nice			7th	7th	17th	
Merano Cup		8th	2nd	9th		
Triglav Trophy			3rd			
International: Junior
Junior Worlds			27th			
JGP Austria		14th				
JGP France		7th				
JGP Germany				8th		
JGP Latvia			8th			
JGP Romania			8th			
JGP Turkey				9th		
EYOF		4th				
Cup of Nice	19th J.	2nd J.				
National
French Champ.	13th	2nd	5th	4th	4th	
Masters		3rd J	2nd	1st	3rd	WD
Team events
World Team; Trophy				6th T (12th P)		
J. = Junior level; WD = Withdrew; T = Team result; P = Personal result; Medals awarded for team result only.
