= Loïcia Demougeot =

French ice dancer (born 2002)

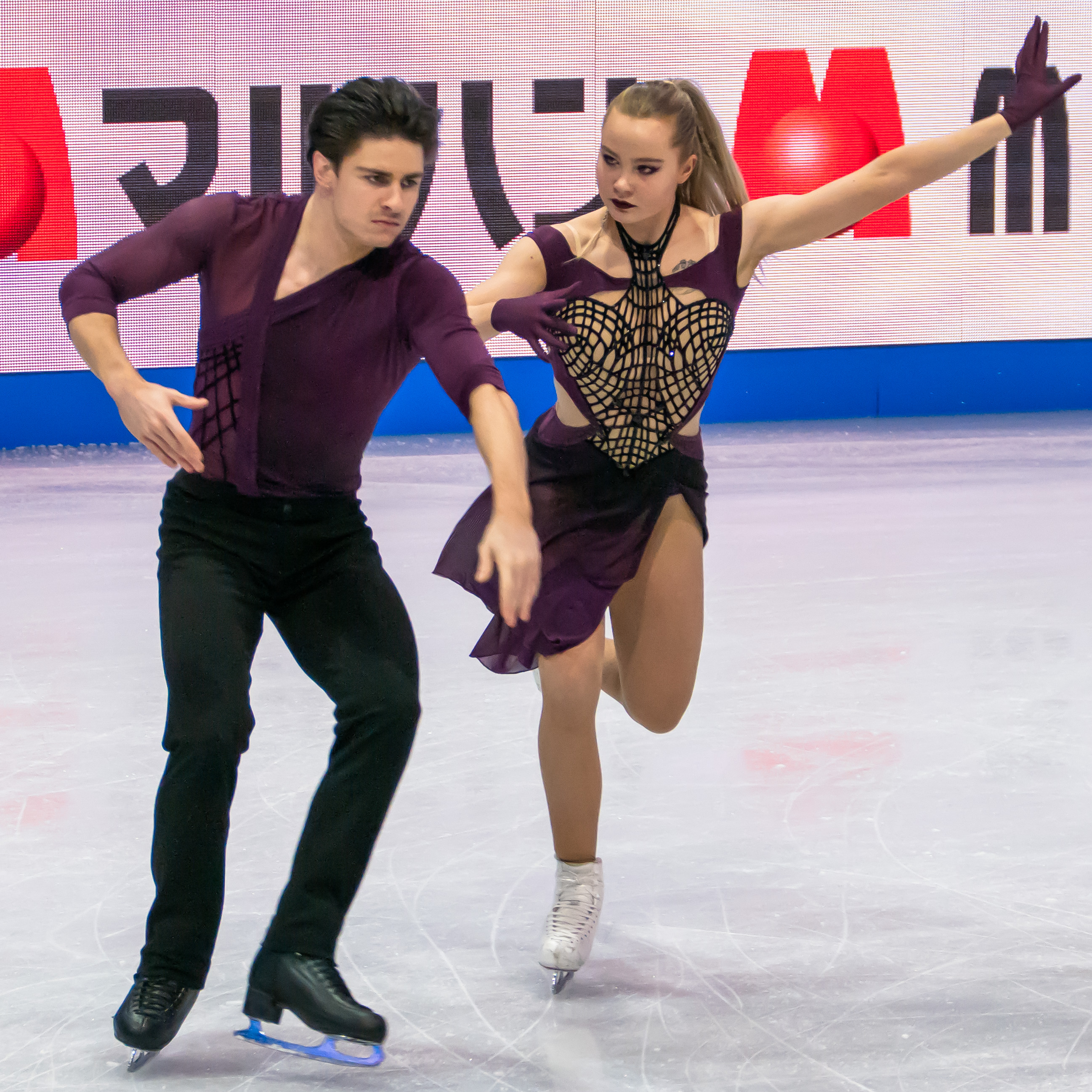
- Loïcia Demougeot and Théo le Mercier performing their free dance at the 2025 World Championships

Personal information
- Born: 31 January 2002 (age 24) Belfort, France
- Home town: Villard-de-Lans
- Height: 1.72 m (5 ft 7 1/2 in)

Figure skating career
- Country: France
- Discipline: Ice dance
- Partner: Théo le Mercier
- Coach: Karine Arribert-Narce; Mahil Chantelauze; Tiffany Zahorski
- Skating club: Villard-de-Lans Skating Club
- Began skating: 2008

Medal record
French Championships
Silver medal – second place	2023 Rouen	Ice dance
Silver medal – second place	2024 Vaujany	Ice dance
Silver medal – second place	2025 Annecy	Ice dance
Bronze medal – third place	2022 Cergy-Pontoise	Ice dance
Bronze medal – third place	2026 Briancon	Ice dance

Loïcia Demougeot (born 31 January 2002) is a French ice dancer. With her skating partner, Théo le Mercier, she is a four-time Challenger Series medalist (including gold at the 2023 CS Warsaw Cup) and five-time French national medalist.

Earlier in their career, Demougeot/Le Mercier twice finished with in the top eight at the World Junior Championships (2019; 2020), were two-time silver medalists on the ISU Junior Grand Prix series, and two-tme French junior national champions (2019-20).

== Career ==
=== Early years ===
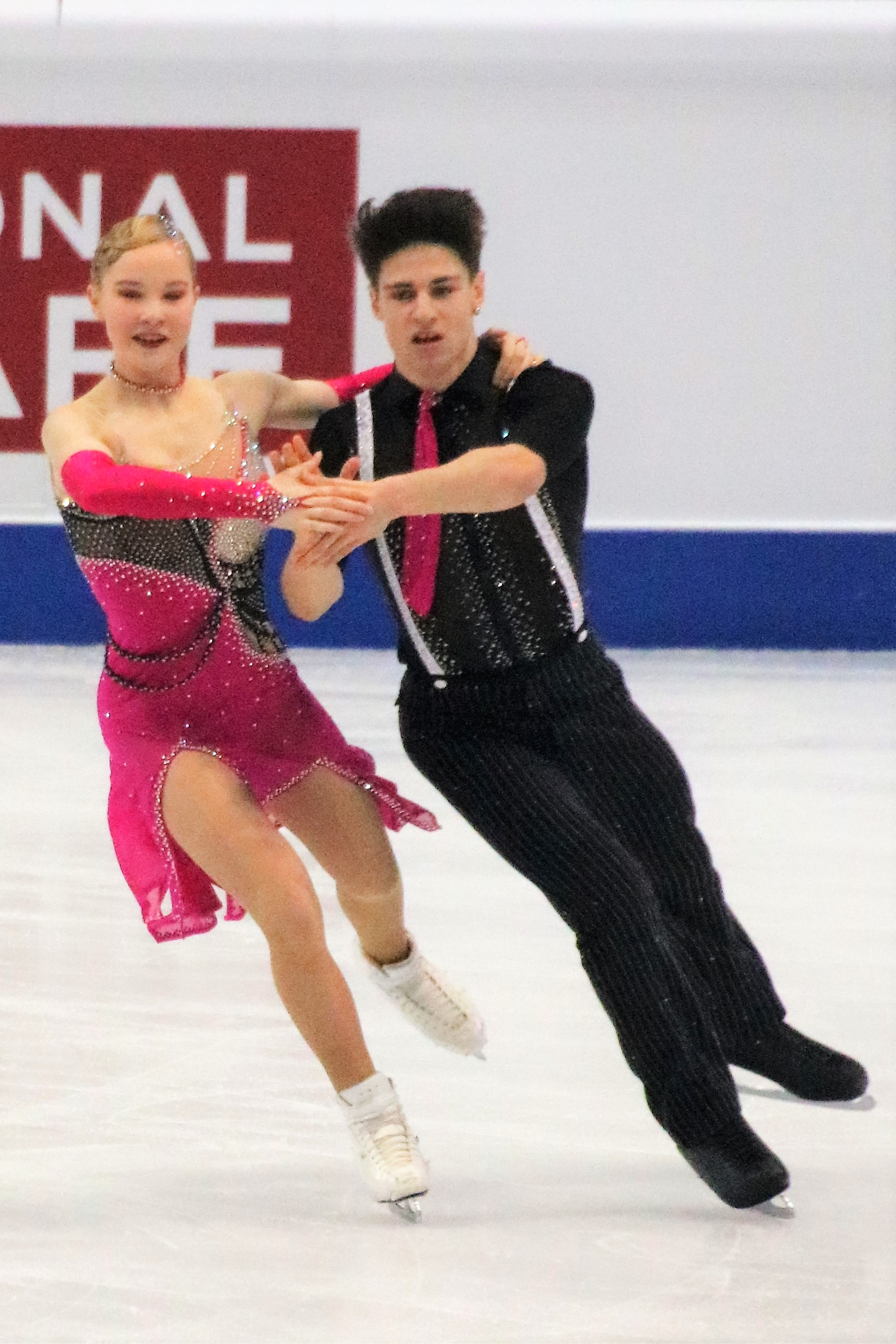
Demougeot/Le Mercier at the 2019–20 Junior Grand Prix Final

Demougeot began learning to skate in 2008. She teamed up with Théo le Mercier in 2015.The two made their international debut in February 2016 at the Bavarian Open. They debuted on the Junior Grand Prix series in August of the same year.

Demougeot/Le Mercier qualified to the final segment at the 2018 World Junior Championships in Sofia, Bulgaria. They ranked fourteenth in the short dance, fifteenth in the free dance, and fifteenth overall.

In February 2019, they won the French junior national title for the first time. They placed seventh in the rhythm dance, ninth in the free dance, and eighth overall at the 2019 World Junior Championships in Zagreb, Croatia.

Beginning the 2019–20 season on the Junior Grand Prix, Demougeot/Le Mercier won silver medals at both the JGP France and the JGP Croatia, qualifying for the first time to the Junior Grand Prix Final, where they finished fifth. Winning a second consecutive national junior title, they then placed sixth at the 2020 World Junior Championships.

=== 2021–22 season: Senior international debut ===
Following the COVID-19 pandemic causing the cancellation of what would have been their final international junior season, Demougeot/Le Mercier moved up to the senior ranks for the 2021–22 season. They made their Challenger series debut at the 2021 Lombardia Trophy, finishing ninth. Making their Grand Prix debut at the 2021 Internationaux de France, they finished ninth among ten teams. After winning the bronze medal at their first senior French nationals, Demougeot/Le Mercier made their debut at the European Championships, finishing sixteenth.

=== 2022–23 season: World Championship debut ===
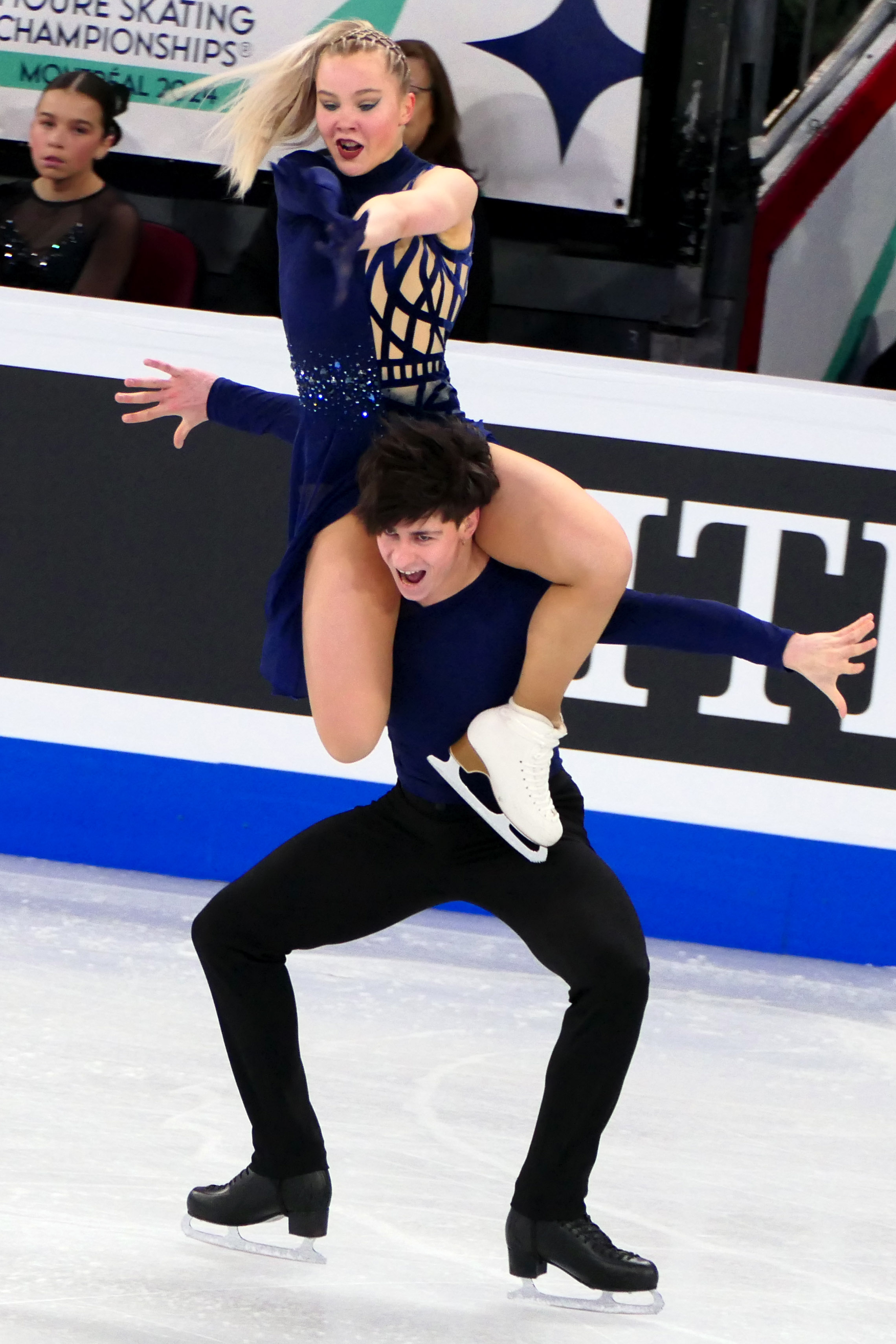
Demougeot/Le Mercier performing a lift during their free dance at the 2024 World Championships

Demougeot/Le Mercier began the 2022–23 season at the 2022 Lombardia Trophy, where they finished in fifth place. Given two Grand Prix assignments, they finished fourth at both the 2022 Skate America and the 2022 Grand Prix de France. Speaking after the latter, an enthused Le Mercier said: "if someone would have told us before the Grand Prix season that we would end up with fourth place, we wouldn't have believed it."

After winning the silver medal at the French championships, Demougeot/Le Mercier finished seventh at the 2023 European Championships. Making their World Championship debut in Saitama, Japan, they finished fourteenth.

=== 2023–24 season ===
At the 2023 Budapest Trophy, Demougeot/Le Mercier won the bronze medal, their first on the Challenger series.

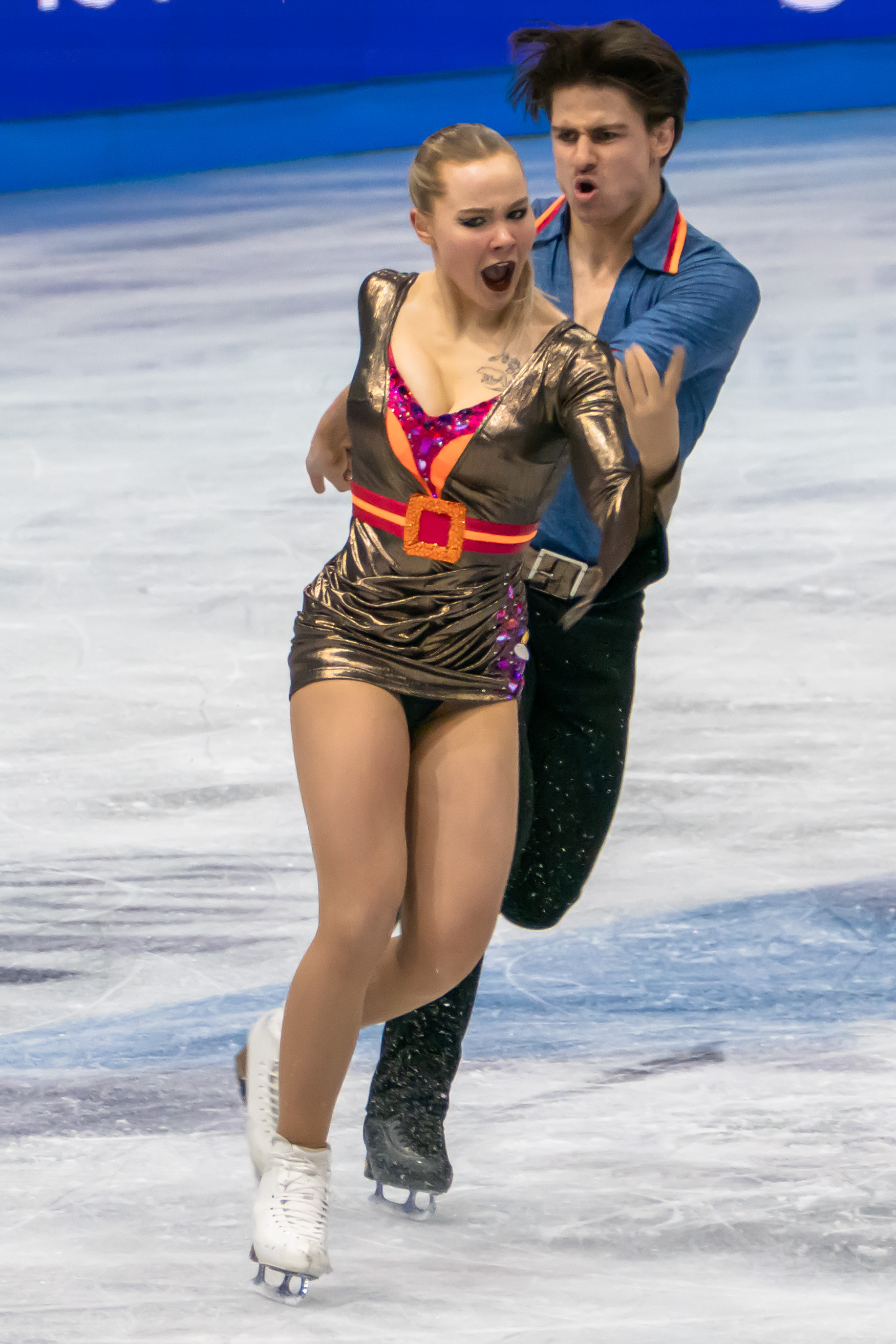
Demougeot/Le Mercier performing their rhythm dance at the 2025 World Championships

Given two Grand Prix assignments, they finished fifth at the 2023 Cup of China. They indicated they would remain in China until their second event, Japan's NHK Trophy. After training at Beijing's Olympic center, they finished fifth at NHK Trophy as well. Demougeot called the extended absence from home "tough but so rewarding at the same time."

Demougeot/Le Mercier won their second consecutive French national silver medal before competing at the 2024 European Championships in Kaunas, Lithuania. Only eighth in the rhythm dance, albeit with a new personal best, they rose to fifth overall with more new personal bests. Demougeot said "the score exceeded our expectations." In an interview in interview shortly after, the team reflected on their successful season thus far and revealed what they wanted to improve on next. They went on to win a gold medal at the International Challenge Cup.

At the 2024 World Championships in Montreal, Demougeot/Le Mercier finished eleventh in the rhythm dance with another new personal best score. Thirteenth in the free dance, they remained eleventh overall.

=== 2024–25 season ===
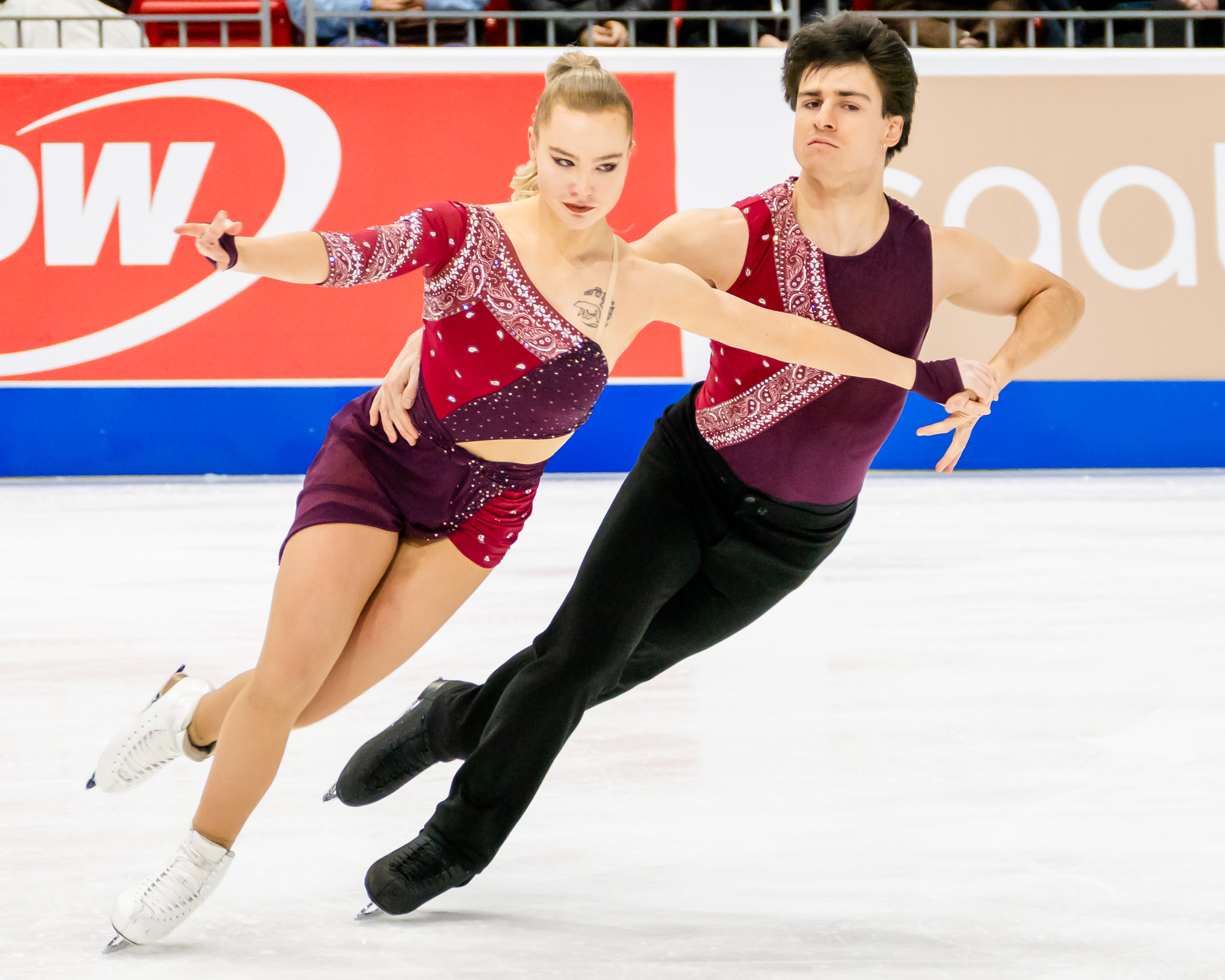
Demougeot/Le Mercier performing their rhythm dance at 2025 Skate America

Demougeot/Le Mercier began the season by winning bronze at the 2024 Master's de Patinage. Going on to compete on the 2024–25 Grand Prix series, they finished fifth at the 2024 NHK Trophy and seventh at the 2024 Cup of China.

After winning the silver medal at the 2025 French Championships, Demougeot/Le Mercier went on to win gold at the 2025 Sofia Trophy.

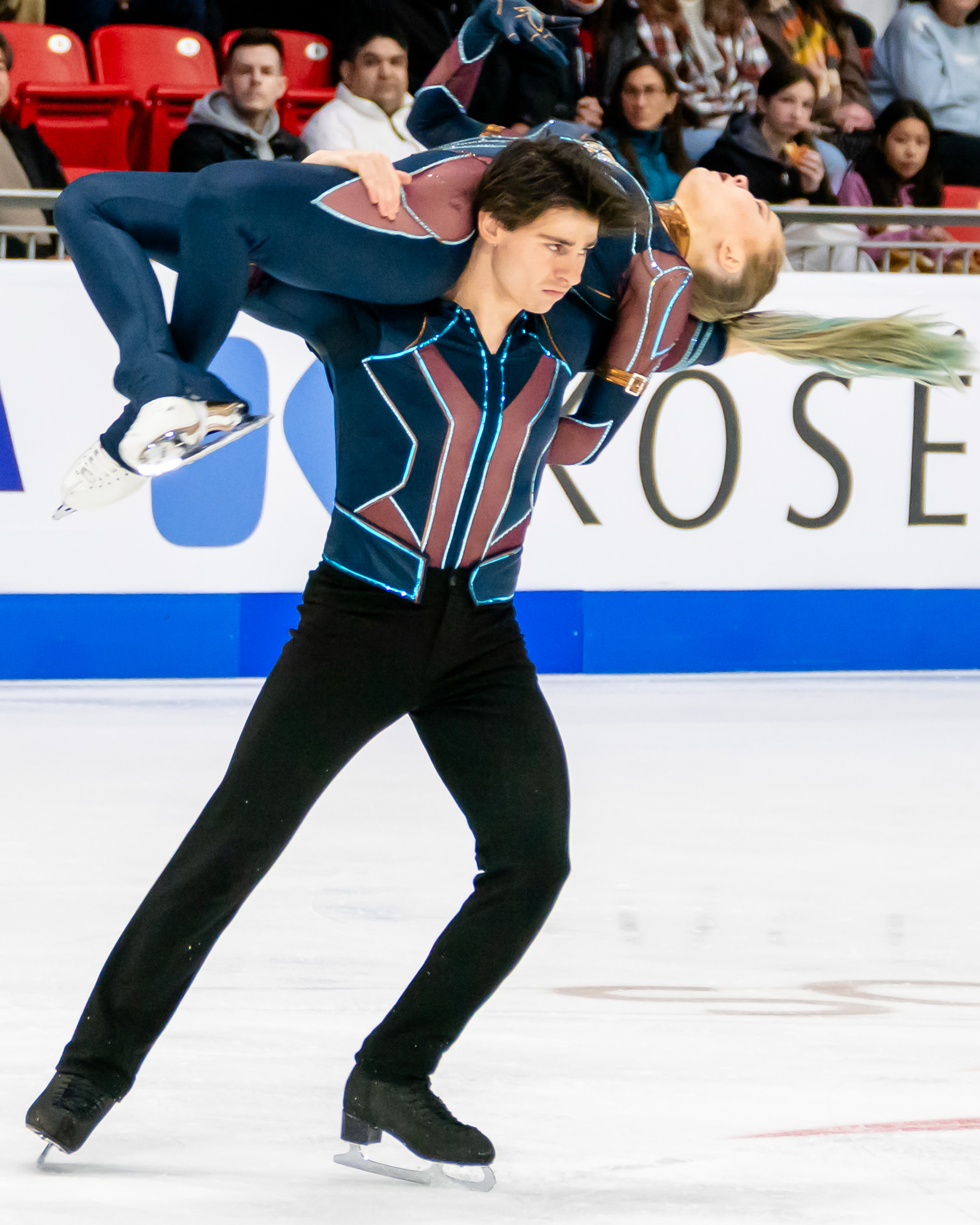
Demougeot/Le Mercier performing a lift during their free dance at 2025 Skate America

In January, the pair competed at the 2025 European Championships in Tallinn, Estonia, placing sixth in the rhythm dance, tenth in the free dance, and finishing in ninth place overall. They then went on to win gold at the 2025 International Challenge Cup.

Demougeot/Le Mercier finished the season by coming in fifteenth place at the 2025 World Championships in Boston, Massachusetts, United States.

=== 2025–26 season ===
Demougeot/Le Mercier opened the season by winning bronze at the 2025 Master's de Patinage. They then competed on the 2025–26 Challenger Series, placing fifth at the 2025 CS Nepela Memorial and winning bronze at the 2025 CS Trialeti Trophy. Going on to compete on the 2025–26 Grand Prix series, Demougeot/Le Mercier placed sixth at the 2025 Cup of China and fourth at 2025 Skate America.

In December, Demougeot/Le Mercier won the silver medal at the 2025 CS Golden Spin of Zagreb and then won bronze at the 2026 French Championships. The following month, they competed at the 2026 European Championships in Sheffield, England, United Kingdom, finishing in ninth place overall.

== Programs ==
=== Ice dance with Théo le Mercier ===
Season	Rhythm dance	Free dance	Exhibition
2025–26	No Scrubs by TLC; Sing Hallelujah! by Dr. Alban choreo. by Benoît Richaud, Karine Arribert-Narce	The Curse of the Sad Mummy by League of Legends; Enemy (from Arcane) by Imagine Dragons & JID choreo. by Benoît Richaud, Karine Arribert-Narce	
2024–25	Since I've Been Loving You; Immigrant Song by Led Zeppelin choreo. by Benoît Richaud, Karine Arribert-Narce	Akram Khan's Giselle (After A. Adam): Ceremony by Vincenzo Lamagna & Cédric Tour; Desh: Bleeding Soles by Jocelyn Pook & Lalon Shah; Flesh and Bone: Dakini: Movement IV by Adam Crystal choreo. by Benoît Richaud, Karine Arribert-Narce	
2023–2024	Rapper's Delight by The Sugarhill Gang; Why Can't We Live Together by Timmy Thomas performed by Sade choreo. by Benoît Richaud, Karine Arribert-Narce	Clair de lune by Claude Debussy; Waves by Chilly Gonzales, Boys Noize, Erol Alkan choreo. by Benoît Richaud, Karine Arribert-Narce	Rue des trois frères by Fabrizio Paterlini
2022–2023	Cha Cha: Fever performed by La Lupe; Rhumba: Somebody That I Used to Know performed by Pentatonix; Samba: Magalenha performed by Rockstarrz, A. Montana, & DJ Bo all arranged by Hugo Chouinard choreo. by Benoît Richaud, Karine Arribert-Narce	Swell by LAAKE; Gnossienne no. 3 by Erik Satie, Alexandre Tharaud; Le Di a la Caza Alcance by Michael Nyman, Estrella Morente all arranged by Cedric Tour choreo. by Benoît Richaud, Karine Arribert-Narce	Rue des trois frères by Fabrizio Paterlini
2021–2022	Blues: The Way You Make Me Feel performed by Judith Hill; Hip Hop: Billie Jean performed by Eminem, DMX, Ludacris & The Notorious B.I.G. both arranged by Hugo Chouinard choreo. by Karine Arribert-Narce	Lonlon (Ravel's Boléro) by Angélique Kidjo & Branford Marsalis choreo. by Karine Arribert-Narce	
2019–2020	Foxtrot: Your Feet's Too Big (from Ain't Misbehavin') performed by Ken Page; How Ya Baby (from Ain't Misbehavin') performed by André De Shields, Charlayne Woodard choreo. by Karine Arribert-Narce	Habanera (from Carmen) by Georges Bizet remix by Chuy Ayala; Carmen Suite by Rodion Shchedrin choreo. by Karine Arribert-Narce	
2018–2019	Tango: Codigo de Barras by Bajofondo choreo. by Karine Arribert-Narce	Killing the Name Tab by Rage Against the Machine; Nothing Else Matters by Metallica; Born to Be Wild (Easy Rider) by Steppenwolf choreo. by Karine Arribert-Narce	
	Short dance		
2017–2018	Cha-cha: El Pescador by Totó la Momposina; Rhumba: La Colegiala by Rodolfo y su Tipica RA7; Samba: Onda Tropica by Punkero Sonidero choreo. by Karine Arribert-Narce	Light of the Seven by Ramin Djawadi performed by David de Miguel; Strange by Apollo Geeze choreo. by Karine Arribert-Narce	
2016–2017	Blues: Black Swamp Village; Swing: Black Swamp Village choreo. by Karine Arribert-Narce	Tomay Gaan Shonabo by Sunidhi Chauhan choreo. by Karine Arribert-Narce	

== Competitive highlights ==
=== Ice dance with Théo le Mercier ===
- GP – Event of the ISU Grand Prix Series
- JGP – Event of the ISU Junior Grand Prix Series
- CS – Event of the ISU Challenger Series
- TBD – Assigned
- WD – Withdrew from competition

Competition placements at senior level
Season	2021–22	2022–23	2023–24	2024–25	2025–26	2026–27
World Championships		14th	11th	15th		
European Championships	16th	7th	5th	9th	9th	
French Championships	3rd	2nd	2nd	2nd	3rd	
GP Cup of China			5th	7th	6th	5th
GP France	9th	4th				
GP NHK Trophy			5th	5th		TBD
GP Skate America		4th			4th	
CS Budapest Trophy			3rd			4th
CS Golden Spin of Zagreb					2nd	
CS Lombardia Trophy	9th	5th				
CS Nepela Memorial				5th	5th	8th
CS Trialeti Trophy					3rd	
CS Warsaw Cup		1st				
Challenge Cup		2nd	1st	1st		
Master's de Patinage	4th	2nd	WD	3rd	3rd	2nd
Open d'Andorra	3rd					
Sofia Trophy				1st		
Trophée Métropole Nice	3rd					

Competition placements at junior level
Season	2015–16	2016–17	2017–18	2018–19	2019–20	2020–21
World Junior Championships			15th	8th	6th	
Junior Grand Prix Final					5th	
French Championships	6th	4th	3rd	1st	1st	2nd
JGP Canada				4th		
JGP France		8th			2nd	
JGP Italy			8th			
JGP Latvia			10th			
JGP Poland					2nd	
JGP Slovakia				5th		
Bavarian Open	11th					
Egna Dance Trophy				1st		1st
Ice Star					1st	
Master's de Patinage		5th	1st	1st	1st	1st
Mentor Toruń Cup		4th	5th	2nd	3rd	
Pavel Roman Memorial				1st		
Tallinn Trophy		9th	8th			
Volvo Open Cup					4th	

== Detailed results ==
=== Ice dance with Théo le Mercier ===
ISU personal best scores in the +5/-5 GOE System
Segment	Type	Score	Event
Total	TSS	192.15	2024 European Championships
Short program	TSS	77.88	2026 European Championships
Short program	TES	44.53	2026 European Championships
Short program	PCS	33.35	2026 European Championships
Free skating	TSS	116.46	2024 European Championships
Free skating	TES	66.60	2024 European Championships
Free skating	PCS	50.30	2025 European Championships

ISU personal best scores in the +3/-3 GOE System
Segment	Type	Score	Event
Total	TSS	118.17	2016 JGP France
Short program	TSS	51.52	2024 World Junior Championships
Short program	TES	28.64	2017 JGP Italy
Short program	PCS	23.71	2024 World Junior Championships
Free skating	TSS	69.61	2017 JGP Italy
Free skating	TES	35.75	2016 JGP France
Free skating	PCS	35.13	2017 JGP Italy

==== Senior level ====
Results in the 2021–22 season
Date	Event	RD		FD		Total	
Date	Event	P	Score	P	Score	P	Score
Sep 10–12, 2021	(Italy) 2021 CS Lombardia Trophy	10	62.61	11	90.82	9	153.43
Sep 30 – Oct 2, 2021	(France) 2021 Master's de Patinage	3	71.73	4	99.19	4	170.92
Oct 20–24, 2021	(France) 2021 Trophée Métropole Nice Côte d'Azur	3	66.84	3	96.42	3	163.26
Nov 19–21, 2021	2021 Internationaux de France	9	63.95	10	92.66	9	156.61
Nov 24–28, 2021	2021 Open d'Andorra	3	67.48	2	101.25	3	168.73
Dec 16–18, 2021	(France) 2022 French Championships	3	71.94	4	104.36	3	176.30
Jan 10–16, 2022	(Estonia) 2022 European Championships	15	64.55	15	98.22	16	162.77

Results in the 2022–23 season
Date	Event	RD		FD		Total	
Date	Event	P	Score	P	Score	P	Score
Sep 16–19, 2022	(Italy) 2022 CS Lombardia Trophy	5	63.87	4	103.08	5	166.95
Oct 6–8, 2022	(France) 2022 Master's de Patinage	2	74.44	2	112.33	2	186.77
Oct 21–23, 2022	(United States) 2022 Skate America	7	65.90	4	104.99	4	170.89
Nov 4–6, 2022	2022 Grand Prix de France	4	70.76	4	109.00	4	179.76
Nov 17–20, 2022	(Poland) 2022 CS Warsaw Cup	2	72.13	1	109.87	1	182.00
Dec 15–17, 2022	(France) 2023 French Championships	2	75.95	2	112.94	2	188.89
Jan 25–29, 2023	(Finland) 2023 European Championships	7	72.55	7	107.41	7	179.96
Feb 23–26, 2023	(Netherlands) 2023 International Challenge Cup	2	72.80	3	107.20	2	180.00
Mar 22–26, 2023	(Japan) 2023 World Championships	13	69.88	14	106.97	14	176.85

Results in the 2023–24 season
Date	Event	RD		FD		Total	
Date	Event	P	Score	P	Score	P	Score
Sep 28–30, 2023	(France) 2023 Master's de Patinage	2	72.66	–	–	–	WD
Oct 13–15, 2023	(Hungary) 2023 CS Budapest Trophy	3	69.37	3	110.31	3	179.68
Nov 10–12, 2023	2023 Cup of China	7	70.18	5	109.92	5	180.10
Nov 24–26, 2023	(Japan) 2023 NHK Trophy	5	73.58	5	114.18	5	187.76
Dec 9–14, 2024	(France) 2024 French Championships	3	73.70	2	115.29	2	188.99
Jan 10–14, 2024	(Lithuania) 2024 European Championships	8	75.69	5	116.46	5	192.15
Feb 22–25, 2024	(Netherlands) 2024 International Challenge Cup	1	76.76	1	113.29	1	190.05
Mar 18–24, 2024	(Canada) 2024 World Championships	11	75.74	13	114.26	11	190.00

Results in the 2024–25 season
Date	Event	RD		FD		Total	
Date	Event	P	Score	P	Score	P	Score
Sep 26–28, 2024	(France) 2024 Master's de Patinage	3	73.02	3	105.92	3	178.94
Oct 24-26, 2024	(Czech Republic) 2024 CS Nepela Memorial	5	68.57	4	109.88	5	178.45
Nov 8–10, 2024	(Japan) 2024 NHK Trophy	5	69.24	5	109.06	5	178.30
Nov 22–24, 2024	2024 Cup of China	7	73.50	8	111.73	7	185.23
Dec 20–21, 2024	(France) 2025 French Championships	2	73.95	2	112.17	2	186.12
Jan 7-12, 2025	(Bulgaria) 2025 Sofia Trophy	1	78.31	1	115.95	1	194.26
Jan 28 – Feb 2, 2025	(Estonia) 2025 European Championships	6	76.14	10	113.87	9	190.01
Feb 13–16, 2025	(Netherlands) 2025 Challenge Cup	1	78.07	1	115.08	1	193.15
Mar 25–30, 2025	(United States) 2025 World Championships	15	72.82	15	108.89	15	181.51

Results in the 2025–26 season
Date	Event	RD		FD		Total	
Date	Event	P	Score	P	Score	P	Score
Aug 28–30, 2025	(France) 2025 Master's de Patinage	3	76.91	2	113.44	3	190.35
Sep 25–27, 2025	(Slovakia) 2025 CS Nepela Memorial	3	72.72	4	110.33	5	183.05
Oct 8–11, 2025	(Georgia (country)) 2025 CS Trialeti Trophy	2	71.49	3	106.60	3	178.09
Oct 24–26, 2025	2025 Cup of China	4	74.32	6	109.88	6	184.20
Nov 14–16, 2025	(United States) 2025 Skate America	4	73.47	5	113.22	4	186.69
Dec 3–6, 2025	(Croatia) 2025 CS Golden Spin of Zagreb	3	75.77	2	112.07	2	187.84
Dec 18–20, 2025	(France) 2026 French Championships	3	80.30	3	113.77	3	194.07
Jan 13–18, 2026	(United Kingdom) 2026 European Championships	8	77.88	9	113.74	9	191.62

Results in the 2026–27 season
Date	Event	SP		FS		Total	
Date	Event	P	Score	P	Score	P	Score
Aug 27–29, 2026	(France) 2026 Master's de Patinage	2	73.35	2	107.90	2	181.25
Sep 24–27, 2026	(Slovakia) 2026 CS Nepela Memorial	6	73.40	8	104.40	8	177.80
Oct 15–18, 2026	(Hungary) 2026 CS Budapest Trophy	3	76.00	7	102.55	4	178.55
Nov 6–8, 2026	2026 Cup of China	4	71.41	4	105.53	5	176.94

==== Junior level ====
Results in the 2015–16 season
Date	Event	SD		FD		Total	
Date	Event	P	Score	P	Score	P	Score
Feb 17–21, 2016	(Germany) 2016 Bavarian Open	11	44.32	11	58.76	11	103.08
Feb 27–28, 2016	(France) 2016 French Championships (Junior)	6	45.04	9	65.50	6	110.54

Results in the 2016–17 season
Date	Event	SD		FD		Total	
Date	Event	P	Score	P	Score	P	Score
Aug 24–28, 2016	2016 JGP France	7	48.74	8	69.43	8	118.17
Oct 6–8, 2016	(France) 2016 Master's de Patinage	5	43.79	4	66.17	5	109.96
Nov 19–27, 2016	(Estonia) 2016 Tallinn Trophy	8	52.25	9	69.57	9	121.82
Jan 10–15, 2017	(Poland) 2017 Mentor Toruń Cup	4	47.74	4	70.60	4	118.34
Feb 24–26, 2017	(France) 2017 French Championships (Junior)	1	56.14	4	73.74	4	129.88

Results in the 2017–18 season
Date	Event	SD		FD		Total	
Date	Event	P	Score	P	Score	P	Score
Sep 6–9, 2017	2017 JGP Latvia	10	42.48	10	57.55	10	100.03
Sep 28–30, 2017	(France) 2017 Master's de Patinage	1	52.99	1	71.33	1	124.32
Oct 11–14, 2017	2017 JGP Italy	9	47.11	8	69.61	8	116.72
Nov 21–26, 2017	(Estonia) 2017 Tallinn Trophy	8	49.22	6	71.26	8	120.48
Jan 30 – Feb 4, 2018	(Poland) 2018 Mentor Toruń Cup	5	49.56	5	66.90	5	116.46
Feb 23–25, 2018	(France) 2018 French Championships (Junior)	3	46.18	3	62.90	3	109.08
Mar 5–11, 2018	(Bulgaria) 2018 World Junior Championships	14	51.52	15	66.08	15	117.60

Results in the 2018–19 season
Date	Event	RD		FD		Total	
Date	Event	P	Score	P	Score	P	Score
Aug 22–25, 2018	2018 JGP Slovakia	5	55.72	4	77.86	5	133.58
Sep 12–15, 2018	2018 JGP Canada	4	58.36	5	84.60	4	142.96
Sep 25–27, 2018	(France) 2018 Master's de Patinage	1	57.37	1	82.32	1	139.69
Nov 9–11, 2018	(Czech Republic) 2018 Pavel Roman Memorial	1	57.89	1	86.68	1	144.57
Jan 8–13, 2019	(Poland) 2019 Mentor Toruń Cup	3	58.22	3	87.19	2	145.41
Feb 1–3, 2019	(Italy) 2019 Egna Dance Trophy	1	59.89	1	92.00	1	151.89
Feb 22–24, 2019	(France) 2019 French Championships (Junior)	1	59.45	1	91.21	1	150.66
Mar 4–10, 2019	(Croatia) 2019 World Junior Championships	7	59.33	9	85.00	8	144.33

Results in the 2019–20 season
Date	Event	RD		FD		Total	
Date	Event	P	Score	P	Score	P	Score
Aug 21–24, 2019	2019 JGP France	1	63.78	2	97.23	2	161.01
Sep 18–21, 2019	2019 JGP Poland	2	65.82	3	96.88	2	162.70
Sep 26–28, 2019	(France) 2019 Master's de Patinage	1	66.41	1	104.60	1	171.01
Dec 5–8, 2019	(Italy) 2019–20 Junior Grand Prix Final	5	62.84	5	93.42	5	156.26
Feb 7–9, 2020	(France) 2020 French Championships (Junior)	1	71.22	1	107.44	1	178.66
Mar 2–8, 2020	(Estonia) 2020 World Junior Championships	6	64.88	6	97.64	6	162.52

Results in the 2020–21 season
Date	Event	RD		FD		Total	
Date	Event	P	Score	P	Score	P	Score
Oct 1–3, 2020	(France) 2020 Master's de Patinage	1	68.18	1	91.48	1	159.66
Feb 6–7, 2021	(Italy) 2021 Egna Dance Trophy	1	68.61	1	96.79	1	165.40
Apr 3–4, 2021	(France) 2021 French Championships (Junior)	1	68.14	2	92.79	2	160.93
