= Candice Didier =

French figure skater

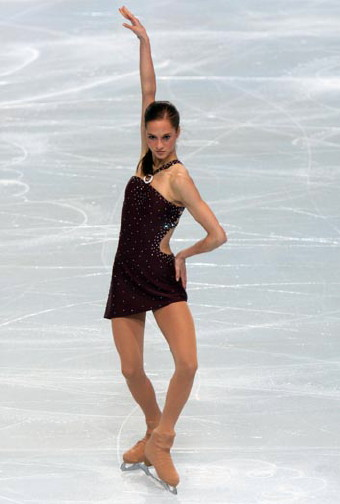
- Didier at the 2008 Trophée Eric Bompard.

Personal information
- Full name: Candice Didier
- Born: 14 January 1988 (age 38) Strasbourg, France
- Height: 1.71 m (5 ft 7 in)

Figure skating career
- Country: France
- Coach: Katia Krier Beyer
- Skating club: CPHNL Nancy
Medal record
French Championships
Gold medal – first place	2003 Asnières	Ladies’ Singles

Candice Didier (born 15 January 1988 in Strasbourg) is a French former competitive figure skater. She is the 2011 Winter Universiade champion and a three-time (2003, 2004, 2009) French national champion. She reached the free skate at five ISU Championships; her best results were 14th at the 2003 Junior Worlds in Ostrava and 13th at the 2009 Europeans in Helsinki.

Didier was coached by Carole Laguerre-Laplanche in Nancy and by Katia Krier in Paris. In 2012, she joined Diana Skotnická in Courbevoie. Didier retired from competition in 2014.

== Programs ==
Season	Short program	Free skating	Exhibition
2009–2011	Jean de Florette by Jean Claude Petit; La forza del destino by Giuseppe Verdi (from Manon des Sources by Jean Claude Petit)	Romantica Rhapsody by Sébastien Damiani	Sympathique (Je Ne Veux Pas Travailler) by Pink Martini
2008–2009	Blues for Klook by Eddy Louiss	Toccata and Fugue in D minor, BWV 565 by Johann Sebastian Bach	La Foule by Édith Piaf; Memory by Barbra Streisand; Hometown Glory by Adele
2007–2008	Blues for Klook by Eddy Louiss	Beethoven's Last Night by Trans-Siberian Orchestra	Memory by Barbra Streisand; Man! I Feel Like a Woman! by Shania Twain
2006–2007	Somewhere in Time; The Old Woman by Maksim Mrvica	Hook by John Williams	La Foule by Édith Piaf
2005–2006	Otonal by Raúl Di Blasio	Pearl Harbor by Hans Zimmer	
2004–2005	Illumination by Rolf Løvland performed by Secret Garden	Casper by James Horner	
2003–2004	Esperanza by Maxime Rodriguez	La Sirene by Maxime Rodriguez	
2002–2003	Schindler's List by John Williams	La Sirene by Maxime Rodriguez; Xotica by René Dupéré	

== Competitive highlights ==
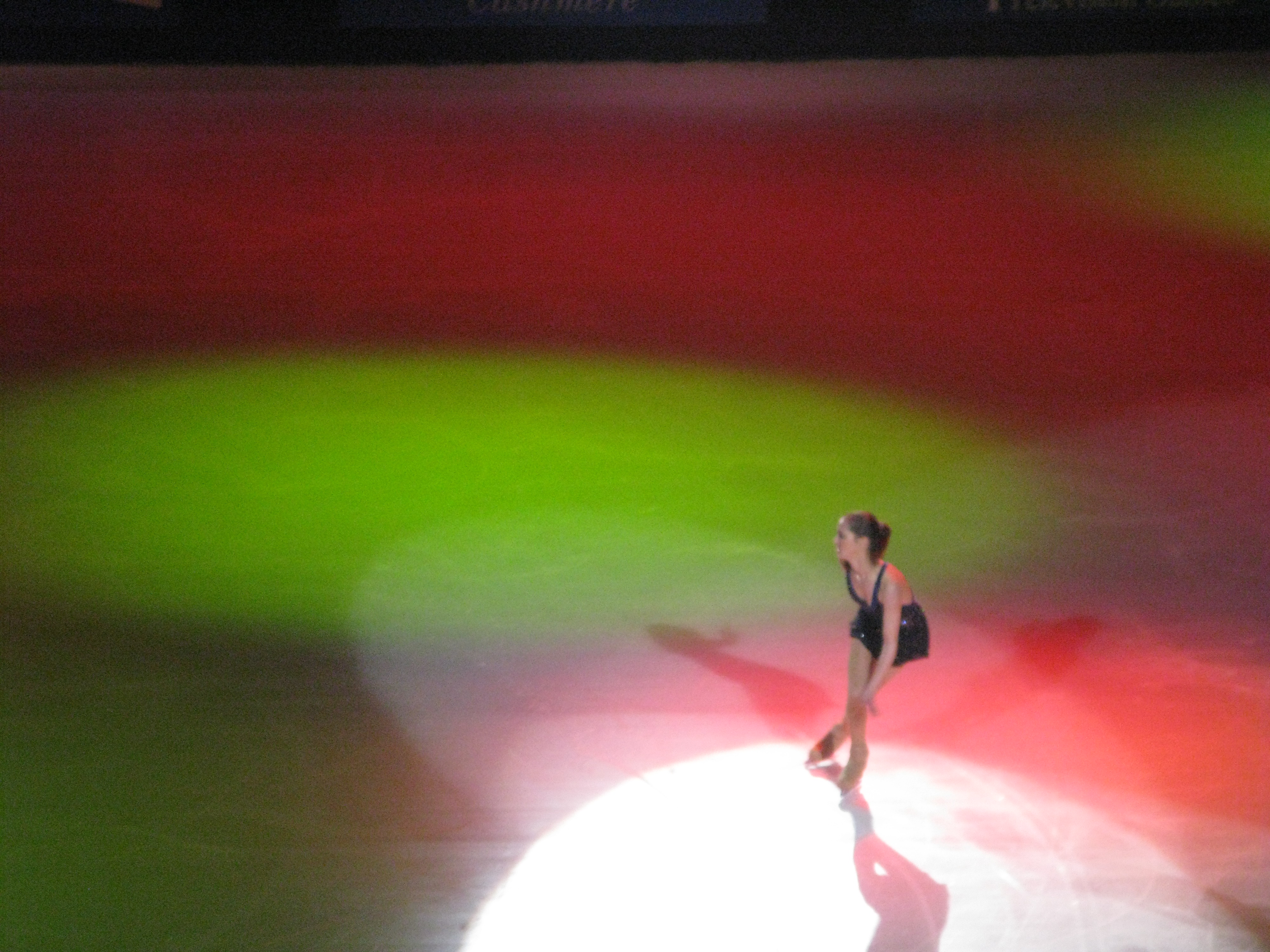
Didier at Bompard 2010.

GP: Grand Prix; JGP: Junior Grand Prix

International
Event	02–03	03–04	04–05	05–06	06–07	07–08	08–09	09–10	10–11	11–12	12–13	13–14
Worlds			23rd			38th	22nd					
Europeans		25th	21st				13th					
GP Bompard		10th			11th		4th		11th			
GP Skate Canada		11th										
Challenge Cup							5th					
Cup of Nice						8th	4th	23rd	8th			7th
Merano Cup			3rd									
NRW Trophy							6th		5th			
Schäfer Memorial				19th								
Universiade									1st			12th
Volvo Open Cup												10th
Warsaw Cup											18th	
International: Junior
Junior Worlds	14th											
JGP China	10th											
JGP France	11th											
National
French Champ.	1st	1st		5th	2nd	4th	1st		6th			
Masters							1st		1st	5th	4th	2nd
Team events
World Team; Trophy							4th T 10th P					
WD = Withdrew; T = Team result; P = Personal result. Medals awarded for team result only.
