= Romain Ponsart =

French figure skater

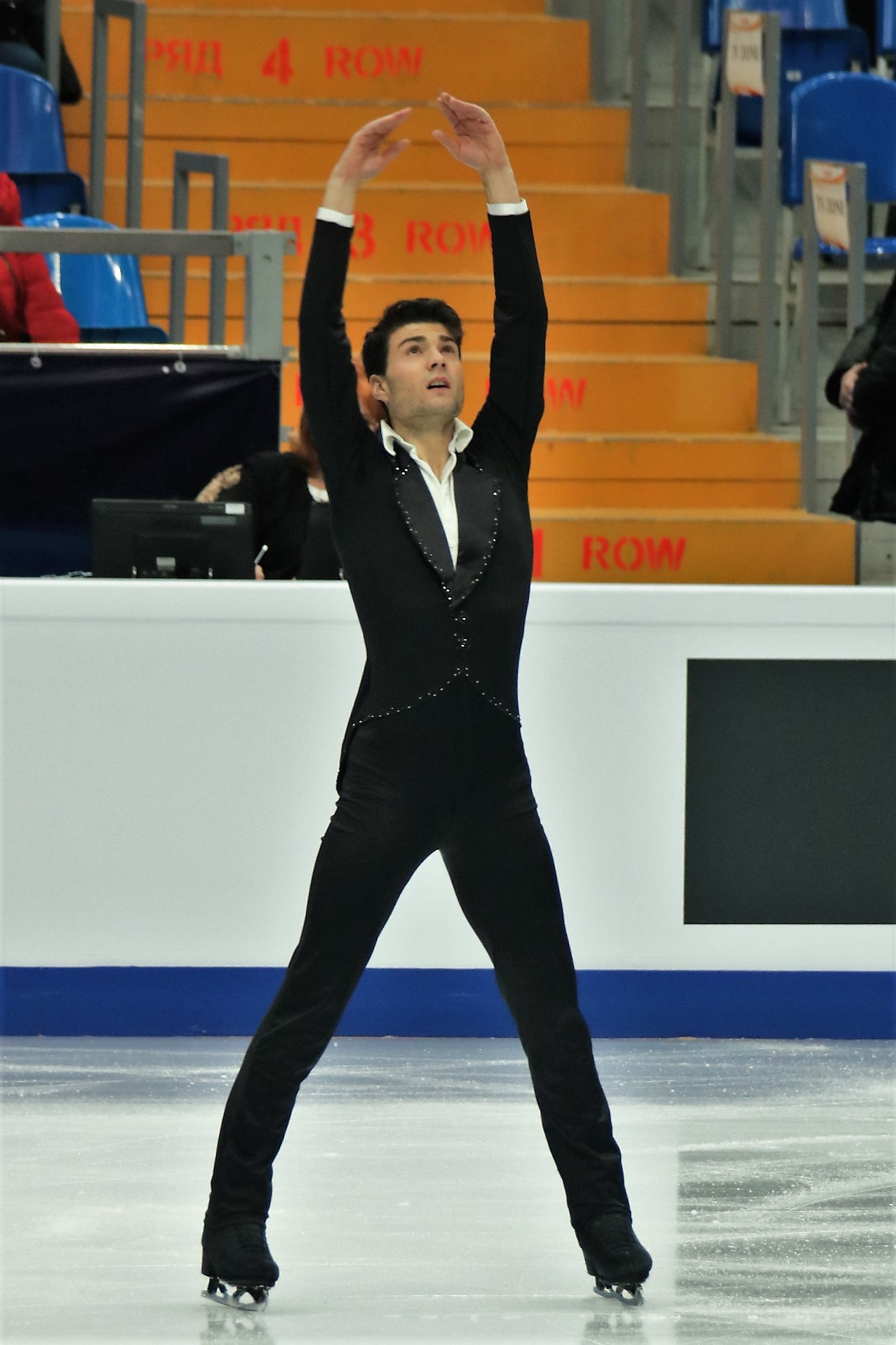
- Romain Ponsart at the 2018 European Championships

Personal information
- Born: 27 April 1992 (age 34) Charleville-Mézières, France
- Height: 1.84 m (6 ft 1/2 in)

Figure skating career
- Country: France
- Discipline: Men's singles
- Began skating: 1998
- Retired: 2022

Medal record
French Championships
Silver medal – second place	2015 Magève	Singles
Bronze medal – third place	2013 Strasbourg	Singles
Bronze medal – third place	2017 Caen	Singles
Bronze medal – third place	2018 Nantes	Singles
Bronze medal – third place	2020 Dunkirk	Singles
Bronze medal – third place	2021 Vaujany	Singles

Romain Ponsart (born 27 April 1992) is a retired French figure skater. He is the 2012 Triglav Trophy bronze medalist and 2015 Toruń Cup champion. He is a six-time French National medalist.

== Personal life ==
Ponsart was born on 27 April 1992 in Charleville-Mézières, France. He was previously engaged to American figure skater Mariah Bell.

== Career ==
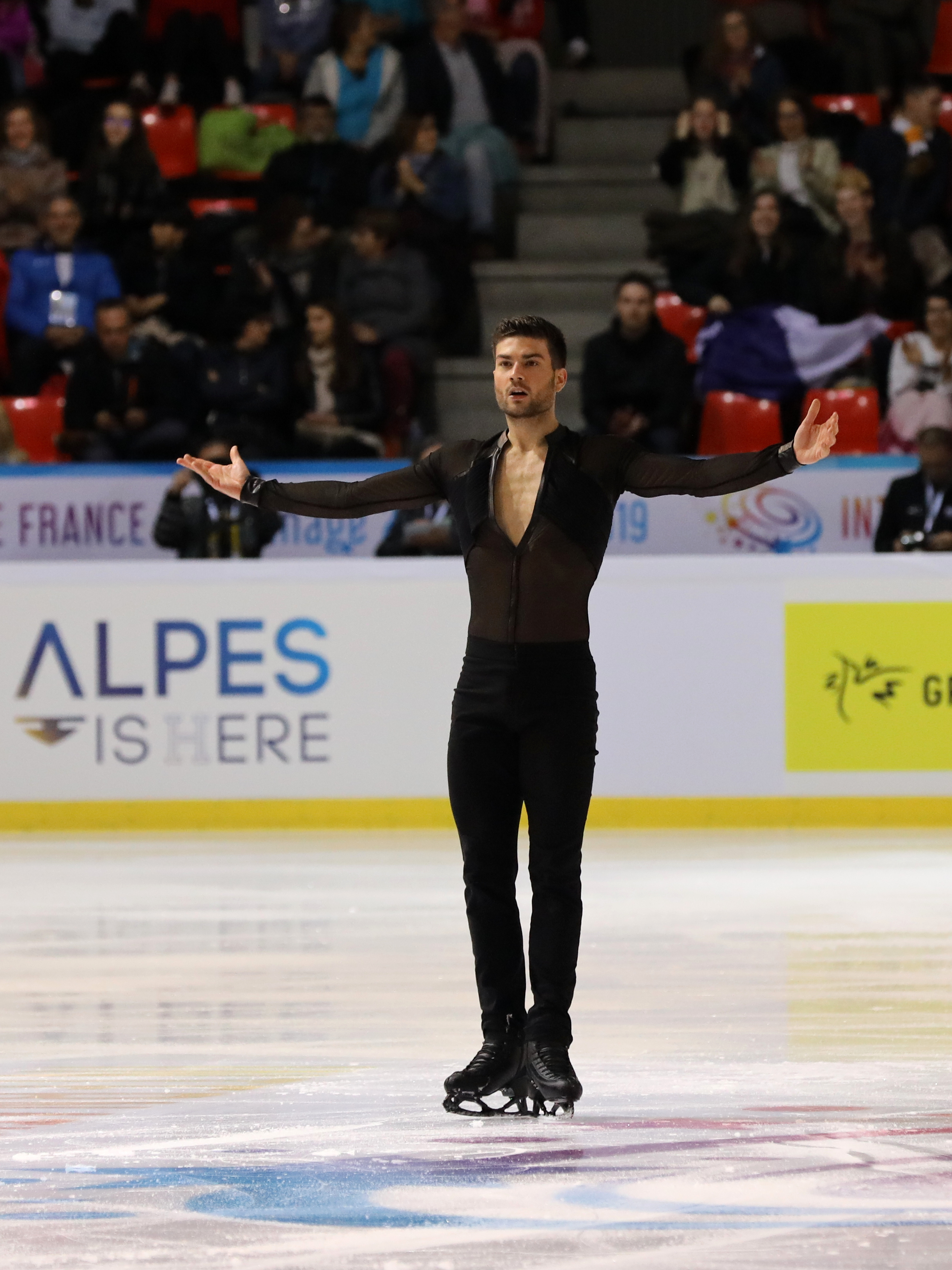
Ponsart at the 2019 Internationaux de France

Ponsart began competing on the ISU Junior Grand Prix series in 2009. In 2011, he was selected to compete at the World Junior Championships and finished 17th.

In the 2011–12 season, Ponsart received his first senior Grand Prix assignment, the 2011 Trophée Éric Bompard, and placed eighth. At the end of the season, he won his first senior international medal, bronze at the 2012 Triglav Trophy. The following season, he struggled with injuries.

In October 2013, Ponsart injured his ankle at the Master's de Patinage, causing him to withdraw from the 2013 Trophée Éric Bompard.

In August 2015, Ponsart relocated to Poitiers to train with new coach Brian Joubert. However, the two had disagreements regarding training and ended the coaching relationship in November of that year.

In 2016, Ponsart began training under his new coach, Rafael Arutyunyan.

== Programs ==
Season	Short program	Free skating
2019–2020	Poeta by Vincente Amigo	The Greatest Showman by Hugh Jackman
2018–2019	In This Shirt by The Irrepressibles	Carmen by Georges Bizet
2015–2016	Je Suis Malade by Serge Lama	Violin Concerto by Pyotr Tchaikovsky
2014–2015	Nessun dorma (from Turandot) by Giacomo Puccini performed by Luciano Pavarotti	Inception by Hans Zimmer
2012–2013	Minnie the Moocher (from The Blues Brothers)	Black Swan by Clint Mansell, Pyotr Tchaikovsky
2011–2012	Art on Ice by Edvin Marton; Totentanz by Franz Liszt performed Maksim Mrvica	Romeo and Juliet by Sergei Prokofiev
2010–2011	Leyenda performed by Vanessa-Mae	Tosca by Giacomo Puccini
2008–2009	Toccata and Fugue by Johann Sebastian Bach performed by Vanessa-Mae	The Four Seasons by Antonio Vivaldi; The Four Seasons performed by Vanessa-Mae

== Competitive highlights ==
GP: Grand Prix; CS: Challenger Series; JGP: Junior Grand Prix

International
Event	07–08	08–09	09–10	10–11	11–12	12–13	13–14	14–15	15–16	16–17	17–18	18–19	19–20	20–21	21–22
Worlds											16th				
Europeans											14th				
GP France					8th		WD	WD	11th	WD	11th	6th	9th	C	11th
GP Skate America												10th	WD		
CS Lombardia Trophy															6th
Bavarian Open						4th									
Challenge Cup														2nd	
Cup of Nice					5th			9th		14th	4th				2nd
Nebelhorn					14th										
NRW Trophy										3rd					
Printemps											3rd				
Toruń Cup								1st							
Triglav Trophy				5th	3rd										
Universiade								9th		11th					
Tallink Hotels Cup														2nd	
Tayside Trophy															2nd
Volvo Cup						4th									
International: Junior
Junior Worlds				17th											
JGP Belarus			6th												
JGP Croatia			6th												
JGP France				5th											
JGP Germany				5th											
National
French Champ.	11th	6th	7th	5th		3rd		2nd	4th	3rd	3rd	WD	3rd	3rd	4th
Masters			1st J	2nd J	4th	4th	3rd	3rd	1st		1st	4th	7th	4th	4th
Team events
World Team; Trophy						6th T 11th P		6th T 12th P							
WD = Withdrew; C = Event Cancelled; T = Team result; P = Personal result. Medals awarded for team result only.
