= Annick Dumont =

French figure skating coach

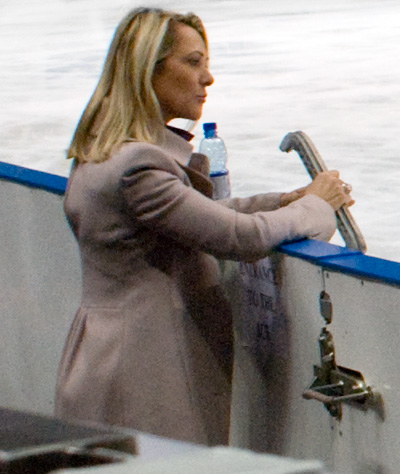
Annick Dumont before Alban Préaubert's short program at the 2010 Cup of Russia.

Annick Dumont (born 14 February 1962, in Montreuil) is a French figure skating coach. She coaches in Champigny, alongside Pierre Trente. Among her current and former students are two time European Figure Skating Championships bronze medalist Stanick Jeannette, Gabriel Monnier, Jérémy Prévoteaux, Vincent Restencourt, two time French champion Laëtitia Hubert, four time French silver medalist Frédéric Dambier, Alban Préaubert and Florent Amodio.

She was married to Didier Gailhaguet and was referred to as Annick Gailhaguet.

Dumont is a skating consultant for French television alongside the sports journalist Nelson Monfort.
