= Triglav Trophy =

International figure skating competition

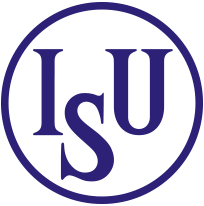
- Location: Slovenia

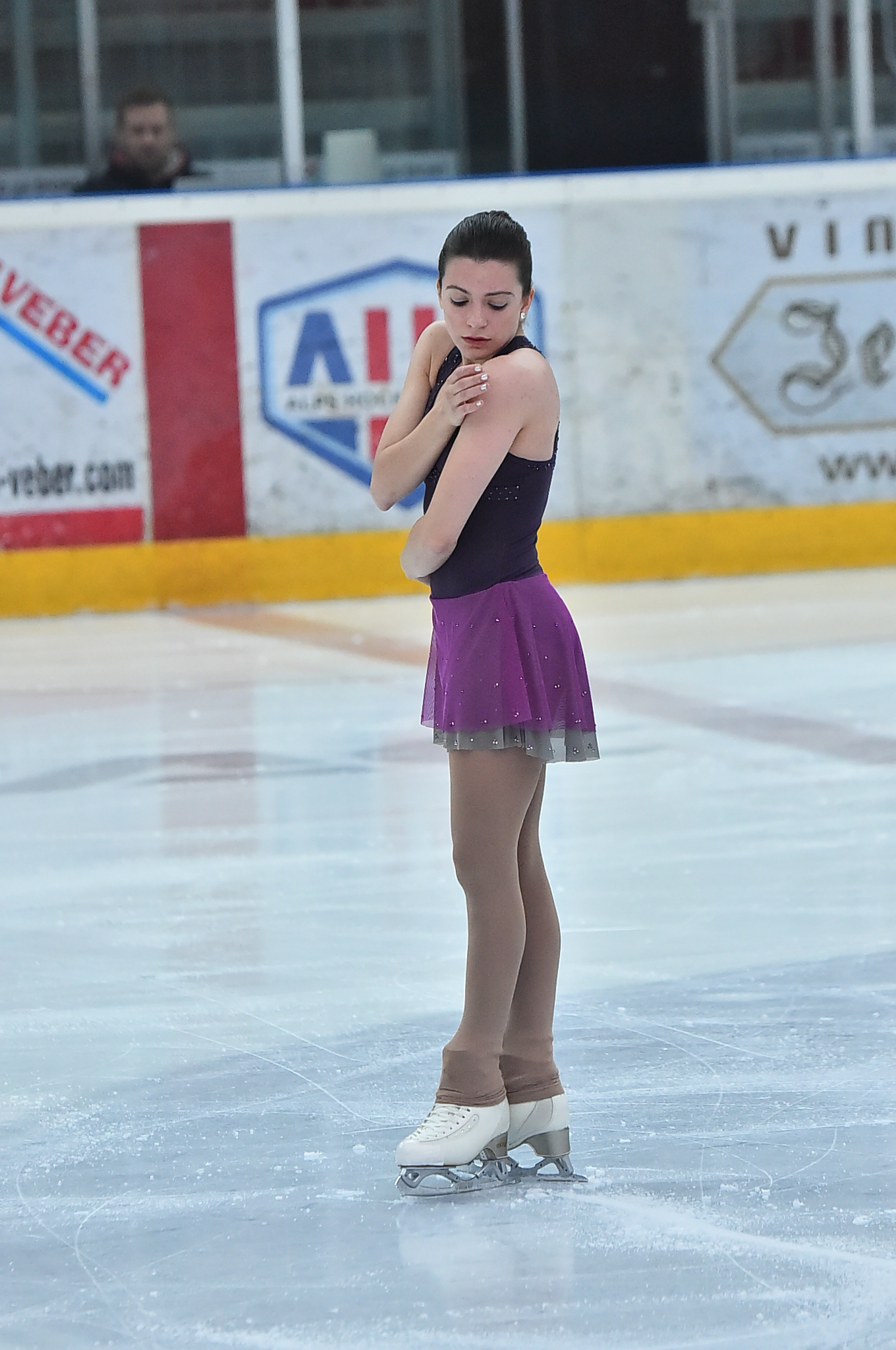
Dimitra Korri at the 2018 Triglav Trophy

The Triglav Trophy is an international figure skating competition which is generally held in the spring in Jesenice, Slovenia. The competition takes its name from the nearby mountain Triglav, the highest peak in Slovenia. Medals may be awarded in men's singles, women's singles, and pair skating at the senior, junior, and novice levels.

== Senior results ==
=== Men's singles ===
Year	Gold	Silver	Bronze	Ref.
2003	(Slovenia) Gregor Urbas	(Finland) Mikko Minkkinen	(Spain) Yon Garcia	
2004	(Slovenia) Gregor Urbas	(North Korea) Han Jong-in	No other competitors	
2005	(Slovenia) Gregor Urbas	(Spain) Juan Legaz	No other competitors	
2006	(Slovenia) Gregor Urbas	(France) Jérémie Colot	(Italy) Paolo Bacchini	
2007	(Slovenia) Gregor Urbas	(Slovenia) Luka Čadež	(Denmark) Nicolai Lonvig Siersted	
2008	(Italy) Paolo Bacchini	(Slovakia) Igor Macypura	(Austria) Severin Kiefer	
2009	(France) Alban Préaubert	(Slovenia) Gregor Urbas	(Kazakhstan) Abzal Rakimgaliev	
2010	(Japan) Takahito Mura	(Sweden) Alexander Majorov	(France) Chafik Besseghier	
2011	(Japan) Tatsuki Machida	(Japan) Daisuke Murakami	(Kazakhstan) Abzal Rakimgaliev	
2012	(Kazakhstan) Abzal Rakimgaliev	(Austria) Viktor Pfeifer	(France) Romain Ponsart	
2013	(Russia) Artur Gachinski	(Kazakhstan) Abzal Rakimgaliev	(Japan) Daisuke Murakami	
2014	(Philippines) Michael Christian Martinez	(Japan) Keiji Tanaka	(Japan) Ryuju Hino	
2015	(Philippines) Michael Christian Martinez	(South Korea) Lee June-hyoung	(Italy) Maurizio Zandron	
2016	(Canada) Liam Firus	(Italy) Maurizio Zandron	(United Kingdom) Charlie Parry-Evans	
2017	(Russia) Alexander Petrov	(Russia) Andrei Lazukin	(Italy) Dario Betti	
2018	(Hungary) Alexander Borovoj	(Italy) Alessandro Fadini	(Austria) Manuel Drechsler	
2019	(Hungary) Andras Csernoch	(Hungary) Alexander Maszljanko	(Mexico) Diego Saldana	
2020–21	Cancelled due to the COVID-19 pandemic			
2022	(Italy) Emanuele Indelicato	(Republic of Ireland) Samuel McAllister	(Slovenia) David Sedej	
2023	(Japan) Nozomu Yoshioka	(Japan) Sumitada Moriguchi	(Italy) Gabriele Frangipani	
2024	(Spain) Iker Oyarzábal	(Switzerland) Nico Steffen	(Republic of Ireland) Dillon Judge	
2025	(Estonia) Jegor Martsenko	(Spain) Pablo García	No other competitors	

=== Women's singles ===
Year	Gold	Silver	Bronze	Ref.
2003	(Netherlands) Karen Venhuizen	(Finland) Sanna Remes	(Slovenia) Alenka Zidar	
2004	(North Korea) Kim Yong-suk	(Italy) Giorgia Carrossa	(Switzerland) Myriam Flühmann	
2005	(Italy) Francesca Mongini	(Spain) Laura Fernandez	(Slovenia) Alenka Zidar	
2006	(Canada) Erin Scherrer	(Belgium) Isabelle Pieman	(Croatia) Željka Krizmanić	
2007	(Slovenia) Kaja Otovič	No other competitors		
2008	(Italy) Francesca Rio	(Slovakia) Ivana Reitmayerová	(Belgium) Isabelle Pieman	
2009	(Germany) Sarah Hecken	(South Korea) Kim Na-young	(South Korea) Kim Hyeon-jung	
2010	(Japan) Satsuki Muramoto	(Sweden) Joshi Helgesson	(Austria) Miriam Ziegler	
2011	(Japan) Akiko Suzuki	(Japan) Kana Muramoto	(Slovenia) Patricia Gleščič	
2012	(China) Li Zijun	(Russia) Kristina Zaseeva	(France) Lénaëlle Gilleron-Gorry	
2013	(Russia) Nikol Gosviani	(Japan) Miyabi Oba	(Russia) Polina Agafonova	
2014	(Japan) Rika Hongo	(Italy) Francesca Rio	(Sweden) Isabelle Olsson	
2015	(Japan) Miyu Nakashio	(Japan) Yura Matsuda	(Italy) Ilaria Nogaro	
2016	(Japan) Mariko Kihara	(Italy) Ilaria Nogaro	(Italy) Alessia Zardini	
2017	(Australia) Brooklee Han	(Germany) Jennifer Schmidt	(Italy) Guia Maria Tagliapietra	
2018	(Italy) Lucrezia Gennaro	(Switzerland) Yoonmi Lehmann	(Singapore) Ceciliane Mei Ling Hartmann	
2019	(Italy) Elettra Maria Olivotto	(Liechtenstein) Romana Kaiser	(Slovenia) Marusa Udrih	
2020–21	Cancelled due to the COVID-19 pandemic			
2022	(South Korea) Lee Hae-in	(United Kingdom) Kristen Spours	(Italy) Ester Schwarz	
2023	(Japan) Hana Yoshida	(Japan) Yuna Aoki	(Italy) Ginevra Negrello	
2024	(Italy) Marina Piredda	(United Kingdom) Kristen Spours	(Slovenia) Julija Lovrencic	
2025	(Italy) Marina Piredda	(Greece) Lucrezia Gennaro	(Italy) Ginevra Lavinia Negrello	

== Junior results ==
=== Men's singles ===
Year	Gold	Silver	Bronze	Ref.
1992	(Slovenia) Jan Čejvan			
1993	(Japan) Makoto Okazaki			
1994	(Germany) Michael Hopfes			
1995	(Bulgaria) Hristo Turlakov	(Japan) Yohsuke Takeuchi	(Japan) Takeshi Honda	
1996	(Canada) Emanuel Sandhu	(France) Johann Sand'homme	(France) Nicolas Beaudelin	
1997	(United States) Justin Dillon	(Japan) Eiji Iwamoto	(Canada) Fedor Andreev	
1998	(United States) Ryan Bradley	(Russia) Stanislav Timchenko	(France) Jean-Michel Debay	
1999	(Japan) Eiji Iwamoto	(Slovenia) Gregor Urbas	(Canada) Marc-Olivier Bossé	
2000	(United States) Parker Pennington	(Slovenia) Gregor Urbas	(France) Jean Michel Debay	
2001	(Slovenia) Gregor Urbas	(United States) Rohene Ward	(Canada) Kevin Woytas	
2002	(United States) Evan Lysacek	(Slovenia) Gregor Urbas	(United States) Benjamin Miller	
2003	(United States) Jordan Brauninger	(United States) Jason Wong	(Canada) Vaughn Chipeur	
2004	(United States) Douglas Razzano	(North Korea) Ri Song-choil	(Canada) Dylan Moscovitch	
2005	(United States) Adam Rippon	(United States) William Brewster	(Slovenia) Luka Čadež	
2006	(United States) Brandon Mroz	(Canada) Jamie Forsythe	(Canada) Dave Ferland	
2007	(France) Christopher Boyadji	(Kazakhstan) Abzal Rakimgaliyev	(France) Romain Ponsart	
2008	(Spain) Javier Raya	(Italy) Luca Demattè	(Turkey) Egin Ali Artan	
2009	(France) Morgan Cipres	(France) Romain Ponsart	(Switzerland) Stephane Walker	
2010	(Italy) Filippo Ambrosini	(Sweden) Anton Marberg	(Switzerland) Sergey Balashov	
2011	(France) Charles Tetar	(Turkey) Engin Ali Artan	(France) Gaylord Lavoisier	
2012	(France) Charles Tetar	(France) Adrien Tesson	(United Kingdom) Charlie Parry-Evans	
2013	(Russia) Alexander Petrov	(Japan) Taichi Honda	(United Kingdom) Charlie Parry-Evans	
2014	(Germany) Anton Kempf	(France) Daniel Naurits	(Italy) Marco Zandron	
2015	(South Korea) Byun Se-jong	(United Kingdom) Hugh Brabyn Jones	(Hungary) Andras Csernoch	
2016	(United States) Emmanuel Savary	(United Kingdom) Josh Brown	(United Kingdom) Ruaridh Fisher	
2017	(United Kingdom) Ruaridh Fisher	(Republic of Ireland) Samuel McAllister	No other competitors	
2019	(France) François Pitot	(Austria) Valentin Eisenbauer	(Hong Kong) Naoki Ma	
2020–21	Cancelled due to the COVID-19 pandemic			
2022	(South Korea) Kim Hyun-gyeom	(Slovakia) Marko Piliar	(Italy) Tommaso Barison	
2023	(Japan) Shunsuke Nakamura	(Japan) Rio Nakata	(Austria) Tobia Oellerer	
2024	(Slovakia) Lukas Vaclavik	(Czech Republic) Tadeas Vaclavik	(Bulgaria) Deyan Mihaylov	
2025	(Bulgaria) Deyan Mihaylov	(Spain) André Zapata	(United Kingdom) Arin Yorke	

=== Women's singles ===
Year	Gold	Silver	Bronze	Ref.
1992	(Croatia) Ana Ivančič	(Slovenia) Petra Klesnik		
1993	(Japan) Hanae Yokoya			
1994	(Japan) Masayo Oishi			
1995	(France) Fanny Cagnard	(Japan) Aiko Suvama	(France) Ludvine Kusior	
1996	(France) Gwenaëlle Jullien	(Germany) Veronika Dytrt	(Japan) Masayo Oishi	
1997	(Japan) Kumiko Taneda	(Japan) Utako Wakamatsu	(Canada) Stefanie Partridge	
1998	(Finland) Elina Kettunen	(Russia) Irina Nikolaeva	(Germany) Andrea Diewald	
1999	(Finland) Elina Kettunen	(Japan) Akiko Suzuki	(Japan) Utako Wakamatsu	
2000	(United States) Kathryn Orscher	(United States) Colette Irving	(Croatia) Idora Hegel	
2001	(United States) Alissa Czisny	(United States) Kelsey Drewel	(Canada) Miyoko Ohtake	
2002	(Canada) Signe Ronka	(United States) Yebin Mok	(United States) Jennifer Don	
2003	(Russia) Lilia Biktagirova	(Switzerland) Myriam Flühmann	(United States) Jane Bugaeva	
2004	(United States) Danielle Shepard	(Russia) Katarina Gerboldt	(Sweden) Amanda Nylander	
2005	(United States) Katrina Hacker	(Russia) Katarina Gerboldt	(United States) Megan Hyatt	
2006	(United States) Ashley Wagner	(Canada) Kathryn Kang	(France) Charlotte Gendreau	
2007	(France) Graziella Trevise	(Denmark) Karina Sinding Johnson	(Turkey) Birce Atabey	
2008	(United States) Victoria Hecht	(Slovakia) Alexandra Kunova	(Slovenia) Nika Ceric	
2009	(Sweden) Rebecka Emanuelsson	(Italy) Amelia Schwienbacher	(Slovenia) Daša Grm	
2010	(Turkey) Sıla Saygı	(Norway) Camilla Gjersem	(Norway) Celine Mysen	
2011	(France) Laurine Lecavelier	(Italy) Agnese Garlisi	(Italy) Martina Zola	
2012	(France) Bahia Taleb	(Germany) Anneli Kawelke	(France) Lauriane Cirilli	
2013	(Russia) Elena Radionova	(Japan) Yura Matsuda	(Finland) Krista Pitkäniemi	
2014	(Kazakhstan) Elizabet Tursynbayeva	(South Korea) Lim Ah-hyun	(Germany) Alissa Scheidt	
2015	(South Korea) Choi Da-bin	(Italy) Giulia Foresti	(Italy) Martina Manzo	
2016	(Germany) Tina Helleken	(Italy) Sara Conti	(United States) Alice Yang	
2017	(Russia) Elizaveta Nugumanova	(Russia) Sofia Samodurova	(Germany) Paula Mikolajczyk	
2018	(Austria) Olga Mikutina	(Italy) Lara Naki Gutmann	(Hungary) Júlia Láng	
2019	(Austria) Stefanie Pesendorfer	(Italy) Federica Grandesso	(Italy) Serena Joy Roblin	
2020–21	Cancelled due to the COVID-19 pandemic			
2022	(Italy) Irina Napolitano	(Denmark) Babeth Hansson-Östergaard	(Slovenia) Manca Krmelj	
2023	(Japan) Mao Shimada	(Japan) Haruna Murakami	(Switzerland) Sara Franzi	
2024	(Italy) Sarina Joos	(Switzerland) Chiara Schöll	(Slovakia) Olívia Lengyelová	
2025	(Cyprus) Stefania Yakovleva	(Italy) Chiara Minighini	(Austria) Hannah Frank	

=== Pairs ===
Year	Gold	Silver	Bronze	Ref.
1999	(France); Catherine Hue; Roland Vivien	No other competitors		
2000	(United States); Sima Ganaba; Amir Ganaba	(United States); Kristen Roth; Michael McPherson	(United States); Alicia Heelan; Eric Leser	
2001	(United States); Jaqueline Jimenez; Themistocles Leftheris	(United States); Brittany Vise; Nicholas Kole	(France); Lucie Stadelman; Yannick Bonheur	
2002	(Russia); Anastasia Kuzmina; Stanislav Evdokimov	(United States); Amy Howerton; Steven Pottenger	(United States); Christie Baca; Scott Smith	
2003	(Russia); Arina Ushakova; Alexander Popov	(Canada); Michelle Cronin; Brian Shales	(United States); Amy Howerton; Steven Pottenger	
2004	(United States); Mariel Miller; Rockne Brubaker	(Canada); Michelle Gorczyca; Robert Luciani	(United States); Lindsey Seitz; Andy Seitz	
2005	(United States); Claire Davis; Nathan Miller	(United States); Bianca Butler; Joseph Jacobsen	(Canada); Becky Cosford; Christopher Richardson	
