= 2024 NHK Trophy =

Figure skating competition

- Type: Grand Prix
- Date: November 8 – 10
- Season: 2024–25
- Location: Tokyo, Japan
- Host: Japan Skating Federation
- Venue: Yoyogi National Gymnasium

Champions
- Men's singles: (Japan) Yuma Kagiyama
- Women's singles: (Japan) Kaori Sakamoto
- Pairs: (Georgia (country)) Anastasiia Metelkina and Luka Berulava
- Ice dance: (United States) Madison Chock and Evan Bates
- Previous: 2023 NHK Trophy
- Next: 2025 NHK Trophy
- Previous Grand Prix: 2024 Grand Prix de France
- Next Grand Prix: 2024 Finlandia Trophy

The 2024 NHK Trophy was the fourth event of the 2024–25 ISU Grand Prix of Figure Skating: a senior-level international invitational competition series. It was held at the Yoyogi National Gymnasium in Tokyo, Japan, from November 8–10. Medals were awarded in men's singles, women's singles, pair skating, and ice dance. Skaters also earned points toward qualifying for the 2024–25 Grand Prix Final.

== Entries ==
The International Skating Union announced the preliminary assignments on June 9, 2024.

Country	Men	Women	Pairs	Ice dance
Austria	—N/a	Olga Mikutina	—N/a	
Azerbaijan	Vladimir Litvintsev	—N/a		
Estonia	—N/a	Niina Petrõkina	—N/a	
Finland	—N/a			Yuka Orihara; Juho Pirinen
France	—N/a			Loïcia Demougeot; Théo le Mercier
France	—N/a			Marie Dupayage; Thomas Nabais
Georgia	—N/a		Anastasiia Metelkina; Luka Berulava	—N/a
Germany	—N/a		Annika Hocke; Robert Kunkel	Jennifer Janse van Rensburg; Benjamin Steffan
Great Britain	—N/a		Anastasia Vaipan-Law; Luke Digby	—N/a
Israel	Mark Gorodnitsky	—N/a		
Italy	Gabriele Frangipani	Lara Naki Gutmann	—N/a	
Italy	Daniel Grassl	—N/a	—N/a	
Italy	Matteo Rizzo	—N/a	—N/a	
Japan	Yuma Kagiyama	Yuna Aoki	Riku Miura; Ryuichi Kihara	Azusa Tanaka; Shingo Nishiyama
Japan	Kao Miura	Mone Chiba	Yuna Nagaoka; Sumitada Moriguchi	Utana Yoshida; Masaya Morita
Japan	Tatsuya Tsuboi	Kaori Sakamoto	—N/a	
Lithuania	—N/a			Allison Reed; Saulius Ambrulevičius
Netherlands	—N/a		Daria Danilova; Michel Tsiba	—N/a
Poland	—N/a	Ekaterina Kurakova	—N/a	
South Korea	Lim Ju-heon	Kim Ye-lim	—N/a	
South Korea	—N/a	Wi Seo-yeong	—N/a	
United States	Jason Brown	Alysa Liu	Ellie Kam; Daniel O'Shea	Christina Carreira; Anthony Ponomarenko
United States	Tomoki Hiwatashi	Bradie Tennell	Isabelle Martins; Ryan Bedard	Madison Chock; Evan Bates
United States	Andrew Torgashev	Lindsay Thorngren	—N/a	Caroline Green; Michael Parsons

=== Changes to preliminary entries ===
Discipline	Withdrew		Added		Notes	Ref.
Discipline	Date	Skater(s)	Date	Skater(s)	Notes	Ref.
Men	August 5	(Slovakia); Adam Hagara	August 6	(Italy); Daniel Grassl	Hagara to remain on the Junior Grand Prix circuit	
Pairs	—N/a		August 9	(Netherlands); Daria Danilova; Michel Tsiba	Host picks	
Women	September 3	(South Korea); Lee Hae-in	September 10	(Austria); Olga Mikutina	Suspension (Lee)	
Men	—N/a		September 5	(Japan); Tatsuya Tsuboi	Host picks	
Women	—N/a		September 5	(Japan); Yuna Aoki	Host picks	
Ice dance	October 3	(Canada); Laurence Fournier Beaudry; Nikolaj Sørensen	October 8	(France); Marie Dupayage; Thomas Nabais	Suspension (Sørensen)	
Pairs	October 15	(United States); Valentina Plazas; Maximiliano Fernandez	October 16	(United Kingdom); Anastasia Vaipan-Law; Luke Digby	Injury	
Pairs	October 30	(Italy); Lucrezia Beccari; Matteo Guarise	October 31	(Philippines); Isabella Gamez; Aleksandr Korovin	Foot issues (Beccari)	
Pairs	November 1	(Philippines); Isabella Gamez; Aleksandr Korovin	November 1	(United States); Isabelle Martins; Ryan Bedard	Visa issues	
Men	November 4	(Canada); Stephen Gogolev	November 4	(United States); Andrew Torgashev		

== Results ==
=== Men's singles ===
Men's results
Rank	Skater	Nation	Total points	SP		FS	
1st place, gold medalist(s)	Yuma Kagiyama	Japan	300.09	1	105.70	1	194.39
2nd place, silver medalist(s)	Daniel Grassl	Italy	264.85	5	83.01	2	181.84
3rd place, bronze medalist(s)	Tatsuya Tsuboi	Japan	251.52	3	85.02	3	166.50
4	Andrew Torgashev	United States	246.58	4	84.36	5	162.22
5	Matteo Rizzo	Italy	246.56	7	81.79	4	164.77
6	Kao Miura	Japan	240.38	2	102.96	11	137.42
7	Jason Brown	United States	229.09	10	77.08	6	152.01
8	Tomoki Hiwatashi	United States	226.38	11	74.59	7	151.79
9	Vladimir Litvintsev	Azerbaijan	225.67	6	81.85	8	143.82
10	Gabriele Frangipani	Italy	223.82	8	81.33	9	142.49
11	Mark Gorodnitsky	Israel	215.76	9	77.74	10	138.02
12	Lim Ju-heon	South Korea	196.05	12	74.31	12	121.74

=== Women's singles ===
Women's results
Rank	Skater	Nation	Total points	SP		FS	
1st place, gold medalist(s)	Kaori Sakamoto	Japan	231.88	1	78.93	1	152.95
2nd place, silver medalist(s)	Mone Chiba	Japan	212.54	2	71.69	2	140.85
3rd place, bronze medalist(s)	Yuna Aoki	Japan	195.07	3	69.78	5	125.29
4	Alysa Liu	United States	190.75	4	65.03	4	125.72
5	Bradie Tennell	United States	190.25	5	62.05	3	128.20
6	Lara Naki Gutmann	Italy	180.28	6	61.51	6	118.77
7	Wi Seo-yeong	South Korea	173.77	7	61.43	9	112.34
8	Olga Mikutina	Austria	169.93	8	60.94	10	108.99
9	Lindsay Thorngren	United States	169.93	10	54.79	7	114.24
10	Niina Petrõkina	Estonia	165.84	11	52.98	8	112.86
11	Ekaterina Kurakova	Poland	157.14	9	56.46	12	100.68
12	Kim Ye-lim	South Korea	152.84	12	51.32	11	101.52

=== Pairs ===
Pairs' results
Rank	Team	Nation	Total points	SP		FS	
1st place, gold medalist(s)	Anastasiia Metelkina; Luka Berulava	Georgia	213.05	2	70.28	1	142.77
2nd place, silver medalist(s)	Riku Miura; Ryuichi Kihara	Japan	209.45	1	71.90	2	137.55
3rd place, bronze medalist(s)	Ellie Kam; Daniel O'Shea	United States	197.44	3	69.15	3	128.29
4	Annika Hocke; Robert Kunkel	Germany	188.54	4	67.37	4	121.17
5	Daria Danilova; Michel Tsiba	Netherlands	178.37	6	58.90	5	119.47
6	Anastasia Vaipan-Law; Luke Digby	Great Britain	174.45	7	58.17	6	116.28
7	Yuna Nagaoka; Sumitada Moriguchi	Japan	172.47	5	60.32	7	112.15
8	Isabelle Martins; Ryan Bedard	United States	140.63	8	48.95	8	91.68

=== Ice dance ===
Ice dance results
Rank	Team	Nation	Total points	RD		FD	
1st place, gold medalist(s)	Madison Chock; Evan Bates	United States	215.95	1	86.32	1	129.63
2nd place, silver medalist(s)	Christina Carreira; Anthony Ponomarenko	United States	198.97	2	79.64	2	119.33
3rd place, bronze medalist(s)	Allison Reed; Saulius Ambrulevičius	Lithuania	195.52	3	77.91	3	117.61
4	Caroline Green; Michael Parsons	United States	188.76	4	74.38	4	114.38
5	Loïcia Demougeot; Théo le Mercier	France	178.30	5	69.24	5	109.06
6	Yuka Orihara; Juho Pirinen	Finland	175.28	7	67.34	6	107.94
7	Jennifer Janse van Rensburg; Benjamin Steffan	Germany	173.36	6	68.82	7	104.54
8	Marie Dupayage; Thomas Nabais	France	165.80	8	64.52	8	101.28
9	Utana Yoshida; Masaya Morita	Japan	161.36	9	64.30	9	97.06
10	Azusa Tanaka; Shingo Nishiyama	Japan	151.27	10	59.15	10	92.12
