= Yuna Aoki =

Japanese figure skater (born 2002)

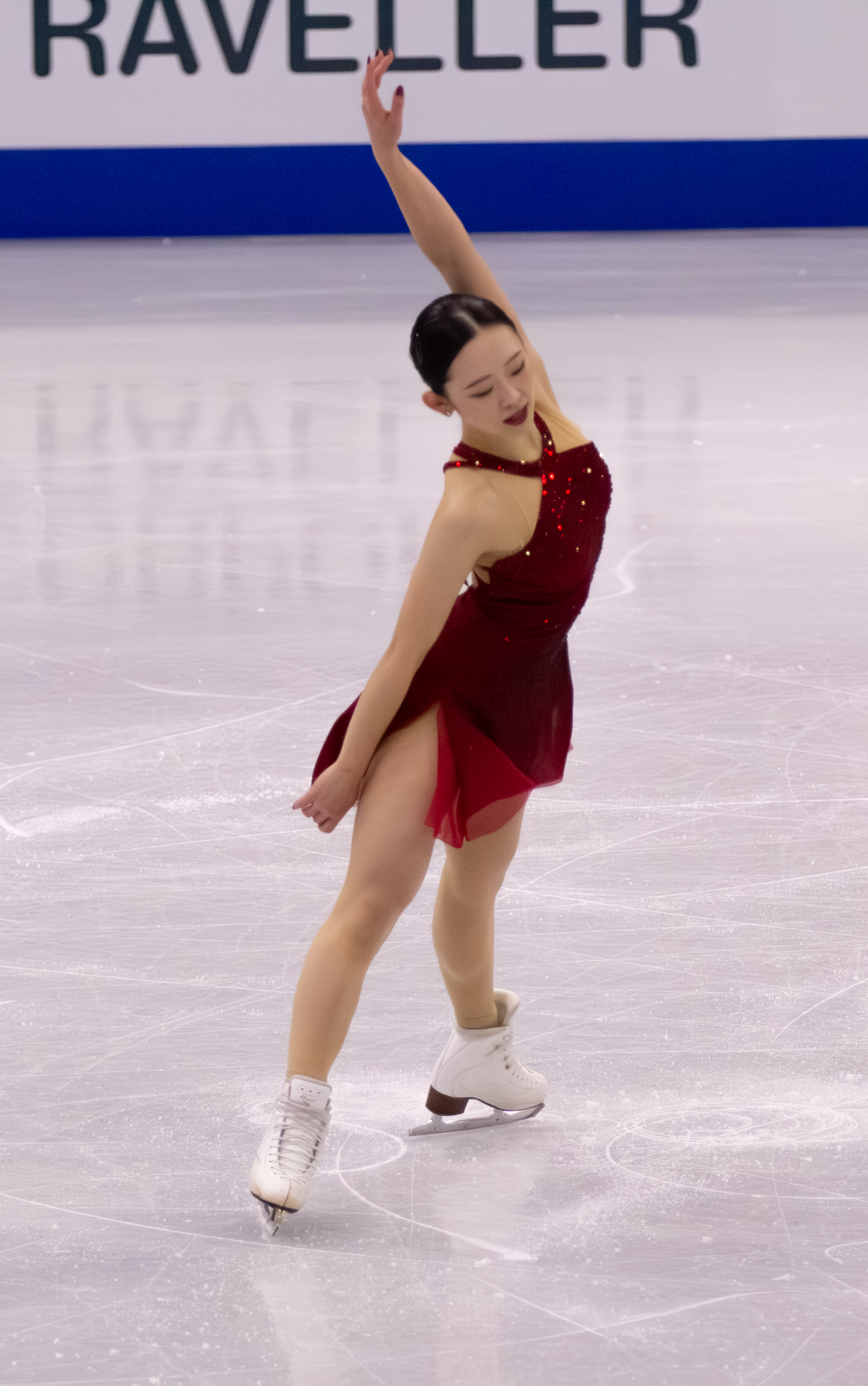
- Yuna Aoki at 2025 Skate Canada International

Personal information
- Native name: 青木 祐奈
- Born: 10 January 2002 (age 24) Yokohama, Japan
- Height: 1.56 m (5 ft 1 1/2 in)

Figure skating career
- Country: Japan
- Coach: Kensuke Nakaniwa; Makoto Nakata; Momoe Naguma; Aya Tanoue; Niina Takeno
- Skating club: MF Academy
- Began skating: 2007

Medal record
Four Continents Championships
Gold medal – first place	2026 Beijing	Singles

Yuna Aoki (Japanese: 青木祐奈 born 10 January 2002) is a Japanese competitive figure skater. She is the 2026 Four Continents champion, the 2024 NHK Trophy bronze medalist, the 2019 Bavarian Open silver medalist, the 2023 Triglav Trophy silver medalist, and the 2024 Challenge Cup silver medalist.

== Personal life ==
Aoki was born on January 10, 2002, in Yokohama, Japan. She graduated from Nihon University in 2024, where she earned a degree in the School of Sports Sciences.

Aoki has expressed interest in becoming a choreographer after finishing her competitive skating career.

== Career ==
=== Early career ===
Aoki started skating at age five after being inspired by Shizuka Arakawa's 2006 Olympic victory. Shoichiro Tsuzuki would begin coaching her at the age of six.

As an advanced novice skater, Aoki won the silver medal at the 2013–14 Japanese Novice Championships and went on to place fifteenth at the Japan Junior Championships. The following season, she won the 2024–15 Japan Novice Championships before placing fifth at the 2014–15 Japan Junior Championships. During the 2015 World Team Trophy, Aoki was invited to perform in the gala.

=== 2015–16 season: Junior debut and injury ===
Shortly before the 2015–16 season, Aoki developed spondylolysis following a hard fall on a triple axel attempt in practice. This injury greatly hindered her training. Looking back on this injury, Aoki stated, "It first took a year for my spine to separate, and then another year after that. It hurt when I was skating, and even moving back and forth in my daily life hurt. Jumping hurt, and spins and other movements that require a lot of bending are a strain on my body." She further detailed how her parents tried encouraging her to quit skating due to how much pain she was in but Aoki persisted onwards due to her love for the sport.

In spite of this, Aoki debuted on the ISU Junior Grand Prix circuit, placing seventh at 2015 JGP Latvia. She would then go on to finish seventh at the 2015–16 Japanese Junior Championships and sixteenth at the senior championships.

=== 2016–17 season ===
Competing on the Junior Grand Prix series for a second time, Aoki finished fourth at 2016 JGP Czech Republic and fifth at 2016 JGP Germany. She then ended the season by finishing ninth at the 2016–17 Japanese Junior Championships.

=== 2018–19, 2019–2020, & 2020–21 seasons: Struggles and injury ===
Aoki began the season by finishing seventh at 2018 JGP Canada. She then placed fifth at the Japan Junior Championships and fourteenth at the senior event. Aoki went on to make her senior international debut at the 2019 Bavarian Open, where she won the silver medal.

Following the season, Aoki injured her left ankle and required surgery to treat it. This would cause her to miss the whole 2019–20 season. She would return to competition during the subsequent season and finished nineteenth at the 2020–21 Japan Championships.

Competing at the 2021–22 Japan Championships the following year, Aoki placed thirtieth in the short program and did not advance to the free skate. She would later describe this to be a dark point in her life and had deliberated on whether or not she should continue skating. "Looking back, after going through a long and difficult period," Aoki later stated, "There were many times when I thought about quitting skating. I have had the support of many people and I have always loved skating. Figure skating is an indispensable part of me. I feel most confident on the ice."

Upon deciding that she wanted to continue competing, Aoki decided that she was in need of a fresh start. In April 2022, she moved from her hometown of Yokohama to Chiba so she could train under Kensuke Nakaniwa, Makoto Nakata, Momoe Naguma, and Aya Tanoue at the MF Skating Academy.

=== 2022–23 season ===
At the Japan Championships, Aoki placed tenth in the short program and sixth in the free skate, finishing in seventh place overall. This was her first time finishing in the top ten at the senior national championships.

She then competed at the 2023 Triglav Trophy, where she won the silver medal behind Hana Yoshida.

=== 2023–24 season ===
Aoki was invited to make her Grand Prix debut at the 2023 NHK Trophy, where she placed eighth in the short program after receiving three underrotation calls on jumps, though she observed that despite this she landed them "comfortably." In the free skate she received only one quarter underrotation call, placing fifth in that segment and rising to fifth place overall. Aoki said she was "very happy to have been able to show my personal skating skills without mistakes on such a big stage."

She went on to finish ninth at the 2023–24 Japan Championships, before closing her season with a silver medal win at the 2024 Challenge Cup.

Aoki originally intended to retire at the end of the season, in conjunction with graduating from university. However, due to her experience at the NHK Trophy, along with encouragement from Kanako Murakami and Kana Muramoto, she decided to continue competitive skating.

=== 2024–25 season: First Grand Prix medal ===
Beginning her season on the 2024–25 Grand Prix series, Aoki finished seventh at 2024 Skate America. She then competed at the 2024 NHK Trophy as the host pick, where she gained a new personal best short program score by over eleven points, with 69.78. Aoki finished fifth in the free skate segment, but her lead from the short program put her third overall with a new personal best total score of 195.07. She won her first Grand Prix medal, and she rounded out a Japanese women's podium sweep at the competition alongside Kaori Sakamoto and Mone Chiba. Following the event, Aoki expressed elation at the result, saying, "I competed in the Junior Grand Prix but I never stood on the podium. So at this age, just standing on the podium, I'm so grateful for it. I'm so glad that I kept on going." Chloe Flower, the composer of Aoki's free program music, also took to her Instagram, where she praised Aoki's performance and thanked her for "bringing life to my song."

In October 2024, Aoki collaborated with Olympic champion Shizuka Arakawa, Olympic bronze medalist Daisuke Takahashi, Kana Muramoto, Takahito Mura, Kazuki Tomono, Keiji Tanaka, Kosho Oshima, Yuto Kishina and Rena Uezono to launch the members-only official fan community F-Ske on the platform FANICON.

Going on to compete at the 2024–25 Japan Championships in December, Aoki finished the event in twelfth place. She again considered ending her competitive career. Aoki said that she both wanted to clear away the disappointment of her low placement and felt afraid of once more experiencing the pressure and distress of working hard without producing a good result. She said that what made her decide to continue was her coach, Kensuke Nakaniwa, telling her that he wanted to see her perform again.

=== 2025–26 season: Four Continents champion ===
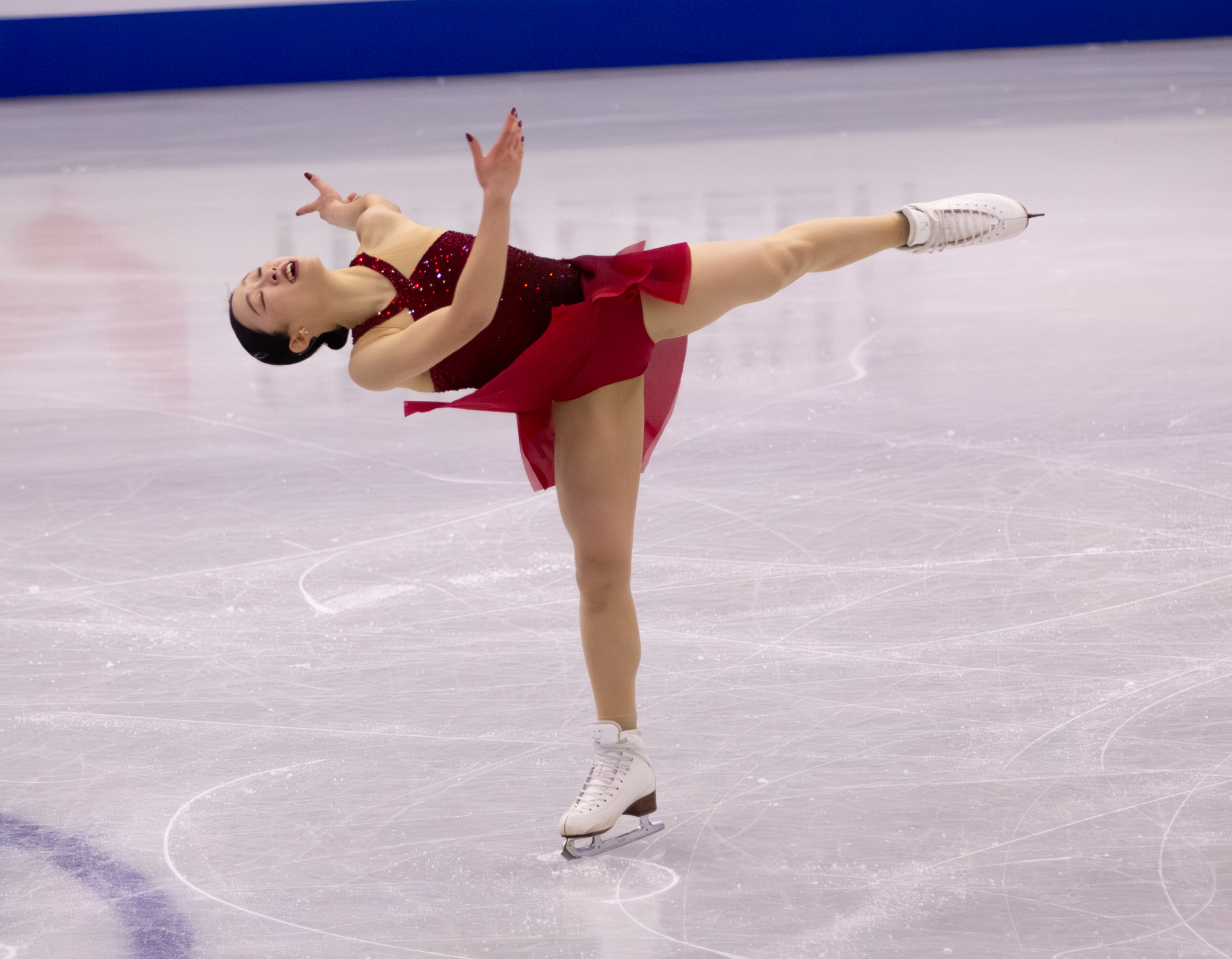
Aoki performing an upright camel spin at 2025 Skate Canada

During the off-season, Aoki elected to use music from the La La Land soundtrack for her free skate. During the choreographic process, she worked with Chelsea Thedinga, one of the film's backup dancers.

Aoki opened the season by competing on the 2025–26 Grand Prix series, finishing sixth at 2025 Skate Canada International and at the 2025 NHK Trophy.

At the 2025–26 Japan Championships, Aoki placed fifth, a personal best for her at the Japan Championships. She finished third in the free skate segment, where she successfully landed a difficult triple Lutz jump-triple loop jump combination. She was subsequently assigned to the 2026 Four Continents Championships, her first ISU championship assignment. She was also named as the second alternate for the 2026 Winter Olympic team.

The following month, Aoki won the women's title at the 2026 Four Continents Championships, her first ever senior championship appearance. She set new ISU personal best scores in both the short program and free skate, beating her previous personal best total score from the 2024 NHK Trophy by over 20 points and defeating Olympic team members Ami Nakai and Mone Chiba. About the result, she said, "I haven't really thought that I would medal and this result would come. It hasn't really sunk in. I'm very grateful and happy about the result. I'm happy to achieve my personal best today. I feel like the results that I had was what I've been building on." This was her first senior international win and her first international win in over ten years, her last gold medal being on the junior level at the 2015 Asian Trophy.

=== 2026–27 season ===
Aoki opened her season at the 2026 Kinoshita Group Cup, where she finished in 7th place overall.

Aoki went onto compete on the 2026–27 Grand Prix series. Competing at the 2026 Grand Prix de France, Aoki finished the short program segment in first place, later dropping to fourth overall following the free skate after she doubled two Lutz jumps and fell on a double toeloop. "I honestly don't know what to say right now. I wasn't particularly affected by the pressure of skating last. I didn't look at anyone else's results and just focused on myself. I was excited to see what I could do, and I felt a good kind of nervousness before the performance. My coach and I even talked about how good my mindset was, so I'm not sure what went wrong."

== Programs ==
Season	Short program	Free skating	Exhibition
2026–2027	Can't Take My Eyes Off You by Frankie Valli performed by Boys Town Gang choreo. by Kaitlyn Weaver	Cirque du Soleil; Desert (from O) by Benoît Jutras; Pageant; Love Dance (from Kà) by René Dupéré choreo. by Shae-Lynn Bourne	Smile by Nana Mouskouri
2026–2027	Can't Take My Eyes Off You by Frankie Valli performed by Boys Town Gang choreo. by Kaitlyn Weaver	Cirque du Soleil; Desert (from O) by Benoît Jutras; Pageant; Love Dance (from Kà) by René Dupéré choreo. by Shae-Lynn Bourne	Beware.. The South London Lover Boy by Raye choreo. by Yuna Aoki
2025–2026	Adiós Nonino by Astor Piazzolla performed by Héctor Ulises Passarella, Orchestra dell'Accademia Nazionale di Santa Cecilia, Myung-whun Chung, & Luis Bacalov choreo. by Misha Ge	La La Land; Mia & Sebastian's Theme; Epilogue; Audition (The Fools Who Dream); Someone in the Crowd by Justin Hurwitz performed by Emma Stone choreo. by Alexander Johnson, Chelsea Thedinga	Regret by Will Reagan; Take Me Home by Jess Glynne; Where Is My Husband! by Raye; Miss Me Too (Piano Version) by Griff; like you're god (AWAY Remix) by mehro & AWAY
2024–2025	Adiós Nonino by Astor Piazzolla performed by Héctor Ulises Passarella, Orchestra dell'Accademia Nazionale di Santa Cecilia, Myung-whun Chung, & Luis Bacalov choreo. by Misha Ge	Popsical by Chloe Flower choreo. by Misha Ge	like you're god (AWAY Remix) by mehro & AWAY; Glimpse of Us by Joji performed by emlyn choreo. by Yuna Aoki
2023–2024	Young and Beautiful (from The Great Gatsby) by Lana Del Rey choreo. by Yuna Aoki	She by Evgeny Khmara choreo. by Misha Ge	Better Man by Ellie Goulding; The Artist by Ludovic Bource choreo. by Akiko Suzuki
2022–2023	Byakuya wo Iku (from Byakuyakō) by Shin Kono choreo. by Akiko Suzuki	Violin Concerto No. 4 in D Minor by Niccolò Paganini; Io Ti Penso Amore by David Garrett & Nicole Scherzinger choreo. by Misha Ge	
2021–2022	The Artist by Ludovic Bource choreo. by Akiko Suzuki	Beethoven's 5 Secrets by The Piano Guys choreo. by Misha Ge	
2020–2021	Live For The One I Love by Celine Dion choreo. by Stéphane Lambiel	Beethoven's 5 Secrets by The Piano Guys choreo. by Misha Ge	
2019–20	Did not compete this season		
2018–2019	East of Eden by Charles Gerhadt & Lee Holdridge choreo. by Nakako Tsuzuki	Piano Concerto in A minor by Edvard Grieg choreo. by Nakako Tsuzuki	
2016–2017	Méditation (from Thaïs) by Jules Massenet choreo. by Nakako Tsuzuki	On My Own (from Les Misérables) performed by Lea Salonga choreo. by Stéphane Lambiel, Michel Shanonn	
2015–2016	Méditation (from Thaïs) by Jules Massenet choreo. by Nakako Tsuzuki	Piano Concerto No. 2 by Sergei Rachmaninoff choreo. by Nakako Tsuzuki	
2014–2015	Fantaisie-Impromptu by Frédéric Chopin	Scheherazade by Nikolai Rimsky-Korsakov	For the First Time in Forever (from Frozen) by Kristen Bell & Idina Menzel

== Competitive highlights ==
- GP – Event of the ISU Grand Prix Series
- JGP – Event of the ISU Junior Grand Prix Series
- TBD – Assigned

Competition placements at senior level
Season	2015–16	2018–19	2020–21	2021–22	2022–23	2023–24	2024–25	2025–26	2026–27
Four Continents Championships								1st	
Japan Championships	16th	14th	19th	30th	7th	9th	12th	5th	
GP France									4th
GP NHK Trophy						5th	3rd	6th	TBD
GP Skate America							7th		
GP Skate Canada								6th	
CS Kinoshita Group Cup									7th
Challenge Cup						2nd			
Triglav Trophy					2nd				
Bavarian Open	2nd								

Competition placements at junior level
Season	2012–13	2013–14	2014–15	2015–16	2016–17	2017–18	2018–19
Japan Championships	15th	5th	7th	9th	17th	5th	
JGP Canada							7th
JGP Czech Republic					4th		
JGP Germany					5th		
JGP Latvia				7th			
Asian Open Trophy				1st			
Bavarian Open				2nd			

== Detailed results ==
ISU personal best scores in the +5/-5 GOE System
Segment	Type	Score	Event
Total	**TSS**	**217.39**	2026 Four Continents Championships
Short program	**TSS**	**76.31**	2026 Grand Prix de France
Short program	TES	41.68	2026 Grand Prix de France
Short program	PCS	34.63	2026 Grand Prix de France
Free skating	**TSS**	**145.98**	2026 Four Continents Championships
Free skating	TES	74.82	2026 Four Continents Championships
Free skating	PCS	71.16	2026 Four Continents Championships

ISU personal best scores in the +3/-3 GOE System
Segment	Type	Score	Event
Total	**TSS**	**169.60**	2016 JGP Germany
Short program	**TSS**	**56.67**	2015 JGP Latvia
Short program	TES	32.04	2015 JGP Latvia
Short program	PCS	26.37	2016 JGP Germany
Free skating	**TSS**	**113.13**	2016 JGP Germany
Free skating	TES	61.07	2016 JGP Germany
Free skating	PCS	54.06	2016 JGP Germany

Small medals for short and free programs awarded only at ISU Championships. At team events, medals are awarded for team results only. Bolded scores reflect an ISU personal best.

=== Senior level ===
Results in the 2026-27 season
Date	Event	SP		FS		Total	
Date	Event	P	Score	P	Score	P	Score
Sep 4–6, 2026	(Japan) 2026 CS Kinoshita Group Cup	8	58.61	7	123.18	7	181.79
Oct 23-25, 2026	2026 Grand Prix de France	1	**76.31**	5	124.31	4	200.62

Results in the 2025–26 season
Date	Event	SP		FS		Total	
Date	Event	P	Score	P	Score	P	Score
Oct 31 – Nov 2, 2025	2025 Skate Canada International	6	64.58	6	118.27	6	182.85
Nov 7–9, 2025	(Japan) 2025 NHK Trophy	9	56.72	5	126.59	6	183.31
Dec 18–21, 2025	2025–26 Japan Championships	7	69.84	3	142.16	5	212.00
Jan 21–25, 2026	(China) 2026 Four Continents Championships	2	71.41	1	**145.98**	1	**217.39**

Results in the 2024–25 season
Date	Event	SP		FS		Total	
Date	Event	P	Score	P	Score	P	Score
Oct 18–20, 2024	(United States) 2024 Skate America	10	56.51	4	126.52	7	183.03
Nov 8–10, 2024	(Japan) 2024 NHK Trophy	3	69.78	5	125.29	3	195.07
Dec 19–22, 2024	2024–25 Japan Championships	6	70.07	14	124.00	12	194.07

2023–2024 season
Date	Event	SP	FS	Total
February 22–25, 2024	2024 Challenge Cup	1; 72.01	2; 137.36	2; 209.37
December 20–24, 2023	2023–24 Japan Championships	11; 61.44	8; 130.57	9; 192.01
November 24–26, 2023	2023 NHK Trophy	8; 58.28	5; 126.18	5; 184.46
2022–23 season
Date	Event	SP	FS	Total
April 12–16, 2023	2023 Triglav Trophy	2; 57.22	2; 128.70	2; 185.92
December 21–25, 2022	2022–23 Japan Championships	10; 62.48	6; 129.41	7; 191.89
2021–22 season
Date	Event	SP	FS	Total
December 22–26, 2021	2021–22 Japan Championships	30; 46.90	–	30; 46.90
2020–21 season
Date	Event	SP	FS	Total
December 24–27, 2020	2020–21 Japan Championships	14; 59.97	21; 98.27	19; 158.24
2018–19 season
Date	Event	SP	FS	Total
February 5–10, 2019	2019 Bavarian Open	1; 68.43	2; 114.47	2; 182.90
December 20–24, 2018	2018–19 Japan Championships	8; 63.72	17; 105.56	14; 169.28
2015–16 season
Date	Event	SP	FS	Total
December 24–27, 2015	2015–16 Japan Championships	9; 58.96	18; 96.88	16; 155.84

=== Junior and novice level ===
2018–19 season
Date	Event	SP	FS	Total
November 23–25, 2018	2018–19 Japan Junior Championships	4; 55.23	6; 102.11	5; 157.34
September 12–15, 2018	2018 JGP Canada	8; 54.81	7; 99.43	7; 154.24
2017–18 season
Date	Event	SP	FS	Total
November 23–25, 2017	2017–18 Japan Junior Championships	17; 51.27	16; 94.93	17; 146.20
2016–17 season
Date	Event	SP	FS	Total
November 18–20, 2016	2016–17 Japan Junior Championships	8; 53.72	9; 104.55	9; 161.35
September 28–October 2, 2016	2016 JGP Germany	5; 56.47	3; 113.13	5; 169.60
September 1–4, 2016	2016 JGP Czech Republic	4; 56.60	4; 99.19	4; 155.79
2015–16 season
Date	Event	SP	FS	Total
February 17–21, 2016	2016 Bavarian Open	2; 62.84	3; 85.38	2; 148.22
November 21–23, 2015	2015–16 Japan Junior Championships	10; 52.96	8; 109.51	7; 162.47
August 26–30, 2015	2015 JGP Latvia	5; 56.67	10; 89.56	7; 146.23
August 5–8, 2015	2015 Asian Open Trophy	2; 44.49	1; 89.99	1; 134.48
2014–15 season
Date	Event	SP	FS	Total
November 22–24, 2014	2014–15 Japan Junior Championships	3; 60.37	6; 103.31	5; 163.68
2013–14 season
Date	Event	SP	FS	Total
November 22–24, 2013	2013–14 Japan Junior Championships	5; 50.03	18; 84.13	15; 134.16
