= 2024–25 ISU Grand Prix of Figure Skating =

Figure skating competition

2024-25 ISU Grand Prix of Figure Skating
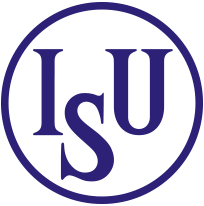
- Type: Grand Prix
- Date: October 18 – December 8, 2024
- Season: 2024–25
- Previous: 2023–24 Grand Prix
- Next: 2025–26 Grand Prix

The 2024–25 ISU Grand Prix of Figure Skating was a series of senior international competitions organized by the International Skating Union that were held from October 2024 through December 2024. Medals were awarded in men's singles, women's singles, pair skating, and ice dance. Skaters earned points based on their placements at each event and the top six in each discipline qualified to compete at the Grand Prix Final in Grenoble, France. The corresponding series for junior-level skaters was the 2024–25 ISU Junior Grand Prix.

== Competitions ==
The Grand Prix Final was originally to be held in Orléans, France, but the French Federation of Ice Sports chose to relocate the event to Grenoble. This series included the following events.

2024–25 Grand Prix competitions
Date	Event	Location	Ref.
October 18–20	(United States) 2024 Skate America	Allen, Texas, United States	
October 25–27	2024 Skate Canada International	Halifax, Nova Scotia, Canada	
November 1–3	2024 Grand Prix de France	Angers, France	
November 8–10	(Japan) 2024 NHK Trophy	Tokyo, Japan	
November 15–17	(Finland) 2024 Finlandia Trophy	Helsinki, Finland	
November 22–24	2024 Cup of China	Chongqing, China	
December 5–8	(France) 2024–25 Grand Prix Final	Grenoble, France	

== Requirements ==
Skaters were eligible to compete on the senior Grand Prix circuit if they reached the age of 17 before July 1, 2024. They were also required to have earned a minimum total score at certain international events.

== Assignments ==
The International Skating Union announced the preliminary assignments on June 9, 2024.

=== Men's singles ===
Men's assignments
Nation	Skater	Assignment(s)	
Azerbaijan	Vladimir Litvintsev	Skate Canada International	NHK Trophy
Canada	Wesley Chiu	Skate America	Cup of China
China	Jin Boyang	Grand Prix de France	Cup of China
Estonia	Aleksandr Selevko	Grand Prix de France	Finlandia Trophy
France	Kévin Aymoz	Skate America	Finlandia Trophy
France	Luc Economides	Skate Canada International	Grand Prix de France
France	François Pitot	Skate America	Grand Prix de France
France	Adam Siao Him Fa	Grand Prix de France	Cup of China
Georgia	Nika Egadze	Skate America	Cup of China
Israel	Mark Gorodnitsky	Skate Canada International	NHK Trophy
Italy	Gabriele Frangipani	Skate Canada International	NHK Trophy
Italy	Daniel Grassl	NHK Trophy	Finlandia Trophy
Italy	Nikolaj Memola	Grand Prix de France	Cup of China
Italy	Matteo Rizzo	NHK Trophy	Cup of China
Japan	Yuma Kagiyama	NHK Trophy	Finlandia Trophy
Japan	Kao Miura	Skate America	NHK Trophy
Japan	Shun Sato	Skate Canada International	Cup of China
Japan	Koshiro Shimada	Skate America	Grand Prix de France
Japan	Kazuki Tomono	Grand Prix de France	Finlandia Trophy
Japan	Sōta Yamamoto	Skate Canada International	Finlandia Trophy
Kazakhstan	Mikhail Shaidorov	Grand Prix de France	Cup of China
Latvia	Deniss Vasiļjevs	Skate America	Cup of China
South Korea	Cha Jun-hwan	Skate Canada International	Finlandia Trophy
Switzerland	Lukas Britschgi	Grand Prix de France	Finlandia Trophy
United States	Jason Brown	Skate Canada International	NHK Trophy
United States	Ilia Malinin	Skate America	Skate Canada International
United States	Camden Pulkinen	Grand Prix de France	Finlandia Trophy
United States	Andrew Torgashev	Grand Prix de France	NHK Trophy
Canada	Stephen Gogolev	Skate Canada International	
Canada	Aleksa Rakic	Skate Canada International	
Canada	Roman Sadovsky	Skate Canada International	
China	Chen Yudong	Cup of China	
China	Dai Daiwei	Cup of China	
Finland	Makar Suntsev	Finlandia Trophy	
Finland	Valtter Virtanen	Finlandia Trophy	
Japan	Tatsuya Tsuboi	NHK Trophy	
Japan	Nozomu Yoshioka	Skate America	
Mexico	Donovan Carrillo	Skate America	
Poland	Vladimir Samoilov	Finlandia Trophy	
South Korea	Kim Hyun-gyeom	Cup of China	
South Korea	Lim Ju-heon	NHK Trophy	
United States	Lucas Broussard	Skate America	
United States	Tomoki Hiwatashi	NHK Trophy	
United States	Maxim Naumov	Skate America	

=== Women's singles ===
Women's assignments
Nation	Skater	Assignment(s)	
Austria	Olga Mikutina	Skate America	NHK Trophy
Belgium	Nina Pinzarrone	Skate America	Grand Prix de France
Canada	Madeline Schizas	Skate Canada International	Cup of China
Estonia	Niina Petrõkina	NHK Trophy	Finlandia Trophy
France	Lorine Schild	Grand Prix de France	Finlandia Trophy
France	Léa Serna	Skate America	Grand Prix de France
Georgia	Anastasiia Gubanova	Grand Prix de France	Cup of China
Italy	Lara Naki Gutmann	NHK Trophy	Finlandia Trophy
Japan	Yuna Aoki	Skate America	NHK Trophy
Japan	Mone Chiba	NHK Trophy	Cup of China
Japan	Wakaba Higuchi	Skate America	Grand Prix de France
Japan	Rino Matsuike	Skate Canada International	Finlandia Trophy
Japan	Mai Mihara	Grand Prix de France	Finlandia Trophy
Japan	Kaori Sakamoto	Skate Canada International	NHK Trophy
Japan	Rion Sumiyoshi	Grand Prix de France	Cup of China
Japan	Rinka Watanabe	Skate America	Cup of China
Japan	Hana Yoshida	Skate Canada International	Finlandia Trophy
Poland	Ekaterina Kurakova	Skate Canada International	NHK Trophy
South Korea	Kim Chae-yeon	Grand Prix de France	Cup of China
South Korea	Kim Min-chae	Skate America	Cup of China
South Korea	Kim Ye-lim	Skate Canada International	NHK Trophy
South Korea	Wi Seo-yeong	Skate Canada International	NHK Trophy
Switzerland	Livia Kaiser	Skate America	Grand Prix de France
Switzerland	Kimmy Repond	Skate Canada International	Cup of China
United States	Sarah Everhardt	Grand Prix de France	Finlandia Trophy
United States	Amber Glenn	Grand Prix de France	Cup of China
United States	Elyce Lin-Gracey	Skate America	Skate Canada International
United States	Alysa Liu	Skate Canada International	NHK Trophy
United States	Bradie Tennell	Skate America	NHK Trophy
United States	Lindsay Thorngren	NHK Trophy	Finlandia Trophy
Canada	Sara-Maude Dupuis	Skate Canada International	
Canada	Kaiya Ruiter	Skate Canada International	
China	An Xiangyi	Cup of China	
China	Chen Hongyi	Cup of China	
China	Zhu Yi	Cup of China	
Finland	Janna Jyrkinen	Finlandia Trophy	
Finland	Olivia Lisko	Finlandia Trophy	
Finland	Nella Pelkonen	Finlandia Trophy	
France	Clemence Mayindu	Grand Prix de France	
Latvia	Sofja Stepčenko	Skate America	
South Korea	Yun Ah-sun	Finlandia Trophy	
United States	Isabeau Levito	Skate America	

=== Pairs ===
Pairs' assignments
Nation	Skater	Assignment(s)	
Canada	Kelly Ann Laurin; Loucas Éthier	Skate Canada International	Finlandia Trophy
Canada	Lia Pereira; Trennt Michaud	Grand Prix de France	Cup of China
Canada	Deanna Stellato-Dudek; Maxime Deschamps	Skate Canada International	Finlandia Trophy
Finland	Milania Väänänen; Filippo Clerici	Skate America	Finlandia Trophy
France	Camille Kovalev; Pavel Kovalev	Grand Prix de France	Cup of China
Georgia	Anastasiia Metelkina; Luka Berulava	Skate America	NHK Trophy
Germany	Minerva Fabienne Hase; Nikita Volodin	Grand Prix de France	Cup of China
Germany	Annika Hocke; Robert Kunkel	Skate Canada International	NHK Trophy
Great Britain	Anastasia Vaipan-Law; Luke Digby	Skate America	NHK Trophy
Hungary	Maria Pavlova; Alexei Sviatchenko	Skate America	Finlandia Trophy
Italy	Sara Conti; Niccolò Macii	Grand Prix de France	Cup of China
Italy	Rebecca Ghilardi; Filippo Ambrosini	Grand Prix de France	Finlandia Trophy
Japan	Riku Miura; Ryuichi Kihara	Skate America	NHK Trophy
Japan	Yuna Nagaoka; Sumitada Moriguchi	NHK Trophy	Finlandia Trophy
Netherlands	Daria Danilova; Michel Tsiba	Skate Canada International	NHK Trophy
Poland	Ioulia Chtchetinina; Michał Woźniak	Skate Canada International	NHK Trophy
United States	Emily Chan; Spencer Akira Howe	Skate Canada International	Finlandia Trophy
United States	Alisa Efimova; Misha Mitrofanov	Skate America	Grand Prix de France
United States	Ellie Kam; Daniel O'Shea	Skate America	NHK Trophy
United States	Katie McBeath; Daniil Parkman	Skate America	Cup of China
Uzbekistan	Ekaterina Geynish; Dmitrii Chigirev	Skate Canada International	Grand Prix de France
Australia	Anastasia Golubeva; Hektor Giotopoulos Moore	Skate Canada International	
China	Wang Yuchen; Zhu Lei	Cup of China	
France	Aurélie Faula; Théo Belle	Grand Prix de France	
Philippines	Isabella Gamez; Aleksandr Korovin	Cup of China	
United States	Isabelle Martins; Ryan Bedard	NHK Trophy	
United States	Naomi Williams; Lachlan Lewer	Finlandia Trophy	

=== Ice dance ===
Ice dance assignments
Nation	Skater	Assignment(s)	
Canada	Alicia Fabbri; Paul Ayer	Skate America	Skate Canada International
Canada	Piper Gilles; Paul Poirier	Skate Canada International	Finlandia Trophy
Canada	Marjorie Lajoie; Zachary Lagha	Skate Canada International	Cup of China
Canada	Marie-Jade Lauriault; Romain Le Gac	Skate America	Grand Prix de France
Czech Republic	Kateřina Mrázková; Daniel Mrázek	Skate America	Grand Prix de France
Czech Republic	Natálie Taschlerová; Filip Taschler	Skate Canada International	Finlandia Trophy
Finland	Yuka Orihara; Juho Pirinen	NHK Trophy	Finlandia Trophy
Finland	Juulia Turkkila; Matthias Versluis	Finlandia Trophy	Cup of China
France	Loïcia Demougeot; Théo le Mercier	NHK Trophy	Cup of China
France	Marie Dupayage; Thomas Nabais	Grand Prix de France	NHK Trophy
France	Evgenia Lopareva; Geoffrey Brissaud	Skate Canada International	Grand Prix de France
Georgia	Diana Davis; Gleb Smolkin	Skate America	Cup of China
Great Britain	Lilah Fear; Lewis Gibson	Skate America	Finlandia Trophy
Italy	Charlène Guignard; Marco Fabbri	Grand Prix de France	Cup of China
Lithuania	Allison Reed; Saulius Ambrulevičius	Grand Prix de France	NHK Trophy
South Korea	Hannah Lim; Ye Quan	Skate Canada International	Finlandia Trophy
Spain	Olivia Smart; Tim Dieck	Skate America	Cup of China
United States	Emily Bratti; Ian Somerville	Skate Canada International	Grand Prix de France
United States	Oona Brown; Gage Brown	Skate Canada International	Finlandia Trophy
United States	Christina Carreira; Anthony Ponomarenko	NHK Trophy	Cup of China
United States	Madison Chock; Evan Bates	Skate America	NHK Trophy
United States	Caroline Green; Michael Parsons	NHK Trophy	Cup of China
United States	Leah Neset; Artem Markelov	Skate America	Grand Prix de France
United States	Eva Pate; Logan Bye	Grand Prix de France	Finlandia Trophy
United States	Emilea Zingas; Vadym Kolesnik	Skate Canada International	Finlandia Trophy
Australia	Holly Harris; Jason Chan	Skate Canada International	
China	Xiao Zixi; He Linghao	Cup of China	
China	Ren Junfei; Xing Jianing	Cup of China	
France	Natacha Lagouge; Arnaud Caffa	Grand Prix de France	
Germany	Jennifer Janse van Rensburg; Benjamin Steffan	NHK Trophy	
Israel	Elizabeth Tkachenko; Alexei Kiliakov	Skate America	
Japan	Azusa Tanaka; Shingo Nishiyama	NHK Trophy	
Japan	Utana Yoshida; Masaya Morita	NHK Trophy	
Ukraine	Mariia Pinchuk; Mykyta Pogorielov	Finlandia Trophy	
United States	Annabelle Morozov; Jeffrey Chen	Skate America	

=== Changes to preliminary assignments ===
==== Skate America ====
Changes to preliminary assignments (Skate America)
Discipline	Withdrew		Added		Notes	Ref.
Discipline	Date	Skater(s)	Date	Skater(s)	Notes	Ref.
Women	August 6	(South Korea); Lee Hae-in	August 9	(South Korea); Kim Min-chae	Suspension (Lee)	
Women	August 6	(South Korea); You Young	August 9	(Austria); Olga Mikutina	Suspension (You)	
Men	—N/a		September 13	(United States); Lucas Broussard	Host picks	
Women	—N/a		September 13	(United States); Elyce Lin-Gracey	Host picks	
Pairs	—N/a		September 13	(United States); Katie McBeath; Daniil Parkman	Host picks	
Ice dance	—N/a		September 13	(United States); Isabella Flores; Ivan Desyatov	Host picks	
Ice dance	October 3	(Canada); Laurence Fournier Beaudry; Nikolaj Sørensen	October 8	(Germany); Jennifer Janse van Rensburg; Benjamin Steffan	Suspension (Sørensen)	
Ice dance	October 15	(Germany); Jennifer Janse van Rensburg; Benjamin Steffan	October 15	(Canada); Alicia Fabbri; Paul Ayer		
Ice dance	October 16	(United States); Isabella Flores; Ivan Desyatov	October 16	(United States); Annabelle Morozov; Jeffrey Chen	Suspension (Desyatov)	

==== Skate Canada International ====
Changes to preliminary assignments (Skate Canada International)
Discipline	Withdrew		Added		Notes	Ref.
Discipline	Date	Skater(s)	Date	Skater(s)	Notes	Ref.
Ice dance	June 26	(Germany); Darya Grimm; Michail Savitskiy	June 26	(Australia); Holly Harris; Jason Chan	Grimm and Savitsky to remain on the Junior Grand Prix circuit	
Women	August 5	(United States); Ava Marie Ziegler	August 7	(Finland); Nella Pelkonen	Injury (Ziegler)	
Pairs	—N/a		September 23	(Uzbekistan); Ekaterina Geynish; Dmitrii Chigirev	Host picks	
Women	October 11	(Finland); Nella Pelkonen	October 11	(United States); Elyce Lin-Gracey		
Pairs	October 18	(Italy); Lucrezia Beccari; Matteo Guarise	October 21	(Poland); Ioulia Chtchetinina; Michał Woźniak	Foot issues (Beccari)	

==== Grand Prix de France ====
Changes to preliminary assignments (Grand Prix de France)
Discipline	Withdrew		Added		Notes	Ref.
Discipline	Date	Skater(s)	Date	Skater(s)	Notes	Ref.
Pairs	—N/a		July 11	(France); Aurélie Faula; Théo Belle	Host picks	
Pairs	September 13	(China); Peng Cheng; Wang Lei	September 17	(United States); Alisa Efimova; Misha Mitrofanov		
Pairs	September 17	(France); Océane Piegad; Denys Strekalin	September 24	(Uzbekistan); Ekaterina Geynish; Dmitrii Chigirev	Split	
Ice dance	—N/a		September 17	(France); Natacha Lagouge; Arnaud Caffa	Host picks	
Women	—N/a		September 17	(France); Maïa Mazzara	Host picks	
Women	October 17	(Belgium); Loena Hendrickx	October 18	(United States); Sarah Everhardt		
Women	October 22	(France); Maïa Mazzara	October 22	(France); Clémence Mayindu		

==== NHK Trophy ====
Changes to preliminary assignments (NHK Trophy)
Discipline	Withdrew		Added		Notes	Ref.
Discipline	Date	Skater(s)	Date	Skater(s)	Notes	Ref.
Men	August 5	(Slovakia); Adam Hagara	August 6	(Italy); Daniel Grassl	Hagara to remain on the Junior Grand Prix circuit	
Pairs	—N/a		August 9	(Netherlands); Daria Danilova; Michel Tsiba	Host picks	
Women	September 3	(South Korea); Lee Hae-in	September 10	(Austria); Olga Mikutina	Suspension (Lee)	
Men	—N/a		September 5	(Japan); Tatsuya Tsuboi	Host picks	
Women	—N/a		September 5	(Japan); Yuna Aoki	Host picks	
Ice dance	October 3	(Canada); Laurence Fournier Beaudry; Nikolaj Sørensen	October 8	(France); Marie Dupayage; Thomas Nabais	Suspension (Sørensen)	
Pairs	October 15	(United States); Valentina Plazas; Maximiliano Fernandez	October 16	(United Kingdom); Anastasia Vaipan-Law; Luke Digby	Injury	
Pairs	October 30	(Italy); Lucrezia Beccari; Matteo Guarise	October 31	(Philippines); Isabella Gamez; Aleksandr Korovin	Foot issues (Beccari)	
Pairs	November 1	(Philippines); Isabella Gamez; Aleksandr Korovin	November 1	(United States); Isabelle Martins; Ryan Bedard	Visa Issues	
Men	November 4	(Canada); Stephen Gogolev	November 4	(United States); Andrew Torgashev		

==== Finlandia Trophy ====
Changes to preliminary assignments (Finlandia Trophy)
Discipline	Withdrew		Added		Notes	Ref.
Discipline	Date	Skater(s)	Date	Skater(s)	Notes	Ref.
Women	—N/a		August 14	(Finland); Janna Jyrkinen	Host picks	
Women	—N/a		August 14	(Finland); Olivia Lisko	Host picks	
Women	September 3	(South Korea); You Young	September 10	(United States); Sarah Everhardt	Suspension (You)	
Women	November 4	(Belgium); Loena Hendrickx	November 5	(Italy); Lara Naki Gutmann		
Women	November 4	(United States); Isabeau Levito	November 6	(South Korea); Yun Ah-sun		
Pairs	November 8	(Australia); Anastasia Golubeva; Hektor Giotopoulos Moore	November 10	(Japan); Yuna Nagaoka; Sumitada Moriguchi	Health reasons	

==== Cup of China ====
Changes to preliminary assignments (Cup of China)
Discipline	Withdrew		Added		Notes	Ref.
Discipline	Date	Skater(s)	Date	Skater(s)	Notes	Ref.
Women	August 5	(United States); Ava Marie Ziegler	August 9	(South Korea); Kim Min-chae	Injury	
Men	—N/a		August 14	(China); Dai Daiwei	Host picks	
Women	—N/a		August 14	(China); An Xiangyi	Host picks	
Women	—N/a		August 14	(China); Zhu Yi	Host picks	
Pairs	—N/a		August 14	(China); Yang Yixi; Deng Shunyang	Host picks	
Pairs	—N/a		August 14	(China); Zhang Siyang; Jia Ziqi	Host picks	
Ice dance	—N/a		August 14	(China); Xiao Zixi; He Linghao	Host picks	
Ice dance	—N/a		August 14	(China); Ren Junfei; Xing Jianing	Host picks	
Pairs	September 13	(China); Peng Cheng; Wang Lei	September 13	(China); Wang Yuchen; Zhu Lei		
Pairs	October 15	(United States); Valentina Plazas; Maximiliano Fernandez	October 16	(Poland); Ioulia Chtchetinina; Michał Woźniak	Injury	
Pairs	October 15	(China); Zhang Siyang; Jia Ziqi	October 16	(United States); Katie McBeath; Daniil Parkman		
Pairs	November 11	(China); Yixi Yang; Shunyang Deng	November 12	(Philippines); Isabella Gamez; Aleksandr Korovin		
Men	November 22	(Canada); Wesley Chiu	—N/a		Medical reasons	

==== Grand Prix Final ====
Discipline	Withdrew		Added		Notes	Ref.
Discipline	Date	Skater(s)	Date	Skater(s)	Notes	Ref.
Men	November 27	(France); Adam Siao Him Fa	November 27	(Kazakhstan); Mikhail Shaidorov	Injury	
Pairs	December 2	(Canada); Deanna Stellato-Dudek; Maxime Deschamps	December 2	(Italy); Rebecca Ghilardi; Filippo Ambrosini	Illness (Deschamps)	

== Medal summary ==
Event	Discipline	Gold	Silver	Bronze
(United States) Skate America	Men	(United States); Ilia Malinin	(France); Kévin Aymoz	(Japan); Kao Miura
(United States) Skate America	Women	(Japan); Wakaba Higuchi	(Japan); Rinka Watanabe	(United States); Isabeau Levito
(United States) Skate America	Pairs	(Japan); Riku Miura; Ryuichi Kihara	(United States); Ellie Kam; Daniel O'Shea	(United States); Alisa Efimova; Misha Mitrofanov
(United States) Skate America	Ice dance	(United Kingdom); Lilah Fear; Lewis Gibson	(United States); Madison Chock; Evan Bates	(Spain); Olivia Smart; Tim Dieck

Event	Discipline	Gold	Silver	Bronze
Skate Canada International	Men	(United States); Ilia Malinin	(Japan); Shun Sato	(South Korea); Cha Jun-hwan
Skate Canada International	Women	(Japan); Kaori Sakamoto	(Japan); Rino Matsuike	(Japan); Hana Yoshida
Skate Canada International	Pairs	(Canada); Deanna Stellato-Dudek; Maxime Deschamps	(Uzbekistan); Ekaterina Geynish; Dmitrii Chigirev	(Australia); Anastasia Golubeva; Hektor Giotopoulos Moore
Skate Canada International	Ice dance	(Canada); Piper Gilles; Paul Poirier	(Canada); Marjorie Lajoie; Zachary Lagha	(France); Evgenia Lopareva; Geoffrey Brissaud

Event	Discipline	Gold	Silver	Bronze
Grand Prix de France	Men	(France); Adam Siao Him Fa	(Japan); Koshiro Shimada	(United States); Andrew Torgashev
Grand Prix de France	Women	(United States); Amber Glenn	(Japan); Wakaba Higuchi	(Japan); Rion Sumiyoshi
Grand Prix de France	Pairs	(Germany); Minerva Fabienne Hase; Nikita Volodin	(Italy); Sara Conti; Niccolò Macii	(Italy); Rebecca Ghilardi; Filippo Ambrosini
Grand Prix de France	Ice dance	(France); Evgenia Lopareva; Geoffrey Brissaud	(Italy); Charlène Guignard; Marco Fabbri	(United States); Emily Bratti; Ian Somerville

Event	Discipline	Gold	Silver	Bronze
(Japan) NHK Trophy	Men	(Japan); Yuma Kagiyama	(Italy); Daniel Grassl	(Japan); Tatsuya Tsuboi
(Japan) NHK Trophy	Women	(Japan); Kaori Sakamoto	(Japan); Mone Chiba	(Japan); Yuna Aoki
(Japan) NHK Trophy	Pairs	(Georgia (country)); Anastasiia Metelkina; Luka Berulava	(Japan); Riku Miura; Ryuichi Kihara	(United States); Ellie Kam; Daniel O'Shea
(Japan) NHK Trophy	Ice dance	(United States); Madison Chock; Evan Bates	(United States); Christina Carreira; Anthony Ponomarenko	(Lithuania); Allison Reed; Saulius Ambrulevičius

Event	Discipline	Gold	Silver	Bronze
(Finland) Finlandia Trophy	Men	(Japan); Yuma Kagiyama	(France); Kévin Aymoz	(Italy); Daniel Grassl
(Finland) Finlandia Trophy	Women	(Japan); Hana Yoshida	(Japan); Rino Matsuike	(Italy); Lara Naki Gutmann
(Finland) Finlandia Trophy	Pairs	(Canada); Deanna Stellato-Dudek; Maxime Deschamps	(Hungary); Maria Pavlova; Alexei Sviatchenko	(Italy); Rebecca Ghilardi; Filippo Ambrosini
(Finland) Finlandia Trophy	Ice dance	(United Kingdom); Lilah Fear; Lewis Gibson	(Canada); Piper Gilles; Paul Poirier	(Finland); Juulia Turkkila; Matthias Versluis

Event	Discipline	Gold	Silver	Bronze
Cup of China	Men	(Japan); Shun Sato	(Kazakhstan); Mikhail Shaidorov	(France); Adam Siao Him Fa
Cup of China	Women	(United States); Amber Glenn	(Japan); Mone Chiba	(South Korea); Kim Chae-yeon
Cup of China	Pairs	(Italy); Sara Conti; Niccolò Macii	(Germany); Minerva Fabienne Hase; Nikita Volodin	(Canada); Lia Pereira; Trennt Michaud
Cup of China	Ice dance	(Italy); Charlène Guignard; Marco Fabbri	(Canada); Marjorie Lajoie; Zachary Lagha	(United States); Christina Carreira; Anthony Ponomarenko

Event	Discipline	Gold	Silver	Bronze
(France) Grand Prix Final	Men	(United States); Ilia Malinin	(Japan); Yuma Kagiyama	(Japan); Shun Sato
(France) Grand Prix Final	Women	(United States); Amber Glenn	(Japan); Mone Chiba	(Japan); Kaori Sakamoto
(France) Grand Prix Final	Pairs	(Germany); Minerva Fabienne Hase; Nikita Volodin	(Japan); Riku Miura; Ryuichi Kihara	(Georgia (country)); Anastasiia Metelkina; Luka Berulava
(France) Grand Prix Final	Ice dance	(United States); Madison Chock; Evan Bates	(Italy); Charlène Guignard; Marco Fabbri	(United Kingdom); Lilah Fear; Lewis Gibson

=== Medal standings ===
Rank	Nation	Gold	Silver	Bronze	Total
1	Japan	8	12	7	27
2	United States	8	3	6	17
3	Canada	3	3	1	7
4	Italy	2	4	4	10
5	France	2	2	2	6
6	Germany	2	1	0	3
7	Great Britain	2	0	1	3
8	Georgia	1	0	1	2
9	Hungary	0	1	0	1
9	Kazakhstan	0	1	0	1
9	Uzbekistan	0	1	0	1
12	South Korea	0	0	2	2
13	Australia	0	0	1	1
13	Finland	0	0	1	1
13	Lithuania	0	0	1	1
13	Spain	0	0	1	1
Totals (16 entries)		28	28	28	84

== Qualification ==
At each event, skaters earn points toward qualifying for the Grand Prix Final. Following the sixth event, the top six highest-scoring skaters/teams advance to the Final. The points earned per placement are as follows:

Placement	Singles	Pairs/Ice dance
1st	15	15
2nd	13	13
3rd	11	11
4th	9	9
5th	7	7
6th	5	5
7th	4	—N/a
8th	3	—N/a

There were originally seven tie-breakers in cases of a tie in overall points:

1. Highest placement at an event. If a skater placed 1st and 3rd, the tiebreaker is the 1st place, and that beats a skater who placed 2nd in both events.
2. Highest combined total scores in both events. If a skater earned 200 points at one event and 250 at a second, that skater would win in the second tie-break over a skater who earned 200 points at one event and 150 at another.
3. Participated in two events.
4. Highest combined scores in the free skating/free dance portion of both events.
5. Highest individual score in the free skating/free dance portion from one event.
6. Highest combined scores in the short program/short dance of both events.
7. Highest number of total participants at the events.

If a tie remained, it was considered unbreakable, and the tied skaters all advanced to the Grand Prix Final.

=== Qualification standings ===
Pts.	Men	Women	Pairs	Ice dance
30	(United States); Ilia Malinin	(Japan); Kaori Sakamoto	(Canada); Deanna Stellato-Dudek; Maxime Deschamps	(United Kingdom); Lilah Fear; Lewis Gibson
30	(Japan); Yuma Kagiyama	(United States); Amber Glenn	—N/a	
28	(Japan); Shun Sato	(Japan); Wakaba Higuchi	(Japan); Riku Miura; Ryuichi Kihara	(United States); Madison Chock; Evan Bates
28	—N/a		(Germany); Minerva Fabienne Hase; Nikita Volodin	(Canada); Piper Gilles; Paul Poirier
28	—N/a		(Italy); Sara Conti; Niccolò Macii	(Italy); Charlène Guignard; Marco Fabbri
26	(France); Adam Siao Him Fa	(Japan); Hana Yoshida	—N/a	(France); Evgeniia Lopareva; Geoffrey Brissaud
26	(France); Kévin Aymoz	(Japan); Mone Chiba	—N/a	(Canada); Marjorie Lajoie; Zachary Lagha
26	—N/a	(Japan); Rino Matsuike	—N/a	—N/a
24	(Italy); Daniel Grassl	—N/a	(Georgia (country)); Anastasiia Metelkina; Luka Berulava	(United States); Christina Carreira; Anthony Ponomarenko
24	—N/a	—N/a	(United States); Ellie Kam; Daniel O'Shea	—N/a
22	(Kazakhstan); Mikhail Shaidorov	—N/a	(Italy); Rebecca Ghilardi; Filippo Ambrosini	—N/a
20	(United States); Andrew Torgashev	(Japan); Rinka Watanabe	(Hungary); Maria Pavlova; Alexei Sviatchenko	(Spain); Olivia Smart; Tim Dieck
20	—N/a	(South Korea); Kim Chae-yeon	(United States); Alisa Efimova; Misha Mitrofanov	(Lithuania); Allison Reed; Saulius Ambrulevičius
20	—N/a	(Japan); Rion Sumiyoshi	—N/a	
18	(Japan); Koshiro Shimada	—N/a	(Uzbekistan); Ekaterina Geynish; Dmitrii Chigirev	(Finland); Juulia Turkkila; Matthias Versluis
18	(Georgia (country)); Nika Egadze	—N/a	(Canada); Lia Pereira; Trennt Michaud	(Czech Republic); Natálie Taschlerová; Filip Taschler
18	(Japan); Sōta Yamamoto	—N/a	(Germany); Annika Hocke; Robert Kunkel	—N/a
16	(Japan); Kao Miura	(Italy); Lara Naki Gutmann	—N/a	—N/a
16	—N/a	(United States); Sarah Everhardt	—N/a	—N/a
15	—N/a	(Japan); Yuna Aoki	—N/a	—N/a
14	(Italy); Matteo Rizzo	(Switzerland); Kimmy Repond	(Poland); Ioulia Chtchetinina; Michał Woźniak	(United States); Caroline Green; Michael Parsons
14	—N/a	(United States); Alysa Liu	(United States); Emily Chan; Spencer Akira Howe	(United States); Emilea Zingas; Vadym Kolesnik
14	—N/a	(Belgium); Nina Pinzarrone	—N/a	—N/a
14	—N/a	(United States); Bradie Tennell	—N/a	—N/a
12	(Japan); Kazuki Tomono	—N/a	—N/a	(Czech Republic); Katerina Mrazkova; Daniel Mrazek
12	—N/a	—N/a	—N/a	(United States); Leah Neset; Artem Markelov
11	(South Korea); Cha Jun-hwan	(United States); Isabeau Levito	(Australia); Anastasia Golubeva; Hektor Giotopoulos Moore	(United States); Emily Bratti; Ian Somerville
11	(Japan); Tatsuya Tsuboi	(Canada); Madeline Schizas	—N/a	
11	(Latvia); Deniss Vasiļjevs	—N/a	—N/a	
10	—N/a	—N/a	(United Kingdom); Anastasia Vaipan-Law; Luke Digby	(Finland); Yuka Orihara; Juho Pirinen
9	—N/a	(United States); Elyce Lin-Gracey	(Canada); Kelly Ann Laurin; Loucas Éthier	(Georgia (country)); Diana Davis; Gleb Smolkin
8	(Estonia); Aleksandr Selevko	—N/a		
7	(Switzerland); Lukas Britschgi	(South Korea); Yun Ah-sun	(Netherlands); Daria Danilova; Michel Tsiba	(France); Loïcia Demougeot; Théo le Mercier
7	(Azerbaijan); Vladimir Litvintsev	(Japan); Mai Mihara	(United States); Katie McBeath; Daniil Parkman	—N/a
7	(United States); Jason Brown	—N/a	—N/a	—N/a
6	(China); Jin Boyang	(Georgia (country)); Anastasiia Gubanova	—N/a	—N/a
5	(Italy); Gabriele Frangipani	(France); Lorine Schild	(Japan); Yuna Nagaoka; Sumitada Moriguchi	(United States); Oona Brown; Gage Brown
5	(Italy); Nikolaj Memola	—N/a	(France); Camille Kovalev; Pavel Kovalev	—N/a
5	(China); Dai Daiwei	—N/a	—N/a	—N/a
4	(Canada); Aleksa Rakic	(Estonia); Niina Petrõkina	—N/a	—N/a
4	(United States); Maxim Naumov	(South Korea); Wi Seo-yeong	—N/a	—N/a
3	(United States); Tomoki Hiwatashi	(Switzerland); Livia Kaiser	—N/a	—N/a
3	(Japan); Nozomu Yoshioka	(Austria); Olga Mikutina	—N/a	—N/a
3	(Poland); Vladimir Samoilov	(Canada); Kaiya Ruiter	—N/a	—N/a

=== Qualifiers ===
No.	Men	Women	Pairs	Ice dance
1	(United States); Ilia Malinin	(Japan); Kaori Sakamoto	(Canada); Deanna Stellato-Dudek; Maxime Deschamps; (withdrew)	(United Kingdom); Lilah Fear; Lewis Gibson
2	(Japan); Yuma Kagiyama	(United States); Amber Glenn	(Japan); Riku Miura; Ryuichi Kihara	(United States); Madison Chock; Evan Bates
3	(Japan); Shun Sato	(Japan); Wakaba Higuchi	(Germany); Minerva Fabienne Hase; Nikita Volodin	(Canada); Piper Gilles; Paul Poirier
4	(France); Adam Siao Him Fa; (withdrew)	(Japan); Hana Yoshida	(Italy); Sara Conti; Niccolò Macii	(Italy); Charlène Guignard; Marco Fabbri
5	(France); Kévin Aymoz	(Japan); Mone Chiba	(Georgia (country)); Anastasiia Metelkina; Luka Berulava	(France); Evgenia Lopareva; Geoffrey Brissaud
6	(Italy); Daniel Grassl	(Japan); Rino Matsuike	(United States); Ellie Kam; Danny O'Shea	(Canada); Marjorie Lajoie; Zachary Lagha

Alternates

No.	Men	Women	Pairs	Ice dance
1	(Kazakhstan); Mikhail Shaidorov; (called up)	(Japan); Rinka Watanabe	(Italy); Rebecca Ghilardi; Filippo Ambrosini; (called up)	(United States); Christina Carreira; Anthony Ponomarenko
2	(United States); Andrew Torgashev	(South Korea); Kim Chae-yeon	(Hungary); Maria Pavlova; Alexei Sviatchenko	(Spain); Olivia Smart; Tim Dieck
3	(Japan); Koshiro Shimada	(Japan); Rion Sumiyoshi	(United States); Alisa Efimova; Misha Mitrofanov	(Lithuania); Allison Reed; Saulius Ambrulevičius

== Top scores ==
=== Men's singles ===
Top 10 best scores in the men's combined total
No.	Skater	Nation	Score	Event
1	Ilia Malinin	United States	301.82	2024 Skate Canada International
2	Yuma Kagiyama	Japan	300.09	2024 NHK Trophy
3	Kévin Aymoz	France	282.88	2024 Skate America
4	Kao Miura	Japan	278.67	2024 Skate America
5	Shun Sato	Japan	278.48	2024 Cup of China
6	Mikhail Shaidorov	Kazakhstan	276.17	2024 Cup of China
7	Daniel Grassl	Italy	264.85	2024 NHK Trophy
8	Nika Egadze	Georgia	261.71	2024 Skate America
9	Cha Jun-hwan	South Korea	260.31	2024 Skate Canada International
10	Sota Yamamoto	Japan	257.00	2024 Skate Canada International

Top 10 best scores in the men's short program
No.	Skater	Nation	Score	Event
1	Ilia Malinin	United States	106.22	2024 Skate Canada International
2	Yuma Kagiyama	Japan	105.70	2024 NHK Trophy
3	Kao Miura	Japan	102.96	2024 NHK Trophy
4	Shun Sato	Japan	98.75	2024 Cup of China
5	Nika Egadze	Georgia	93.89	2024 Skate America
6	Mikhail Shaidorov	Kazakhstan	93.21	2024 Cup of China
7	Sota Yamamoto	Japan	92.16	2024 Skate Canada International
8	Kévin Aymoz	France	92.04	2024 Skate America
9	Adam Siao Him Fa	France	91.22	2024 Cup of China
10	Kazuki Tomono	Japan	90.78	2024 Finlandia Trophy

Top 10 best scores in the men's free skating
No.	Skater	Nation	Score	Event
1	Ilia Malinin	United States	195.60	2024 Skate Canada International
2	Yuma Kagiyama	Japan	194.39	2024 NHK Trophy
3	Kévin Aymoz	France	190.84	2024 Skate America
4	Shun Sato	Japan	184.54	2024–25 Grand Prix Final
5	Mikhail Shaidorov	Kazakhstan	182.96	2024 Cup of China
6	Daniel Grassl	Italy	181.84	2024 NHK Trophy
7	Kao Miura	Japan	179.13	2024 Skate America
8	Cha Jun-hwan	South Korea	171.93	2024 Skate Canada International
9	Adam Siao Him Fa	France	171.68	2024 Grand Prix de France
10	Nika Egadze	Georgia	167.82	2024 Skate America

=== Women's singles ===
Top 10 best scores in the women's combined total
No.	Skater	Nation	Score	Event
1	Kaori Sakamoto	Japan	231.88	2024 NHK Trophy
2	Amber Glenn	United States	215.54	2024 Cup of China
3	Mone Chiba	Japan	212.54	2024 NHK Trophy
4	Kim Chae-yeon	South Korea	208.47	2024 Cup of China
5	Wakaba Higuchi	Japan	206.08	2024 Grand Prix de France
6	Rion Sumiyoshi	Japan	202.45	2024 Cup of China
7	Hana Yoshida	Japan	199.46	2024 Finlandia Trophy
8	Rino Matsuike	Japan	199.20	2024 Finlandia Trophy
9	Lara Naki Gutmann	Italy	198.49	2024 Finlandia Trophy
10	Rinka Watanabe	Japan	196.95	2024 Cup of China

Top 10 best scores in the women's short program
No.	Skater	Nation	Score	Event
1	Kaori Sakamoto	Japan	78.93	2024 NHK Trophy
2	Amber Glenn	United States	78.14	2024 Grand Prix de France
3	Mone Chiba	Japan	71.69	2024 NHK Trophy
4	Kim Chae-yeon	South Korea	70.90	2024 Grand Prix de France
5	Rion Sumiyoshi	Japan	70.48	2024 Cup of China
6	Yuna Aoki	Japan	69.78	2024 NHK Trophy
7	Rinka Watanabe	Japan	69.08	2024 Cup of China
8	Isabeau Levito	United States	68.43	2024 Skate America
9	Hana Yoshida	Japan	67.87	2024 Finlandia Trophy
10	Kimmy Repond	Switzerland	67.71	2024 Cup of China

Top 10 best scores in the women's free skating
No.	Skater	Nation	Score	Event
1	Kaori Sakamoto	Japan	152.95	2024 NHK Trophy
2	Amber Glenn	United States	144.70	2024 Cup of China
3	Mone Chiba	Japan	141.05	2024 Cup of China
4	Rino Matsuike	Japan	139.85	2024 Skate Canada International
5	Kim Chae-yeon	South Korea	139.20	2024 Cup of China
6	Wakaba Higuchi	Japan	139.10	2024 Grand Prix de France
7	Rion Sumiyoshi	Japan	134.47	2024 Grand Prix de France
8	Hana Yoshida	Japan	131.59	2024 Finlandia Trophy
9	Lara Naki Gutmann	Italy	131.43	2024 Finlandia Trophy
10	Nina Pinzarrone	Belgium	130.76	2024 Skate America

=== Pairs ===
Top 10 best scores in the pairs' combined total
No.	Team	Nation	Score	Event
1	Minerva Fabienne Hase; Nikita Volodin	Germany	218.10	2024–25 Grand Prix Final
2	Riku Miura; Ryuichi Kihara	Japan	214.23	2024 Skate America
3	Anastasiia Metelkina; Luka Berulava	Georgia	213.05	2024 NHK Trophy
4	Sara Conti; Niccolò Macii	Italy	211.05	2024 Cup of China
5	Deanna Stellato-Dudek; Maxime Deschamps	Canada	207.44	2024 Finlandia Trophy
6	Ellie Kam; Danny O'Shea	United States	201.73	2024 Skate America
7	Alisa Efimova; Misha Mitrofanov	United States	191.51	2024 Skate America
8	Ekaterina Geynish; Dmitrii Chigirev	Uzbekistan	189.65	2024 Skate Canada International
9	Lia Pereira; Trennt Michaud	Canada	188.74	2024 Cup of China
10	Annika Hocke; Robert Kunkel	Germany	188.54	2024 NHK Trophy

Top 10 best scores in the pairs' short program
No.	Team	Nation	Score	Event
1	Riku Miura; Ryuichi Kihara	Japan	77.79	2024 Skate America
2	Minerva Fabienne Hase; Nikita Volodin	Germany	76.72	2024–25 Grand Prix Final
3	Deanna Stellato-Dudek; Maxime Deschamps	Canada	75.89	2024 Finlandia Trophy
4	Sara Conti; Niccolò Macii	Italy	72.43	2024 Cup of China
5	Anastasiia Metelkina; Luka Berulava	Georgia	72.26	2024–25 Grand Prix Final
6	Ellie Kam; Danny O'Shea	United States	70.66	2024 Skate America
7	Rebecca Ghilardi; Filippo Ambrosini	Italy	67.43	2024 Finlandia Trophy
8	Annika Hocke; Robert Kunkel	Germany	67.37	2024 NHK Trophy
9	Lia Pereira; Trennt Michaud	Canada	66.90	2024 Cup of China
10	Maria Pavlova; Alexei Sviatchenko	Hungary	65.11	2024 Skate America

Top 10 best scores in the pairs' free skating
No.	Team	Nation	Score	Event
1	Anastasiia Metelkina; Luka Berulava	Georgia	142.77	2024 NHK Trophy
2	Minerva Fabienne Hase; Nikita Volodin	Germany	141.38	2024–25 Grand Prix Final
3	Sara Conti; Niccolò Macii	Italy	138.62	2024 Cup of China
4	Riku Miura; Ryuichi Kihara	Japan	137.55	2024 NHK Trophy
5	Deanna Stellato-Dudek; Maxime Deschamps	Canada	131.55	2024 Finlandia Trophy
6	Ellie Kam; Danny O'Shea	United States	131.07	2024 Skate America
7	Alisa Efimova; Misha Mitrofanov	United States	128.46	2024 Skate America
8	Ekaterina Geynish; Dmitrii Chigirev	Uzbekistan	126.12	2024 Skate Canada International
9	Maria Pavlova; Alexei Sviatchenko	Hungary	122.92	2024 Finlandia Trophy
10	Lia Pereira; Trennt Michaud	Canada	121.84	2024 Cup of China

=== Ice dance ===
Top 10 season's best scores in the combined total (ice dance)
No.	Team	Nation	Score	Event
1	Madison Chock; Evan Bates	United States	219.85	2024–25 Grand Prix Final
2	Piper Gilles; Paul Poirier	Canada	214.84	2024 Skate Canada International
3	Charlene Guignard; Marco Fabbri	Italy	209.13	2024 Cup of China
4	Lilah Fear; Lewis Gibson	Great Britain	206.38	2024 Skate America
5	Marjorie Lajoie; Zachary Lagha	Canada	205.16	2024 Cup of China
6	Christina Carreira; Anthony Ponomarenko	United States	198.97	2024 NHK Trophy
7	Juulia Turkkila; Matthias Versluis	Finland	196.60	2024 Finlandia Trophy
8	Olivia Smart; Tim Dieck	Spain	196.52	2024 Cup of China
9	Evgeniia Lopareva; Geoffrey Brissaud	France	195.91	2024–25 Grand Prix Final
10	Allison Reed; Saulius Ambrulevičius	Lithuania	195.52	2024 NHK Trophy

Top 10 season's best scores in the rhythm dance
No.	Team	Nation	Score	Event
1	Madison Chock; Evan Bates	United States	87.73	2024–25 Grand Prix Final
2	Piper Gilles; Paul Poirier	Canada	86.44	2024 Skate Canada International
3	Charlene Guignard; Marco Fabbri	Italy	84.84	2024 Cup of China
4	Lilah Fear; Lewis Gibson	Great Britain	83.56	2024 Skate America
5	Marjorie Lajoie; Zachary Lagha	Canada	81.53	2024 Cup of China
6	Christina Carreira; Anthony Ponomarenko	United States	79.64	2024 NHK Trophy
7	Juulia Turkkila; Matthias Versluis	Finland	78.31	2024 Finlandia Trophy
8	Allison Reed; Saulius Ambrulevičius	Lithuania	77.91	2024 NHK Trophy
9	Evgeniia Lopareva; Geoffrey Brissaud	France	77.75	2024 Grand Prix de France
10	Olivia Smart; Tim Dieck	Spain	75.96	2024 Cup of China

Top 10 season's best scores in the free dance
No.	Team	Nation	Score	Event
1	Madison Chock; Evan Bates	United States	132.12	2024–25 Grand Prix Final
2	Piper Gilles; Paul Poirier	Canada	128.40	2024 Skate Canada International
3	Charlene Guignard; Marco Fabbri	Italy	124.29	2024 Cup of China
4	Marjorie Lajoie; Zachary Lagha	Canada	123.63	2024 Cup of China
5	Lilah Fear; Lewis Gibson	Great Britain	122.87	2024–25 Grand Prix Final
6	Olivia Smart; Tim Dieck	Spain	120.56	2024 Cup of China
7	Christina Carreira; Anthony Ponomarenko	United States	119.33	2024 NHK Trophy
8	Evgeniia Lopareva; Geoffrey Brissaud	France	118.93	2024–25 Grand Prix Final
9	Juulia Turkkila; Matthias Versluis	Finland	118.29	2024 Finlandia Trophy
10	Allison Reed; Saulius Ambrulevičius	Lithuania	117.61	2024 NHK Trophy
