= Marie Dupayage =

French retired ice dancer (born 2000)

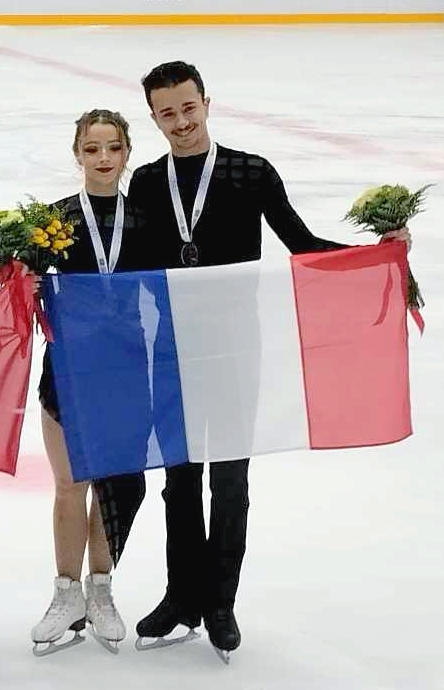
- Marie Dupayage and Thomas Nabais at the 2023 Warsaw Cup

Personal information
- Born: 9 August 2000 (age 26) Saint-Martin-d'Hères, France
- Home town: Villard de Lans, France
- Height: 1.55 m (5 ft 1 in)

Figure skating career
- Country: France
- Discipline: Ice dance
- Partner: Thomas Nabais
- Coach: Karine Arribert-Narce; Mahil Chantelauze
- Skating club: Villard de Lans Vercors Patinage
- Began skating: 2004
- Retired: April 28, 2026

Medal record
French Championships
Bronze medal – third place	2024 Vaujany	Ice dance

Marie Dupayage (born 9 August 2000) is a French retired ice dancer. With her skating partner, Thomas Nabais, she is the 2023 World University Games champion, 2024 French national bronze medalist, and has won three bronze medals at ISU Challenger Series events (2022 CS Nepela Memorial, 2022 CS Warsaw Cup, and 2023 CS Warsaw Cup).

== Personal life ==
Dupayage was born on 9 August 2000 in Saint-Martin-d'Hères, France, a suburb of Grenoble.

== Career ==
=== Early years ===
Dupayage began learning to skate in 2004. Skating with Thomas Nabais, she made her junior international debut in November 2016 at the Tallinn Trophy. Dupayage/Nabais placed 14th at their first ISU Junior Grand Prix (JGP) event, JGP Austria, in late August 2017. Their best JGP results were seventh in Latvia and Italy in September and October 2019, respectively.

=== 2021–22 season ===
Dupayage/Nabais' senior international debut came in October 2021; they placed fifth at the Trophée Métropole Nice Côte d'Azur and had the same result at the 2021 CS Denis Ten Memorial Challenge. In December, they finished fourth at the French Championships. In January 2022, they won silver at the Bavarian Open in Oberstdorf, Germany.

=== 2022–23 season ===
Dupayage/Nabais began their season by winning bronze at the 2022 CS Nepela Memorial and then silver at the Trophée Métropole Nice Côte d'Azur in October. In November, they placed ninth at the 2022 Grand Prix de France, their first Grand Prix appearance, and then took bronze at the 2022 CS Warsaw Cup.

After coming fifth at the French Championships, Dupayage/Nabais were assigned to compete at the 2023 Winter World University Games. They won the gold medal, in an upset victory over the favoured American team McNamara/Spiridonov. Both said it was a result to "savour."

=== 2023–24 season ===
Domestically, Dupayage/Nabais began the season with a silver medal at the 2023 Master's de Patinage. They then placed fifth at the 2023 CS Finlandia Trophy and second at the 2023 Mezzaluna Cup. Assigned to compete at the 2023 Grand Prix de France, the team finished the event in seventh place. Subsequently, Dupayage/Nabais won the bronze medal at the 2023 CS Warsaw Cup and gold at the 2023 Bosphorus Cup.

In December, the team would win the bronze medal at the 2024 French Championships. Selected to compete at the 2024 European Championships in Kaunas, Lithuania, Dupayage/Nabais would finish twelfth in the event. They then closed the season by winning gold at the 2024 Egna Dance Trophy.

=== 2024–25 season ===
Dupayage and Nabais began the season by winning silver at the 2024 Master's de Patinage before finishing eighth at the 2024 Denis Ten Memorial Challenge. Going on to compete on the 2024–25 Grand Prix circuit, they finished tenth at the 2024 Grand Prix de France and eighth at the 2024 NHK Trophy. They subsequently finished eleventh at the 2024 CS Warsaw Cup and won gold at the 2024 Bosphorus Cup.

In late December, they placed fourth at the 2025 French Championships.

== Programs ==
=== With Nabais ===
Season	Rhythm dance	Free dance	Exhibition
2025–2026	Just a Girl (from Yellowjackets) performed by Florence and the Machine; Just a Girl by No Doubt; Girls & Boys (Pet Shop Boys 12" Remix) by Blur choreo. by Karine Arribert-Narce	The Blue Hour: No. 2, Opening by Rachel Grimes, Shara Nova, & A Far Cry; Dernière danse by Indila choreo. by Karine Arribert-Narce	
2024–2025	Love Is All by Roger Glover & Ronnie James Dio; Move Over by Janis Joplin choreo. by Karine Arribert-Narce; White Rabbit by Jefferson Airplane & Grace Slick; Move Over by Janis Joplin choreo. by Karine Arribert-Narce	Weakend; Delighted; Delighted (Instrumental); Delighted by Benjamin Clementine choreo. by Karine Arribert-Narce	Tetris Main Theme by Andrew Lloyd Webber & Nigel Wright; Tetris by DaCaV5
2023–2024	St. John; Cry Me a River by Aerosmith; Should I Stay or Should I Go by The Clash choreo. by Karine Arribert-Narce	Mechanisms by Kirill Richter; Arioso (Largo F minor concerto) by Johann Sebastian Bach performed by William Haviland choreo. by Karine Arribert-Narce	
2022–2023	Samba: Quetzalcoatl Offering by Captain Planet; Rhumba: Águas de março by Smoke City; Samba: Dame Agua by Captain Planet arranged by Hugo Chouinard choreo. by Karine Arribert, Mahil Chantelauze	Innocent by Fleshquartet; Dance: I. First Movement by Oliver Davis, Kerenza Peacock, Huw Watkins, Paul Bateman choreo. by Karine Arribert, Mahil Chantelauze	
2021–2022	Toxic by Bloodshy & Avant	Innocent by Fleshquartet; Dance: I. First Movement by Oliver Davis, Kerenza Peacock, Huw Watkins, Paul Bateman choreo. by Karine Arribert, Mahil Chantelauze	
2019–2020	Foxtrot: Singin' in the Rain; Quickstep: Good Morning by Nacio Herb Brown, Arthur Freed	Market Diktat Song; Spero Lucem by Jean-Philippe Goude choreo. by Karine Arribert	
2018–2019	Tango: Paris Texas by Gotan Project; Tango: Juguete Rabioso by La Chicana choreo. by Karine Arribert	Spiegel im Spiegel by Arvo Pärt; La Valse d'Amélie (remix) by Yann Tiersen choreo. by Karine Arribert	
2017–2018	Rhumba: Take It Easy My Brother Charles by Jorge Ben; Cha Cha: Un Canto a mi tierra by Quantic and His Combo Bárbaro; Samba: Real in Rio by Real Copa choreo. by Karine Arribert	Yesterday by Tangoloco, Daniel Garcia Quinteto; Grand Guignol by Bajofondo choreo. by Karine Arribert	

== Competitive highlights ==
=== Ice dance with Thomas Nabais ===
- GP – Event of the ISU Grand Prix Series
- CS – Event of the ISU Challenger Series
- JGP – Event of the ISU Junior Grand Prix Series
- TBD – Assigned
- WD – Withdrew from event

Competition placements at senior level
Season	2021–22	2022–23	2023–24	2024–25	2025–26
World Championships		21st			
European Championships			12th		
French Championships	4th	5th	3rd	4th	5th
GP France		9th	7th	10th	
GP NHK Trophy				8th	
CS Denis Ten Memorial Challenge	5th			8th	
CS Finlandia Trophy			5th		
CS Golden Spin of Zagreb		WD			
CS Lombardia Trophy					7th
CS Nebelhorn Trophy					5th
CS Nepela Memorial		3rd			
CS Warsaw Cup		3rd	3rd	11th	6th
Bavarian Open	2nd				
Bosphorus Cup			1st	1st	
Challenge Cup		5th			
Egna Dance Trophy			1st	2nd	
Finnish Ice Dance Open					1st
Master's de Patinage	3rd	4th	2nd	2nd	5th
Mezzaluna Cup			2nd		
Open d'Andorra	8th				
Pavel Roman Memorial					1st
Sofia Trophy				3rd	
Swiss Open					1st
Trophée Métropole Nice	5th	2nd			
Winter University Games		1st			

Competition placements at junior level
Season	2016–17	2017–18	2018–19	2019–20	2020–21
French Championships	6th	4th	3rd	4th	1st
JGP Austria		14th			
JGP Italy				7th	
JGP Latvia				7th	
JGP Slovakia			12th		
Bosphorus Cup				4th	
Egna Dance Trophy			6th		2nd
Ice Star				9th	
Master's de Patinage	10th	3rd	5th	2nd	2nd
Mentor Toruń Cup	9th	12th	8th	9th	
Pavel Roman Memorial			6th		
Santa Claus Cup					1st
Tallinn Trophy	14th	13th			
Volvo Open Cup				9th	

== Detailed results ==
=== Ice dance with Thomas Nabais ===
ISU personal best scores in the +5/-5 GOE System
Segment	Type	Score	Event
Total	TSS	179.54	2025 CS Warsaw Cup
Rhythm dance	TSS	72.18	2023 CS Warsaw Cup
Rhythm dance	TES	41.66	2023 CS Warsaw Cup
Rhythm dance	PCS	30.52	2023 CS Warsaw Cup
Free dance	TSS	110.41	2025 CS Warsaw Cup
Free dance	TES	63.11	2025 CS Warsaw Cup
Free dance	PCS	47.30	2025 CS Warsaw Cup

Results in the 2024–25 season
Date	Event	SD		FD		Total	
Date	Event	P	Score	P	Score	P	Score
Sep 26–28, 2024	(France) 2024 Master's de Patinage	2	74.18	2	111.69	2	185.87
Oct 3–5, 2024	(Kazakhstan) 2024 CS Denis Ten Memorial Challenge	7	64.08	9	100.45	8	164.53
Nov 1–3, 2024	2024 Grand Prix de France	10	64.03	10	97.17	10	161.20
Nov 8–10, 2024	(Japan) 2024 NHK Trophy	8	64.52	8	101.28	8	165.80
Nov 20–24, 2024	(Poland) 2024 CS Warsaw Cup	9	65.89	10	96.96	11	162.85
Nov 25 – Dec 1, 2024	(Turkey) 2024 Bosphorus Cup	1	72.81	1	110.33	1	183.14
Dec 20–21, 2024	(France) 2025 French Championships	4	65.61	4	98.16	4	163.77
Jan 7-12, 2025	(Bulgaria) 2025 Sofia Trophy	3	69.75	4	105.89	3	175.64

Results in the 2025–26 season
Date	Event	RD		FD		Total	
Date	Event	P	Score	P	Score	P	Score
Aug 28–30, 2025	(France) 2025 Master's de Patinage	5	66.34	5	100.07	5	166.41
Sep 11–14, 2025	(Italy) 2025 CS Lombardia Trophy	9	58.45	6	98.21	7	156.66
Sep 25–27, 2025	(Germany) 2025 CS Nebelhorn Trophy	5	62.91	5	99.03	5	161.94
Oct 23–26, 2025	(Switzerland) 2025 Swiss Open	1	69.63	1	100.76	1	170.39
Nov 14-16, 2025	(Czech Republic) 2025 Pavel Roman Memorial	1	66.59	1	112.17	1	178.76
Nov 19–23, 2025	(Poland) 2025 CS Warsaw Cup	6	69.13	6	110.41	6	179.54
Dec 18-20, 2025	(France) 2026 French Championships	5	66.60	4	105.57	5	172.17
Feb 14-15, 2026	(Finland) 2026 Finnish Ice Dance Open	1	73.80	1	111.58	1	185.38
