= 2024 CS Trophée Métropole Nice Côte d'Azur =

Figure skating competition

- Type: ISU Challenger Series
- Date: October 16 – 20
- Season: 2024–25
- Location: Nice, France
- Host: Fédération Française des Sports de Glace; Baie des Anges Association
- Venue: Palais des sports Jean-Bouin

Champions
- Men's singles: (France) Adam Siao Him Fa
- Women's singles: (South Korea) Kim Chae-yeon
- Ice dance: (Lithuania) Allison Reed and Saulius Ambrulevičius
- Previous CS: 2024 CS Budapest Trophy
- Next CS: 2024 CS Nepela Memorial

The 2024 CS Trophée Métropole Nice Côte d'Azur was held October 16–20, 2024 at the Palais des sports Jean-Bouin in Nice, France. It was part of the 2024–25 ISU Challenger Series. Medals were awarded in men's singles, women's singles, and ice dance.

The International Skating Union published the list of entries on September 27, 2024.

== Changes to preliminary assignments ==
Date	Discipline	Withdrew	Ref.
October 3	Men	(France); Xan Rols	
October 3	Men	(Germany); Arthur Wolfgang Mai	
October 3	Women	(France); Maé-Bérénice Méité	
October 3	Women	(Israel); Mariia Seniuk	
October 15	Women	(France); Maïa Mazzara	
October 15	Ice dance	(France); Marie Dupayage; Thomas Nabais	
October 15	Men	(Italy); Matteo Nalbone	
October 15	Men	(Sweden); Gabriel Folkesson	
October 15	Women	(Philippines); Sofia Lexi Jacqueline Frank	
October 15	Women	(Serbia); Antonina Dubinina	
October 15	Ice dance	(Denmark); Elisabetta Incardona; Rafael Marc Drozd Musil	
October 17	Men	(Italy); Nikolaj Memola	
October 17	Men	(Latvia); Fedir Kulish	
October 17	Women	(Austria); Natalie Klotz	
October 17	Women	(Sweden); Josefin Taljegård	

== Medal summary ==
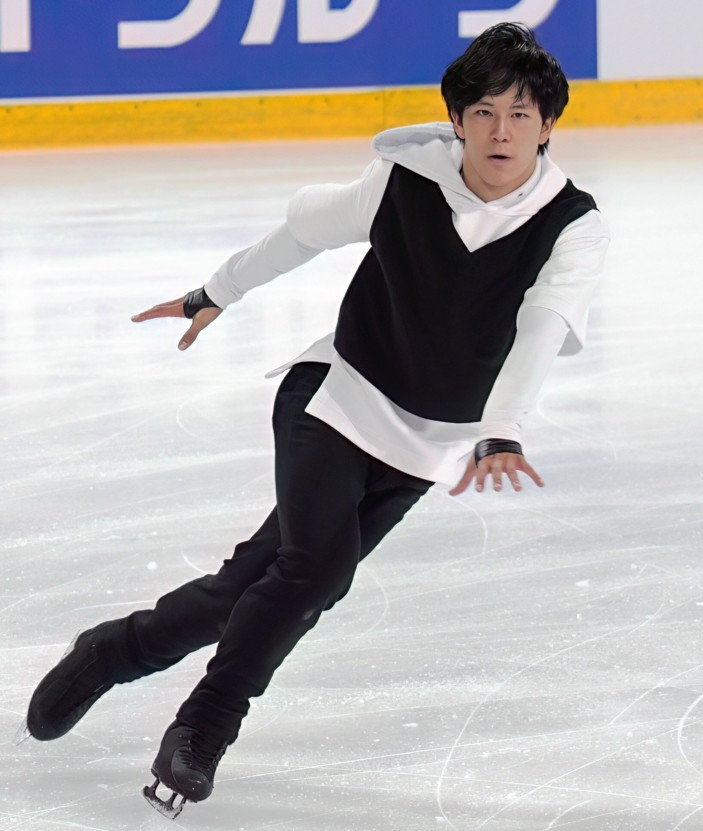
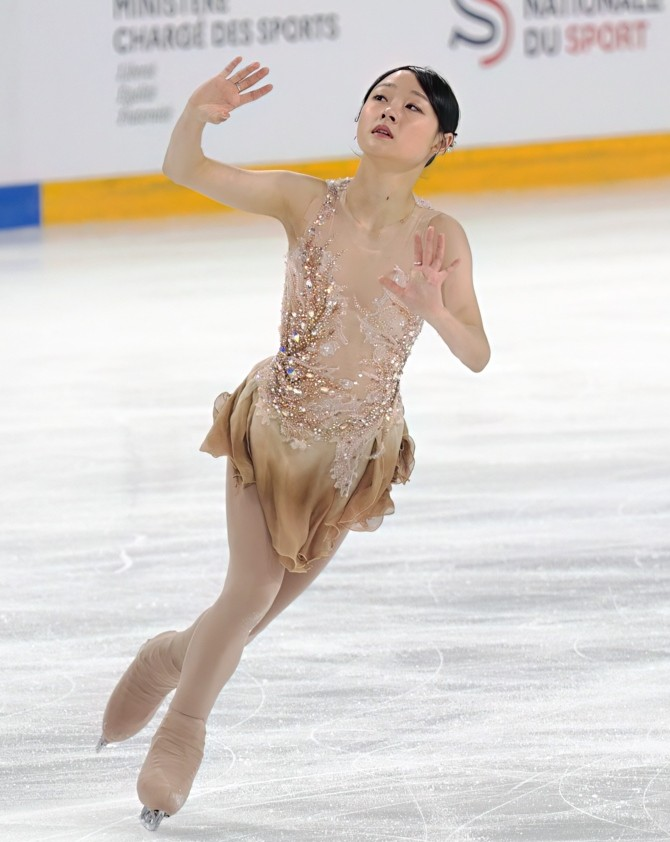
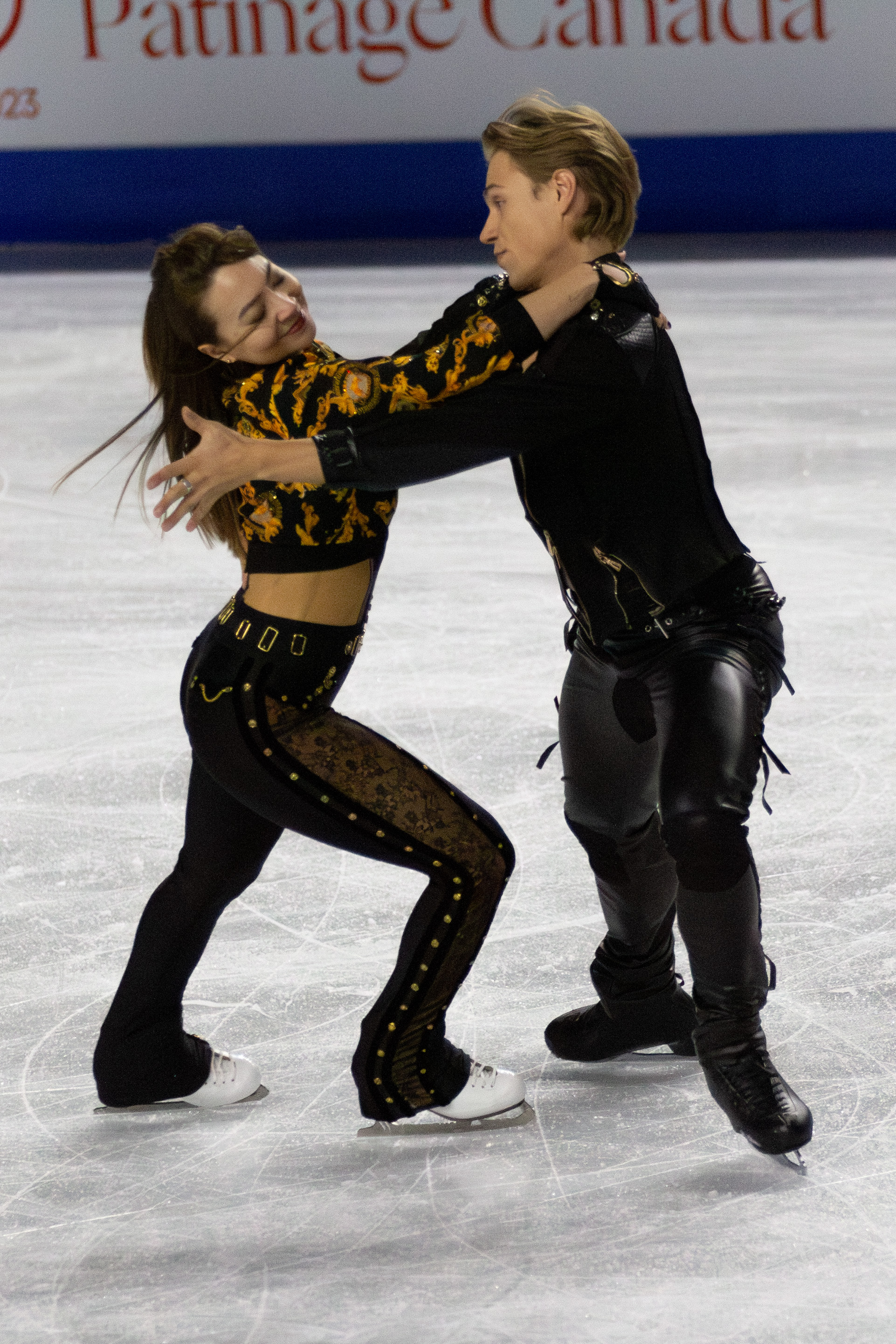
The 2024 Trophée Métropole Nice Côte d'Azur champions: Adam Siao Him Fa of France (men's singles); Kim Chae-yeon of South Korea (women's singles); and Allison Reed and Saulius Ambrulevičius of Lithuania (ice dance)

Medalists
Discipline	Gold	Silver	Bronze
Men	(France); Adam Siao Him Fa	(Switzerland); Lukas Britschgi	(Estonia); Mihhail Selevko
Women	(South Korea); Kim Chae-yeon	(Estonia); Niina Petrõkina	(Canada); Fée Ann Landry
Ice dance	(Lithuania); Allison Reed; Saulius Ambrulevičius	(United States); Caroline Green; Michael Parsons	(United States); Eva Pate; Logan Bye

== Results ==
=== Men's singles ===
Men's results
Rank	Skater	Nation	Total	SP		FS	
1st place, gold medalist(s)	Adam Siao Him Fa	France	272.38	1	96.74	1	175.64
2nd place, silver medalist(s)	Lukas Britschgi	Switzerland	233.22	2	87.98	4	145.24
3rd place, bronze medalist(s)	Mihhail Selevko	Estonia	232.95	5	78.93	2	154.02
4	Andreas Nordebäck	Sweden	226.50	4	79.89	3	146.61
5	Ivan Shmuratko	Ukraine	218.19	7	74.61	5	143.58
6	Joseph Klein	United States	210.79	8	69.89	6	140.90
7	Liam Kapeikis	United States	208.93	10	68.15	7	140.78
8	Aleksandr Selevko	Estonia	208.88	3	83.32	13	125.56
9	Li Yu-Hsiang	Chinese Taipei	206.40	12	66.17	8	140.23
10	Lee Si-hyeong	South Korea	206.28	6	77.10	10	129.18
11	Arlet Levandi	Estonia	205.90	13	65.90	9	140.00
12	Casper Johansson	Sweden	195.88	9	69.20	12	126.68
13	Corentin Spinar	France	192.62	14	64.78	11	127.84
14	Cha Young-hyun	South Korea	184.98	15	64.71	16	120.27
15	Xavier Vauclin	France	181.57	17	61.09	15	120.48
16	Samy Hammi	France	177.99	18	57.24	14	120.75
17	Davide Lewton Brain	Monaco	176.32	11	68.02	18	108.30
18	Kai Kovar	United States	167.61	20	55.07	17	112.54
19	Pablo García	Spain	155.13	22	48.40	19	106.73
20	Paolo Borromeo	Philippines	154.32	21	51.07	20	103.25
21	Landry Le May	France	151.40	16	63.31	22	88.09
22	Joshua Rols	France	148.77	19	56.62	21	92.15
23	Anton Skoficz	Austria	107.80	23	37.15	23	70.65

=== Women's singles ===
Women's results
Rank	Skater	Nation	Total	SP		FS	
1st place, gold medalist(s)	Kim Chae-yeon	South Korea	204.67	1	69.42	1	135.25
2nd place, silver medalist(s)	Niina Petrõkina	Estonia	187.57	2	66.98	2	120.59
3rd place, bronze medalist(s)	Fée Ann Landry	Canada	169.03	6	56.11	3	112.92
4	Janna Jyrkinen	Finland	168.97	4	56.73	4	112.24
5	Marina Piredda	Italy	162.19	3	59.73	7	102.46
6	Alexandra Feigin	Bulgaria	157.47	5	56.26	10	101.21
7	Michelle Lee	United States	154.59	8	52.43	9	102.16
8	Olivia Lisko	Poland	152.79	14	48.08	6	104.71
9	Kristina Lisovskaja	Estonia	150.91	12	48.65	8	102.26
10	Breken Brezden	Canada	150.54	20	42.17	5	108.37
11	Ginevra Negrello	Italy	149.59	10	50.37	11	99.22
12	Nataly Langerbaur	Estonia	148.82	7	54.90	13	93.92
13	Anastasija Konga	Latvia	142.57	15	47.89	12	94.68
14	Stefanie Pesendorfer	Austria	139.40	11	49.96	14	89.44
15	Tetiana Firsova	Ukraine	133.55	16	45.56	16	87.99
16	Sarah Marie Pesch	Germany	132.99	13	48.18	17	84.81
17	Jade Hovine	Belgium	132.54	18	43.25	15	89.29
18	Flora Marie Schaller	Austria	128.90	17	44.31	18	84.59
19	Julia Brovall	Sweden	128.64	9	51.04	21	77.60
20	Lovisa Aav	Sweden	123.23	21	41.10	19	82.13
21	Oona Ounasvuori	Finland	120.65	22	40.37	20	80.28
22	Tara Prasad	India	117.44	19	42.74	22	74.70
23	Kristina Grigorova	Bulgaria	112.49	23	39.44	23	73.05
24	Anna-Flora Colmor Jepsen	Denmark	108.82	24	38.06	24	70.76
25	Nuria Rodriguez Serrano	Spain	99.52	25	36.01	25	63.52
26	Amanda Hsu	Chinese Taipei	95.85	26	35.13	26	60.72
27	Annika Skibby	Denmark	83.50	27	31.33	27	52.17

=== Ice dance ===
Ice dance results
Rank	Team	Nation	Total	RD		FD	
1st place, gold medalist(s)	Allison Reed; Saulius Ambrulevičius	Lithuania	189.93	1	77.96	2	111.97
2nd place, silver medalist(s)	Caroline Green; Michael Parsons	United States	186.47	2	73.70	1	112.77
3rd place, bronze medalist(s)	Eva Pate; Logan Bye	United States	180.83	3	72.82	4	108.01
4	Yuka Orihara; Juho Pirinen	Finland	180.48	4	71.24	3	109.24
5	Natacha Lagouge; Arnaud Caffa	France	172.20	5	69.30	5	102.90
6	Phebe Bekker; James Hernandez	Great Britain	169.62	6	67.77	6	101.85
7	Nadiia Bashynska; Peter Beaumont	Canada	150.78	7	60.02	8	90.76
8	Karla Maria Karl; Kai Hoferichter	Germany	149.57	8	59.86	9	89.71
9	Ren Junfei; Xing Jianing	China	146.61	11	55.04	7	91.57
10	Xiao Zixi; He Linghao	China	142.93	10	55.32	10	87.61
11	Samantha Ritter; Daniel Brykalov	Azerbaijan	134.37	15	50.04	11	84.33
12	Natalia Pallu-Neves; Jayin Panesar	Brazil	133.97	13	51.97	12	82.00
13	Emese Csiszèr; Mark Shapiro	Hungary	133.75	12	54.62	13	79.13
14	Ava Aversano Martinez; Christian Bennett	Mexico	130.46	14	51.65	14	78.81
15	Lin Yufei; Gao Zijian	China	125.02	16	49.56	17	75.46
16	Chelsea Verhaegh; Sherim van Geffen	Netherlands	123.87	18	45.48	15	78.39
17	Viktoriia Azroian; Artur Gruzdev	Armenia	123.16	17	47.21	16	75.95
18	Maxine Weatherby; Oleksandr Kolosovskyi	Azerbaijan	112.68	19	44.72	18	67.96
WD	Carolane Soucisse; Shane Firus	Ireland	Withdrew	9	55.41	Withdrew from competition	
