= Jérémie Colot =

Personal information
- Born: 24 January 1986 (age 40) Villeneuve-Saint-Georges, France
- Height: 1.75 m (5 ft 9 in)

Figure skating career
- Country: France
- Skating club: Bercy
- Began skating: 1991
- Retired: 2008

Jérémie Colot (born 24 January 1986) is a French former competitive figure skater. He won one ISU Junior Grand Prix medal and competed at the 2005 World Junior Championships, placing 11th. After moving up to the senior level, he won three international medals — silver at the 2005 Merano Cup and 2006 Triglav Trophy and bronze at the 2007 International Cup of Nice. He retired from competition around 2008.

== Programs ==
Season	Short program	Free skating
2007–2008	The Question of U by Prince	The Old Landmark (from The Blues Brothers); Let There Be Drums; Perry Mason Theme (from Blues Brothers 2000); Blue Suede Shoes performed by Johnny Hallyday
2006–2007	The Question of U by Prince	Alexander by Vangelis
2004–2005	The Last Temptation of Christ by Peter Gabriel	Pirates of the Caribbean by Klaus Badelt

== Competitive highlights ==
GP: Grand Prix; JGP: Junior Grand Prix

International
Event	02–03	03–04	04–05	05–06	06–07	07–08
GP Bompard					10th	10th
Cup of Nice						3rd
Merano Cup				2nd		
Triglav Trophy				2nd		
International: Junior
Junior Worlds			11th			
JGP France	10th		3rd			
JGP Romania			7th			
JGP Slovakia		9th				
JGP Slovenia		7th				
Gardena	6th J.					
National
French Champ.	11th	8th	9th	6th	6th	9th
