= Niina Petrõkina =

Estonian figure skater (born 2004)

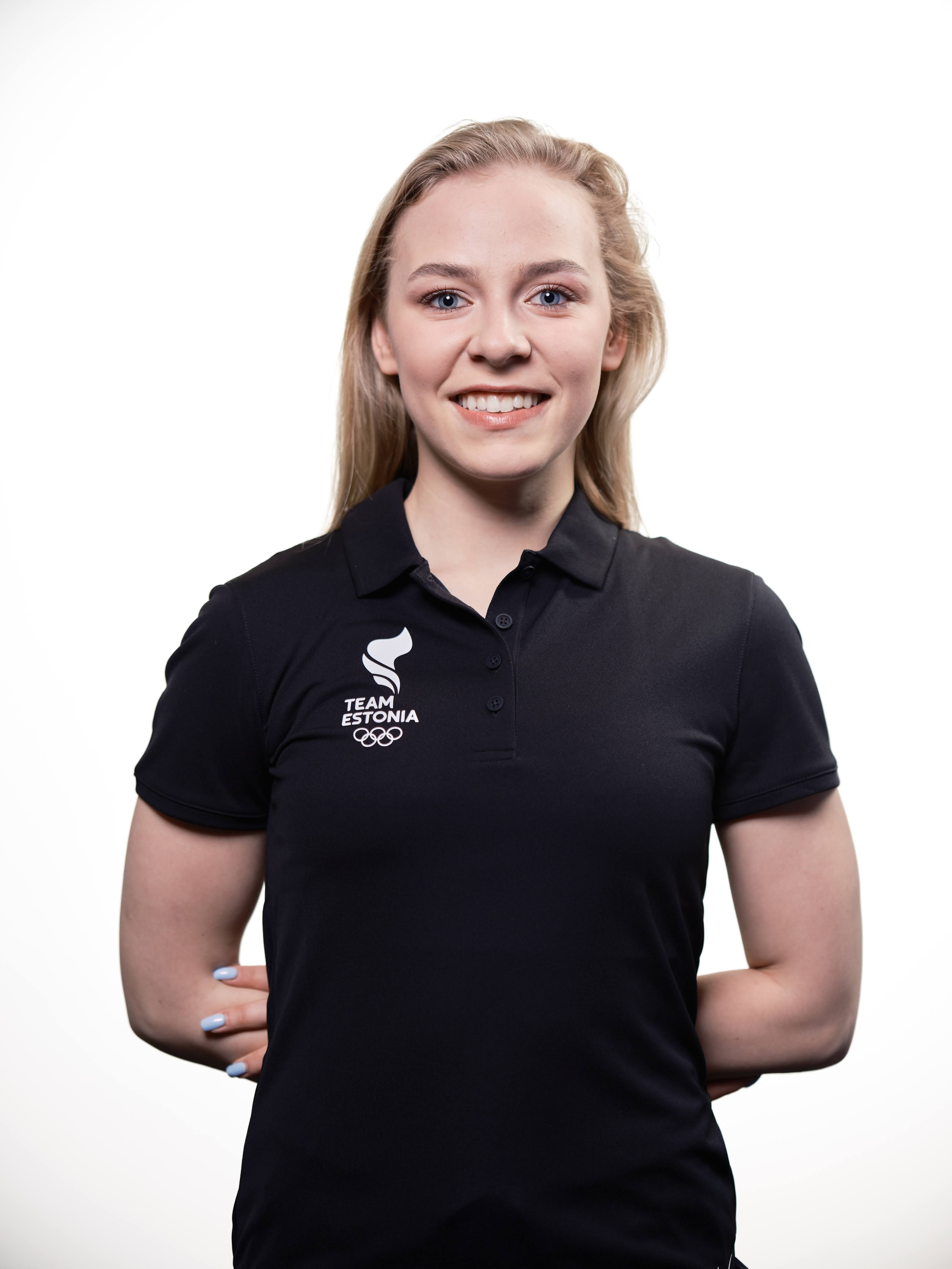
- Niina Petrõkina in 2025

Personal information
- Other names: Petrokina, Petrykina
- Born: August 14, 2004 (age 22) Tallinn, Estonia
- Home town: Tallinn, Estonia
- Height: 1.58 m (5 ft 2 in)

Figure skating career
- Country: Estonia
- Discipline: Women's singles
- Coach: Svetlana Varnavskaja
- Skating club: Cascade Figure Skating Club
- Began skating: 2008

Medal record
European Championships
Gold medal – first place	2025 Tallinn	Singles
Gold medal – first place	2026 Sheffield	Singles
Estonian Championships
Gold medal – first place	2022 Tallinn	Singles
Gold medal – first place	2023 Tallinn	Singles
Gold medal – first place	2025 Tallinn	Singles
Gold medal – first place	2026 Tallinn	Singles
Silver medal – second place	2020 Tallinn	Singles

Niina Petrõkina (born August 14, 2004) is an Estonian figure skater. She is a two-time European champion (2025, 2026), the 2023 Skate America bronze medalist, the 2026 Skate Canada silver medalist, the 2026 Finlandia Trophy silver medalist, a seven-time ISU Challenger Series medalist, and a four-time Estonian national champion (2022–23, 2025–26). Additionally, Petrõkina represented Estonia at the 2026 Winter Olympics.

She is the first Estonian skater to win a medal on the ISU Grand Prix and qualify for the Grand Prix Final. Additionally, she is the first Estonian to win a European title.

== Personal life ==
Petrõkina was born on August 14, 2004, in Tallinn, Estonia to Russian parents, Natalja Masterova and Aleksei Petrõkin. Whilst coming from a Russian-speaking family, Petrõkina identifies as Estonian and has expressed a desire to speak the Estonian language fluently. "I am Estonian, I was born here, I have an Estonian passport. And I speak Estonian too, just not as fluently as my native language".

She graduated from high school in 2023, with plans to begin studying for a coaching diploma, and eventual pursuit of university education. She speaks Estonian, Russian, and English.

== Career ==
=== Early years ===
Petrõkina began learning how to skate in 2008 at the age of four and has been coached by Svetlana Varnavskaja for the duration of her competitive career. She began competing internationally for Estonia during the 2012–13 season at the Chicks level before competing as a basic and advanced novice. She made her international junior debut at the Haabersti Cup in October 2017.

=== 2018–19 season: Junior Grand Prix debut ===
Petrõkina made her Junior Grand Prix debut in November at the 2018 JGP Czech Republic, where she finished eleventh. She did not receive a second JGP assignment that season. She earned the bronze medals in the junior women's events at the 2018 Volvo Open Cup and 2018 Tallinn Trophy before placing fourth at the 2019 Estonian Championships. She later took the titles at four more junior internationals in the new year.

=== 2019–20 season ===
Petrõkina received two Junior Grand Prix assignments to open her season. Competing in Latvia, she placed sixth, and in Poland, tenth. She defended her junior title at the 2019 Tallinn Trophy and placed second at the 2019 Ice Star in the lead up to the 2020 Estonian Championships, where she won the silver medal behind Eva-Lotta Kiibus.

In March 2020, Petrõkina competed at her first World Junior Championships, held at home in Tallinn. She failed to advance to the free skate, placing thirty-third.

=== 2020–21 season: Battle with bone marrow failure ===
Petrõkina missed the entirety of the pandemic-affected 2020–21 season due to what was initially reported as an unspecified illness. She revealed in 2023 that she had been suffering from an uncertain illness for some time prior the 2020 World Junior Championships, and following her poor showing there she was diagnosed with "severe" aplastic anemia. Petrõkina required a bone marrow transplant, but could not find a suitable donor, and was hospitalized for five months while undergoing immunosuppression therapy. Initially advised that she would not be able to return to skating for two to three years, a prospect she considered tantamount to the end of her career and which caused "a little depression", she was ultimately able to resume training in advance of the following season.

=== 2021–22 season: Senior international debut ===
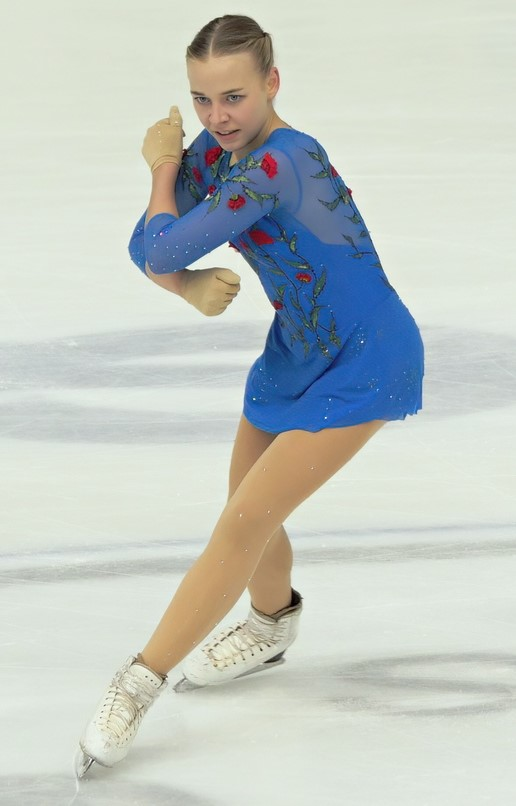
Petrõkina at the 2021 CS Cup of Austria

Petrõkina opened her season on the Junior Grand Prix at the second installment of the 2021 JGP France. She placed seventh at the event and followed that performance up with a fourth-place finish at the 2021 JGP Austria, a career-best placement for her on the Junior Grand Prix circuit.

In November, Petrõkina made her senior international debut at her first Challenger series event, the 2021 CS Cup of Austria, where she won the bronze medal behind Japanese skater Wakaba Higuchi, and South Korea's Park Yeon-jeong. She also finished nearly forty points ahead of domestic rival and reigning Estonian champion Eva-Lotta Kiibus. She received a second Challenger assignment the following weekend, the 2021 CS Warsaw Cup, where she won the silver medal behind Russian competitor Maiia Khromykh and ahead of Ekaterina Kurakova of Poland. In December, Petrõkina won her first senior national title at the 2022 Estonian Championships over Kiibus. After winning her national title, Petrõkina competed at a third Challenger assignment, the 2021 CS Golden Spin of Zagreb. She placed fourth in the short program but advanced into bronze medal position by winning the free skate ahead of gold medalist Anastasiia Gubanova and silver medalist Amber Glenn.

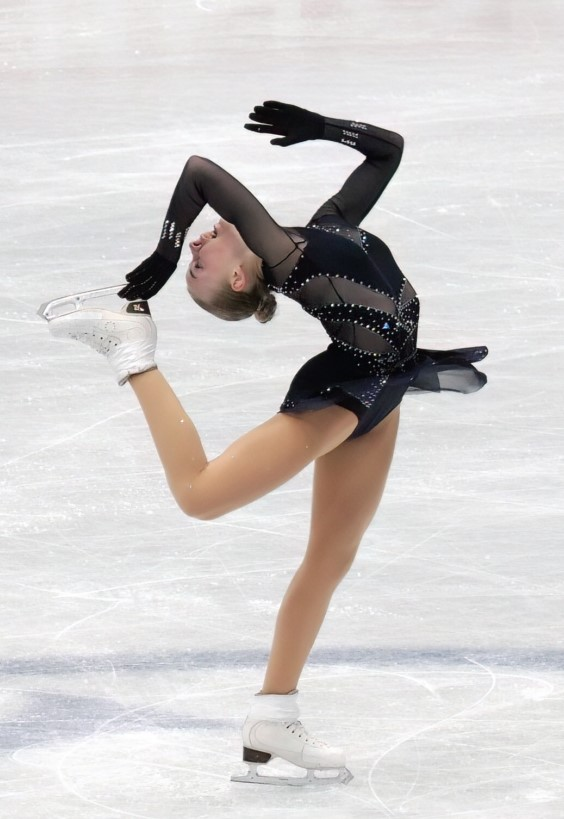
Petrõkina performing a catch-foot layback spin at the 2022 World Championships

Due to Petrõkina's national results, she qualified as the top-seeded Estonian woman to one of two berths for her country at the 2022 European Championships in Tallinn. She finished eighth, also defeating Kiibus for a third time that season, but despite this, she was not named to the Estonian Olympic team due to the national federation's criteria for assigning the spot. Petrõkina expressed excitement at competing at the European championships alongside top athletes in the sport. Notably, the event was held in the same arena as the 2020 World Junior Championships, where she had failed to qualify for the free skate.

Shortly after the conclusion of the 2022 Winter Olympics, Russia invaded Ukraine. As a result, the International Skating Union banned all Russian athletes from competing at ISU championships. As Russian women had dominated international figure skating in recent years, this had a significant impact on the field. Petrõkina then made her World Championship debut, finishing sixteenth. Due to both the invasion and the Omicron variant, the World Junior Championships could not be held as scheduled in Sofia in early March, and were rescheduled for mid-April in Tallinn, the third ISU championship held there in that year. Petrõkina was sixth in the short program with a clean skate. She struggled in the free skate, dropping to ninth overall.

=== 2022–23 season: Second national title ===
Petrõkina began the new season at two Challenger events, with an eleventh-place finish at the 2022 CS Nebelhorn Trophy and a bronze medal at 2022 CS Budapest Trophy, the latter her third Challenger medal. She was then invited to make her Grand Prix debut at the 2022 Skate Canada International, where she finished in sixth place. She finished the Grand Prix by coming seventh at the 2022 NHK Trophy.

After winning her second consecutive Estonian national title, Petrõkina competed at the 2023 European Championships in Espoo. She was seventh in the short program, though less than a point back of fifth. She rose to sixth after the free skate, and cried "tears of relief" at the result. Hers was the highest-ever placement for an Estonian woman at the European Championships.

Petrõkina finished twelfth at the 2023 World Junior Championships. She went on to place ninth at the 2023 World Championships in Saitama, achieving her "minimum goal" of a top ten ordinal that would secure a second Estonian women's berth the following year.

=== 2023–24 season: Grand Prix medal and leg injury ===
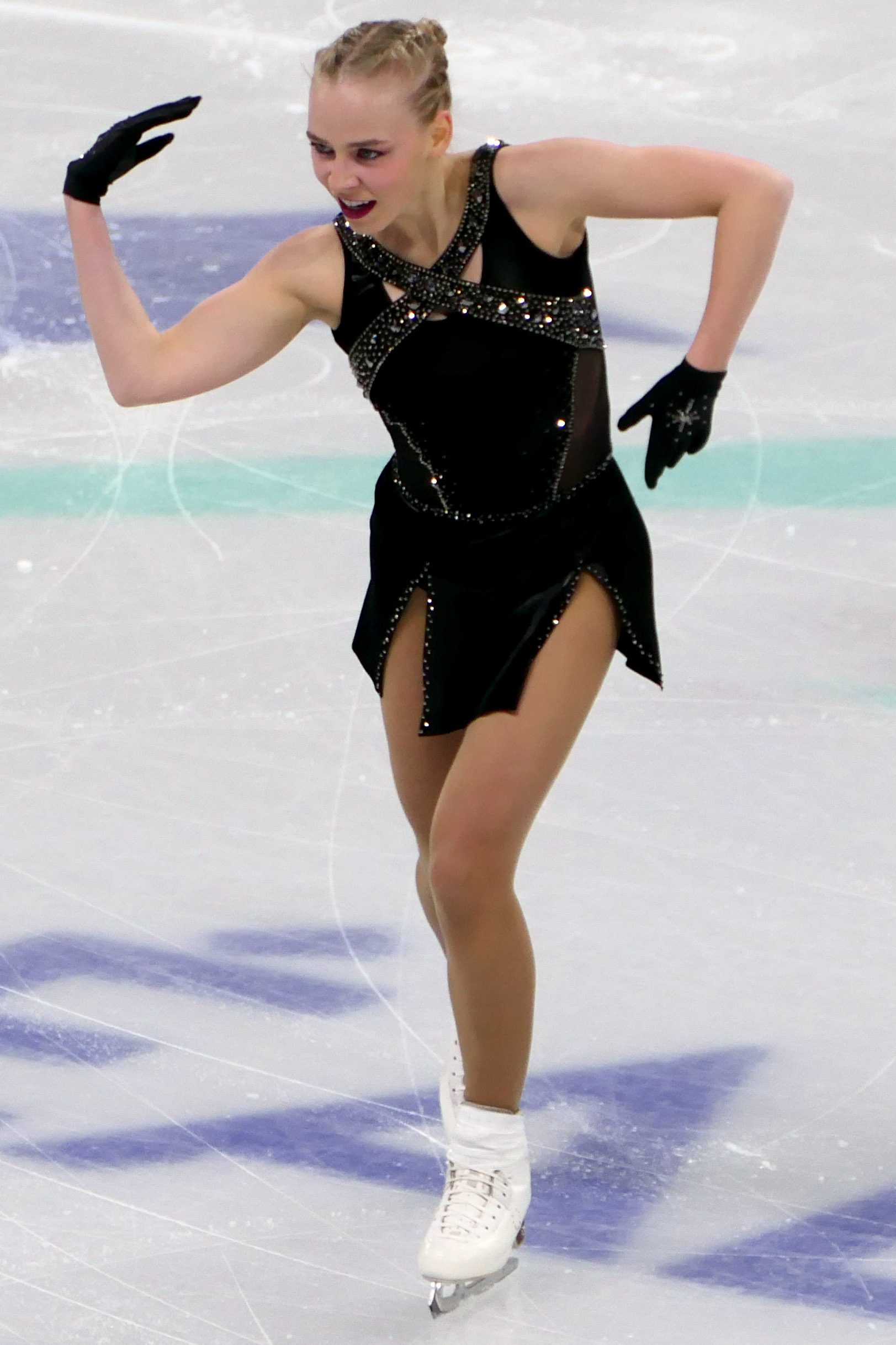
Petrõkina during her short program at the 2024 World Championships

Petrõkina began the season at the 2023 CS Lombardia Trophy, coming seventh, before winning the bronze medal at the Shanghai Trophy. She began the Grand Prix at the 2023 Skate America, where she finished fourth in the short program, 5.05 points back of third-place Isabeau Levito and 0.78 ahead of Mone Chiba in fifth. In the free skate she was fourth as well, with a new personal best score of 129.53, and rose to third place overall, winning the bronze medal. This was the first Grand Prix medal for an Estonian skater in any discipline, of which she said she was "so proud". Petrõkina came fourth at the 2023 Cup of China.

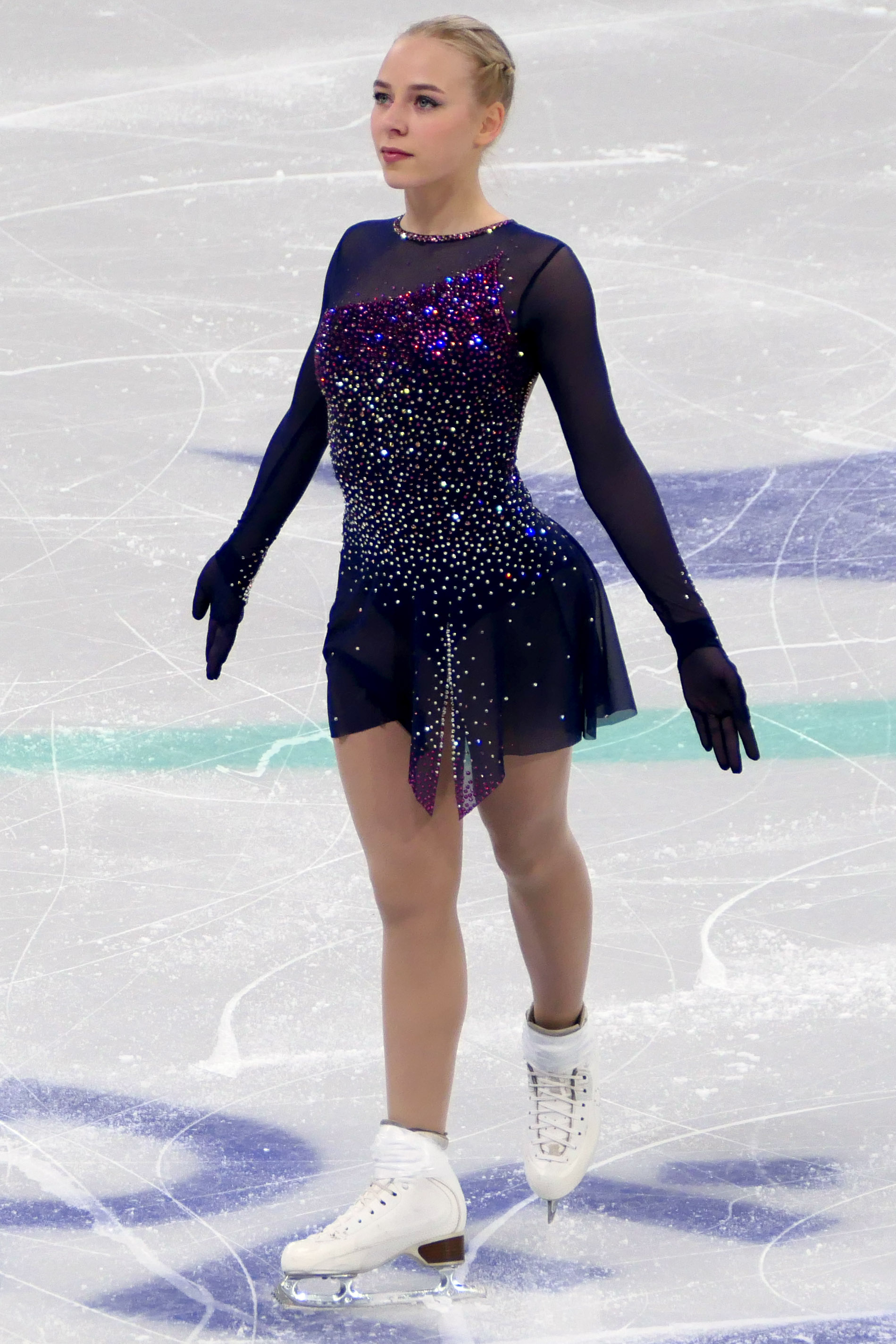
Petrõkina during her free skate at the 2024 World Championships

Assigned to compete at the 2023 CS Golden Spin of Zagreb, Petrõkina broke her left fibula falling out of a jump in practice, and withdrew from the event. As a result, she was also unable to compete at the national championships later that month, or to potentially attend the European Championships that were to be held in neighbouring Kaunas, Lithuania. Petrõkina indicated that she hoped to be able to compete at the World Championships in March.

While Petrõkina's leg was not completely healed by the time of the World Championships in Montreal, she felt sufficiently ready to attending, saying "I feel pain in my leg on some jumps and also when I do something wrong. I need more time to fully recover, but there is none." She and her coaches opted to remove one jump type from her programs, as she was still unable to perform it. She finished a surprise seventh place in the short program, earning her best score of the season (66.23). The free skate proved more difficult, and Petrõkina earned 110.30, ending up sixteenth overall. Speaking afterward, she said that after an initial mistake on a double Axel "it felt like someone stole my body and I couldn't control it." Despite these problems, Petrõkina opined "I did my best." She remained in Canada for a time after the championships to work with choreographer, Mark Pillay, saying she planned to focus on full recovery before preparations for the next season.

=== 2024–25 season: European gold ===
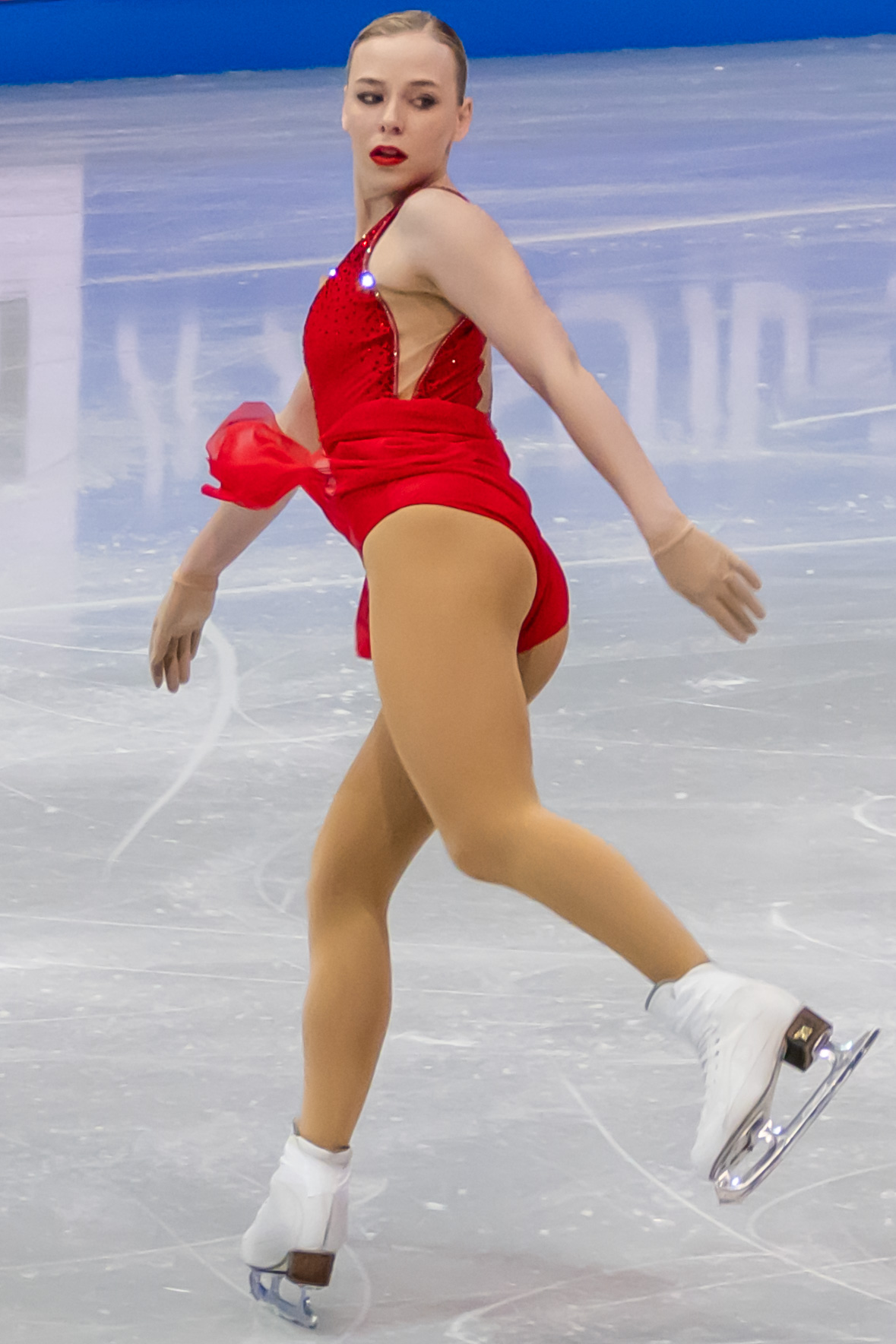
Petrõkina during the short program at the 2025 World Championships

Petrõkina began the season by competing on the 2024–25 ISU Challenger Series, finishing seventh at the 2024 Lombardia Trophy and winning silver at the 2024 Trophée Métropole Nice Côte d'Azur. Going on to compete on the 2024–25 Grand Prix series, she had a rough outing at the 2024 NHK Trophy, where she finished a disappointing tenth place. One week later, Petrõkina competed at her second Grand Prix assignment, the 2024 Finlandia Trophy. She only placed eleventh in the short program after popping a planned triple lutz into a single and getting no value for that jump. However, Petrõkina managed to deliver a strong free skate, placing fourth in that segment of the competition and moving up to seventh place overall. In an interview following the event, she said, "Today I have a real smile on my face. I am physically really ready but now I had two bad shorts in a row. I have to and will work on my mental side. But I am happy about today's Free Skate. I am looking forward to rest for a few days now, as it was really stressful with these two competitions back to back. Next then will be Estonian Nationals and then Europeans and I really want to do well there."

In mid-December, Petrõkina won her third national title at the 2025 Estonian Championships.

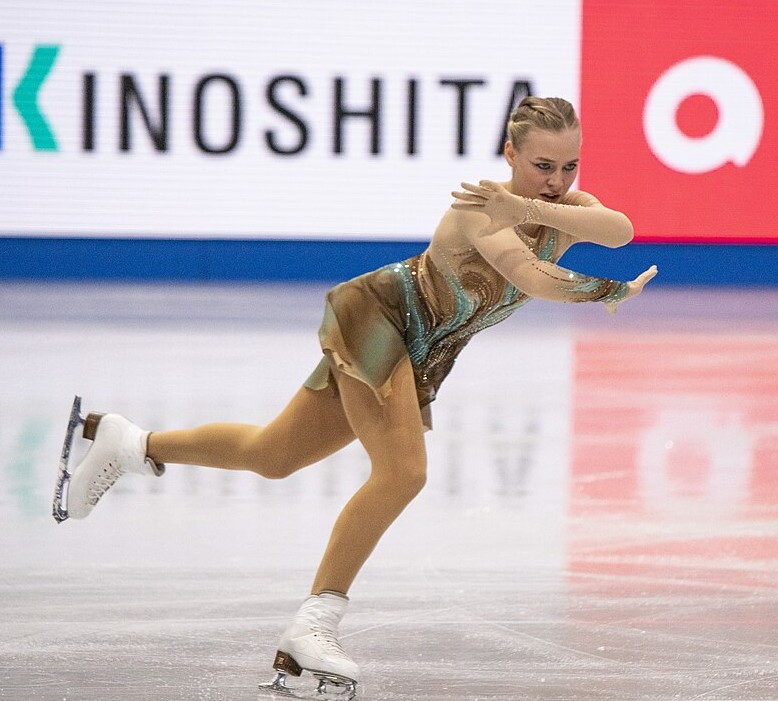
Petrõkina during the free skate at the 2025 World Championships

Petrõkina was assigned to compete at the 2025 European Championships at the end of January, which were held in her hometown of Tallinn. She skated a strong short program, where she landed a triple Lutz-triple toe loop combination, and she finished that segment in second place. In the free skate, she had a fall during her choreography, but she otherwise skated cleanly, landing all her jumps and receiving a level four on all her spins and her step sequence. She moved into first place to win the gold medal, becoming the first ever Estonian skater to win the European title. After her victory, she received a phone call from Alar Karis, the president of Estonia. Petrõkina said afterward, "This moment was my dream, and today it came true. The small fall at the beginning of my program actually helped me stay calm because I knew I couldn't afford another mistake."

She next competed at the Road to 26 Trophy, which was held in February in Milan and served as a test event for the 2026 Winter Olympics. In the short program, she had a disappointing performance, including an invalid jumping pass, and she finished in fifth place. She said afterward that she was "not ready" as she had not had much time to rest after the European Championships. However, she had a much stronger free skate, and she won the competition overall.

Petrõkina finished the season with an eighth-place finish at the 2025 World Championships in Boston, Massachusetts, United States. “Right after I finished my performance, I was like, ‘Yes, the season is over! Finally, I can get some rest!” she said. “I think I really need that. But I really think it was a good skate and I’m really happy about it.” Her placement won two quotas for Estonian women singles skaters to compete at 2026 Winter Olympics.

=== 2025–26 season: Milano Cortina Olympics, second consecutive European title, and Achilles tendon injury ===
Petrõkina performing a spiral in her free skate at the 2026 Winter Olympics

Petrõkina opened the season with an eighth-place finish at the 2025 CS Nepela Memorial. Following the event, she shared that due to ongoing health issues, she required medical treatment and as a result, had a withdrawn from the 2025 Grand Prix de France. In late October, Petrõkina shared that following the 2025 European Championships, her Achilles had become inflamed and that after nine months of being in pain, she had finally undergone surgery earlier that month. She further shared that a major goal going forward is to compete at at least one major international event prior to the 2026 European Championships. She subsequently withdrew from her second Grand Prix assignment, the 2025 Finlandia Trophy, as well.

Petrõkina returned to competition at the 2025 CS Tallinn Trophy in late November, where she finished fourth overall. The following month, she won her fourth national title at the 2026 Estonian Championships.

In January, Petrõkina competed at the 2026 European Championships, where she delivered two clean programs, scoring personal bests in all three competition segments and winning the gold medal for a second consecutive time. "Tonight, the crowd was so loud that I thought I was in Estonia!" said Petrõkina. "At my first European victory, I was shocked. This time I came here to win." Following the event, Petrõkina was officially named to the 2026 Winter Olympic team.

On 17 February, Petrõkina competed in the short program of the 2026 Winter Olympics. She placed tenth in that segment due to the second part of her triple-triple combination being called as landed on the quarter. "I was really nervous, but I’m glad I brought everything with me and did my job well. So I’m happy," she said following her performance. "It feels amazing because I really wanted to come here and see how everything is. The atmosphere and everything else, since it’s my first time here. I just wanted to see how everything is set up here."

Two days later, Petrõkina competed in the free skate segment, where she delivered a clean skate and earned positive grade of execution on every one of her elements. She ultimately placed sixth in that segment and moved up to seventh place overall. This result made history, it being the best result for an Estonian figure skater in any discipline at a Winter Olympic Games. "I’m really happy because I did all my jumps, all my elements, and I gave it my all," she said after the free skate. "I showed all my emotions and everything I had. I am proud of it."

Petrõkina and speed skater, Marten Liiv, were subsequently chosen as Estonia's flag bearers for the Olympic closing ceremony.

In March, Petrõkina competed at the 2026 World Championships in Prague, Czech Republic. She placed eleventh in the short program but rose to sixth in the free skate, finishing in seventh place overall, the highest placement ever achieved by an Estonian woman at a World Championships. "I feel amazing right now," said Petrõkina after the free skate. "I’m done. I was really nervous because it was hard to compete in the last competition of the season. But I pushed everything that I had inside of me and now I’m free."

=== 2026–27 season ===
Petrõkina opened her season at the 2026 Tallinn Open where she won the gold medal. She attempted a quadruple Salchow jump in her free skate, although it was deemed under rotated. Niina subsequently went onto win gold at the 2026 Lombardia Trophy, as well as the 2026 Trialeti Trophy.

In October, Petrõkina competed at the 2026 Skate Canada International. Earning a new personal best short program and total score, she won the silver medal behind Mao Shimada of Japan. “Of course, it’s not what I wanted to show,” she said after the free skate. “I wanted to show ultra-C elements. But for this time, I thought it would be good if I just skated clean and showed myself that I can skate clean. So now I can move forward and hope to show this ultra-C element at the next competition, or maybe in the future.”

Petrõkina subsequently competed at the 2026 Finlandia Trophy. Placing second overall, she secured the silver medal and a spot at the upcoming Grand Prix Final. Petrõkina became the first Estonian skater to qualify for the Final. "Qualifying for the Grand Prix Final was one of my biggest goals. I’ve never been there before, and I honestly couldn’t even imagine it happening. I’m so happy that all the hard work my team and I have put in has paid off. We achieved this together, and it means so much to me" she shared.

== Programs ==
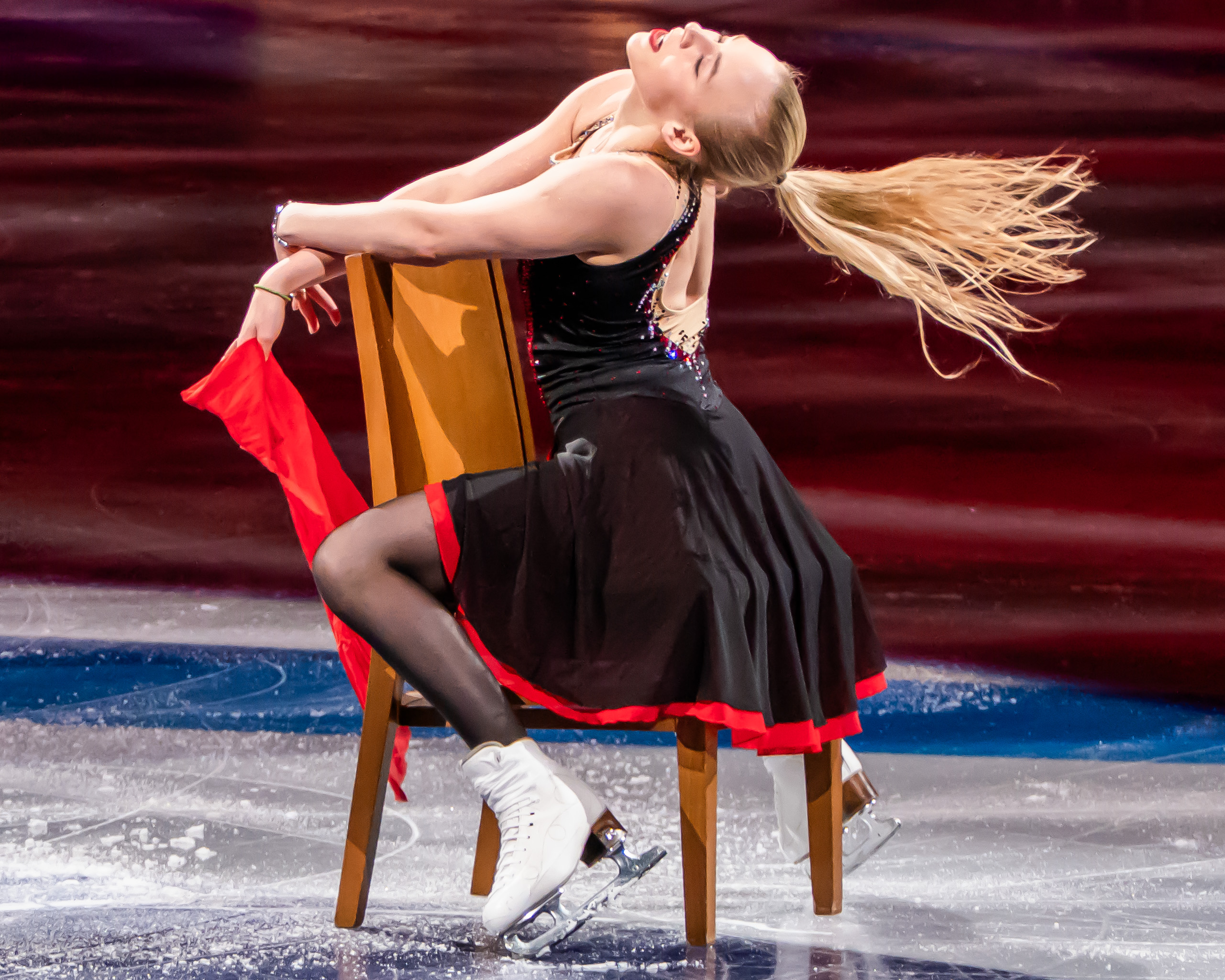
Petrõkina performing in the gala at the 2025 World Championships

Season	Short program	Free skating	Exhibition
2026–2027	Berghain by Rosalía, Björk, & Yves Tumor choreo. by Shae-Lynn Bourne	Game of Thrones: Mother of Dragons; Not Today; Mhysa; Pray (High Valyrian) by Ramin Djawadi, Matt Bellamy choreo. by Mark Pillay	
2025–2026	Criminal Tango by Dinamika Ensemble, Nathalie Bonin, & Simone Benyacar choreo. by Mark Pillay	Dune; Dune Theme Epic Trailer Version (Paul's Dream) by EpicTrailerMusicUK; The Dune Sketchbook by Hans Zimmer choreo. by Mark Pillay	Don't Cry for Me Argentina (from Evita) by Andrew Lloyd Webber & Julie Covington performed by Caroline Mhlanga; Cell Block Tango (from Chicago) performed by Mýa, Ekaterina Shchelkanova, Denise Faye, Susan Misner, Catherine Zeta-Jones, Taye Diggs, & Deidre Goodwin
2024–25	Soldier by Tommee Profitt ft. Fleurie choreo. by Mark Pillay	Dune; Dune Theme Epic Trailer Version (Paul's Dream) by EpicTrailerMusicUK; The Dune Sketchbook by Hans Zimmer choreo. by Mark Pillay	Cell Block Tango (from Chicago) performed by Mýa, Ekaterina Shchelkanova, Denise Faye, Susan Misner, Catherine Zeta-Jones, Taye Diggs, & Deidre Goodwin
2023–2024	Run by Bri Bryant, Marvin Brooks, & 2WEI choreo. by Mark Pillay	Dusty Road; Prelude (Age Of Heroes) by Balázs Havasi choreo. by Mark Pillay	Malibu Sunset by Edvin Marton; Loca by Shakira ft. Dizzee Rascal; Waka Waka (This Time for Africa) by Shakira
2022–2023	Give Us a Little Love by Fallulah choreo. by Adam Solya	Dusty Road; Prelude (Age Of Heroes) by Balázs Havasi choreo. by Mark Pillay	Everybody Wants to Rule the World (from The Hunger Games: Catching Fire) performed by Lorde; Kuula by Ott Lepland
2021–2022	Je n'attendais que vous performed by Masha Mnjoyan choreo. by Ilya Averbukh	Love of My Life by Queen performed by Royal Philharmonic Orchestra choreo. by Taavi Rand	Everyday Is Christmas by Sia
2020–2021	Did not compete this season		
2019–2020	It's Wonderful by Paolo Conte performed by Swingrowers choreo. by Taavi Rand	Love of My Life by Queen performed by Royal Philharmonic Orchestra choreo. by Taavi Rand	
2018–2019	Chandelier by Sia choreo. by Taavi Rand	Nothing Else Matters by Metallica performed by Marlisa Punzalan choreo. by Taavi Rand	

== Competitive highlights ==
- GP – Event of the ISU Grand Prix Series
- JGP – Event of the ISU Junior Grand Prix Series
- CS – Event of the ISU Challenger Series
- TBD – Assigned
- WD – Withdrew from event

Competition placements at senior level
Season	2017–18	2018–19	2019–20	2020–21	2021–22	2022–23	2023–24	2024–25	2025–26	2026–27
Winter Olympics									7th	
World Championships					16th	9th	16th	8th	7th	
European Championships					7th	6th		1st	1st	
Estonian Championships	7th	4th	2nd		1st	1st		1st	1st	
Grand Prix Final										TBD
GP Finland								7th		2nd
GP NHK Trophy						7th		10th		
GP Skate America							3rd			
GP Skate Canada						6th				2nd
GP Cup of China							4th			
CS Golden Spin of Zagreb					3rd					
CS Ice Challenge					3rd					
CS Lombardia Trophy							7th	7th		1st
CS Nebelhorn Trophy						11th				
CS Nepela Memorial									8th	
CS Tallinn Trophy									4th	
CS Trialeti Trophy										1st
CS Trophée Métropole Nice								2nd		
CS Warsaw Cup					2nd					
Road to 26 Trophy								1st		
Shanghai Trophy							3rd			
Tallink Hotels Cup						1st	4th			
Tallinn Open										1st
Challenge Cup							5th			
CS Budapest Trophy						3rd				

Competition placements at junior level
Season	2015–16	2017–18	2018–19	2019–20	2021–22	2022–23
World Junior Championships				33rd	9th	12th
Estonian Championships	3rd	3rd	2nd	1st	1st	1st
JGP Austria					4th	
JGP Czech Republic			11th			
JGP France					7th	
JGP Latvia				6th		
JGP Poland				10th		
Ice Star				2nd		
Tallink Hotels Cup		1st	1st	1st		
Tallinn Trophy			3rd	1st		
Volvo Open Cup			3rd			

== Detailed results ==
ISU personal best scores in the +5/-5 GOE System
Segment	Type	Score	Event
Total	TSS	221.07	2026 Skate Canada International
Short program	TSS	77.24	2026 Skate Canada International
Short program	TES	44.08	2026 CS Lombardia Trophy
Short program	PCS	34.63	2026 Skate Canada International
Free skating	TSS	145.53	2026 European Championships
Free skating	TES	76.11	2026 European Championships
Free skating	PCS	69.90	2026 Skate Canada International

- Small medals for the short program and free skating are only awarded at ISU Championships.

=== Senior level ===
Results in the 2017-18 season
Date	Event	SP		FS		Total	
Date	Event	P	Score	P	Score	P	Score
Dec 9-10, 2017	(Estonia) 2018 Estonian Championships	6	43.82	7	83.20	7	127.02

Results in the 2018-19 season
Date	Event	SP		FS		Total	
Date	Event	P	Score	P	Score	P	Score
Dec 14–16, 2018	(Estonia) 2019 Estonian Championships	3	47.90	4	94.55	4	142.45

Results in the 2019-20 season
Date	Event	SP		FS		Total	
Date	Event	P	Score	P	Score	P	Score
Dec 13–15, 2019	(Estonia) 2020 Estonian Championships	2	58.66	2	112.92	2	171.58

Results in the 2021-22 season
Date	Event	SP		FS		Total	
Date	Event	P	Score	P	Score	P	Score
Nov 11–14, 2021	2021 CS Cup of Austria	3	57.39	2	123.78	3	181.17
Nov 17-20, 2021	(Italy) 2021 CS Warsaw Cup	3	64.92	3	123.94	2	188.86
Dec 4–5, 2021	(Estonia) 2022 Estonian Championships	1	70.07	1	141.76	1	211.83
Dec 8–11, 2021	(Croatia) 2021 CS Golden Spin of Zagreb	4	61.35	1	121.22	3	182.57
Jan 10–16, 2022	(Estonia) 2022 European Championships	17	58.30	7	128.77	8	187.07
Mar 21–27, 2022	(France) 2022 World Championships	17	60.24	16	116.36	16	176.60

Results in the 2022-23 season
Date	Event	SP		FS		Total	
Date	Event	P	Score	P	Score	P	Score
Sep 21–24, 2022	(Germany) 2022 CS Nebelhorn Trophy	13	47.34	5	104.66	11	152.00
Oct 13-16, 2022	(Hungary) 2022 CS Budapest Trophy	8	53.00	2	123.32	3	176.36
Oct 28-30, 2022	2022 Skate Canada International	7	61.68	8	119.66	6	181.34
Nov 17–20, 2022	(Japan) 2022 NHK Trophy	8	58.81	6	121.48	7	180.29
Dec 17–18, 2022	(Estonia) 2023 Estonian Championships	1	63.98	1	136.94	1	200.92
Jan 25–29, 2023	(Finland) 2023 European Championships	7	61.05	6	122.69	6	183.74
Mar 22–26, 2023	(Japan) 2023 World Championships	6	68.00	12	125.49	9	193.49

Results in the 2023-24 season
Date	Event	SP		FS		Total	
Date	Event	P	Score	P	Score	P	Score
Sep 8–10, 2023	(Italy) 2023 CS Lombardia Trophy	6	55.21	8	101.72	7	156.93
Oct 3–5, 2023	(China) 2023 Shanghai Trophy	3	60.93	2	131.08	3	192.01
Oct 20-22, 2023	(United States) 2023 Skate America	4	65.02	4	129.53	3	194.55
Nov 10–12, 2023	2023 Cup of China	4	62.58	4	125.46	4	188.04
Feb 15-18, 2024	(Estonia) 2024 Tallink Hotels Cup	3	59.27	4	108.55	4	167.82
Feb 22–25, 2024	(Netherlands) 2024 International Challenge Cup	7	51.57	5	110.61	5	162.18
Mar 18–24, 2024	(Canada) 2024 World Championships	7	66.23	18	110.30	16	176.53

Results in the 2024-25 season
Date	Event	SP		FS		Total	
Date	Event	P	Score	P	Score	P	Score
Sep 13–15, 2024	(Italy) 2024 CS Lombardia Trophy	7	60.73	7	104.26	7	164.98
Oct 16–20, 2024	(France) 2024 CS Trophée Métropole Nice Côte d'Azur	2	66.98	2	120.59	2	187.57
Nov 8–10, 2024	(Japan) 2024 NHK Trophy	11	52.98	8	112.86	10	165.84
Nov 15–17, 2024	(Finland) 2024 Finlandia Trophy	11	53.76	4	124.90	7	178.66
Dec 14–15, 2024	(Estonia) 2025 Estonian Championships	2	59.64	1	133.58	1	193.22
Jan 28 – Feb 2, 2025	(Estonia) 2025 European Championships	2	68.94	1	139.24	1	208.18
Feb 19–20, 2025	(Italy) 2025 Road to 26 Trophy	5	54.96	1	139.15	1	194.11
Mar 25–30, 2025	(United States) 2025 World Championships	12	65.58	8	131.09	8	196.67

Results in the 2025-26 season
Date	Event	SP		FS		Total	
Date	Event	P	Score	P	Score	P	Score
Sep 25–27, 2025	(Slovakia) 2025 CS Nepela Memorial	16	49.10	7	113.22	8	162.32
Nov 25–30, 2025	(Estonia) 2025 CS Tallinn Trophy	5	58.86	3	119.75	4	178.61
Dec 13–14, 2025	(Estonia) 2026 Estonian Championships	1	67.08	1	127.34	1	194.42
Jan 13–18, 2026	(United Kingdom) 2026 European Championships	1	70.61	1	145.53	1	216.14
Feb 17–19, 2026	(Italy) 2026 Winter Olympics	10	69.63	6	141.19	7	210.82
Mar 24–29, 2026	(Czech Republic) 2026 World Championships	11	67.29	6	134.98	7	202.27

Results in the 2026-27 season
Date	Event	SP		FS		Total	
Date	Event	P	Score	P	Score	P	Score
Sep 11–13, 2026	(Estonia) 2026 Tallinn Open	1	72.67	1	134.46	1	207.13
Sep 17–20, 2026	(Italy) 2026 CS Lombardia Trophy	1	77.20	2	133.21	1	210.41
Oct 1-4, 2026	(Georgia (country)) 2026 CS Trialeti Trophy	1	74.69	2	131.25	1	205.94
Oct 30–Nov 1, 2026	2026 Skate Canada International	3	77.24	2	143.83	2	221.07
Nov 20–22, 2026	(Finland) 2026 Finlandia Trophy	2	69.08	2	144.98	2	214.06

=== Junior level ===
2022–2023 season
Date	Event	SP	FS	Total
February 27 – March 5, 2023	2023 World Junior Championships	15; 55.67	12; 111.81	12; 167.48
February 4–5, 2023	2023 Estonian Junior Championships	1; 65.49	1; 124.15	1; 189.64
2021–2022 season
Date	Event	SP	FS	Total
April 13–17, 2022	2022 World Junior Championships	6; 65.90	10; 107.59	9; 173.49
February 5–6, 2022	2022 Estonian Junior Championships	1; 61.86	1; 120.27	1; 182.13
October 7–9, 2021	2021 JGP Austria	6; 58.97	4; 118.09	4; 177.06
August 25–28, 2021	2021 JGP France II	4; 59.26	9; 86.06	7; 145.32
2019–2020 season
Date	Event	SP	FS	Total
March 2–8, 2020	2020 World Junior Championships	33; 46.56	-	33; 46.56
February 13–16, 2020	2020 Tallink Hotels Cup	1; 60.71	1; 113.71	1; 174.42
February 1–2, 2020	2020 Estonian Junior Championships	1; 61.17	1; 120.91	1; 182.08
November 11–17, 2019	2019 Tallinn Trophy	1; 56.65	1; 108.49	1; 165.14
October 14–17, 2019	2019 Ice Star	2; 56.62	3; 110.79	2; 167.41
September 18–21, 2019	2019 JGP Poland	9; 56.60	10; 100.30	10; 156.90
September 4–7, 2019	2019 JGP Latvia	11; 53.47	6; 113.36	6; 166.83
2018–2019 season
Date	Event	SP	FS	Total
February 22–24, 2019	2019 Tallink Hotels Cup	1; 50.48	1; 94.28	1; 144.76
January 5–6, 2019	2019 Estonian Junior Championships	2; 48.51	1; 102.69	2; 151.20
November 25 – December 1, 2018	2018 Tallinn Trophy	7; 40.54	3; 84.65	3; 125.19
November 6–11, 2018	2018 Volvo Open Cup	4; 47.69	3; 92.28	3; 139.97
September 26–29, 2018	2018 JGP Czech Republic	12; 48.91	9; 92.80	11; 141.71
2017–2018 season
Date	Event	SP	FS	Total
March 15–18, 2018	2018 Tallink Hotels Cup	1; 52.54	1; 97.19	1; 149.73
February 2–4, 2018	2018 Estonian Junior Championships	3; 44.86	2; 86.86	3; 130.92
