= Trophée Métropole Nice Côte d'Azur =

International figure skating competition

- Status: Active
- Genre: International competition
- Frequency: Annual
- Venue: Palais des sports Jean-Bouin
- Location: Nice
- Country: France
- Inaugurated: 1995
- Previous event: 2025
- Next event: 2026
- Organizer: French Federation of Ice Sports; Nice Baie des Anges Association

The Trophée Métropole Nice Côte d'Azur is an annual figure skating competition sanctioned by the International Skating Union (ISU), organized and hosted by the French Federation of Ice Sports (French: Fédération Française des Sports de Glace) and the Nice Baie des Anges Association at the Palais des sports Jean-Bouin in Nice, France. Originally known as the International Cup of Nice (French: Coupe Internationale de Nice), it was held from 1995 to 2017; and then returned in 2021 with its new name. In 2024, it was a part of the ISU Challenger Series. Medals may be awarded in men's singles, women's singles, pair skating, and ice dance at the senior and junior levels; and as part of the Challenger Series, skaters earn points towards the World Standings and Season's World Ranking based on their results.

Adam Siao Him Fa of France holds the record for winning the most titles in men's singles (with four), while Léa Serna of France holds the most titles in women's singles (with three). Yuko Kavaguti and Alexander Smirnov of Russia hold the record in pair skating (with three), while Penny Coomes and Nicholas Buckland of Great Britain, and Juulia Turkkila and Matthias Versluis of Finland, are tied for winning the most titles in ice dance (with two each).

== History ==
The International Cup of Nice was launched in 1995 by the Nice Baie des Anges Association to promote figure skating and ice dance.

In 2024, the Trophée Métropole Nice Côte d'Azur was the seventh event of the ISU Challenger Series, a series of international figure skating competitions sanctioned by the International Skating Union (ISU). The objective is to ensure consistent organization and structure within a series of international competitions linked together, providing opportunities for senior-level skaters to compete at the international level and also earn points towards the World Standings and Season's World Ranking.

== Senior medalists ==
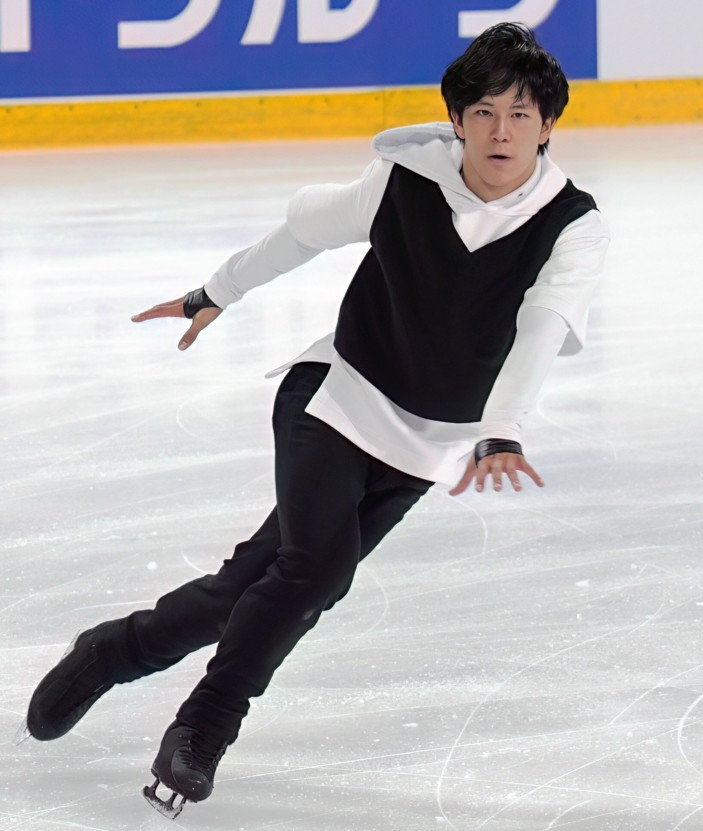
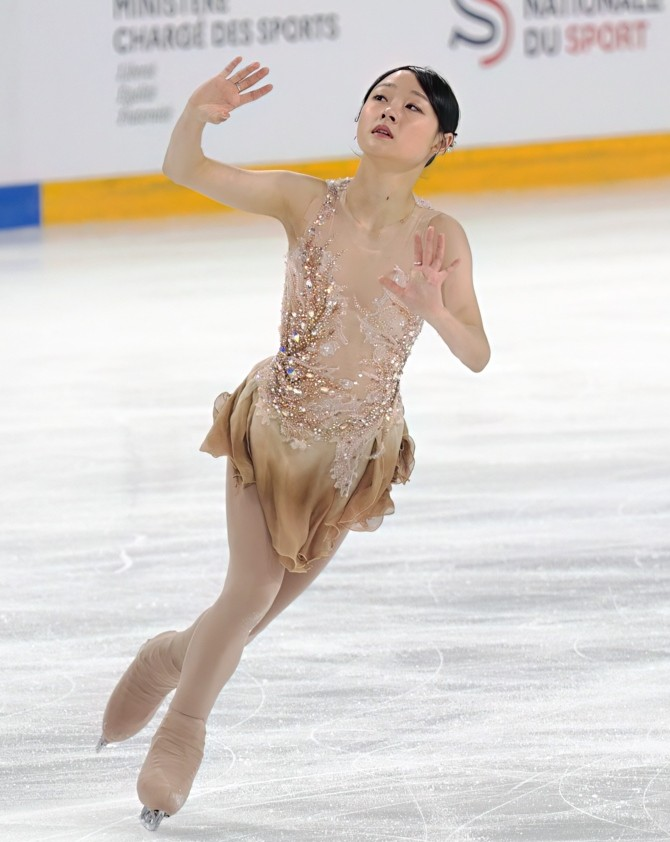
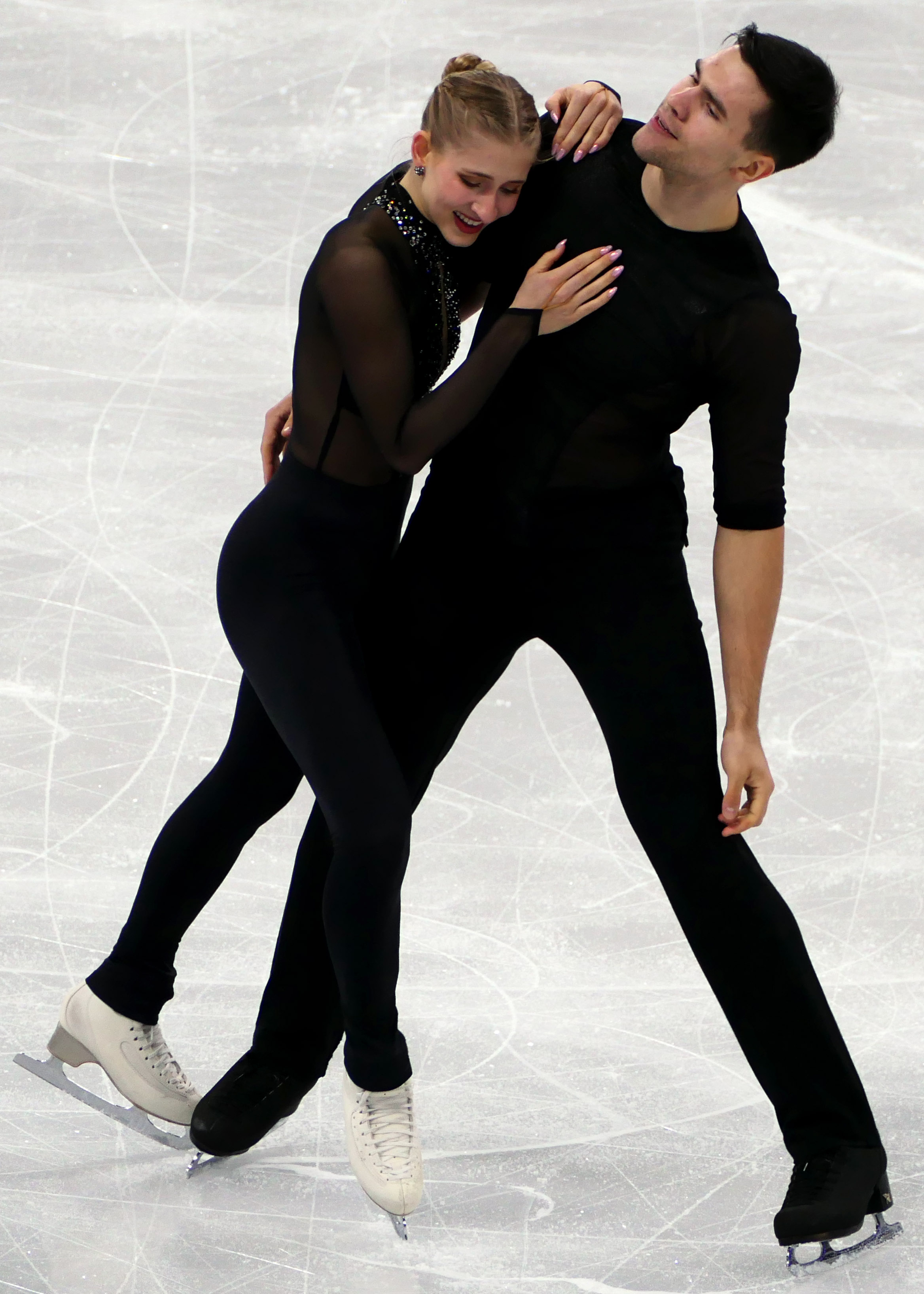
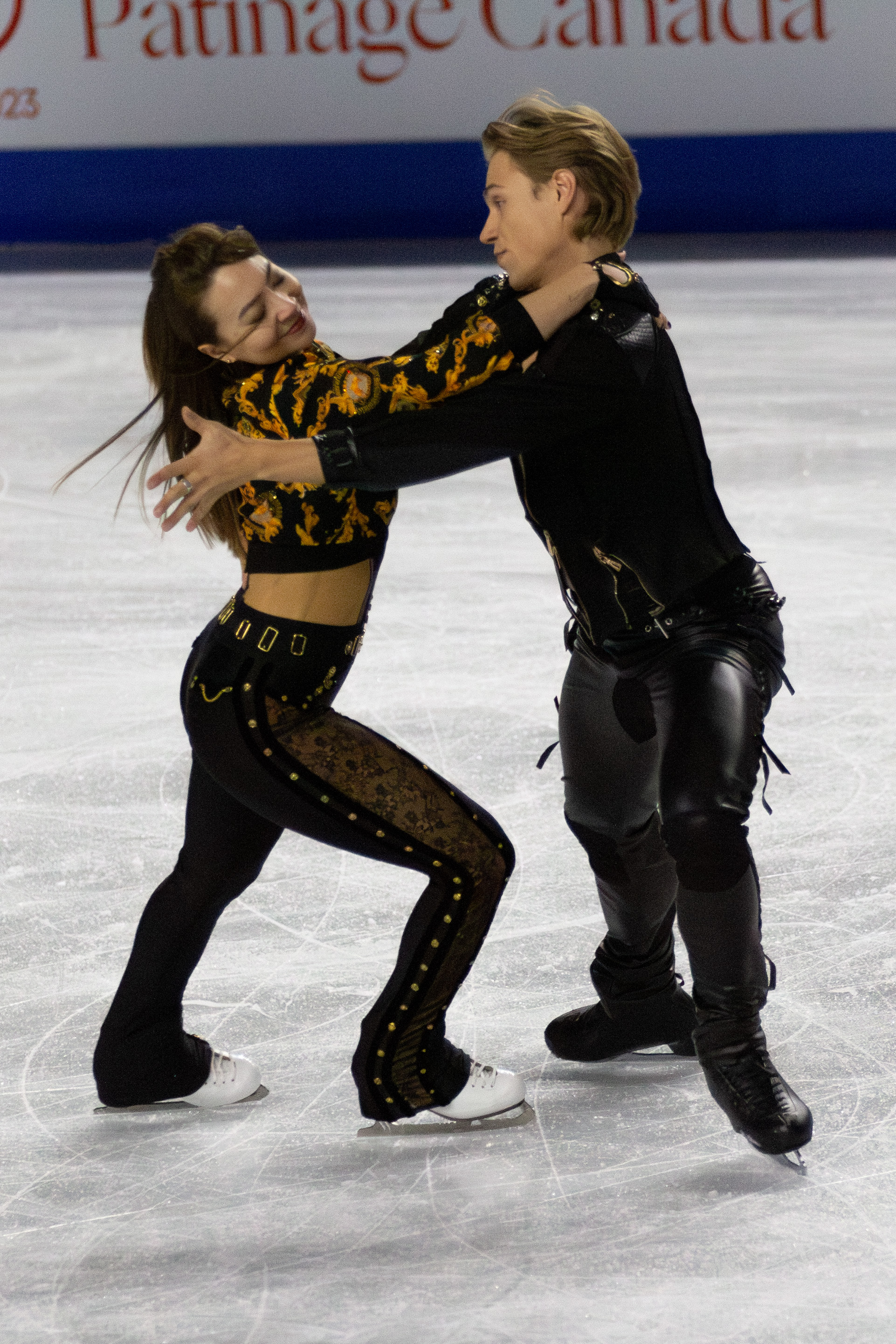
The 2024 Trophée Métropole Nice Côte d'Azur champions (from left to right): Adam Siao Him Fa of France (men's singles); Kim Chae-yeon of South Korea (women's singles); Minerva Fabienne Hase and Nikita Volodin of Germany (pair skating); and Allison Reed and Saulius Ambrulevičius of Lithuania (ice dance)

CS: Challenger Series event

=== Men's singles ===
Men's event medalists
Year	Gold	Silver	Bronze	Ref.
1995	(France) Terence Besnier			
1996	(France) Terence Besnier			
1997	(Russia) Oleg Tataurov			
1998	(France) Terence Besnier			
1999	(Russia) Anton Smirnov			
2000	(Germany) David Jäschke	(France) Grégory Reverdiau	(Russia) Andrei Griazev	
2001	(France) Samuel Contesti			
2002	(Russia) Konstantin Menshov	(France) Baptiste Porquet	(France) Grégory Reverdiau	
2003	(France) Damien Djordjevic	(France) Baptiste Porquet	(France) Samuel Contesti	
2004	(Russia) Andrei Griazev	(France) Samuel Contesti	(France) Stanick Jeannette	
2005	No competition held			
2006	(Russia) Andrei Lutai	(Poland) Przemysław Domański	(Sweden) Adrian Schultheiss	
2007	(France) Yannick Ponsero	(Russia) Konstantin Menshov	(France) Jérémie Colot	
2008	(France) Yannick Ponsero	(France) Alban Préaubert	(Slovakia) Igor Macypura	
2009	(Russia) Artur Gachinski	(France) Alban Préaubert	(Spain) Javier Fernández	
2010	(Russia) Artur Gachinski	(Russia) Konstantin Menshov	(France) Alban Préaubert	
2011	(United States) Keegan Messing	(France) Chafik Besseghier	(Russia) Konstantin Menshov	
2012	(United States) Keegan Messing	(United States) Max Aaron	(Germany) Peter Liebers	
2013	(Czech Republic) Tomáš Verner	(Russia) Konstantin Menshov	(Russia) Zhan Bush	
2014	(Russia) Alexander Petrov	(Russia) Artur Dmitriev Jr.	(Japan) Keiji Tanaka	
2015	(France) Chafik Besseghier	(Sweden) Alexander Majorov	(Russia) Dmitri Aliev	
2016	(France) Chafik Besseghier	(Russia) Anton Shulepov	(Russia) Makar Ignatov	
2017	(China) Yan Han	(Belgium) Jorik Hendrickx	(Germany) Peter Liebers	
2020	Competition cancelled due to the COVID-19 pandemic			
2021	(France) Luc Economides	(France) Romain Ponsart	(Monaco) Davide Lewton Brain	
2022	(France) Adam Siao Him Fa	(France) Luc Economides	(Monaco) Davide Lewton Brain	
2023	(France) Adam Siao Him Fa	(France) François Pitot	(France) Corentin Spinar	
2024 CS	(France) Adam Siao Him Fa	(Switzerland) Lukas Britschgi	(Estonia) Mihhail Selevko	
2025	(France) Adam Siao Him Fa	(France) Sammy Hammi	(Monaco) Davide Lewton Brain	

=== Women's singles ===
Women's event medalists
Year	Gold	Silver	Bronze	Ref.
1995	(Poland) Magda Gorska			
1996	(Switzerland) Vania Spechia			
1997	(Russia) Ekatarina Siniapkina			
1998	(Poland) Rita Chałubińska			
1999	(Germany) Zoya Douchine			
2000	(Germany) Veronika Diewald	(Russia) Tatiana Basova	(Germany) Angela Diewald	
2001	(Poland) Sabina Wojtala			
2002	(Russia) Tatiana Basova	(Poland) Anna Jurkiewicz	(Germany) Veronika Diewald	
2003	(Russia) Angelina Turenko	(France) Vanessa Gusméroli	(Italy) Martina Sasanelli	
2004	(France) Anne-Sophie Calvez	(Luxembourg) Fleur Maxwell	(Russia) Alima Gershkovich	
2005	No competition held			
2006	(Hungary) Viktória Pavuk	(Finland) Henriikka Hietaniemi	(Sweden) Viktoria Helgesson	
2007	(Hungary) Viktória Pavuk	(Poland) Anna Jurkiewicz	(United Kingdom) Vanessa James	
2008	(Germany) Constanze Paulinus	(Russia) Alena Leonova	(Italy) Stefania Berton	
2009	(Russia) Ksenia Makarova	(Italy) Valentina Marchei	(Japan) Haruka Imai	
2010	(Russia) Alena Leonova	(Italy) Valentina Marchei	(France) Maé-Bérénice Méité	
2011	(Russia) Polina Agafonova	(Ukraine) Natalia Popova	(Russia) Anna Ovcharova	
2012	(Russia) Polina Korobeynikova	(Sweden) Isabelle Olsson	(Russia) Kristina Zaseeva	
2013	(Russia) Maria Artemieva	(United States) Kiri Baga	(Germany) Nathalie Weinzierl	
2014	(Russia) Elizaveta Tuktamysheva	(Japan) Miyabi Oba	(Sweden) Isabelle Olsson	
2015	(Russia) Elizaveta Tuktamysheva	(Russia) Alena Leonova	(France) Laurine Lecavelier	
2016	(France) Maé-Bérénice Méité	(Belgium) Loena Hendrickx	(France) Laurine Lecavelier	
2017	(Russia) Alisa Fedichkina	(China) Li Xiangning	(Ukraine) Anna Khnychenkova	
2020	Competition cancelled due to the COVID-19 pandemic			
2021	(France) Léa Serna	(Czech Republic) Eliška Březinová	(Romania) Julia Sauter	
2022	(France) Léa Serna	(Belgium) Jade Hovine	(France) Maïa Mazzara	
2023	(Finland) Emmi Peltonen	(Israel) Mariia Seniuk	(Bulgaria) Alexandra Feigin	
2024 CS	(South Korea) Kim Chae-yeon	(Estonia) Niina Petrõkina	(Canada) Fée Ann Landry	
2025	(France) Léa Serna	(Switzerland) Sara Franzi	(Bulgaria) Alexandra Feigin	

=== Pairs ===
The senior pairs' free skate at the 2024 Trophée Métropole Nice was cancelled on account of inclement weather. It was later announced that the short program results would be considered the final results for the competition.

Pairs event medalists
Year	Gold	Silver	Bronze	Ref.
No pairs competitions prior to 2002
2002	(Russia); Julia Karbovskaya; Sergei Slavnov	(Poland); Dominika Piątkowska; Marcin Świątek	No other competitors	
2003	(Russia); Tatiana Kokoreva; Egor Golovkin	(Russia); Natalia Shestakova; Pavel Lebedev	(France); Sabrina Lefrançois; Jérôme Blanchard	
2004	(Russia); Maria Mukhortova; Maxim Trankov	(Germany); Aljona Savchenko; Robin Szolkowy	(Russia); Valeria Simakova; Anton Tokarev	
2005	No competition held			
2006	(Russia); Yuko Kavaguti; Alexander Smirnov	(France); Mélodie Chataigner; Medhi Bouzzine	(Italy); Laura Magitteri; Ondřej Hotárek	
2007	(Russia); Yuko Kavaguti; Alexander Smirnov	(France); Adeline Canac; Maximin Coia	(Germany); Mari Vartmann; Florian Just	
2008	(Russia); Yuko Kavaguti; Alexander Smirnov	(United States); Chloé Katz; Joseph Lynch	(France); Adeline Canac; Maximin Coia	
2009	(France); Adeline Canac; Maximin Coia	(Russia); Ksenia Ozerova; Alexander Enbert	(Ukraine); Kateryna Kostenko; Roman Talan	
2010	(Russia); Katarina Gerboldt; Alexander Enbert	(Italy); Nicole Della Monica; Yannick Kocon	(Russia); Tatiana Novik; Mikhail Kuznetsov	
2011	(Italy); Stefania Berton; Ondřej Hotárek	(Russia); Katarina Gerboldt; Alexander Enbert	(United States); Mary Beth Marley; Rockne Brubaker	
2012	(United States); Alexa Scimeca; Christopher Knierim	(Russia); Ksenia Stolbova; Fedor Klimov	(Italy); Nicole Della Monica; Matteo Guarise	
2013	(Germany); Annabelle Prölß; Ruben Blommaert	(United States); Jessica Calalang; Zack Sidhu	(Germany); Maylin Wende; Daniel Wende	
2014	(Italy); Nicole Della Monica; Matteo Guarise	(Russia); Vera Bazarova; Andrei Deputat	(Germany); Mari Vartmann; Aaron Van Cleave	
2015	(Germany); Mari Vartmann; Ruben Blommaert	(Austria); Miriam Ziegler; Severin Kiefer	(France); Camille Mendoza; Pavel Kovalev	
2016	(Czech Republic); Anna Dušková; Martin Bidař	(Austria); Miriam Ziegler; Severin Kiefer	(Italy); Rebecca Ghilardi; Filippo Ambrosini	
2017	(China); Yu Xiaoyu; Zhang Hao	(Germany); Annika Hocke; Ruben Blommaert	(South Korea); Kim Kyu-eun; Alex Kam	
2020	Competition cancelled due to the COVID-19 pandemic			
2021	(Spain); Laura Barquero; Marco Zandron	(Italy); Sara Conti; Niccolò Macii	(Spain); Dorota Broda; Pedro Betegón	
2022	(Italy); Irma Caldara; Riccardo Maglio	(Philippines); Isabella Gamez; Aleksandr Korovin	(France); Oxana Vouillamoz; Flavien Giniaux	
2023	(France); Oxana Vouillamoz; Flavien Giniaux	(France); Océane Piegad; Denys Strekalin	(Austria); Sophia Schaller; Livio Mayr	
2024	(Germany); Minerva Fabienne Hase; Nikita Volodin	(Philippines); Isabella Gamez; Aleksandr Korovin	(France); Louise Ehrhard; Matthis Pellegris	
2025	No pairs competition			

=== Ice dance ===
Ice dance event medalists
Year	Gold	Silver	Bronze	Ref.
No ice dance competitions prior to 2009
2009	(France); Chloé Ibanez; Marien de la Asuncion	(Finland); Henna Lindholm; Ossi Kanervo	No other competitors	
2010	(France); Pernelle Carron; Lloyd Jones	(Italy); Lorenza Alessandrini; Simone Vaturi	(United Kingdom); Penny Coomes; Nicholas Buckland	
2011	(Russia); Valeria Starygina; Ivan Volobuiev	(France); Pernelle Carron; Lloyd Jones	(Spain); Sara Hurtado; Adrián Díaz	
2012	(Russia); Ksenia Monko; Kirill Khaliavin	(Russia); Valeria Starygina; Ivan Volobuiev	(Estonia); Irina Štork; Taavi Rand	
2013	(France); Gabriella Papadakis; Guillaume Cizeron	(Italy); Lorenza Alessandrini; Simone Vaturi	(Russia); Ksenia Monko; Kirill Khaliavin	
2014	(United Kingdom); Penny Coomes; Nicholas Buckland	(United Kingdom); Olivia Smart; Joseph Buckland	(Ukraine); Lolita Yermak; Oleksii Shumskyi	
2015	(Finland); Cecilia Törn; Jussiville Partanen	(France); Lorenza Alessandrini; Pierre Souquet	(Canada); Carolane Soucisse; Simon Tanguay	
2016	(France); Marie-Jade Lauriault; Romain Le Gac	(Germany); Katharina Müller; Tim Dieck	(Ukraine); Oleksandra Nazarova; Maksym Nikitin	
2017	(United Kingdom); Penny Coomes; Nicholas Buckland	(China); Wang Shiyue; Liu Xinyu	(France); Marie-Jade Lauriault; Romain Le Gac	
2020	Competition cancelled due to the COVID-19 pandemic			
2021	(Finland); Juulia Turkkila; Matthias Versluis	(France); Evgeniia Lopareva; Geoffrey Brissaud	(France); Loïcia Demougeot; Théo le Mercier	
2022	(Finland); Juulia Turkkila; Matthias Versluis	(France); Marie Dupayage; Thomas Nabais	(France); Natacha Lagouge; Arnaud Caffa	
2023	(Spain); Sofía Val; Asaf Kazimov	(Lithuania); Paulina Ramanauskaitė; Deividas Kizala	(China); Zizi Xiao; Linghao He	
2024 CS	(Lithuania); Allison Reed; Saulius Ambrulevičius	(United States); Caroline Green; Michael Parsons	(United States); Eva Pate; Logan Bye	
2025	(Czech Republic); Natálie Taschlerová; Filip Taschler	(United Kingdom); Phebe Bekker; James Hernandez	(Italy); Carlotta Argentieri; Francesco Riva	

== Junior medalists ==
=== Men's singles ===
Junior men's event medalists
Year	Gold	Silver	Bronze	Ref.
2003	(France) Yannick Ponsero	(Russia) Andrei Lutai	(France) Jérémie Colot	
2004	(France) Jérémie Colot	(Russia) Andrei Lutai	(France) Yannick Kocon	
2005	No competition held			
2006	(Russia) Nikita Mikhailov	(France) Christopher Boyadji	(Italy) Marco Fabbri	
2007	(Russia) Artur Gachinski	(Russia) Nikita Mikhailov	(Switzerland) Mikael Redin	
2008	(France) Mark Vaillant	(Spain) Javier Raya	(France) Chafik Besseghier	
2009	(Belgium) Jorik Hendrickx	(Russia) Artur Dmitriev Jr.	(France) Paul Emmanuel Richardeau	
2010	(Russia) Vladislav Tarasenko	(France) Simon Hocquaux	(France) Quentin Lourenço	
2011	(Russia) Vladislav Tarasenko	(Ukraine) Stanislav Pertsov	(France) Charles Tetar	
2012	(Russia) Alexander Petrov	(Russia) Artem Lezheev	(France) Simon Hocquaux	
2013	(Latvia) Deniss Vasiļjevs	(Ukraine) Ivan Pavlov	(Russia) Andrei Zuber	
2014	(Russia) Andrei Lazukin	(Russia) Dmitri Shutkov	(France) Kévin Aymoz	
2015	(Russia) Petr Gumennik	(Russia) Egor Murashov	(Czech Republic) Petr Kotlařík	
2016	(Russia) Egor Murashov	(France) Adam Siao Him Fa	(Sweden) Gabriel Folkesson	
2017	(Czech Republic) Matyáš Bělohradský	(France) Landry Le May	(Turkey) Başar Oktar	
2020	Competition cancelled due to the COVID-19 pandemic			
2021	(France) François Pitot	(France) Corentin Spinar	(Italy) Emanuele Indelicato	
2022	(France) François Pitot	(France) Ilia Gogitidze	(Turkey) Ali Efe Günes	
2023	(Italy) Matteo Nalbone	(France) Ilia Gogitidze	(France) Gianni Motilla	
2024	(Canada) Parker Heiderich	(United States) Lorenzo Elano	(United States) Nicholas Brooks	
2025	(Switzerland) Gion Schmid	(Germany) Leon Rojkov	(France) Daniel Verbat	

=== Women's singles ===
Junior women's event medalists
Year	Gold	Silver	Bronze	Ref.
2003	(Russia) Daria Krivenko	(Italy) Valeria Leoni	(Italy) Christianna Di Natale	
2004	(Russia) Ksenia Doronina	(Japan) Mutsumi Takayama	(Sweden) Josephine Ringdahl	
2005	No competition held			
2006	(Russia) Alena Leonova	(Italy) Nicole Della Monica	(Sweden) Joshi Helgesson	
2007	(Russia) Alena Leonova	(Austria) Miriam Ziegler	(Switzerland) Noémie Silberer	
2008	(France) Sandra Sitbon	(Sweden) Malin Taljegård	(Russia) Maria Artemieva	
2009	(Japan) Karen Kemanai	(Russia) Maria Artemieva	(Belgium) Ira Vannut	
2010	(Russia) Elizaveta Tuktamysheva	(France) Lénaëlle Gilleron-Gorry	(Russia) Nikol Gosviani	
2011	(Russia) Maria Stavitskaia	(France) Anaïs Ventard	(Russia) Arina Petrova	
2012	(Russia) Maria Stavitskaia	(France) Laurine Lecavelier	(Finland) Jenni Saarinen	
2013	(Russia) Natalia Ogoreltceva	(Russia) Svetlana Lebedeva	(Czech Republic) Anna Dušková	
2014	(Kazakhstan) Elizabet Tursynbaeva	(France) Marina Popov	(United Kingdom) Danielle Harrison	
2015	(Russia) Alisa Fedichkina	(Czech Republic) Dahyun Ko	(Ukraine) Kim Cheremsky	
2016	(Russia) Alisa Fedichkina	(Hong Kong) Yi Christy Leung	(France) Julie Froetscher	
2017	(Russia) Anastasiia Gubanova	(Russia) Mariia Talalaikina	(Italy) Alessia Tornaghi	
2020	Competition cancelled due to the COVID-19 pandemic			
2021	(Switzerland) Kimmy Repond	(Switzerland) Livia Kaiser	(Poland) Noelle Streuli	
2022	(Italy) Elena Agostinelli	(Poland) Noelle Streuli	(Finland) Anna Bergström	
2023	(Finland) Iida Karhunen	(Switzerland) Olivia Bacsa	(Switzerland) Leandra Tzimpoukakis	
2024	(France) Stefania Gladki	(Canada) Reese Rose	(Latvia) Kira Baranovska	
2025	(Estonia) Elina Goidina	(Switzerland) Valeriya Ezhova	(France) Stefania Gladki	

=== Pairs ===
Junior pairs event medalists
Year	Gold	Silver	Bronze	Ref.
2003	(Russia); Maria Mukhortova; Maxim Trankov	(Poland); Joanna Dusik; Patryk Szałaśny	(Poland); Julia Szczerbowska; Łucasz Chluba	
2004	(Russia); Tatiana Kokoreva; Egor Golovkin	(Russia); Ekaterina Sheremetieva; Mikhail Kuznetsov	No other competitors	
2005–20	No junior pairs competitions			
2021	(France); Oxana Vouillamoz; Flavien Giniaux	No other competitors		
2022	(France); Louise Ehrhard; Matthis Pellegris	(Germany); Katalin Janne Salatzki; Lukas Röseler	(Spain); Inés Moudden; Alejandro Lázaro García	
2023	(Italy); Irina Napolitano; Edoardo Comi	(France); Romane Télémaque; Lucas Coulon	(Canada); Beau Callahan; Christophe Roch	
2024–25	No junior pairs competition			

=== Ice dance ===
Junior ice dance event medalists
Year	Gold	Silver	Bronze	Ref.
No junior ice dance competitions prior to 2021
2021	(Czech Republic); Kateřina Mrázková; Daniel Mrázek	(France); Eva Bernard; Tom Jochum	(Italy); Noemi Maria Tali; Stefano Frasca	
2022	(France); Célina Fradji; Jean-Hans Fourneaux	(France); Louise Bordet; Thomas Gipoulou	(Italy); Giorgia Galimberti; Matteo-Libasse Mandelli	
2023	(France); Ambre Perrier Gianesini; Samuel Blanc Klaperman	(France); Dania Mouaden; Théo Bigot	(United Kingdom); Ashlie Slatter; Atl Ongay-Perez	
2024	(France); Célina Fradji; Jean-Hans Fourneaux	(France); Louise Bordet; Martin Chardain	(United States); Emily Renzi; William Lissauer	
2025	(France); Eryn Alavera; Nikolai Balabardin	(France); Romy Reverchon; Victor di Muzio	(United Kingdom); Annabel Mann; Jack Hammond	

== Records ==
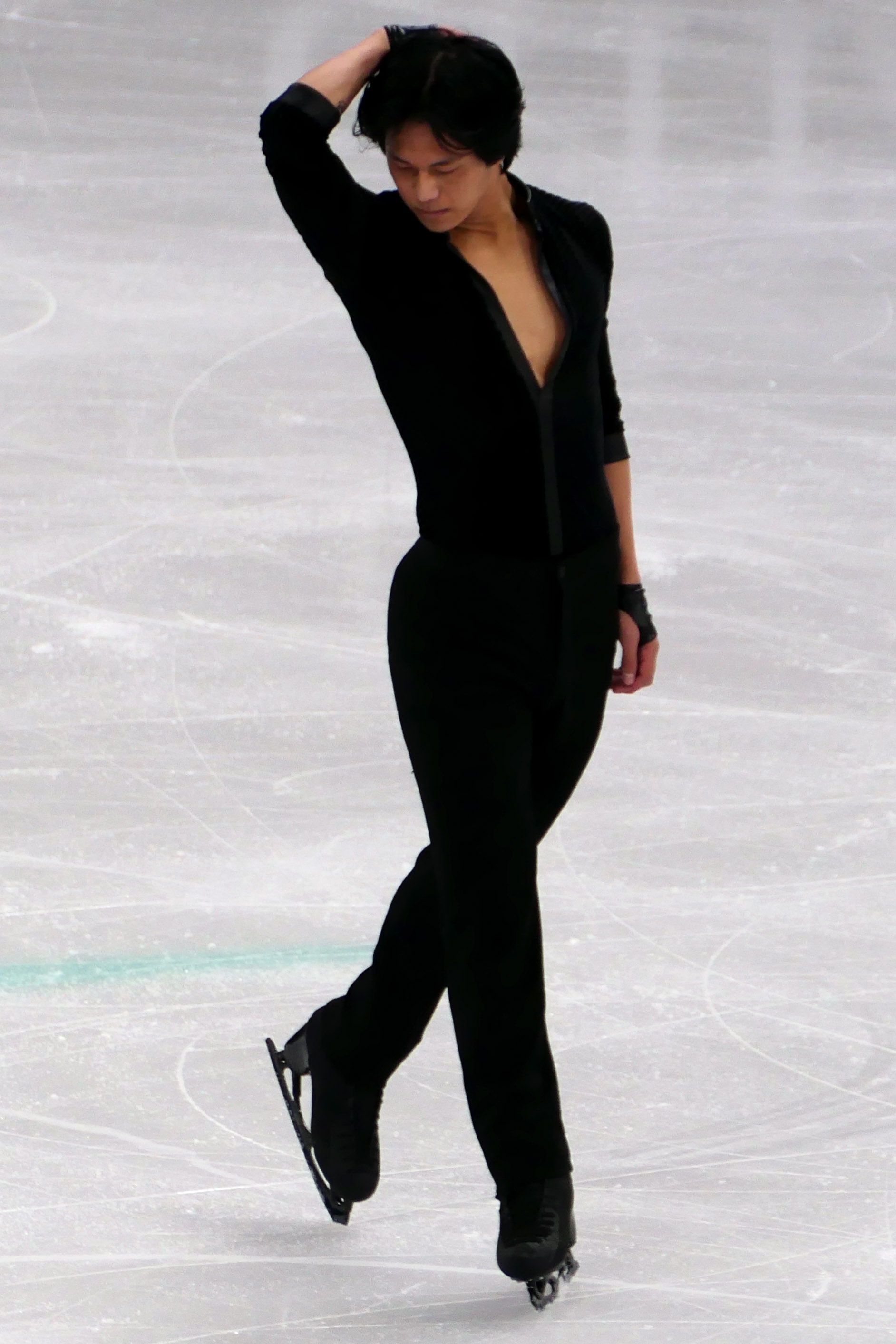
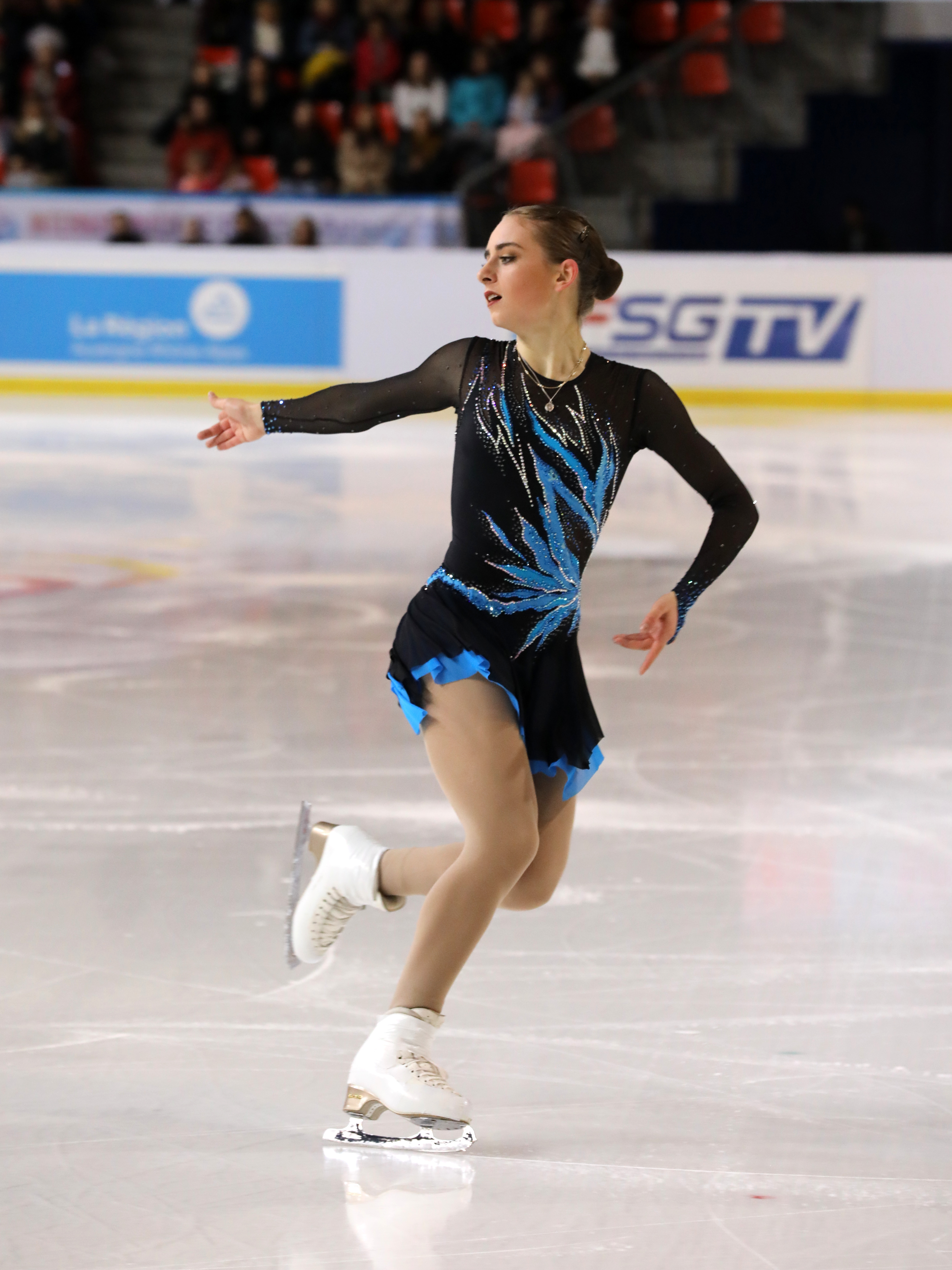
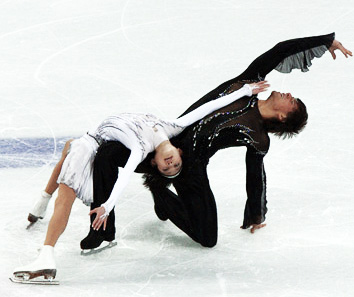
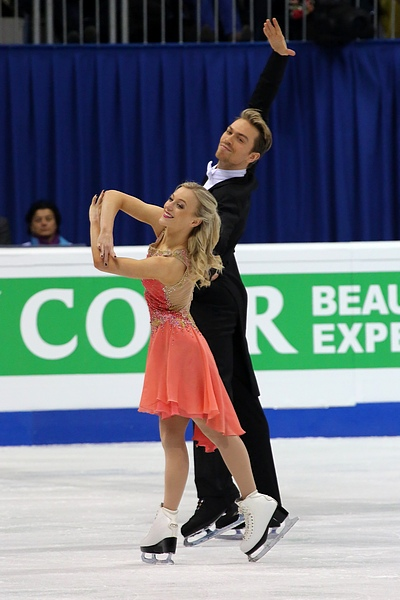
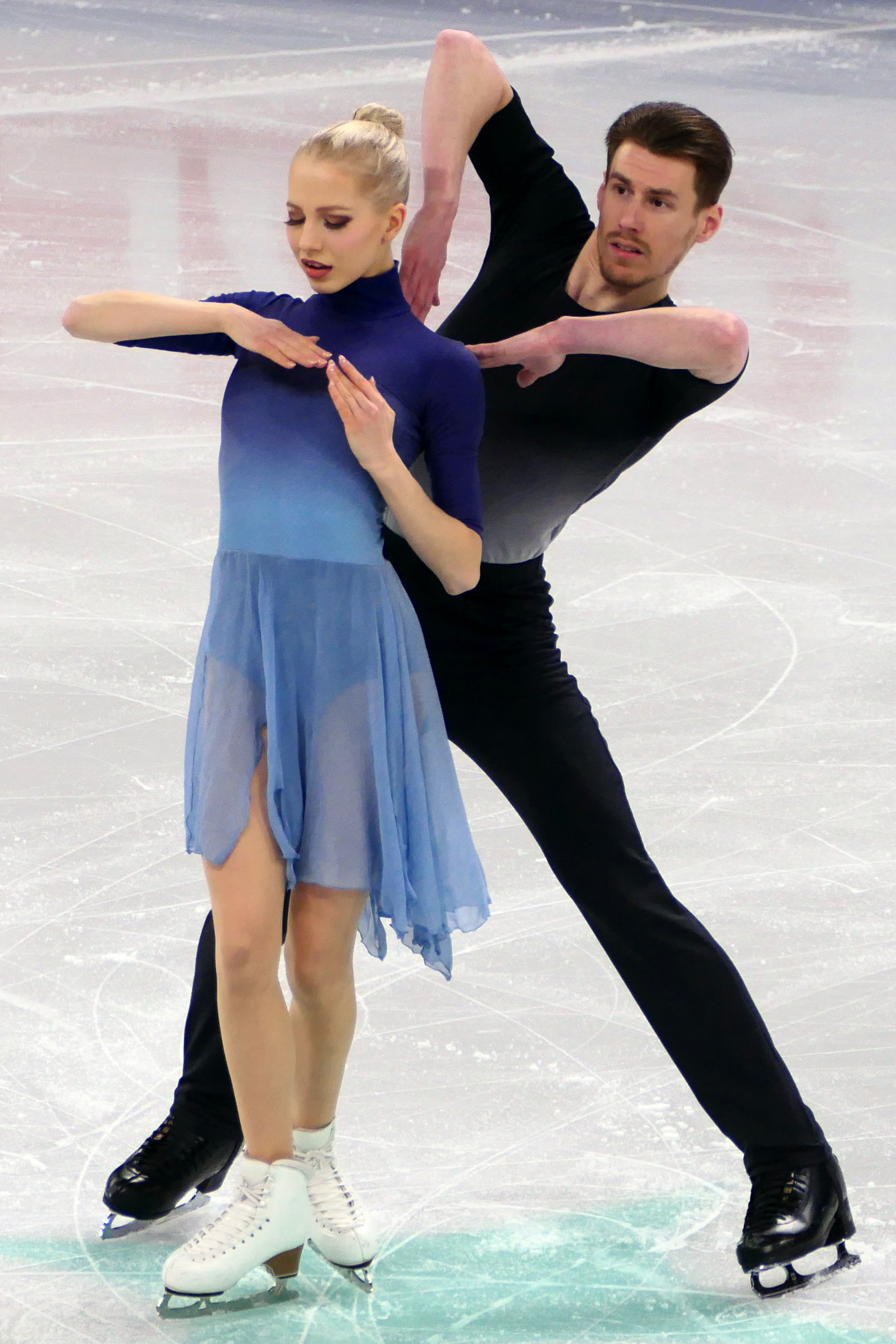
From left to right: Adam Siao Him Fa of France has won three Trophée Métropole Nice titles in men's singles; Léa Serna of France has won three Trophée Métropole Nice titles in women's singles; Yuko Kavaguti and Alexander Smirnov of Russia have won three Trophée Métropole Nice titles in pair skating; Penny Coomes and Nicholas Buckland of Great Britain, and Juulia Turkkila and Matthias Versluis of Finland, have won two Trophée Métropole Nice titles in ice dance.

Records
Discipline	Most titles			
Discipline	Skater(s)	No.	Years	Ref.
Men's singles	(France); Adam Siao Him Fa	4	2022–25	
Women's singles	(France); Léa Serna	3	2021–22; 2025	
Pairs	(Russia); Yuko Kavaguti; Alexander Smirnov	3	2006–08	
Ice dance	(United Kingdom); Penny Coomes; Nicholas Buckland	2	2014; 2017	
Ice dance	(Finland); Juulia Turkkila; Matthias Versluis	2	2021–22	

== Cumulative medal count (senior medalists) ==
=== Men's singles ===
Total number of TMN medals in men's singles by nation
Rank	Nation	Gold	Silver	Bronze	Total
1	France	14	11	6	31
2	Russia	8	5	5	18
3	United States	2	1	0	3
4	Germany	1	0	2	3
5	China	1	0	0	1
5	Czech Republic	1	0	0	1
7	Sweden	0	1	1	2
8	Belgium	0	1	0	1
8	Poland	0	1	0	1
8	Switzerland	0	1	0	1
11	Monaco	0	0	3	3
12	Estonia	0	0	1	1
12	Japan	0	0	1	1
12	Slovakia	0	0	1	1
12	Spain	0	0	1	1
Totals (15 entries)		27	21	21	69

=== Women's singles ===
Total number of TMN medals in women's singles by nation
Rank	Nation	Gold	Silver	Bronze	Total
1	Russia	11	3	3	17
2	France	5	1	4	10
3	Poland	3	2	0	5
4	Germany	3	0	3	6
5	Hungary	2	0	0	2
6	Finland	1	1	0	2
6	Switzerland	1	1	0	2
8	South Korea	1	0	0	1
9	Italy	0	2	2	4
10	Belgium	0	2	0	2
11	Sweden	0	1	2	3
12	Japan	0	1	1	2
12	Ukraine	0	1	1	2
14	China	0	1	0	1
14	Czech Republic	0	1	0	1
14	Estonia	0	1	0	1
14	Israel	0	1	0	1
14	Luxembourg	0	1	0	1
14	United States	0	1	0	1
20	Bulgaria	0	0	2	2
21	Canada	0	0	1	1
21	Great Britain	0	0	1	1
21	Romania	0	0	1	1
Totals (23 entries)		27	21	21	69

=== Pairs ===
Total number of TMN medals in pairs by nation
Rank	Nation	Gold	Silver	Bronze	Total
1	Russia	7	5	2	14
2	Germany	3	2	3	8
2	Italy	3	2	3	8
4	France	2	3	5	10
5	United States	1	2	1	4
6	Spain	1	0	1	2
7	China	1	0	0	1
7	Czech Republic	1	0	0	1
9	Austria	0	2	1	3
10	Philippines	0	2	0	2
11	Poland	0	1	0	1
12	South Korea	0	0	1	1
12	Ukraine	0	0	1	1
Totals (13 entries)		19	19	18	56

=== Ice dance ===
Total number of TMN medals in ice dance by nation
Rank	Nation	Gold	Silver	Bronze	Total
1	France	4	4	3	11
2	Finland	3	1	0	4
3	Great Britain	2	2	1	5
4	Russia	2	1	1	4
5	Lithuania	1	1	0	2
6	Spain	1	0	1	2
7	Czech Republic	1	0	0	1
8	Italy	0	2	1	3
9	China	0	1	1	2
9	United States	0	1	1	2
11	Germany	0	1	0	1
12	Ukraine	0	0	2	2
13	Canada	0	0	1	1
13	Estonia	0	0	1	1
Totals (14 entries)		14	14	13	41

=== Total medals ===
Total number of TMN medals by nation
Rank	Nation	Gold	Silver	Bronze	Total
1	Russia	28	14	11	53
2	France	25	19	18	62
3	Germany	7	3	8	18
4	Finland	4	2	0	6
5	Italy	3	6	6	15
6	United States	3	5	2	10
7	Poland	3	4	0	7
8	Czech Republic	3	1	0	4
9	Great Britain	2	2	2	6
10	China	2	2	1	5
11	Spain	2	0	3	5
12	Hungary	2	0	0	2
13	Switzerland	1	2	0	3
14	Lithuania	1	1	0	2
15	South Korea	1	0	1	2
16	Belgium	0	3	0	3
17	Sweden	0	2	3	5
18	Austria	0	2	1	3
19	Philippines	0	2	0	2
20	Ukraine	0	1	4	5
21	Estonia	0	1	2	3
21	Japan	0	1	2	3
23	Israel	0	1	0	1
23	Luxembourg	0	1	0	1
25	Monaco	0	0	3	3
26	Bulgaria	0	0	2	2
26	Canada	0	0	2	2
28	Romania	0	0	1	1
28	Slovakia	0	0	1	1
Totals (29 entries)		87	75	73	235
