= Medhi Bouzzine =

French former pair skater

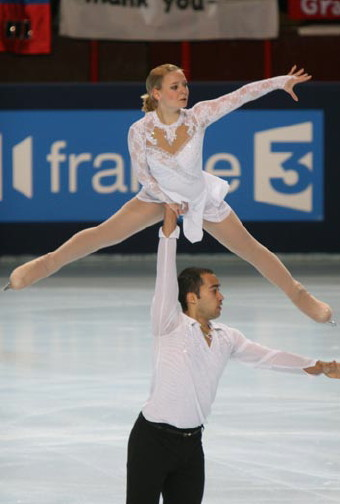
- Mélodie Chataigner and Medhi Bouzzine

Personal information
- Full name: Medhi Bouzzine
- Born: 9 February 1984 (age 42) Paris
- Height: 1.74 m (5 ft 9 in)

Figure skating career
- Country: France
- Partner: Mélodie Chataigner
- Skating club: Club des Francais Volants
- Began skating: 1990
- Retired: 2011

Medhi Bouzzine (born 9 February 1984) is a French former pair skater. He competed with Mélodie Chataigner from 2005 to 2011, winning six French national medals and placing 8th at the 2008 European Championships.

== Programs ==
(with Chataigner)

Season	Short program	Free skating
2009–2010	36 Quai des Orfèvres by Erwan Kermovant	Overcome by Maxime Rodriguez
2008–2009	36 Quai des Orfèvres by Erwan Kermovant	Concerto de l'adieu (from Dien Bien Phu) by Georges Delerue
2007–2008	La Terre vue du ciel by Armand Amar	Poeta by Vicente Amigo
2006–2007	Clubbed to Death by Rob Dougan	The Untouchables by Ennio Morricone

== Competitive highlights ==
(with Chataigner)

Results
International
Event	2005–06	2006–07	2007–08	2008–09	2009–10	2010–11
European Championships			8th			
GP Trophée Eric Bompard		8th		8th		
Cup of Nice		2nd	4th	7th		
NRW Trophy						6th
National
French Championships	3rd	3rd	2nd	2nd	3rd	2nd
Master's de Patinage			2nd			
GP = Grand Prix
