= Corentin Spinar =

French figure skater

Personal information
- Born: 14 May 2003 (age 23) Beaumont, France
- Home town: Annecy, France

Figure skating career
- Country: France
- Discipline: Men's singles
- Coach: Didier Lucine; Sophie Golaz; Mérovée Ephrem
- Skating club: Annecy
- Began skating: 2008

Corentin Spinar (born 14 May 2003) is a French figure skater. He is the 2026 CS Lombardia Trophy bronze medalist. He competed at the 2022 World Junior Figure Skating Championships.

== Competitive highlights ==
- JGP – Event of the ISU Junior Grand Prix Series

Competition placements at senior level
Season	2021–22	2022–23	2023–24	2024–25	2025-26	2026-27
French Championships		7th	9th	4th	7th	
CS Trophée Métropole Nice				13th		
CS Lombardia Trophy					12th	3rd
Challenge Cup		16th				
Coupe du Printemps			2nd	2nd	7th	
Denkova-Staviski Cup				5th		2nd
Dragon Trophy	2nd	6th	2nd			
Golden Bear of Zagreb						3rd
Master's de Patinage			8th	3rd	7th	5th
Merano Trophy			6th	10th	3rd	
Open d'Andorra		3rd				
Santa Claus Cup		7th				
Trophée Métropole Nice			3rd		5th	
Volvo Open Cup			5th			

Competition placements at junior level
Season	2017–18	2018–19	2019–20	2021–22
World Junior Championships				17th
French Championships	12th	10th	6th	1st
JGP France			18th	8th
Bavarian Open				4th
Budapest Trophy				3rd
IceLab Cup				3rd
Master's de Patinage			6th	WD
Trophée Métropole Nice				2nd

== Detailed results ==
ISU personal best scores in the +5/-5 GOE System
Segment	Type	Score	Event
Total	TSS	247.66	2026 CS Lombardia Trophy
Short program	TSS	89.08	2026 CS Lombardia Trophy
Short program	TES	53.18	2026 CS Lombardia Trophy
Short program	PCS	35.90	2026 CS Lombardia Trophy
Free skating	TSS	158.58	2026 CS Lombardia Trophy
Free skating	TES	85.64	2026 CS Lombardia Trophy
Free skating	PCS	72.94	2026 CS Lombardia Trophy

=== Senior level ===
Results in the 2021–22 season
Date	Event	SP		FS		Total	
Date	Event	P	Score	P	Score	P	Score
Feb 10–13, 2022	(Slovenia) 2022 Dragon Trophy	2	63.39	2	116.03	2	179.42

Results in the 2022–23 season
Date	Event	SP		FS		Total	
Date	Event	P	Score	P	Score	P	Score
Nov 16–20, 2022	2022 Open d'Andorra	3	61.74	5	111.61	3	173.35
Nov 28 – Dec 4, 2022	(Hungary) 2022 Santa Claus Cup	6	62.80	6	120.22	7	183.02
Dec 15–17, 2022	(France) 2022 French Championships	10	61.45	7	127.40	7	188.85
Feb 9–12, 2023	(Slovenia) 2023 Dragon Trophy	7	62.87	6	100.36	6	163.23
Feb 23–26, 2023	(Netherlands) 2023 International Challenge Cup	16	57.05	15	115.37	16	172.42

Results in the 2023–24 season
Date	Event	SP		FS		Total	
Date	Event	P	Score	P	Score	P	Score
Sep 28–30, 2023	(France) 2023 Master's de Patinage	7	60.18	8	120.87	8	181.05
Oct 18–22, 2023	(France) 2023 Trophée Métropole Nice Côte d'Azur	3	71.62	3	128.27	3	199.89
Dec 10–14, 2023	(France) 2023 French Championships	11	61.25	8	112.18	9	173.43
Jan 18–21, 2024	(Latvia) 51st Volvo Open Cup	2	59.46	5	104.08	5	163.54
Feb 8–11, 2024	(Slovenia) 2024 Dragon Trophy	2	65.61	3	115.96	2	181.57
Feb 22–25, 2024	(Italy) 2024 Merano Ice Trophy	5	67.85	6	127.15	6	195.00
Mar 15-17, 2024	(Luxembourg) 2024 Coupe du Printemps	2	65.75	2	124.75	2	190.50

Results in the 2024–25 season
Date	Event	SP		FS		Total	
Date	Event	P	Score	P	Score	P	Score
Sep 26–28, 2024	(France) 2024 Master's de Patinage	4	72.83	3	133.74	3	206.57
Oct 16–20, 2024	(France) 2024 CS Trophée Métropole Nice Côte d'Azur	14	64.78	11	127.84	13	192.62
Nov 5-10, 2024	(Bulgaria) 2024 Denkova-Staviski Cup	5	65.47	6	124.09	5	189.56
Dec 20-21, 2024	(France) 2025 French Championships	4	69.50	6	133.66	4	203.16
Feb 13-16, 2025	(Italy) 2025 Merano Ice Trophy	12	53.76	7	124.25	10	178.01
Mar 14-16, 2025	(Luxembourg) 2025 Coupe du Printemps	2	62.05	2	115.92	2	177.97

Results in the 2025-26 season
Date	Event	SP		FS		Total	
Date	Event	P	Score	P	Score	P	Score
Aug 28-30, 2025	(France) 2025 Master's de Patinage	6	71.38	8	104.16	7	175.54
Sep 11–14, 2025	(Italy) 2025 CS Lombardia Trophy	12	70.48	12	124.40	12	194.88
Oct 1-5, 2025	(France) 2025 Trophée Métropole Nice Côte d'Azur	3	72.03	5	105.16	5	177.19
Dec 18-20, 2025	(France) 2026 French Championships	8	61.39	7	135.32	7	196.71
Jan 22-25, 2026	(Italy) 2026 Merano Ice Trophy	14	70.05	3	138.71	3	208.76
Mar 13–15, 2026	(Luxembourg) 2026 Coupe du Printemps	8	51.39	7	103.54	7	154.93

Results in the 2026–27 season
Date	Event	SP		FS		Total	
Date	Event	P	Score	P	Score	P	Score
Aug 27-29, 2026	(France) 2026 Master's de Patinage	7	51.38	4	124.14	5	175.52
Sep 17–20, 2026	(Italy) 2026 CS Lombardia Trophy	3	89.08	4	158.58	3	247.66
Oct 22–25, 2026	(Croatia) 2026 Golden Bear of Zagreb	3	64.12	3	113.25	3	177.37

=== Junior level ===
Results in the 2017–18 season
Date	Event	SP		FS		Total	
Date	Event	P	Score	P	Score	P	Score
Dec 14–16, 2017	(France) 2018 French Championships (Junior)	11	44.78	12	78.31	12	123.09

Results in the 2018–19 season
Date	Event	SP		FS		Total	
Date	Event	P	Score	P	Score	P	Score
Dec 13–15, 2018	(France) 2019 French Championships (Junior)	11	44.22	8	88.66	10	132.88

Results in the 2019–20 season
Date	Event	SP		FS		Total	
Date	Event	P	Score	P	Score	P	Score
Aug 21–24, 2019	2019 JGP France	20	37.32	16	79.74	18	117.06
Sep 26–28, 2019	(France) 2019 Master's de Patinage	5	45.35	8	78.04	6	123.39
Dec 19–21, 2019	(France) 2020 French Championships (Junior)	6	49.50	5	94.93	6	144.43

Results in the 2021–22 season
Date	Event	SP		FS		Total	
Date	Event	P	Score	P	Score	P	Score
Aug 25–28, 2021	2021 JGP France II	12	46.76	7	100.40	8	147.16
Sep 30 – Oct 2, 2021	(France) 2021 Master's de Patinage	4	48.02	–	–	–	WD
Oct 14–17, 2021	(Hungary) 2021 Budapest Trophy	4	49.89	1	100.36	3	150.25
Oct 20–24, 2021	(France) 2021 Trophée Métropole Nice Côte d'Azur	1	57.30	2	108.07	2	165.37
Dec 16–18, 2021	(France) 2022 French Championships (Junior)	3	60.45	1	119.76	1	180.21
Jan 13–14, 2022	(Italy) 2022 IceLab International Cup	4	54.12	3	104.10	3	158.22
Jan 18–23, 2022	(Germany) 2022 Bavarian Open	4	60.50	3	124.35	4	184.85
Apr 13–17, 2022	(Estonia) 2022 World Junior Championships	17	64.10	19	112.14	17	176.24
