= Palais des sports Jean-Bouin =

Sports venue in Nice, France

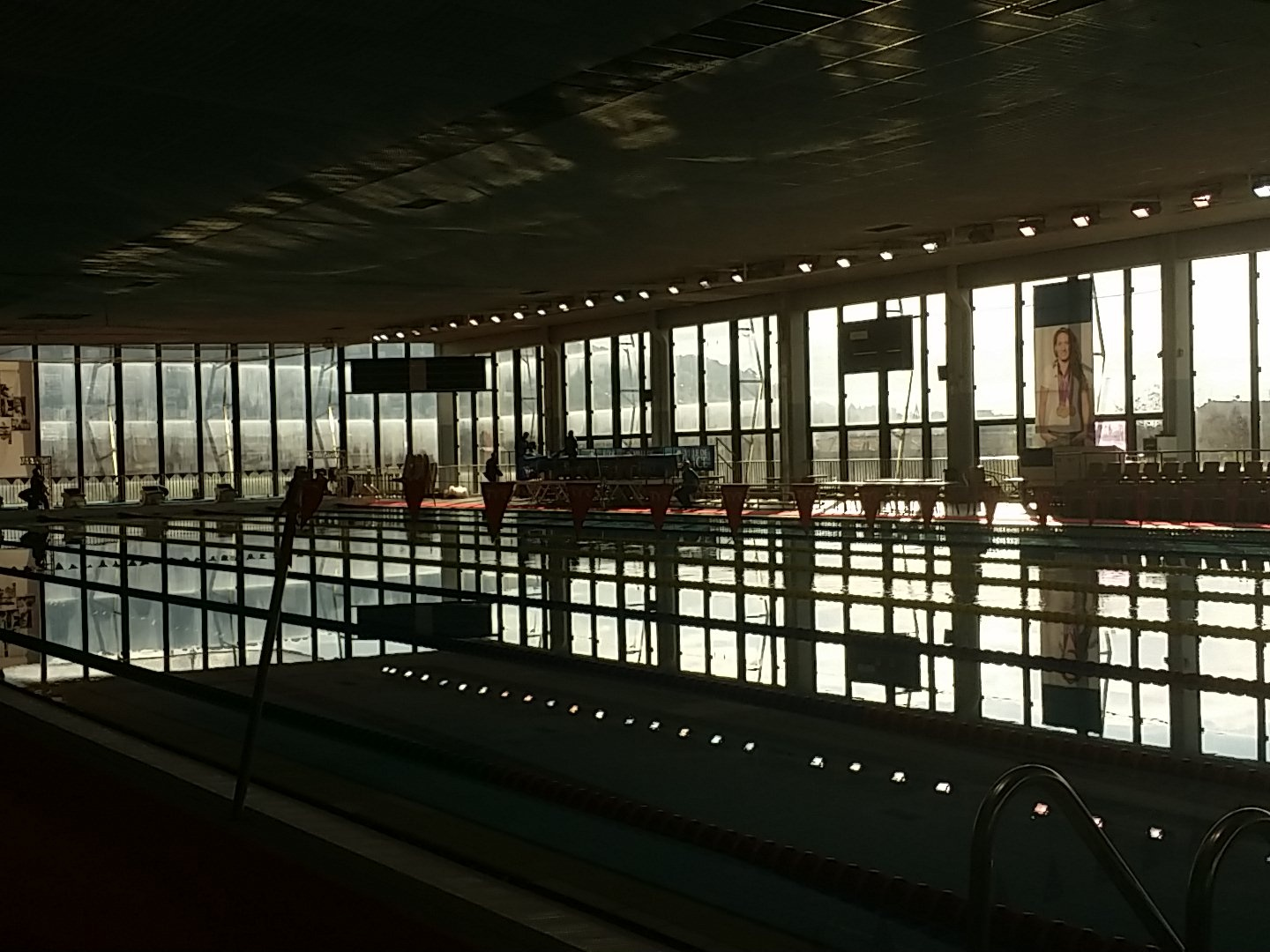
- Interactive map of Palais des sports Jean-Bouin
- Address: 2 rue Jean-Allègre; Nice
- Coordinates: 43.7080°N 7.2811°E
- Owner: City of Nice
- Operator: City of Nice
- Main venue: Ice rink
- Facilities: Swimming pool Fitness center Weightlifting gym Boxing gym Skate park
- Public transit: Palais des expositions
- Parking: Inside venue

Construction
- Built: 1981–1984
- Opened: 18 April 1984
- Architect: Georges-Xavier Marguerita

Palais des sports Jean-Bouin (English: Jean Bouin Sports Complex) is a multipurpose indoor complex located in downtown Nice, Alpes-Maritimes, France. It consists of a swimming pool, an ice rink, a fitness center and a car park, in addition to other ancillary venues. Opened in 1984, it inherited its name from an outdoor track and field stadium, which it replaced on the same site. It is the home venue for professional ice hockey team Aigles de Nice.

== Stade du XVème-Corps / Stade Jean-Bouin (1936–1980) ==
Stade Jean-Bouin
- Interactive map of Stade Jean-Bouin
- Former names: Stade du XVème-Corps
- Address: Place du XVème-Corps
- Owner: City of Nice
- Field size: 333 meters (track length)

Construction
- Opened: 20 September 1936
- Reopened: 17 March 1953
- Demolished: 1981

Tenant
- Nice Université Club

=== History ===
The first sports facility built on the premises was Stade du XVème-Corps (lit. 'XV Corps Stadium'), inaugurated on 20 September 1936 by mayor Jean Médecin. The venue took its name from the public square it was built on, Place du XVème-Corps, itself named after the XVème Corps, a southern unit of the French Land Army. Due to its designation as a military site, the building of the track was subject to three years of negotiations. Before this, there was no track and field venue within the city of Nice. The FFA-sanctioned meet held on inauguration day was billed as the first true event of its type held in Nice.

The project's first phase was financed with city funds only. Because of this and urbanistic concerns, it was pitched as a simple physical education venue, and did not have a stand. In 1941, the government allocated funds covering three quarters of the stand's construction costs, but various circumstances delayed the extension for more than a decade. After many delays, building started at the end of 1951 and proceeded thanks to FF5 million worth of credits voted by the city council. The new version reopened on 17 March 1953.

On 21 April 1950, Auguste Vérola, deputy mayor in charge of sports, asked the city council to rename the building Stade Jean-Bouin after Olympic track medalist and World War I casualty Jean Bouin, which was approved. In 1954, a patron named Mr. Sartorio donated a diorama tribute to Bouin, which was placed inside the stadium.

In 1970, Charles Ehrmann, deputy mayor in charge of sports, pitched a new track and field stadium called Stade de l'Ouest in the Western part of the city, which was inaugurated in 1973. This freed the parcel occupied by Stade Jean-Bouin for an extension of mayor Jacques Médecin's pet project, the Acropolis convention district. The building was approved for demolition in 1980.

=== Facilities ===
The stadium offered a six-lane, 333-metre oval with a 100-metre straight on the west side, which was a cinder track at launch. It was not treated as a first-rate facility, and faced its share of maintenance and homologation delays. Also featured were multiple pétanque grounds and a basketball court, later expanded to two. The original complex resembled a recreational park more than a spectator venue. In 1952–53, a row of pétanque grounds on the East side was phased out and replaced by a permanent stand. The stand was rebuilt and expanded in 1967.

The stadium served as the city's catch-all venue, mostly for grassroot events. Its chief tenant was the area's leading track club, Nice Université Club (today Nice Côte d'Azur Athlétisme), which was previously based at the smaller Stade Roland-Garros in the Cimiez neighborhood. The N.U.C. staged a number of interclub matches and meets there, including the very first. Many others have trained there on a temporary basis, like the track and gymnastics sections of O.G.C. Nice. The basketball courts have hosted many corporate and youth games, and occasionally served as an overflow venue for more established clubs, such as second-tier Société amicale de natation de Nice.

=== Notable events ===
The stadium hosted the Côte d'Azur qualifiers for the 1938 French Athletics Championships, some men's national championships during the 60th Federal Gymnastics Festival in 1947, and a stage of the Tour de France in 1973.

Tour de France stage finish
Year	Date	Stage	Starting place	Distance		Stage winner	Yellow jersey	Ref.
Year	Date	Stage	Starting place	km	mi	Stage winner	Yellow jersey	Ref.
1973	10 July	Stage 9	Embrun–Uvernet	234.5	146	Vicente López Carril (ESP)	Luis Ocaña (ESP)	

== Palais des sports Jean-Bouin (1984–present) ==
=== History ===
The land where Stade Jean-Bouin once sat was selected to house the Acropolis convention district's new multistorey car park. Deputy mayor Ehrmann pleaded with Jacques Médecin to preserve the site's athletic usage, and thus an indoor sports center was added to the top of the building. It was designed by local architect Georges-Xavier Marguerita, who was responsible for many real estate projects throughout the city at the time. The new complex was inaugurated on 18 April 1984.

The venue's management rights were originally handed to the CACEL (Centre d'animation, de culture et de loisirs, lit. 'Center for Entertainment, Culture and Leisure'), a YMCA-style organization created by Jacques Médecin. Amidst Médecin's judicial problems in 1993, a court revoked CACEL's jurisdiction over the venue, but the association handed it back in a state of disrepair, which bogged down its attractiveness for years. Private operator France Patinoire (later Carilis) successfully bid for the rights, but struggled to right the ship and fought the city over the costs of some refurbishments. In 2004, rival operator Gesclub was put in charge and struggled as well. As a result, in 2009, the city of Nice took direct control of the complex, which remains outdated despite some targeted renovations.

In 1987, bank robber Philippe Truc, who had just been airlifted from the courtyard of the Nice Detention Center, used the Palais des sports' terrace to climb aboard the escape helicopter piloted by his accomplice, convicted murderer Philippe Delaire. They were re-captured a few days later.

=== Facilities ===
Palais des sports Jean-Bouin has seven floors and one underground level. The street level houses several commercial spaces, including a Stellantis automobile dealership. The car park occupies four floors with room for 1,928 vehicles. A restaurant is located on the fifth floor, between the ice rink and swimming pool.

Patinoire Jean-Bouin
- Interactive map of Patinoire Jean-Bouin
- Capacity: 1,032 (seated); 1,200 (with standing room)
- Executive suites: None
- Field size: 60 × 30 metre

Tenants
- Aigles de Nice (Ligue Magnus) (1984–present)

==== Ice rink ====
Located on the building's fifth floor, it features an Olympic-sized ice pad, six locker rooms and a single stand, with a capacity listed at 1032 seats and 1200 patrons as of 2015–16. The rink was built largely for recreational purpose and is devoid of corporate amenities, which has stiffed its hockey tenant's revenues. In 2024, the team split its limited seating inventory into several classes in an attempt to optimize revenues. In 2030, the ice rink section of the Jean Bouin Complex will be shuttered, and its space will be taken over by an extension of the adjacent swimming pool. Meanwhile, Nice's ice sports clubs will move to a brand new, dual-ice arena built for the XXVI Winter Olympics, to which the city will play host.

Jean Bouin is the home ice for professional hockey team, the Aigles de Nice, who currently play at the highest level of the French pyramid, the Ligue Magnus. It hosts ancillary festivities during the Nice Carnival, as well as the Trophée Métropole Nice Côte d'Azur (formerly Nice International Cup), which is part of the ISU Challenger Series. It served as a training rink for two World Figure Skating Championships, which were held at the nearby Palais des Expositions Acropolis, and will fill a similar role during the 2030 Olympics.

Piscine Jean-Bouin
- Interactive map of Piscine Jean-Bouin
- Dimensions: Length: 50 metre (pool 1) 15 metre (pool 2); Width: 21 metre (pool 1) 8 metre (pool 2)

==== Swimming pool ====
A dual-pool facility with a seven-lane, Olympic-length main pool, which is the only indoor full-length course in the department. It is the home pool for Olympic Nice natation and, as such, has been the training venue for several world class swimmers among its membership, including Olympic gold medalists Yannick Agnel and Camille Muffat. In 2013, an outdoor pool was built just for competitors in the Western part of the city. Additionally, Jean Bouin hosts the city's water polo team, which is currently part of the Olympic, but experienced its biggest successes in the 1980s and 1990s under the CACEL umbrella.

==== Fitness center ====
A 1,600 m^{2} (17,000 sq ft) fitness center affiliated with the Les Mills training program, open to general audiences.

==== Weightlifting gym ====
A 300 m^{2} (3,200 sq ft) weightlifting room for competitive athletes.

==== Boxing gym ====
2003 saw the addition of a 360 m^{2} (3,900 sq ft) boxing and savate gym, Salle Georges-Carpentier, whose design is attributed to local architect Fabien Gouré. It is the training base for Algerian Olympic gold medalist Imane Khelif.

==== Skate park ====
The southern terrace has housed a skate park since 1999. Spanning 2,200 m^{2} (24,000 sq ft), it features various ramps and an asphalt rink, which has been used for inline and, more recently, rink hockey.
