= Misha Fabian =

Filipino figure skater, model, actress (born 1998)

Personal information
- Born: August 10, 1998 (age 27)

Figure skating career
- Country: Philippines
- Discipline: Women's singles
- Skating club: FilChi Ice Skating Club
- Began skating: 2008
- Competitive: 2011–present

Mikayla Shalom "Misha" Fabian (born August 10, 1998) is a Filipino figure skater and theatre actress.

She competed in the 2019 and 2023 Winter World University Games. She is the first-ever competitor of the Philippines for that international tournament.

== Early life and education ==
Fabian was born on August 10, 1998. She first gained interest in theatre when her parent took her to the musical Beauty and the Beast on Broadway in New York City. Her father was also a fan of musical theater songs.

Fabian first ice skated at age six, as part of a friend's birthday celebration. Her entry to figure skating was hampered by a primary complex diagnosis. It was only at ten years old when she started skating recreationally.

She attended the GCF International Christian School; and later the Ateneo de Manila University where she pursued a degree in European studies. She was part of the Ateneo Blue Repertory in her junior and senior years.

== Career ==
Fabian started competing for the Philippines internationally in 2011. At the 2015 Asian Junior Figure Skating Championship in Hong Kong she finished third in the Basic Junior Ladies division.

She became the first-ever competitor for the Philippines in the Winter World University Games when she competed in the 2019 edition in Krasnoyarsk, Russia, when the tournament was still known as the Winter Universiade. She also competed at the 2023 edition in Lake Placid.

She was also a member of the FilChi Ice Skating Club, an affiliated organization of the Philippine Skating Union.

== Entertainment career ==
Fabian has appeared in short films and has modelled for advertisements. She was considered for a role in the 2023 GMA Network television series Hearts on Ice which features figure skating. She had to decline due to scheduling conflicts with her competition preparation.

Fabian is also a theatre actress. She appeared as Ally in 9 Works Theatrical's 2024 interpretation of Jonathan Larson's rock musical Rent.

== Detailed results ==
2018–19 season
Date	Event	Level	SP	FS	Total
March 6–9, 2019	Winter Universiade	Senior	34; 17.55	DNQ	34; 17.55
2022–23 season
Date	Event	Level	SP	FS	Total
January 13–15, 2023	Winter World University Games	Senior	34; 15.80	DNQ	34; 15.80
