= Philippine Open Short Track Championships =

Tournament information
- Sport: Short track speed skating
- Location: Philippines
- Established: 2018
- Number of tournaments: 1

The Philippine Open Short Track Championships is the national short track speed skating competition in the Philippines. It is organized by the Philippine Skating Union.

The first edition will be held on September 27, 2018, at the SM Megamall Ice Skating Rink in Mandaluyong. The performance of the more than 35 athletes which will compete in the inaugural edition of the championships will be used as basis for the selection of the Philippines' representatives in the 2019 Southeast Asian Games in short track speed skating. 500-meter, 1000-meter, 1,500-meter and relay will be contested for both male and female competitors. India also fielded speed skaters in this edition. Kevin Villanueva dominated the Men Senior Category by winning three gold medals while Kathryn Magno did the same for the Ladies Senior Category also by winning three gold medals.

The second edition was planned to be held in 2019 but was cancelled due to the organization of the 2019 SEA Games. The COVID-19 pandemic led to the cancellation of plans to hold the tournament in 2020 and 2021.

== Results ==
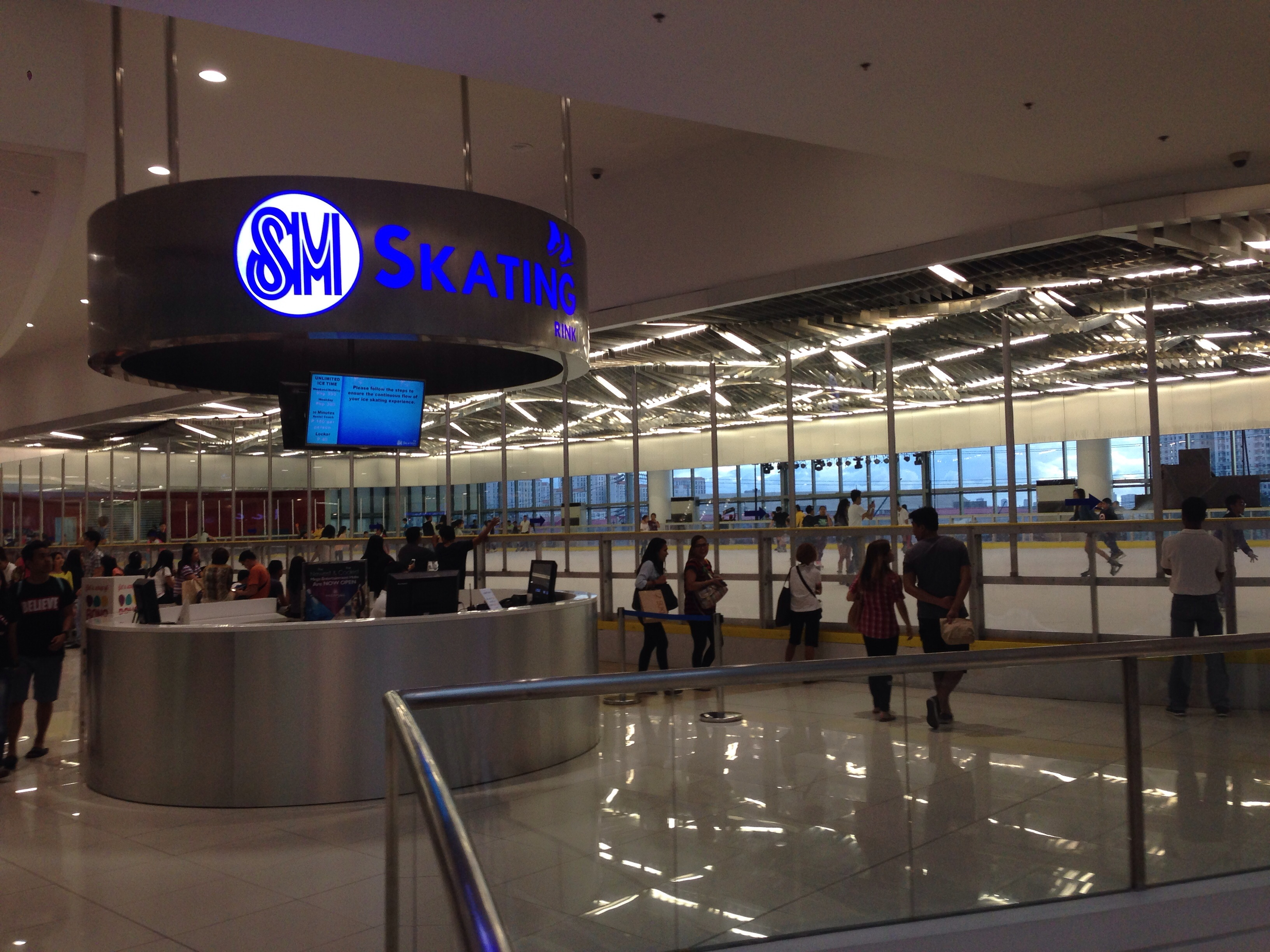
Ice Skating Rink at SM Megamll

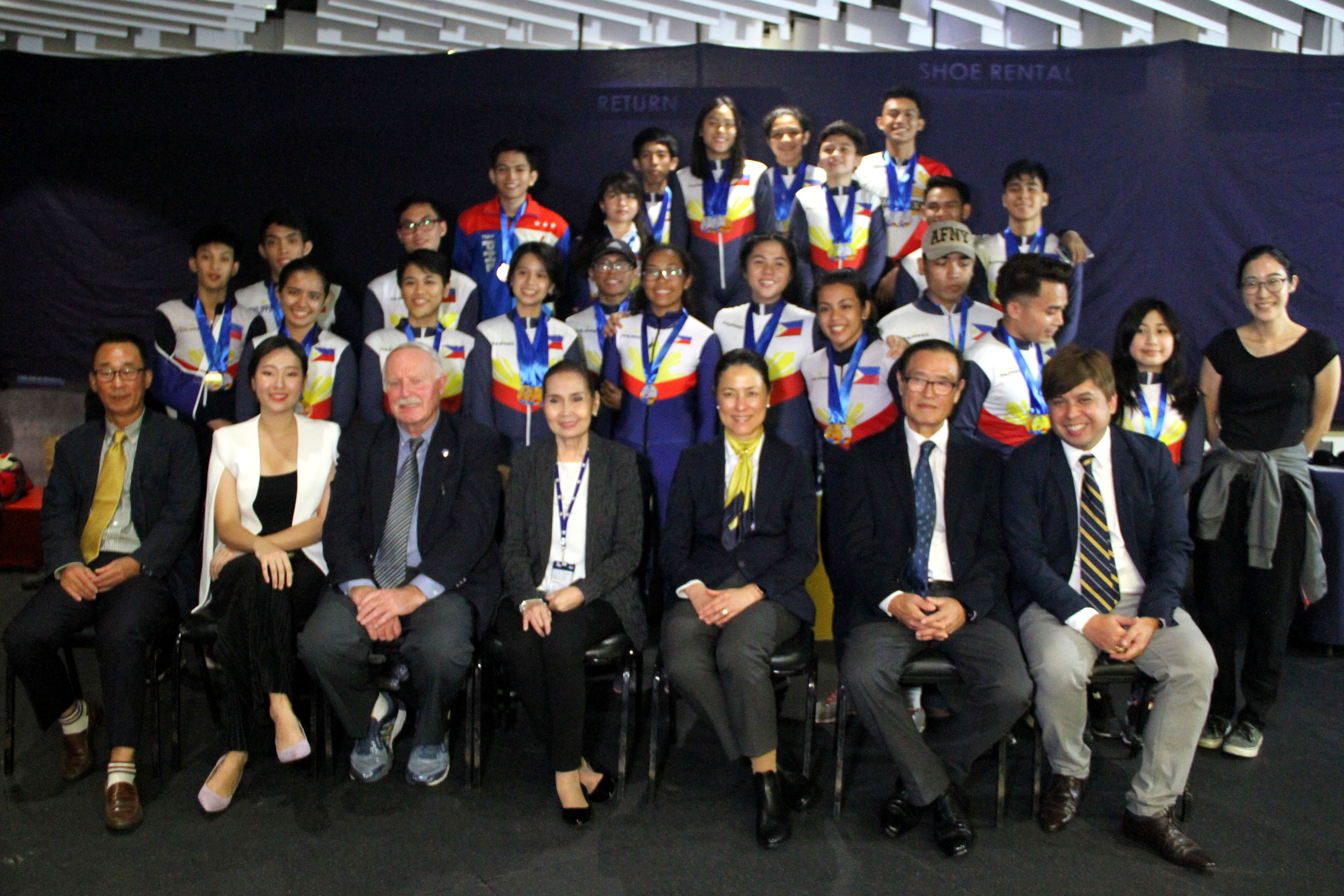
Medalists of the 2018 Philippine Open Championships with officials of the Philippine Skating Union.

Event		Gold	Silver	Bronze	Ref.
Men's	500m	Kevin Villanueva	Edward Calalo	Jr. Ravales	
Men's	1000m	Kevin Villanueva	Nile Cadiz	Edward Calalo	
Men's	1500m	Kevin Villanueva	Nile Cadiz	Jayr Felipe	
Women's	500m	Kathryn Magno	Molly Martinez	Bea Zablan	
Women's	1000m	Kathryn Magno	Bea Zablan	Molly Martinez	
Women's	1500m	Kathryn Magno	Anna Cruz	Bea Zablan	
