= Nella Pelkonen =

Finnish figure skater (born 2005)

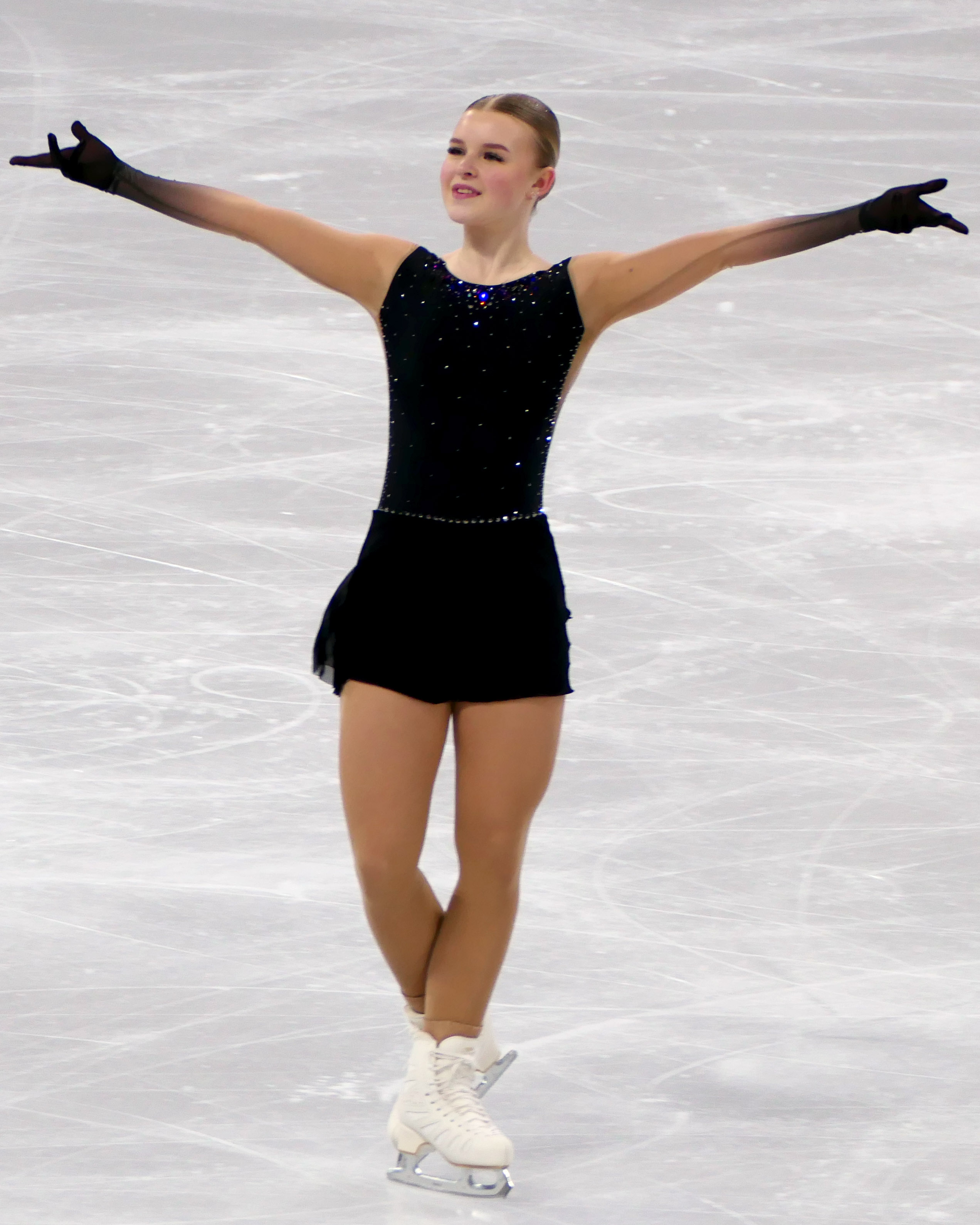
- Nella Pelkonen at the 2024 World Championships

Personal information
- Full name: Nella Julia Pelkonen
- Born: 13 April 2005 (age 21) Tampere, Finland
- Height: 1.59 m (5 ft 2 1/2 in)

Figure skating career
- Country: Finland
- Discipline: Women's singles
- Coach: Susanna Haarala
- Skating club: Tappara Figure Skating Club
- Began skating: 2010
- Retired: August 19, 2026

Medal record
Finnish Championships
Gold medal – first place	2024 Helsinki	Singles
Silver medal – second place	2023 Joensuu	Singles

Nella Julia Pelkonen (born 13 April 2005 in Tampere) is a retired Finnish figure skater. She is the 2023 Nordic champion and 2023–24 Finnish national champion.

== Personal life ==
Pelkonen was born on 13 April, 2005, in Tampere, Finland. In addition to figure skating, she also enjoys baking.

== Competitive career ==
=== Early career ===
Pelkonen started training figure skating in 2010 at the age of five when she entered the Koovee figure skating school in Tampere. The head coach of the Koovee FSC, Minna Järvinen, was impressed by Pelkonen's attitude and enthusiasm right from the beginning, and Pelkonen was quickly moved to higher level groups. From there, Pelkonen was coached by Järvinen and Christina Wendelin.

Pelkonen debuted as an advanced novice skater at the 2019 Coupe du Printemps, where she won the bronze medal.

=== 2019–20 season ===
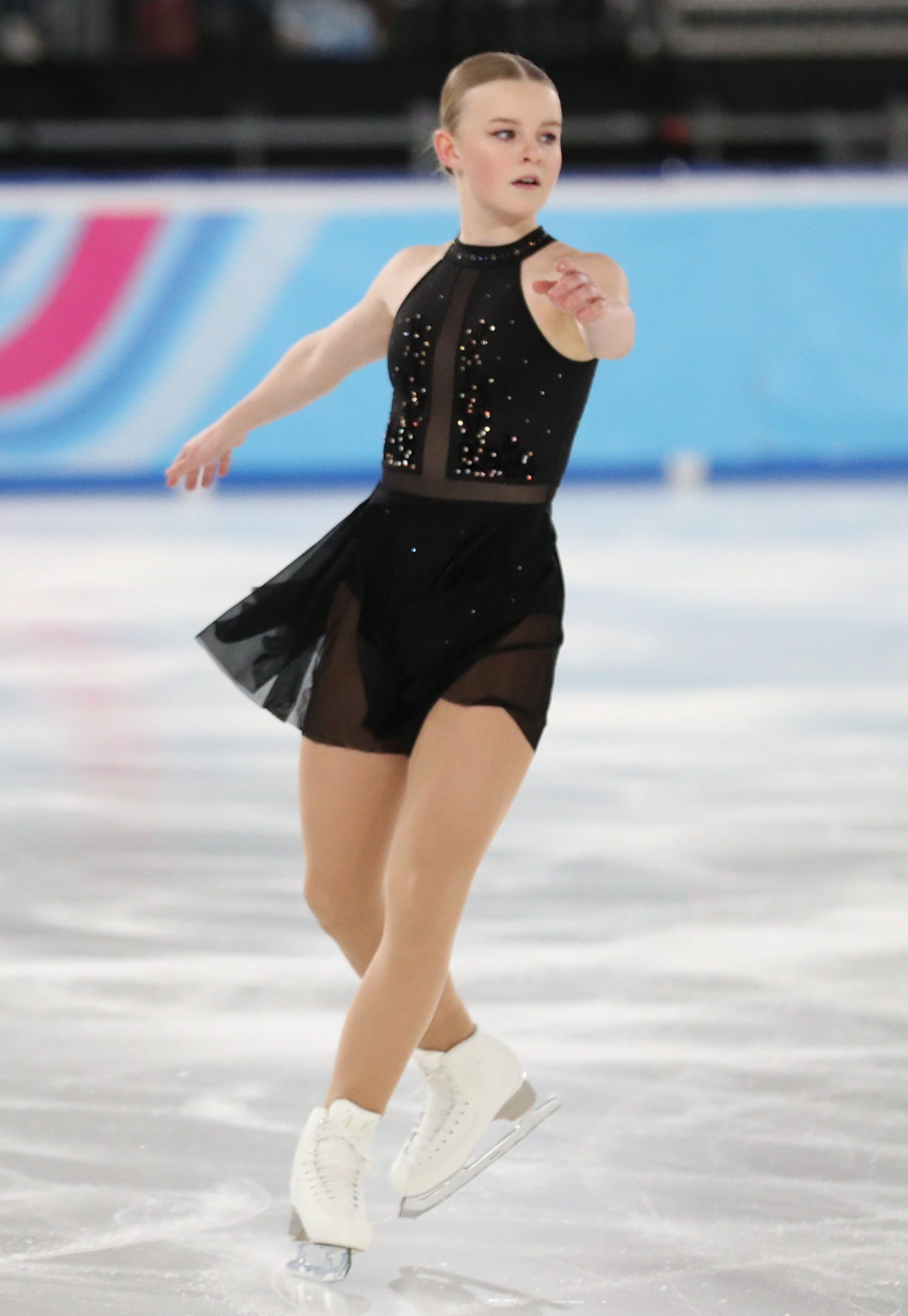
Pelkonen at the 2020 Winter Youth Olympics

Prior to the season, Pelkonen was chosen to Finnish Figure Skating Association's junior national team.

She would start the season with a fourth-place finish on the junior level at the 2019 Open d'Andorra. Pelkonen subsequently went on to win the 2019–20 Finnish Junior Championships. Because of this result, she was selected to represent Finland at the 2020 Winter Youth Olympics in Lausanne, Switzerland.

At the Youth Olympics, Pelkonen finished sixteenth in the ladies' singles event and fourth in the mixed team competition as a part of the Team Determination.

She would then close the season with an eighteenth-place finish at the 2020 Nordic Junior Championships.

Following the season, Pelkonen was made a member of the senior national team. Although, she did not compete for the duration of the 2020–21 figure skating season.

=== 2021–22 season ===
Returning to competition, Pelkonen competed on the junior level of the 2021 Santa Claus Cup, finishing fourteenth. She did not compete for the remainder of the season.

=== 2022–23 season ===
Pelkonen began the season by competing on the 2022–23 ISU Junior Grand Prix circuit, finishing seventh at the 2022 JGP France and eleventh at the 2022 JGP Latvia.

Making her senior international debut at the 2022 CS Finlandia Trophy, Pelkonen placed fourteenth. She subsequently competed at the 2022 Cup of Nice but withdrew after performing her short program.

Going on to compete at the 2022–23 Finnish Championships, Pelkonen won the silver medal behind Janna Jyrkinen. Selected to represent Finland at the 2023 Winter World University Games, Pelkonen finished ninth.

She would end the season by winning gold at the 2023 Nordic Championships.

=== 2023–24 season ===
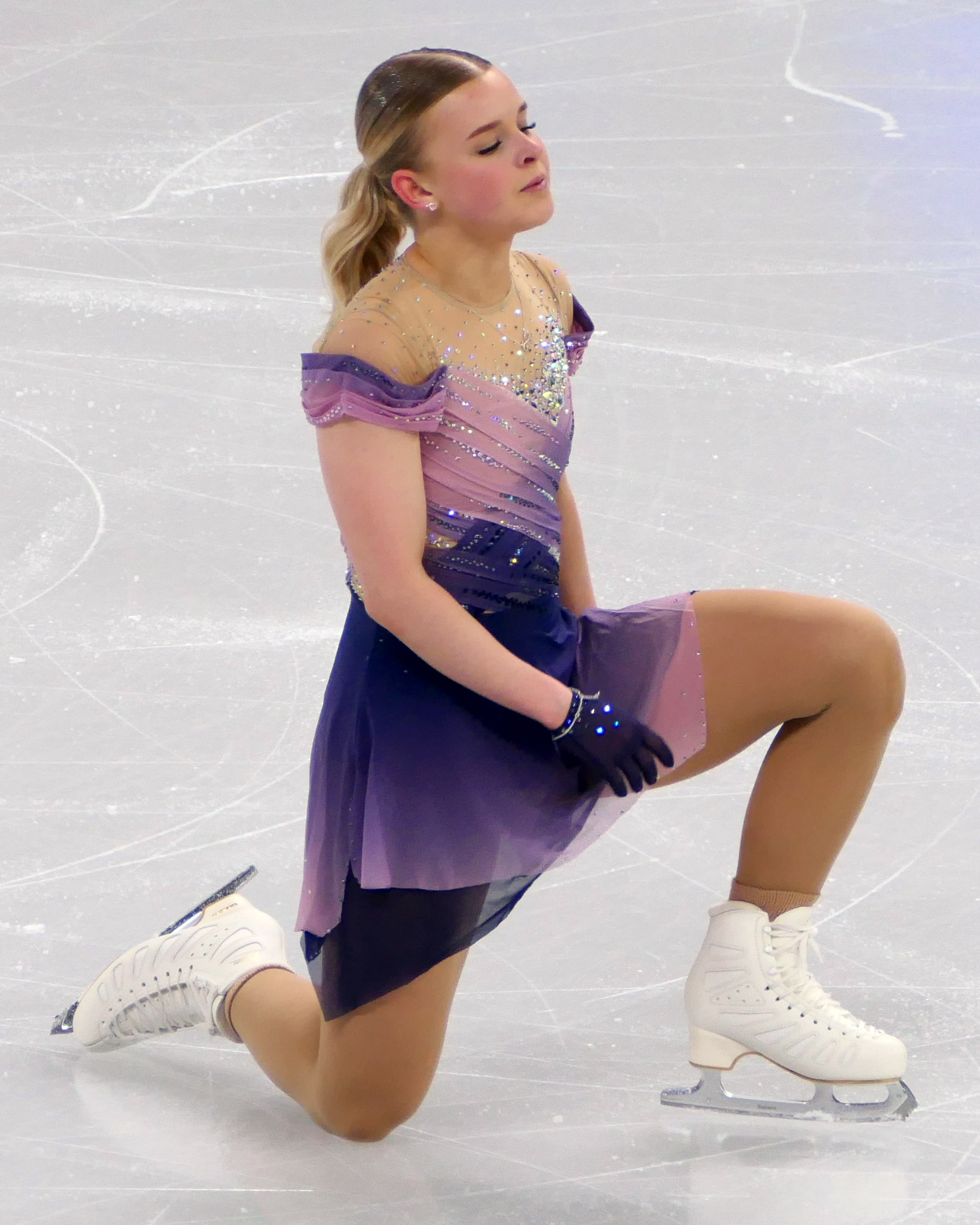
Pelkonen during her free skate at the 2024 World Championships

In the summer of 2023 Pelkonen decided to leave Koovee FSC and transfer to Tappara FSC, where Susanna Haarala became her new coach.

Pelkonen started the season by competing at the 2023 CS Finlandia Trophy, where she placed seventh in the short program but won the free skate, moving up to fourth place overall. Selected as a host pick to compete at the 2023 Grand Prix of Espoo, Pelkonen finished sixth of the twelve competitors at the event.

Competing at the 2023–24 Finnish Championships in December, Pelkonen won the national title and was selected to compete at the European and World Championships.

At the 2024 European Championships in Kaunas, Lithuania, Pelkonen finished twenty-first.

Shortly before the 2024 World Championships, Pelkonen began feeling pain in both her feet. In spite of this, Pelkonen pushed herself to compete anyways, finishing twenty-fourth. Following the World Championships, Pelkonen would spend four weeks off the ice to recover.

=== 2024–25 season ===
Although originally assigned to only compete at the 2024 Finlandia Trophy on the 2024–25 Grand Prix series, Pelkonen was later selected to compete at the 2024 Skate Canada International to replace Ava Marie Ziegler, who withdrew from the event due to injury. However, Pelkonen also withdrew from the latter event two weeks before it was set to take place due to illness and stress fracture precursors in both her legs. At the 2024 Finlandia Trophy in late November, Pelkonen finished the event in eleventh place. She said that while it had been a good performance given the circumstances, she was also disappointed: "I'm not yet at the level I want to be or was last season. It's been hard to accept."

Pelkonen would ultimately withdraw from the 2025 Finnish Championships.

=== 2025–26 season ===
Pelkonen made her return to competition at the 2026 Finnish Championships, where she finished in seventh place.

Pelkonen announced her retirement on 19 August, 2026. During the off-season, she discussed her future with a mental coach to come to her decision. She noted that she had not always allowed her body enough time to recover after her injuries, and that it was especially difficult for her to decide whether to stop competing ahead of the 2027 World Championships, which would be held in her hometown of Tampere.

== Programs ==
Season	Short program	Free skating	Exhibition
2025–2026	Fallin' by Alicia Keys performed by Meghan Crystal choreo. by Elina Ikonen	Fiordland; Adélie by kïngpinguïn, Avery Bright, & Matthew S. Nelson choreo. by Elina Ikonen	
2024–2025	Be Italian (from Nine) by Maury Yeston & Fergie choreo. by Elina Ikonen	Tourner Dans Le Vide by Indila choreo. by Elina Ikonen	
2023–2024	Los Vas A Olvidar by Billie Eilish & Rosalía choreo. by Elina Ikonen	Tourner Dans Le Vide by Indila choreo. by Elina Ikonen	Kohti valoo by Ilta
2022–2023	Los Vas A Olvidar by Billie Eilish & Rosalía choreo. by Elina Ikonen	Tourner Dans Le Vide by Indila choreo. by Elina Ikonen; The Dressmaker by David Hirschfelder choreo. by Elina Ikonen	
2021–2022	Audition (The Fools Who Dream) (from La La Land) by Justin Hurwitz performed by Emma Stone choreo. by Elina Ikonen	The Dressmaker by David Hirschfelder choreo. by Elina Ikonen	
2019–2020	The Dressmaker by David Hirschfelder choreo. by Elina Ikonen	Paramour (from Cirque du Soleil) by Guy Dubuc & Marc Lessard choreo. by Elina Ikonen	

== Competitive highlights ==
- GP – Event of the ISU Grand Prix Series
- JGP – Event of the ISU Grand Prix Series
- CS – Event of the ISU Challenger Series
- TBD – Assigned
- WD – Withdrew from event

Competition placements at senior level
Season	2022–23	2023–24	2024–25	2025–26
World Championships		24th		
European Championships		21st		
Finnish Championships	2nd	1st		7th
GP Finland		6th	11th	
CS Finlandia Trophy	14th	4th		
Bavarian Open			2nd	
Nordic Championships	1st		6th	
Trophée Métropole Nice	WD			
Winter University Games	9th			

Competition placements at junior level
Season	2019–20	2021–22	2022-23
Winter Youth Olympics	16th		
Finnish Championships	1st		
JGP France			7th
JGP Latvia			11th
Nordic Championships	18th		
Open d'Andorra	4th		
Santa Claus Cup		14th	

== Detailed results ==
ISU personal best scores in the +5/-5 GOE System
Segment	Type	Score	Event
Total	TSS	179.31	2023 CS Finlandia Trophy
Short program	TSS	62.60	2024 European Championships
Short program	TES	34.02	2024 European Championships
Short program	PCS	28.58	2024 European Championships
Free skating	TSS	120.58	2023 CS Finlandia Trophy
Free skating	TES	62.00	2023 CS Finlandia Trophy
Free skating	PCS	58.53	2023 CS Finlandia Trophy

=== Senior level ===
Results in the 2022–23 season
Date	Event	SP		FS		Total	
Date	Event	P	Score	P	Score	P	Score
Oct 5–9, 2022	(Finland) 2022 CS Finlandia Trophy	10	55.44	16	87.00	14	142.44
Oct 18–23, 2022	(France) 2022 Trophée Métropole Nice Côte d'Azur	7	48.26	–	–	–	WD
Dec 16–18, 2022	(Finland) 2023 Finnish Championships	3	53.35	2	104.22	2	157.57
Jan 12–16, 2023	(United States) 2023 Winter World University Games	14	52.37	8	100.21	9	152.58
Feb 1–5, 2023	(Iceland) 2023 Nordic Championships	3	57.57	1	119.24	1	176.81

Results in the 2023–24 season
Date	Event	SP		FS		Total	
Date	Event	P	Score	P	Score	P	Score
Oct 4–8, 2023	(Finland) 2023 CS Finlandia Trophy	7	58.78	1	120.53	4	179.31
Nov 17–19, 2023	(Finland) 2023 Grand Prix of Espoo	8	58.12	5	114.76	6	172.88
Dec 15–17, 2023	(Finland) 2024 Finnish Championships	2	59.44	1	120.29	1	179.73
Jan 8–14, 2024	(Lithuania) 2024 European Championships	7	62.60	23	87.41	21	150.01
Mar 18–24, 2024	(Canada) 2024 World Championships	21	56.82	24	88.63	24	145.45

Results in the 2024–25 season
Date	Event	SP		FS		Total	
Date	Event	P	Score	P	Score	P	Score
Nov 15–17, 2024	(Finland) 2024 Finlandia Trophy	12	52.14	10	103.08	11	155.22
Jan 20–26, 2025	(Germany) 2025 Bavarian Open	4	52.12	2	113.94	2	166.06
Feb 6–9, 2025	(Norway) 2025 Nordic Championships	5	51.50	7	91.39	6	142.89

Results in the 2025–26 season
Date	Event	SP		FS		Total	
Date	Event	P	Score	P	Score	P	Score
Dec 12–14, 2025	(Finland) 2026 Finnish Championships	8	46.04	5	88.64	7	134.68
