= Figure skating at the 2023 Winter World University Games =

Figure skating competition

Figure skating at the Lake Placid 2023 FISU World University Games
- Figure skating pictogram
- Venue: Herb Brooks Arena
- Dates: January 13–15, 2023

Figure skating at the 2023 Winter World University Games was held on January 13–15 at the Herb Brooks Arena in Lake Placid, New York, United States. Medals were awarded in men's singles, women's singles and ice dance.

== Regulations ==
Skaters who were born between 1 January 1997 and 31 December 2005 are eligible to compete at the Winter Universiade if they are registered as proceeding towards a degree or diploma at a university or similar institute, or obtained their academic degree or diploma in the year preceding the event.

In ice dance, only one partner must be a citizen of the country for which they are competing. Each nation may send a maximum of three entries per discipline.

== Medal summary ==
=== Medal table ===
Rank	Nation	Gold	Silver	Bronze	Total
1	Japan	2	2	0	4
2	France	1	0	1	2
3	United States*	0	1	0	1
4	Italy	0	0	1	1
4	South Korea	0	0	1	1
Totals (5 entries)		3	3	3	9

=== Medalists ===
Event	Gold	Silver	Bronze
Men's singles	Sōta Yamamoto; Japan	Tatsuya Tsuboi; Japan	Nikolaj Memola; Italy
Women's singles	Mai Mihara; Japan	Kaori Sakamoto; Japan	Kim Ye-lim; South Korea
Ice dance	Marie Dupayage; Thomas Nabais; France	Lorraine McNamara; Anton Spiridonov; United States	Natacha Lagouge; Arnaud Caffa; France

== Schedule ==
Listed in local time (UTC-05:00).

Date	Start	Discipline	Event
January 13	13:00	Ice dance	Rhythm dance
January 13	17:00	Men	Short program
January 14	13:00	Women	Short program
January 14	20:00	Ice Dance	Free dance
January 15	13:00	Men	Free skating
January 15	19:00	Women	Free skating
January 16	14:00		Exhibition gala

== Entries ==
Country	Men	Women	Ice dance
Armenia		Marina Asoyan	Viktoriia Azroian / Artur Gruzdev
Australia		Romy Grogan	
Austria	Luc Maierhofer	Emily Saari	
Bulgaria	Larry Loupolover	Alexandra Feigin	
Czech Republic	Petr Kotlařík	Nikola Rychtaříková	
Estonia		Eva-Lotta Kiibus	
Finland	Makar Suntsev	Nella Pelkonen	
France	Samy Hammi; Landry Le May	Maïa Mazzara	Marie Dupayage / Thomas Nabais; Natacha Lagouge / Arnaud Caffa
Great Britain	Henry Privett-Mendoza; Elliot Thompson	Christie Shannon	
Germany	Kai Jagoda		Charise Matthaei / Max Liebers
Hong Kong	Chiu Hei Cheung; Heung Lai Zhao	Joanna So	
Hungary	Mózes József Berei		Lucy Hancock / Ilias Fourati
Italy	Nikolaj Memola	Marina Piredda	Leia Dozzi / Pietro Papetti
Japan	Shun Sato; Tatsuya Tsuboi; Sōta Yamamoto	Mai Mihara; Kaori Sakamoto; Rion Sumiyoshi	
Kazakhstan	Dias Jirenbayev; Mikhail Shaidorov	Russalina Shakrova; Yasmin Tekik	Gaukhar Nauryzova / Boyisangur Datiev
Latvia		Angelīna Kučvaļska	
Lithuania		Aleksandra Golovkina	Paulina Ramanauskaitė / Deividas Kizala
Mexico		Eugenia Garza	
Norway		Frida Turiddótter Berge	
Philippines		Mikayla Shalom Fabian	
Poland		Ekaterina Kurakova	
Slovakia		Ema Doboszová	Maria Sofia Pucherová / Nikita Lysak
South Korea	Cha Young-hyun; Lee Si-hyeong	Choi Da-bin; Kim Ye-lim	
Spain	Euken Alberdi; Tomàs-Llorenç Guarino Sabaté; Iker Oyarzábal Albas	Lucía Ruiz-Manzano	
Sweden	Gabriel Folkesson	Julia Brovall	
Switzerland	Nurullah Sahaka; Micha Steffen	Shaline Rüegger	
Thailand		Teekhree Silpa-Archa	
Turkey	Alp Eren Özkan	Fatma Yade Karlıklı	
Ukraine	Ivan Shmuratko	Anastasia Gozhva	Mariia Holubtsova / Kyryl Bielobrov
United States	Nathan Chapple; Goku Endo; Dinh Tran	Ting Cui; Finley Hawk; Wren Warne-Jacobsen	Raffaella Koncius / Alexey Shchepetov; Angela Ling / Caleb Wein; Lorraine McNamara / Anton Spiridonov
Uzbekistan	Azizmurod Shabazov	Niginabonu Jamoliddinova	

=== Changes to preliminary entries ===
Date	Discipline	Withdrew	Added	Reason/Other notes	Refs
December 28	Men	(Japan) Yuma Kagiyama	(Japan) Sōta Yamamoto	Ankle injury	
January 7	Women	(Italy) Lara Naki Gutmann	(Italy) Marina Piredda		
January 12	Men	(Australia) Callum Bradshaw	N/A		

== Results ==
=== Men ===
Rank	Name	Nation	Total points	SP		FS	
1st place, gold medalist(s)	Sōta Yamamoto	Japan	274.86	1	101.32	1	173.54
2nd place, silver medalist(s)	Tatsuya Tsuboi	Japan	243.82	2	84.48	2	159.34
3rd place, bronze medalist(s)	Nikolaj Memola	Italy	231.33	4	78.96	4	152.37
4	Mikhail Shaidorov	Kazakhstan	231.08	6	75.05	3	156.03
5	Shun Sato	Japan	230.73	3	84.43	5	146.30
6	Lee Si-hyeong	South Korea	218.75	5	75.17	6	143.58
7	Cha Young-hyun	South Korea	208.03	10	67.13	7	140.90
8	Samy Hammi	France	202.00	9	69.17	10	132.83
9	Dinh Tran	United States	198.59	17	60.69	8	137.90
10	Landry Le May	France	196.69	8	70.62	12	126.07
11	Dias Jirenbayev	Kazakhstan	196.41	16	60.89	9	135.52
12	Goku Endo	United States	194.08	11	66.07	11	128.01
13	Kai Jagoda	Germany	192.68	7	70.64	14	122.04
14	Tomàs-Llorenç Guarino Sabaté	Spain	184.67	20	59.64	13	125.03
15	Micha Steffen	Switzerland	174.77	12	63.48	16	111.29
16	Gabriel Folkesson	Sweden	174.11	13	61.99	15	112.12
17	Nurullah Sahaka	Switzerland	173.15	14	61.97	17	111.18
18	Alp Eren Özkan	Turkey	170.93	15	61.91	19	109.02
19	Larry Loupolover	Bulgaria	169.93	18	59.81	18	110.12
20	Luc Maierhofer	Austria	162.49	19	59.64	20	102.85
21	Petr Kotlařík	Czech Republic	158.96	22	57.52	21	101.44
22	Henry Privett-Mendoza	Great Britain	154.23	23	57.29	22	96.94
23	Nathan Chapple	United States	153.04	24	57.19	23	95.85
24	Mózes József Berei	Hungary	142.66	21	58.90	24	83.76
Did not advance to free skating
25	Iker Oyarzábal Albas	Spain	56.73	25	56.73	—N/a	
26	Makar Suntsev	Finland	56.70	26	56.70	—N/a	
27	Euken Alberdi	Spain	54.67	27	54.67	—N/a	
28	Heung Lai Zhao	Hong Kong	50.70	28	50.70	—N/a	
29	Chiu Hei Cheung	Hong Kong	43.29	29	43.29	—N/a	
30	Elliott Thompson	Great Britain	43.24	30	43.24	—N/a	
31	Azizmurod Shabazov	Uzbekistan	36.31	31	36.31	—N/a	
WD	Ivan Shmuratko	Ukraine	withdrew from competition				

=== Women ===
Rank	Name	Nation	Total points	SP		FS	
1st place, gold medalist(s)	Mai Mihara	Japan	221.18	2	75.60	1	145.58
2nd place, silver medalist(s)	Kaori Sakamoto	Japan	217.42	1	78.40	2	139.02
3rd place, bronze medalist(s)	Kim Ye-lim	South Korea	200.16	3	73.73	3	126.43
4	Rion Sumiyoshi	Japan	191.48	4	72.58	5	118.90
5	Ekaterina Kurakova	Poland	186.73	5	63.22	4	123.51
6	Choi Da-bin	South Korea	171.53	6	59.13	6	112.40
7	Marina Piredda	Italy	161.45	15	52.09	7	109.36
8	Anastasia Gozhva	Ukraine	153.49	9	57.50	9	95.99
9	Nella Pelkonen	Finland	152.58	14	52.37	8	100.21
10	Angelīna Kučvaļska	Latvia	151.67	7	59.05	11	92.62
11	Joanna So	Hong Kong	149.85	12	54.41	10	95.44
12	Alexandra Feigin	Bulgaria	147.28	8	58.34	15	88.94
13	Shaline Rüegger	Switzerland	144.27	17	51.73	12	92.54
14	Ema Doboszová	Slovakia	144.12	16	52.08	13	92.04
15	Wren Warne-Jacobsen	United States	143.75	13	52.53	14	91.22
16	Eva-Lotta Kiibus	Estonia	139.66	11	55.12	16	84.54
17	Emily Saari	Austria	134.19	10	55.82	20	78.37
18	Maïa Mazzara	France	133.22	18	48.93	17	84.29
19	Nikola Rychtaříková	Czech Republic	125.53	20	46.34	19	79.19
20	Frida Turiddótter Berge	Norway	120.73	21	40.99	18	79.74
21	Eugenia Garza	Mexico	117.87	22	40.67	21	77.20
22	Fatma Yade Karlıklı	Turkey	115.31	23	40.99	22	75.85
23	Finley Hawk	United States	111.53	24	39.39	23	72.14
WD	Ting Cui	United States	withdrew	19	47.33	withdrew from competition	
Did not advance to free skating
25	Niginabonu Jamoliddinova	Uzbekistan	39.37	25	39.37	—N/a	
26	Julia Brovall	Sweden	38.51	26	38.51	—N/a	
27	Lucía Ruiz-Manzano	Spain	34.47	27	34.47	—N/a	
28	Yasmin Tekik	Kazakhstan	34.36	28	34.36	—N/a	
29	Christie Shannon	Great Britain	30.84	29	30.84	—N/a	
30	Romy Grogan	Australia	27.70	30	27.70	—N/a	
31	Russalina Shakrova	Kazakhstan	23.43	31	23.43	—N/a	
32	Teekhree Silpa-Archa	Thailand	20.24	32	20.24	—N/a	
33	Marina Asoyan	Armenia	20.02	33	20.02	—N/a	
34	Mikayla Shalom Fabian	Philippines	15.80	34	15.80	—N/a	
WD	Aleksandra Golovkina	Lithuania	withdrew from competition				

=== Ice dance ===
Rank	Name	Nation	Total points	RD		FD	
1st place, gold medalist(s)	Marie Dupayage / Thomas Nabais	France	176.04	2	68.72	1	107.32
2nd place, silver medalist(s)	Lorraine McNamara / Anton Spiridonov	United States	175.33	1	69.12	2	106.21
3rd place, bronze medalist(s)	Natacha Lagouge / Arnaud Caffa	France	167.35	3	68.21	4	99.14
4	Leia Dozzi / Pietro Papetti	Italy	163.56	6	61.91	3	101.65
5	Mariia Holubtsova / Kyryl Bielobrov	Ukraine	158.85	5	62.88	5	95.97
6	Angela Ling / Caleb Wein	United States	158.52	4	67.74	7	90.78
7	Raffaella Koncius / Alexey Shchepetov	United States	154.03	7	59.80	6	94.23
8	Charise Matthaei / Max Liebers	Germany	138.51	12	52.12	8	86.39
9	Gaukhar Nauryzova / Boyisangur Datiev	Kazakhstan	137.50	10	53.08	9	84.42
10	Maria Sofia Pucherová / Nikita Lysak	Slovakia	136.45	8	56.05	10	80.40
11	Paulina Ramanauskaitė / Deividas Kizala	Lithuania	132.40	9	55.29	12	77.11
12	Lucy Hancock / Ilias Fourati	Hungary	131.11	11	52.17	11	78.94
13	Viktoriia Azroian / Artur Gruzdev	Armenia	116.72	13	50.66	13	66.06
