= Mai Mihara =

Japanese retired figure skater

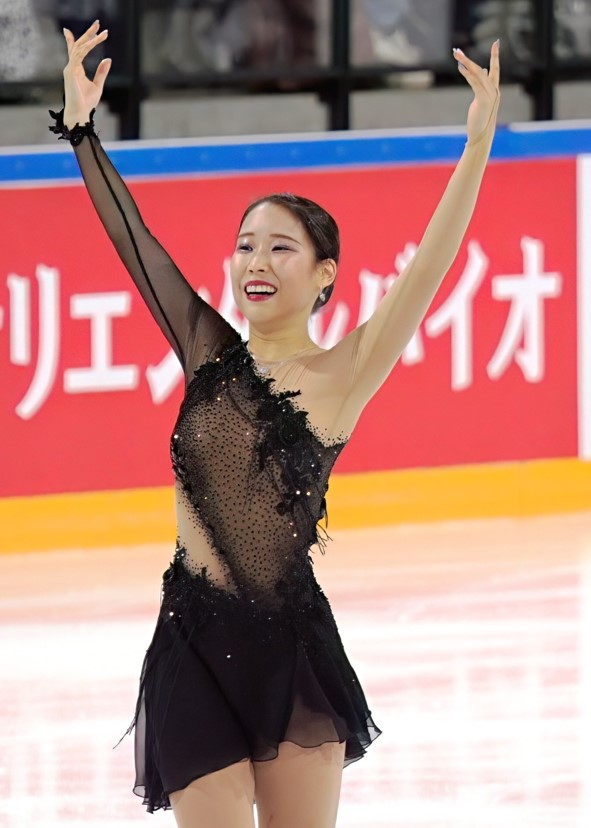
- Mihara at the 2024 Grand Prix de France

Personal information
- Native name: 三原 舞依
- Other names: Cinderella on Ice
- Born: 22 August 1999 (age 27) Kobe, Japan
- Height: 1.57 m (5 ft 2 in)

Figure skating career
- Country: Japan
- Discipline: Women's singles
- Coach: Sonoko Nakano; Mitsuko Graham; Sei Kawahara; Masahiro Kawagoe
- Skating club: Sysmex FSC
- Began skating: 2009
- Retired: February 28, 2026

Medal record
Four Continents Championships
Gold medal – first place	2017 Gangneung	Singles
Gold medal – first place	2022 Tallinn	Singles
Silver medal – second place	2018 Taipei	Singles
Bronze medal – third place	2019 Anaheim	Singles
Grand Prix Final
Gold medal – first place	2022–23 Turin	Singles
Japan Championships
Silver medal – second place	2022–23 Osaka	Singles
Bronze medal – third place	2016–17 Osaka	Singles
World Team Trophy
Silver medal – second place	2017 Tokyo	Team
Bronze medal – third place	2023 Tokyo	Team

Mai Mihara (三原 舞依, Mihara Mai; born 22 August 1999) is a Japanese former competitive figure skater. She is the 2022 Grand Prix Final champion, a two-time Four Continents champion (2017, 2022), the 2018 Four Continents silver medalist, the 2019 Four Continents bronze medalist, the 2022 MK John Wilson Trophy champion, the 2022 Grand Prix of Espoo champion, a two-time Winter World University Games champion (2019, 2023), and a two-time Japanese national medalist (silver in 2022 and bronze in 2016).

== Personal life ==
Mihara was born on 22 August 1999 in Kobe, Hyōgo Prefecture, Japan. She began skating during her second year of elementary school, after watching Mao Asada's figure skating performances on TV. Mihara graduated from Ashiya High School in 2018, then obtained an undergraduate degree at Konan University in 2022.

Mihara suffers from juvenile idiopathic arthritis, skating despite the disease. In 2017, she signed an affiliation agreement with Sysmex, a Japanese company involved with healthcare and the promotion of healthy lifestyles. She has donated her hair three times as of 2022 towards the creation of wigs for individuals who have lost hair due to accidents or medical conditions such as alopecia.

After becoming the Four Continents champion in 2017 while skating to Cinderella, she earned the nickname "Cinderella on Ice".

== Career ==
=== Early years ===
Mihara began skating in 2007. In the 2012–13 season, she won the bronze medal in the Novice A category at the Japanese Novice Championships and placed 8th at the Japan Junior Championships.

=== 2013–2014 season ===
During the 2013–14 season, Mihara debuted on the ISU Junior Grand Prix (JGP) circuit, placing fifth in Minsk, Belarus. After winning the Japanese national silver medal on the junior level, she finished her season by placing twelfth on the senior level at the Japan Championships.

=== 2014–2015 season ===
Mihara started her season by placing sixth at her JGP event in Ljubljana, Slovenia. She then placed seventh at the Japan Junior Championships and ninth at the Japan Championships.

=== 2015–2016 season ===
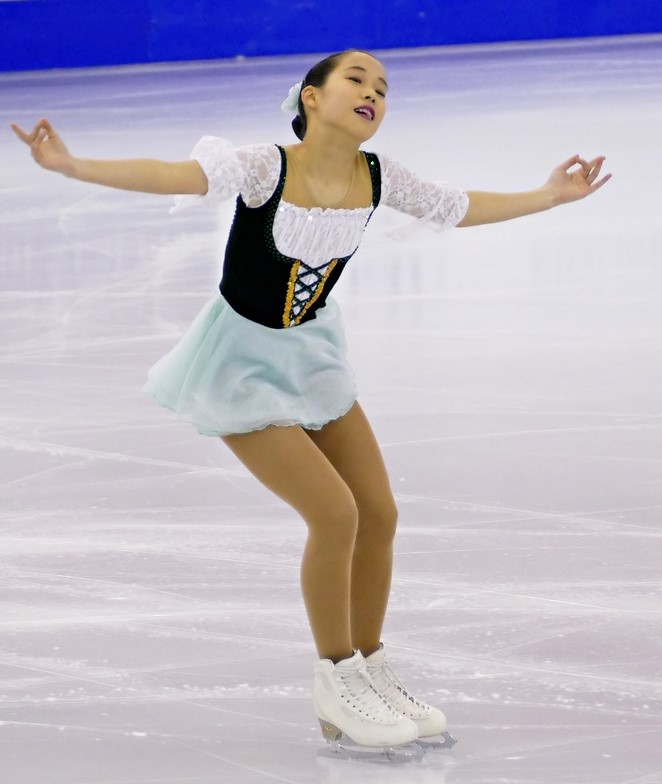
Mihara performing her free skate at the 2015–16 Junior Grand Prix Final

Mihara made her senior international debut in early August 2015, winning the Asian Open ahead of Riona Kato. She was awarded silver medals at her JGP events in Bratislava, Slovakia and Linz, Austria, and qualified for the 2015–16 JGP Final in Barcelona.

Mihara placed eighth at the 2015–16 Japanese Junior Championships and sixth at the JGP Final. She was diagnosed with arthritis in December, following the JGP Final.

=== 2016–2017 season: Four Continents champion ===
In September, Mihara competed at her first Challenger Series competition, the 2016 CS Nebelhorn Trophy. Ranked second in the short program and first in the free skate, she won the gold medal ahead of Russia's Elizaveta Tuktamysheva. Her Grand Prix debut came the following month at the 2016 Skate America. She was awarded the bronze medal, behind American skaters Ashley Wagner and Mariah Bell, after placing second in the short and third in the free. She finished fourth at her next Grand Prix assignment, the 2016 Cup of China.

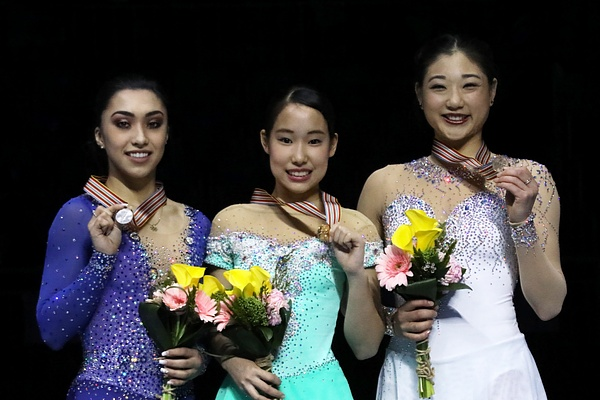
Mihara (center) with Gabrielle Daleman (left) and Mirai Nagasu (right) at the 2017 Four Continents Championships podium

In December 2016, Mihara took bronze at the Japan Championships, ranking fifth in the short and second in the free. In February 2017, she placed fourth in the short and first in the free at the Four Continents Championships in Gangneung, South Korea, outscoring Canada's Gabrielle Daleman by 3.94 points for the gold medal.

In March 2017, Mihara competed at the 2017 World Championships in Helsinki, Finland. Ranked fifteenth in the short program after doubling and falling on a planned triple flip, Mihara ranked fourth in the free skate and climbed to fifth overall. In April, she competed as part of Team Japan at the 2017 World Team Trophy. She achieved a personal best of 72.10 points in the short program and scored a Japanese national record of 146.17 points in the free skate. She finished second behind Medvedeva and 0.83 ahead of compatriot Wakaba Higuchi while Team Japan won the gold medal.

=== 2017–2018 season: Four Continents silver ===
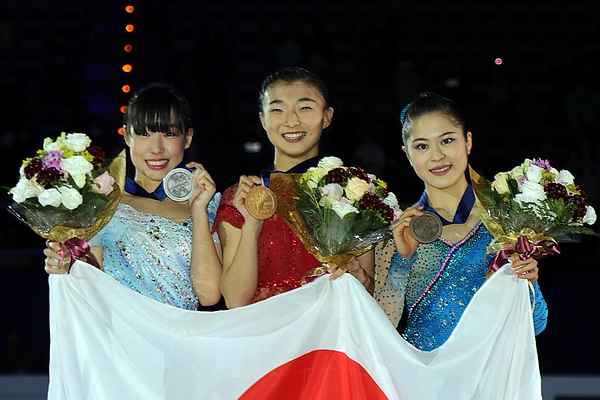
Mihara (left) with Kaori Sakamoto (center) and Satoko Miyahara (right) at the 2018 Four Continents Championships podium

Mihara won silver at the 2017 CS Autumn Classic International. She placed fourth at both of her Grand Prix assignments, 2017 Cup of China and 2017 Internationaux de France.

After a fifth-place finish at the 2017-18 Japan Figure Skating Championships she was assigned to the 2018 Four Continents Championships. At the championships, she was third in the short program behind countrywomen Satoko Miyahara and Kaori Sakamoto. After a second-place finish in the free skate and mistakes from Miyahara, Mihara rose to second place overall.

=== 2018–2019 season: Winter Universiade champion ===
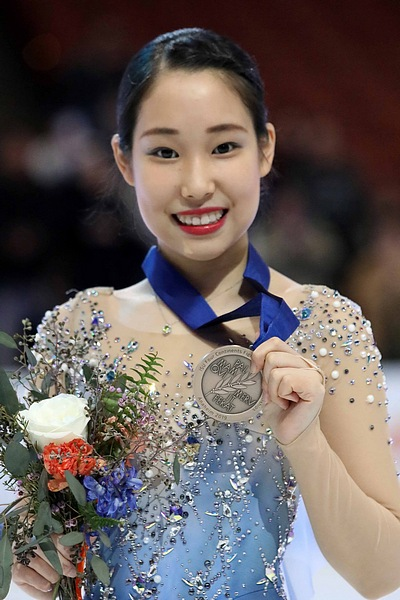
Mihara at the 2019 Four Continents Championships

Mihara won silver at the 2018 CS Nebelhorn Trophy. In the Grand Prix, she first competed at the 2018 NHK Trophy, the most hotly-contested ladies' event on the Grand Prix that year. She was third in the short program but dropped to fourth in the free skate and overall despite making only one error, a jump under rotation. She then narrowly placed second at the 2018 Internationaux de France, slightly behind compatriot Rika Kihira. Mihara said she was unsatisfied with her free skate in France but that "overall, it was a good experience for me, and I will continue to practice to gain more confidence."

At the 2018 Japan Championships, Mihara placed third in both programs, finishing fourth overall. She was again assigned to the Japanese team for the Four Continents Championships. Competing at Four Continents, she underrotated her opening combination jump to place eighth in the short program. She described this as an error she would not normally make, even in practice. Mihara then placed second in the free skate, winning the bronze medal overall, her third consecutive Four Continents podium finish. Mihara concluded her season at the 2019 Winter Universiade, where she won the ladies singles' title.

=== 2019–2020 season: Hiatus ===
Poor health forced Mihara to withdraw from both of her Grand Prix assignments, the 2019 Skate Canada International and 2019 Cup of China. She would not compete for the remainder of the season. Her longtime training mate and friend Kaori Sakamoto would subsequently feel that Mihara's absence from the rink contributed to Sakamoto's lackluster results.

=== 2020–2021 season: Return to competition ===
Mihara returned to competition domestically, winning the bronze medal at the Kinki Regional Championships and then silver at the Western Sectionals. With the COVID-19 pandemic affecting international travel, the ISU designed the Grand Prix primarily based on geographic location, and Mihara was one of eleven Japanese skaters assigned to the 2020 NHK Trophy alongside South Korean You Young. She placed seventh in the short program. Mihara was third in the free skate, rising to fourth place overall, slightly more than four points behind bronze medalist Rino Matsuike. Addressing her return to competition post-illness, she said, "the crowd welcomed me back, and I can't thank them enough."

Competing at the 2020–21 Japan Championships, Mihara was third in the short program with a clean skate. In the free skate, she doubled a planned triple Lutz and ranked seventh in that segment, dropping to fifth place overall.

=== 2021–2022 season: Four Continents champion ===
Beginning the season at the Olympic test event, the 2021 CS Asian Open Trophy, Mihara won the gold medal. She was initially assigned to only one Grand Prix event, the 2021 Cup of China, which was subsequently replaced by the 2021 Gran Premio d'Italia. Upon Rika Kihira's withdrawal from the 2021 Skate Canada International due to ankle injury, Mihara was named to replace her. Mihara was seventh in the short program at Skate Canada International despite a clean skate but rose to fourth overall with a third-place free skate. She finished 4.53 points behind bronze medalist Alena Kostornaia, with new personal bests in the free skate and total score. Competing in Italy the following week, she again placed fourth, setting new personal bests in the free skate and total score. Speaking afterward, Mihara said she hoped to regain more power and speed.

At the 2021–22 Japan Championships, the final national qualification event for the 2022 Winter Olympics, Mihara placed fifth in the short program. She was fifth as well in the free skate segment, making a notable error by performing only a single Axel instead of a planned double in combination with a triple toe loop. She finished fourth overall, less than four points behind bronze medalist Mana Kawabe. She was named as an alternate for the Japanese Olympic team and assigned to compete at the 2022 Four Continents Championships. Mihara won both segments of the competition to take her second Four Continents gold, as well as a fourth medal at the event overall. She reflected on her comeback to the sport, saying, "I was well supported, surrounded by very warm people, and it showed me how lucky I am. I was happy to come back."

=== 2022–2023 season: Grand Prix Final champion ===
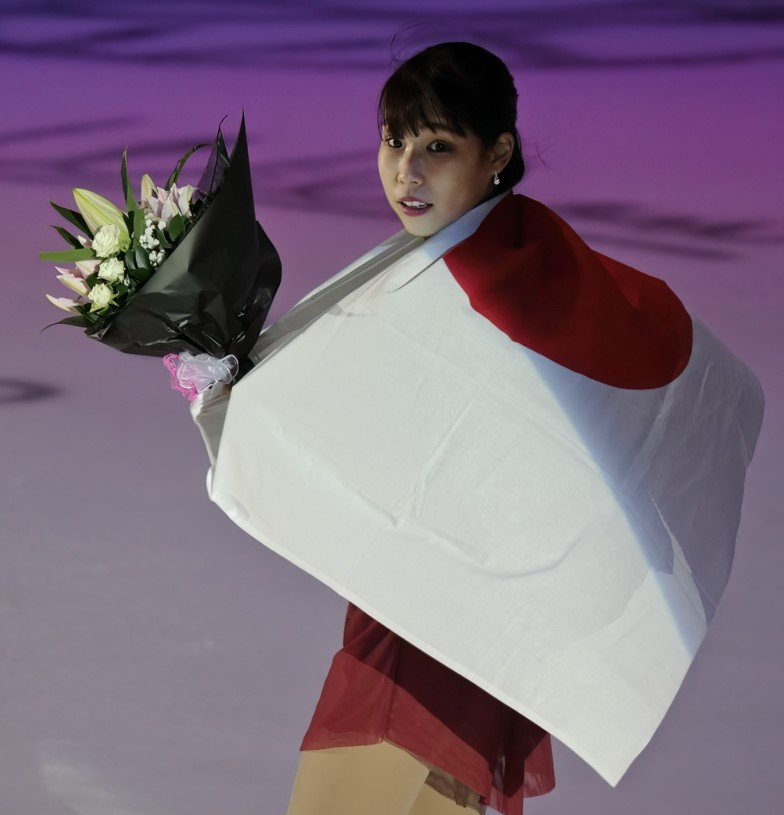
Mai Mihara during the medal ceremony at the 2022 MK John Wilson Trophy

Mihara began the season on the Grand Prix at the 2022 MK John Wilson Trophy in Sheffield. Despite an error on the triple flip, she won the short program, finishing 0.17 points ahead of American skater Isabeau Levito. She won the free program by a wider margin after a clean skate, taking her first Grand Prix gold medal. Mihara reflected that her win at the event was "maybe the biggest happiness it gave to me". Her second assignment, the 2022 Grand Prix of Espoo, was widely regarded as a contest between her and Belgium's Loena Hendrickx, the reigning World silver medalist who had earlier won the 2022 Grand Prix de France. Mihara placed second in the short program, 1.30 points behind Hendrickx. Both she and Hendrickx made errors in the free skate segment, but Mihara took first overall, earning her second gold medal and qualifying to the Grand Prix Final for the first time in her career. She cited "a lot of regrets" about the free skate but said she was "happy to go to the Grand Prix Final."

With the Final being held in Turin, Mihara was able to train with longtime friend and fellow qualifier Kaori Sakamoto in the leadup, having not been able to train together for "such a long time." Mihara said she found it "very gratifying." She finished second in the short program, 1.28 points behind Sakamoto and only 0.34 points ahead of third-place Hendrickx. Her score was a new personal best in the segment of 74.58. Mihara went on to finish first in what the ISU itself characterized as a "turbulent" free skate segment, despite underrotating one jump and falling out of another, while frontrunner Sakamoto dropped off the podium entirely. Mihara called the result "unbelievable." The Olympic Channel concluded, "Mihara Mai is having the season of her dreams."

Following her victory at the Final, Mihara entered the 2022–23 Japan Championships as a title contender. She finished second in the short program with a 74.70 score, 3.09 points behind Sakamoto, after the second part of her jump combination was called underrotated. She was second in the free skate as well, albeit 10.03 points behind Sakamoto, winning the silver medal and standing on the Japanese national podium for the first time in six years.

Competing at her second Winter World University Games (formerly Universiade), this time held in Lake Placid, Mihara finished second in the short program behind Sakamoto. She won the free skate, taking the gold medal for a second time. She was on the third woman to win the event twice, after Miwa Fukuhara and Tonia Kwiatkowski. Mihara next appeared at the International Challenge Cup at the end of February, winning the silver medal. Sakamoto and Mana Kawabe joined her on the podium in a Japanese sweep of the medals. She noted that she had missed some training recently as a result of influenza.

The 2023 World Championships were scheduled to take place on home ice in Saitama, with Mihara attending the event for the first time since 2017. She finished third in the short program, winning a bronze small medal, despite underrotating the second part of her combination. Several errors in the free skate dropped her to fifth. Afterwards, Mihara said she was " so frustrated, so much that I can't cry," adding that "one of my weaknesses is making mistakes in the last important event. I feel that I still have a long way to go to become a top athlete"

Mihara was named to compete at the World Team Trophy for the first time in six years, and said she was hoping to end her season on a high note following frustration with her performance in Saitama. After making two errors on her jump combination in the short program, she placed fifth in that segment. She was fifth in the free skate as well, dealing with some difficult jump landings. Team Japan won the bronze medal.

=== 2023–2024 season: Injury struggles ===
Mihara was scheduled to begin the season at the 2023 CS Finlandia Trophy in October, but a "nagging" right ankle injury forced her to withdraw from that event. She subsequently withdrew also from her first Grand Prix assignment, the 2023 Cup of China, saying "I have done everything I can to treat and prepare for competition but have had to make the frustrating decision to withdraw. I hope I am raring to go on the next stage and that I can deliver a perfect performance." She was able to compete at the 2023 NHK Trophy, finishing in eighth place. Mihara said she "was very worried, but I really wanted to skate, do my best and not give up. I'm happy I made it."

At the 2023–24 Japan Championships, Mihara finished fourth in the short program despite quarter-underrotation calls on two of her triple jumps and an incorrect edge call. She had two quarter-underrotation calls in the free skate as well, coming fifth overall. Reflecting on her season, Mihara said she "didn't have many satisfying run-throughs" in the leadup to the championships, adding "I'm very relieved that I made it to the end thanks to my coaches and everyone's support."

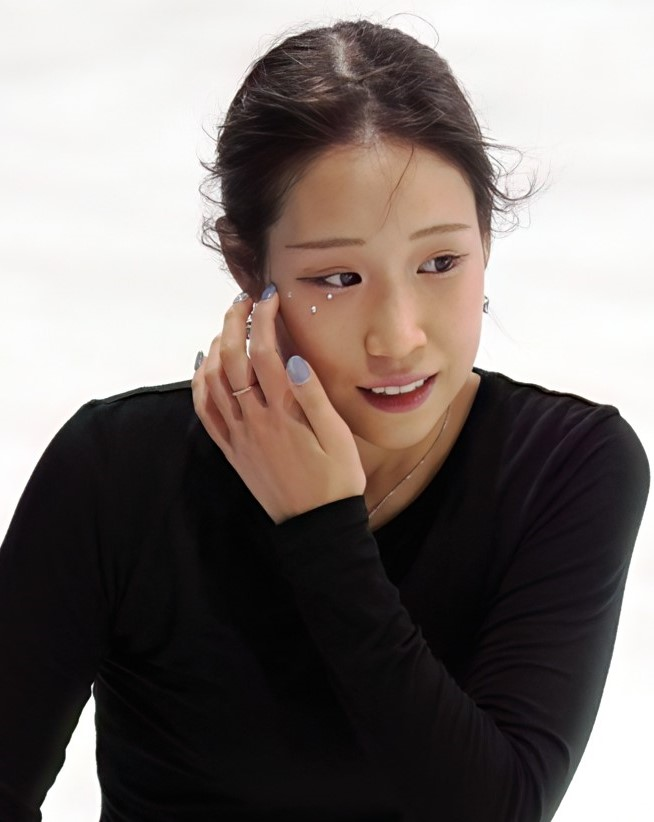
Mai Mihara during practice at the 2024 Grand Prix de France

Mihara was assigned to finish the season at the 2024 Four Continents Championships, where she came fifth in the short program despite falling on her jump combination. A seventh-place free skate, in which she performed only three clean triple jumps after doubling three other planned ones, saw her seventh overall. Mihara assessed afterward that "I don't think I can finish here after all. I hope I can get my mind and body back together and move on to next season and beyond."

=== 2024–2025 season: Continued injury struggles ===
Still not fully recovered from the stress fracture in her right ankle that she had sustained the previous season, Mihara began the season by winning bronze at the 2024 Asian Open Trophy. Going on to compete on the 2024–25 Grand Prix circuit, Mihara would finish seventh at the 2024 Grand Prix de France and eighth at the 2024 Finlandia Trophy.

In late December, Mihara competed at the 2024–25 Japan Championships, where she placed twenty-third in the short program after falling on two jump attempts. She withdrew before the free skate due to the worsening condition of her ankle injury as well as a recently sustained injury to her hip joint.

=== 2025–2026 season: Retirement ===
Prior to the 2025–26 Japan Championships, Mihara announced that it would be her final competitive season. At the event in late December, she finished in tenth place overall. Following the event, she shared, "I think I had a very happy competitive career... As I went into my final spin, I heard a huge round of applause... I was so happy, even though I was concerned about my level and rotation until the very end. After I struck my final pose, tears welled up in my eyes, to my surprise. When I was giving my speech, I could hardly see in front of me, but the audience was applauding all the way up, and I will never forget the happy sight I saw when I took my final bow."

She confirmed her retirement from competitive figure skating on 28 February 2026.

== Programs ==
Season	Short program	Free skating	Exhibition
2025–2026	Merry Christmas, Mr. Lawrence (from Merry Christmas, Mr. Lawrence) by Ryuichi Sakamoto choreo. by David Wilson	The Planets; II. Venus, the Bringer of Peace; III. Mercury, the Winged Messenger; IV. Jupiter, the Bringer of Jollity by Gustav Holst performed by Toronto Symphony Orchestra & Peter Oundjian; I Vow to Thee, My Country by Gustav Holst performed by Katherine Jenkins, Anthony Ingliss, & Prague Symphony Orchestra choreo. by David Wilson	
2024–2025	GRIEF by Tony Ann choreo. by Misha Ge	Red Violin by Joaquín Rodrigo & Ikuko Kawai choreo. by David Wilson	Survivor by Destiny's Child performed by 2WEI ft. Edda Hayes choreo. by Kana Muramoto
2023–2024	Merry Christmas, Mr. Lawrence (from Merry Christmas, Mr. Lawrence) by Ryuichi Sakamoto choreo. by David Wilson; To Love You More by Celine Dion choreo. by Jeffrey Buttle	The Planets; II. Venus, the Bringer of Peace; III. Mercury, the Winged Messenger; IV. Jupiter, the Bringer of Jollity by Gustav Holst performed by Toronto Symphony Orchestra & Peter Oundjian; I Vow to Thee, My Country by Gustav Holst performed by Katherine Jenkins, Anthony Ingliss, & Prague Symphony Orchestra choreo. by David Wilson	Hana by Rimi Natsukawa choreo. by Akiko Suzuki; Shake It Off by Taylor Swift choreo. by Jason Brown
2022–2023	Merry Christmas, Mr. Lawrence (from Merry Christmas, Mr. Lawrence) by Ryuichi Sakamoto choreo. by David Wilson	El amor brujo by Manuel de Falla choreo. by David Wilson	Sakura by Naotarō Moriyama performed by André Rieu; Never Enough (from The Greatest Showman) by Loren Allred choreo. by David Wilson; Amazing Grace performed by Celtic Woman
2021–2022	I Dreamed a Dream (from Les Misérables) by Claude-Michel Schönberg choreo. by David Wilson	Fairy of the Forest; Galaxy by Yuko Toyoda choreo. by Lori Nichol	Never Enough (from The Greatest Showman) by Loren Allred choreo. by David Wilson
2020–2021	It's Magic (from Romance on the High Seas) performed by Doris Day choreo. by David Wilson	Fairy of the Forest; Galaxy by Yuko Toyoda choreo. by Lori Nichol	Hero by Mariah Carey
2019–2020	Did not compete in this season		
2018–2019	It's Magic (from Romance on the High Seas) performed by Doris Day choreo. by David Wilson	The Mission; Carlotta by Ennio Morricone; Gabriel's Oboe (Whispers in a Dream) performed by Hayley Westenra; Vita Nostra by Ennio Morricone choreo. by David Wilson	Hero by Mariah Carey; Cinderella by Patrick Doyle choreo. by Yuka Sato
2017–2018	Libertango by Astor Piazzolla choreo. by Benoit Richaud	The Mission; Carlotta by Ennio Morricone; Gabriel's Oboe (Whispers in a Dream) performed by Hayley Westenra; Vita Nostra by Ennio Morricone choreo. by David Wilson	Cinderella by Patrick Doyle choreo. by Yuka Sato; La Califfa by Sarah Brightman
2016–2017	Introduction and Rondo Capriccioso by Camille Saint-Saëns choreo. by Massimo Scali	Cinderella by Patrick Doyle choreo. by Yuka Sato	Méditation (Thaïs) by Jules Massenet; Le Jazz Hot! (from Victor/Victoria) performed by Julie Andrews; Caprice No. 24 by Niccolò Paganini performed by Bilen Yildirir
2015–2016	Introduction and Rondo Capriccioso by Camille Saint-Saëns choreo. by Massimo Scali	Giselle by Adolphe Adam choreo. by Marina Zueva, Yukina Ota, Kawagoe Masahiro	
2014–2015	Les Filles de Cadix by Léo Delibes performed by Deanna Durbin choreo. by Kawagoe Masahiro	Giselle by Adolphe Adam choreo. by Marina Zueva, Yukina Ota, Kawagoe Masahiro	Le Jazz Hot! (from Glee) performed by Chris Colfer
2013–2014	Sakura by Naotarō Moriyama choreo. by Kawagoe Masahiro	West Side Story by Leonard Bernstein choreo. by Kawagoe Masahiro	Disney medley by Frank Churchill

== Competitive highlights ==
- GP – Event of the ISU Grand Prix Series
- JGP – Event of the ISU Junior Grand Prix Series
- CS – Event of the ISU Challenger Series
- TBD – Assigned
- WD – Withdrew from competition
- C – Cancelled
- Medals at team events are awarded for the team results only. Individual placements at team events are listed in parentheses.

Competition placements at senior level
Season	2013–14	2014–15	2015–16	2016–17	2017–18	2018–19	2019–20	2020–21	2021–22	2022–23	2023–24	2024–25	2025–26
World Championships				5th						5th			
Four Continents Championships				1st	2nd	3rd			1st		7th		
Grand Prix Final										1st			
Japan Championships	12th	9th		3rd	5th	4th		5th	4th	2nd	5th	WD	10th
World Team Trophy				1st (2nd)						3rd (5th)			
GP Cup of China				4th	4th		WD		C		WD		
GP Finland										1st		8th	
GP France					4th	2nd						7th	
GP Italy									4th				
GP NHK Trophy						4th		4th			8th		
GP Skate America				3rd									
GP Skate Canada							WD		4th				
GP Wilson Trophy										1st			
CS Autumn Classic					2nd								
CS Finlandia Trophy											WD		
CS Nebelhorn Trophy				1st		2nd							
Asian Open Trophy			1st						1st			3rd	
Challenge Cup										2nd			
Coupe du Printemps					1st								
Japan Open					2nd (2nd)					3rd (5th)			
World University Games						1st				1st			

Competition placements at junior level
Season	2012–13	2013–14	2014–15	2015–16
Junior Grand Prix Final				6th
Japan Championships	8th	2nd	7th	8th
JGP Austria				2nd
JGP Belarus		5th		
JGP Slovakia				2nd
JGP Slovenia			6th	
Asian Open Trophy		2nd		
Challenge Cup		4th		
Gardena Spring Trophy			1st	

== Detailed results ==
ISU personal best scores in the +5/-5 GOE System
Segment	Type	Score	Event
Total	TSS	218.08	2022 Four Continents Championships
Short program	TSS	74.58	2022–23 Grand Prix Final
Short program	TES	39.87	2022–23 Grand Prix Final
Short program	PCS	34.71	2022–23 Grand Prix Final
Free skating	TSS	145.41	2022 Four Continents Championships
Free skating	TES	77.01	2021 Gran Premio d'Italia
Free skating	PCS	70.78	2022 MK John Wilson Trophy

ISU personal best scores in the +3/-3 GOE System
Segment	Type	Score	Event
Total	TSS	218.27	2017 World Team Trophy
Short program	TSS	72.10	2017 World Team Trophy
Short program	TES	39.22	2017 World Team Trophy
Short program	PCS	32.88	2017 World Team Trophy
Free skating	TSS	146.17	2017 World Team Trophy
Free skating	TES	76.07	2017 World Team Trophy
Free skating	PCS	70.10	2017 World Team Trophy

=== Senior level ===
Small medals for short and free programs awarded only at ISU Championships. At team events, medals awarded for team results only.

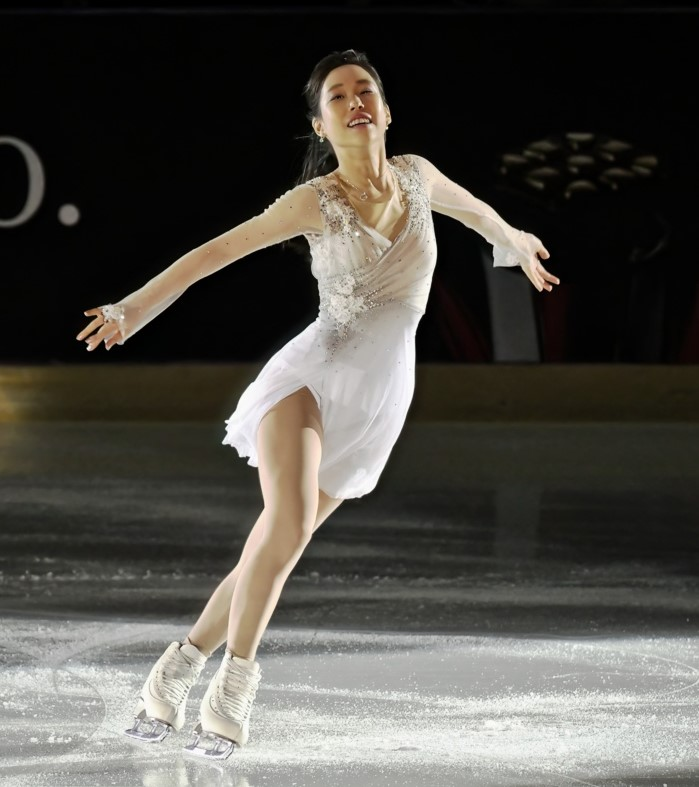
Mihara performing her exhibition program at the 2022 MK John Wilson Trophy

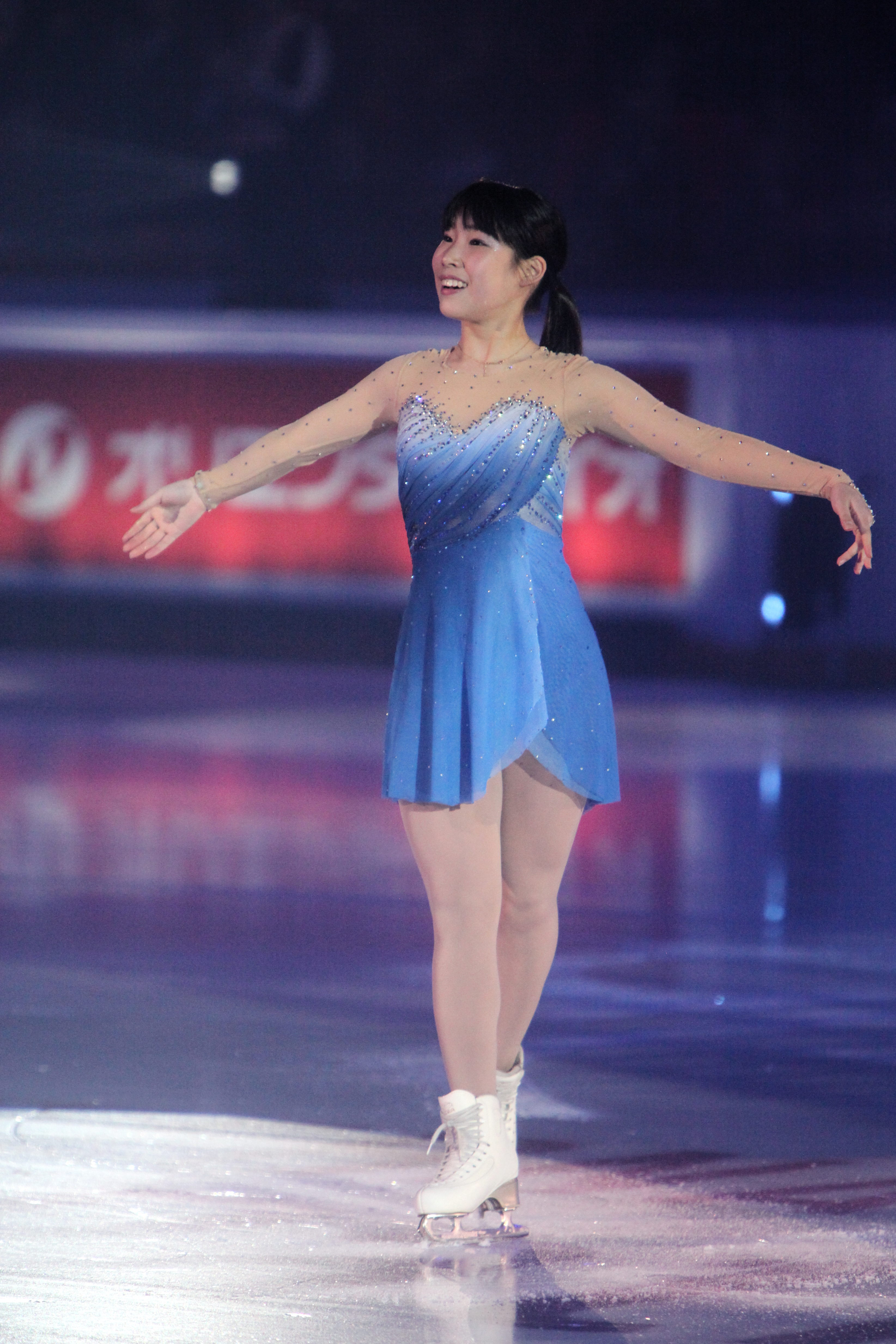
Mihara performing her exhibition program at the 2018 Internationaux de France

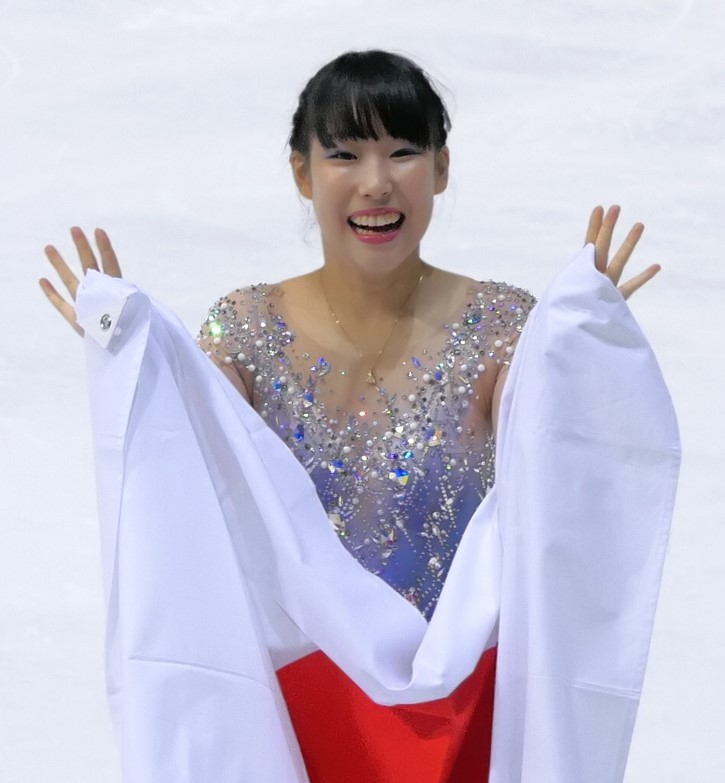
Mihara at the 2018 Internationaux de France

Results in the 2013–14 season
Date	Event	SP		FS		Total	
Date	Event	P	Score	P	Score	P	Score
Dec 20–23, 2013	2013–14 Japan Championships	20	45.51	8	106.99	12	152.50

Results in the 2014–15 season
Date	Event	SP		FS		Total	
Date	Event	P	Score	P	Score	P	Score
Dec 26–28, 2014	2014–15 Japan Championships	13	53.23	9	105.88	9	158.81

Results in the 2015–16 season
Date	Event	SP		FS		Total	
Date	Event	P	Score	P	Score	P	Score
Aug 5–8	(Thailand) 2015 Asian Open Trophy	1	53.92	1	105.08	1	159.00

Results in the 2016–17 season
Date	Event	SP		FS		Total	
Date	Event	P	Score	P	Score	P	Score
Sep 22–24, 2016	(Germany) 2016 CS Nebelhorn Trophy	2	63.11	1	125.92	1	189.03
Oct 21–23, 2016	(United States) 2016 Skate America	2	65.75	3	123.53	3	189.28
Nov 18–20, 2016	2016 Cup of China	3	68.48	4	122.44	4	190.92
Dec 22–25, 2016	2016–17 Japan Championships	5	65.91	2	132.26	3	198.17
Feb 14–19 2017	(South Korea) 2017 Four Continents Championships	4	66.51	1	134.34	1	200.85
Mar 29 – Apr 2, 2017	(Finland) 2017 World Championships	15	59.59	4	138.29	5	197.88
Apr 20–23, 2017	(Japan) 2021 World Team Trophy	3	72.10	2	146.17	2 (1)	218.27

Results in the 2017–18 season
Date	Event	SP		FS		Total	
Date	Event	P	Score	P	Score	P	Score
Sep 20–23, 2017	(Canada) 2017 CS Autumn Classic International	2	66.18	2	132.84	2	199.02
Oct 7 2017	2017 Japan Open	–	–	2	147.83	2	–
Nov 3–5, 2017	2017 Cup of China	7	66.90	3	139.17	4	206.07
Nov 17–19 2017	2017 Internationaux de France	4	64.57	5	137.55	4	202.12
Dec 21–24, 2017	2017–18 Japan Championships	7	64.27	3	140.40	5	204.67
Jan 22–28, 2018	(Taiwan) 2018 Four Continents Championships	3	69.84	2	140.73	2	210.57
Mar 16–18, 2018	(Luxembourg) 2018 Coupe du Printemps	2	72.98	1	142.51	1	215.49

Results in the 2018–19 season
Date	Event	SP		FS		Total	
Date	Event	P	Score	P	Score	P	Score
Sep 26–29, 2018	(Germany) 2018 CS Nebelhorn Trophy	3	70.94	2	138.28	2	209.22
Nov 9–11, 2018	(Japan) 2018 NHK Trophy	3	70.38	5	133.82	4	204.20
Nov 23–25, 2018	2018 Internationaux de France	1	67.95	3	134.86	2	202.81
Dec 20–24, 2018	2018–19 Japan Championships	3	72.88	3	147.92	4	220.80
Feb 7–10, 2019	(United States) 2019 Four Continents Championships	8	65.15	2	141.97	3	207.12
Mar 7–9, 2019	(Russia) 2019 Winter Universiade	1	75.92	2	144.76	1	220.68

Results in the 2020–21 season
Date	Event	SP		FS		Total	
Date	Event	P	Score	P	Score	P	Score
Nov 27–29, 2020	(Japan) 2020 NHK Trophy	7	63.41	3	131.32	4	194.73
Dec 24–27, 2020	2020–21 Japan Championships	3	69.55	7	134.10	5	203.65

Results in the 2021–22 season
Date	Event	SP		FS		Total	
Date	Event	P	Score	P	Score	P	Score
Oct 3, 2021	2021 Japan Open	–	–	5	124.24	1	–
Oct 13–17, 2021	(China) 2021 Asian Open Trophy	2	67.83	1	135.75	1	203.58
Oct 29–31, 2021	(Italy) 2021 Skate Canada International	7	67.89	3	142.12	4	210.01
Nov 5–7, 2021	(Italy) 2021 Gran Premio d'Italia	5	70.46	4	144.49	4	214.95
Dec 22–26, 2021	2021–22 Japan Championships	5	73.66	5	133.20	4	206.86
Jan 18–23, 2022	(Estonia) 2022 Four Continents Championships	1	72.62	1	145.41	1	218.03

Results in the 2022–23 season
Date	Event	SP		FS		Total	
Date	Event	P	Score	P	Score	P	Score
Nov 11–13, 2022	(United Kingdom) 2022 MK John Wilson Trophy	1	72.33	1	145.20	1	217.43
Nov 25–27, 2022	(Finland) 2022 Grand Prix of Espoo	2	73.58	1	130.56	1	204.14
Dec 8–11, 2022	(Italy) 2022–23 Grand Prix Final	2	74.58	1	133.59	1	208.17
Dec 21–25, 2022	2022–23 Japan Championships	2	74.70	2	145.23	2	219.93
Jan 13–15, 2023	(United States) 2023 Winter World University Games	2	75.60	1	145.58	1	221.18
Feb 23–26, 2023	(Netherlands) 2023 Challenge Cup	2	73.55	3	129.68	2	203.23
Mar 22–26, 2023	(Japan) 2023 World Championships	3	73.46	6	132.24	5	205.70
Apr 13–16, 2023	(Japan) 2023 World Team Trophy	5	66.85	5	131.21	5 (3)	198.06

Results in the 2023–24 season
Date	Event	SP		FS		Total	
Date	Event	P	Score	P	Score	P	Score
Nov 24–26, 2023	(Japan) 2023 NHK Trophy	4	62.82	9	109.82	8	172.64
Dec 20–24, 2023	2023–24 Japan Championships	4	67.70	5	131.86	5	199.56
Jan 30 – Feb 4, 2024	(China) 2024 Four Continents Championships	5	65.18	7	118.89	7	184.07

Results in the 2024–25 season
Date	Event	SP		FS		Total	
Date	Event	P	Score	P	Score	P	Score
Sep 2–6, 2024	(Hong Kong) 2024 Asian Open Trophy	2	61.49	3	115.85	3	177.34
Nov 1–3, 2024	2024 Grand Prix de France	7	61.12	8	113.81	7	174.93
Nov 15–17, 2024	(Finland) 2024 Finlandia Trophy	6	59.56	8	115.18	8	174.74
Dec 19–22, 2024	2024–25 Japan Championships	23	51.94	—N/a	—N/a	WD	—N/a

Results in the 2025–26 season
Date	Event	SP		FS		Total	
Date	Event	P	Score	P	Score	P	Score
Dec 18–21, 2025	2025–26 Japan Championships	13	62.77	11	127.86	10	190.63

=== Junior level ===
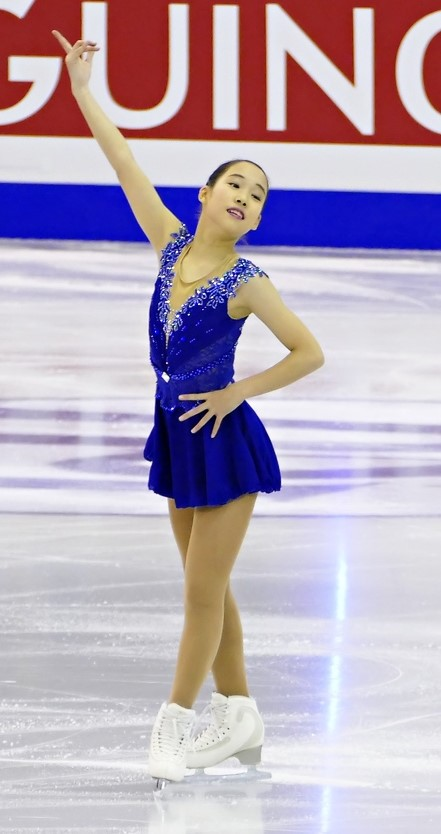
Mihara performing her short program at the 2015–16 Junior Grand Prix Final

2015–16 season
Date	Event	SP	FS	Total
10–13 December 2015	2015–16 JGP Final	6; 56.01	6; 110.24	6; 166.25
21–23 November 2015	2015-16 Japan Junior Championships	15; 49.08	7; 111.04	8; 160.12
9–12 September 2015	2015 JGP Austria	1; 63.55	2; 118.50	2; 182.05
19–22 August 2015	2015 JGP Slovakia	3; 60.81	2; 118.55	2; 179.36
2014–15 season
Date	Event	SP	FS	Total
23–24 March 2015	2015 Gardena Spring Trophy	1; 52.67	1; 113.89	1; 166.56
22–24 November 2014	2014–15 Japan Junior Championships	6; 53.47	8; 101.13	7; 154.60
27–30 August 2014	2014 JGP Slovenia	9; 44.68	4; 97.81	6; 142.49
2013–14 season
Date	Event	SP	FS	Total
6–9 March 2014	2014 International Challenge Cup	9; 38.01	1; 99.05	4; 137.06
22–24 November 2013	2013–14 Japan Junior Championships	2; 53.19	5; 100.66	2; 153.85
25–28 September 2013	2013 JGP Belarus	9; 45.94	4; 95.88	5; 141.82
8–11 August 2013	2013 Asian Open Trophy	2; 48.97	2; 96.06	2; 145.03
2012–13 season
Date	Event	SP	FS	Total
17–18 November 2012	2012–13 Japan Junior Championships	11; 47.53	8; 92.61	8; 140.14
