= Figure skating at the 2019 Winter Universiade =

Figure skating competition

Figure skating at the XXIX Winter Universiade
- Dates: March 6–9, 2019

Figure skating at the 2019 Winter Universiade was held on March 7-9 at the Platinum Arena in Krasnoyarsk, Russia. Medals were awarded in men's singles, ladies' singles, pairs, ice dancing, and synchronized skating.

== Regulations ==
Skaters who were born between 1 January 1994 and 31 December 2001 are eligible to compete at the Winter Universiade if they are registered as proceeding towards a degree or diploma at a university or similar institute, or obtained their academic degree or diploma in the year preceding the event.

In pairs and ice dance, only one partner must be a citizen of the country for which they are competing. Each nation may send a maximum of three entries per discipline, except in synchronized skating for which the maximum is two teams.

== Medalists ==
Event	Gold	Silver	Bronze
Men's singles	(Italy) Matteo Rizzo	(Russia) Maxim Kovtun	(Georgia (country)) Morisi Kvitelashvili
Ladies' singles	(Japan) Mai Mihara	(Kazakhstan) Elizabet Tursynbaeva	(Russia) Stanislava Konstantinova
Pairs	(Russia) Alisa Efimova / Alexander Korovin	(Russia) Anastasia Poluianova / Dmitry Sopot	(Kazakhstan) Zhansaya Adykhanova / Abish Baytkanov
Ice dancing	(Russia) Betina Popova / Sergey Mozgov	(Russia) Sofia Evdokimova / Egor Bazin	(France) Adelina Galyavieva / Louis Thauron
Sync skating	(Finland) Team Unique	(Finland) Marigold IceUnity	(Russia) Tatarstan

== Medal table ==
Rank	Nation	Gold	Silver	Bronze	Total
1	Russia (RUS)*	2	3	2	7
2	Finland (FIN)	1	1	0	2
3	Italy (ITA)	1	0	0	1
3	Japan (JPN)	1	0	0	1
5	Kazakhstan (KAZ)	0	1	1	2
6	France (FRA)	0	0	1	1
6	Georgia (GEO)	0	0	1	1
Totals (7 entries)		5	5	5	15

== Entries ==
Country	Men	Ladies	Pairs	Ice dancing	Synchronised
Armenia	Slavik Hayrapetyan	Anastasia Galustyan			
Australia		Amelia Scarlett Jackson		Matilda Friend / William Badaoui	
Austria	Manuel Drechsler	Lara Roth			
Brazil	Ruanh Oliveira	Ana Carla Decottignies			
Bulgaria		Simona Gospodinova		Mina Zdravkova / Christopher M. Davis	
China	Li Yuheng; Liu Runqi	Zhao Ziquan		Guo Yuzhu / Zhao Pengkun	
Czech Republic		Eliška Březinová			
Spain	Gaizka Madejon Cambra	Valentina Matos			
Estonia	Daniel Albert Naurits	Gerli Liinamäe			
Finland	Roman Galay			Juulia Turkkila / Matthias Versluis	Marigold IceUnity; Team Unique
France	Adrien Tesson	Maé-Bérénice Méité		Adelina Galyavieva / Louis Thauron; Julia Wagret / Pierre Souquet	
Georgia	Morisi Kvitelashvili				
Germany				Katharina Müller / Tim Dieck	
Hong Kong	Harry Hau Yin Lee; Lap Kan Lincoln Yuen	Joanna So			
Hungary				Emily Monaghan / Ilias Fourati	
Indonesia		Tasya Putri			
Iceland		Eva Dögg Sæmundsdóttir			
Italy	Mattia Dalla Torre; Matteo Rizzo	Elettra Maria Olivotto		Chiara Calderone / Pietro Papetti	
Japan	Shu Nakamura; Hiroaki Sato; Kazuki Tomono	Mai Mihara; Hina Takeno			
Kazakhstan	Artur Panikhin	Aiza Mambekova; Elizabet Tursynbaeva	Zhansaya Adykhanova / Abish Baytkanov		
Latvia		Angelīna Kučvaļska			
Liechtenstein		Romana Kaiser			
Lithuania		Elzbieta Kropa			
Malaysia		Sze Chyi Chew			
Mexico		María Paula Dieck			
Mongolia		Maral-Erdene Gansukh			
Norway		Camilla Gjersem			
Philippines		Mikayla Fabian			
Poland		Elżbieta Gabryszak			
Russia	Maxim Kovtun; Andrei Lazukin; Alexander Samarin	Stanislava Konstantinova; Maria Sotskova	Alisa Efimova / Alexander Korovin; Alexandra Koshevaya / Dmitry Bushlanov; Anastasia Poluianova / Dmitry Sopot	Sofia Evdokimova / Egor Bazin; Betina Popova / Sergey Mozgov; Anastasia Shpilevaya / Grigory Smirnov	Dream Team; Tatarstan
Slovenia		Maruša Udrih			
Switzerland	Tim Huber			Victoria Manni / Carlo Röthlisberger	
Slovakia	Marco Klepoch	Bronislava Dobiášová			
South Korea	Byun Se-jong; Lee June-hyoung	Kim Na-hyun; Park So-youn			
Thailand		Thita Lamsam			
Turkey	Burak Demirboğa	Sinem Kuyucu			
United Arab Emirates		Zahra Lari			

=== Changes to preliminary assignments ===
Date	Discipline	Withdrew	Reason/Other notes	Refs
February 6	All	Ukraine	Boycott of competition in Russia	

== Results ==
=== Men ===
Rank	Name	Nation	Total points	SP		FS	
1	Matteo Rizzo	Italy	273.54	2	90.78	1	182.76
2	Maxim Kovtun	Russia	259.49	1	91.74	3	167.75
3	Morisi Kvitelashvili	Georgia	258.02	5	82.71	2	175.31
4	Alexander Samarin	Russia	246.20	6	82.41	4	163.79
5	Andrei Lazukin	Russia	245.73	3	88.63	5	157.10
6	Kazuki Tomono	Japan	232.91	7	81.16	6	151.75
7	Hiroaki Sato	Japan	229.97	4	84.92	7	145.05
8	Shu Nakamura	Japan	214.50	9	73.39	8	141.11
9	Slavik Hayrapetyan	Armenia	214.30	8	78.73	10	135.57
10	Adrien Tesson	France	201.09	11	66.17	11	134.92
11	Mattia Dalla Torre	Italy	199.08	12	63.14	9	135.94
12	Daniel Albert Naurits	Estonia	189.51	10	70.91	13	118.60
13	Lee June-hyoung	South Korea	187.25	13	60.68	12	126.57
14	Burak Demirboğa	Turkey	176.22	15	60.13	14	116.09
15	Artur Panikhin	Kazakhstan	160.33	17	54.82	16	105.51
16	Liu Runqi	China	158.84	19	54.38	17	104.46
17	Byun Se-jong	South Korea	157.51	22	50.89	15	106.62
18	Tim Huber	Switzerland	156.38	16	55.38	18	101.00
19	Roman Galay	Finland	154.98	14	60.33	20	94.65
20	Marco Klepoch	Slovakia	151.68	21	53.82	19	97.86
21	Gaizka Madejon Cambra	Spain	148.37	18	54.82	22	93.55
22	Lap Kan Lincoln Yuen	Hong Kong	148.36	20	54.04	21	94.32
23	Li Yuheng	China	137.95	23	48.79	23	89.16
24	Harry Hau Yin Lee	Hong Kong	121.69	24	43.69	24	78.00
Did not advance to free skating
25	Manuel Drechsler	Austria		25	38.00	—	
26	Ruanh Oliveira	Brazil		26	12.41	—	

=== Ladies ===
Rank	Name	Nation	Total points	SP		FS	
1	Mai Mihara	Japan	220.68	1	75.92	2	144.76
2	Elizabet Tursynbaeva	Kazakhstan	214.77	4	67.57	1	147.20
3	Stanislava Konstantinova	Russia	205.91	2	70.25	3	135.66
4	Maé-Bérénice Méité	France	179.56	6	62.73	5	116.83
5	Park So-youn	South Korea	175.66	10	52.71	4	122.95
6	Hina Takeno	Japan	175.38	3	67.69	7	107.69
7	Maria Sotskova	Russia	170.20	7	58.43	6	111.77
8	Anastasia Galustyan	Armenia	161.89	5	64.15	10	97.74
9	Gerli Liinamäe	Estonia	157.16	13	50.88	8	106.28
10	Angelīna Kučvaļska	Latvia	157.10	8	55.14	9	101.96
11	Camilla Gjersem	Norway	143.42	11	52.31	11	91.11
12	Elżbieta Gabryszak	Poland	141.07	12	52.22	15	88.85
13	Eliška Březinová	Czech Republic	140.09	14	50.49	14	89.60
14	Valentina Matos	Spain	139.91	15	49.01	13	90.90
15	Elettra Maria Olivotto	Italy	139.21	16	48.17	12	91.04
16	Elzbieta Kropa	Lithuania	127.21	18	44.39	16	82.82
17	Aiza Mambekova	Kazakhstan	124.41	20	43.75	18	80.66
18	Bronislava Dobiášová	Slovakia	122.13	19	43.89	20	78.24
19	Lara Roth	Austria	121.57	17	46.72	21	74.85
20	Joanna So	Hong Kong	119.44	21	38.55	17	80.89
21	Kim Na-hyun	South Korea	116.46	23	36.14	19	80.32
22	Romana Kaiser	Liechtenstein	104.33	22	36.84	23	67.49
23	Sinem Kuyucu	Turkey	102.56	24	34.01	22	68.55
WD	Zhao Ziquan	China		9	54.17	withdrew	
Did not advance to free skating
25	Simona Gospodinova	Bulgaria		25	29.77	—	
26	Maruša Udrih	Slovenia		26	28.93	—	
27	Thita Lamsam	Thailand		27	27.19	—	
28	María Paula Dieck	Mexico		28	26.36	—	
29	Zahra Lari	United Arab Emirates		29	24.90	—	
30	Maral-Erdene Gansukh	Mongolia		30	24.75	—	
31	Tasya Putri	Indonesia		31	23.13	—	
32	Eva Dögg Sæmundsdóttir	Iceland		32	22.32	—	
33	Sze Chyi Chew	Malaysia		33	20.51	—	
34	Mikayla Fabian	Philippines		34	17.55	—	
35	Ana Carla Decottignies	Brazil		35	8.21	—	

=== Pairs ===
- Alexandra Koshevaya / Dmitry Bushlanov were disqualified for Koshevaya's violation of anti-doping rules.

Rank	Name	Nation	Total points	SP		FS	
1	Alisa Efimova / Alexander Korovin	Russia	171.01	2	57.72	1	113.29
2	Anastasia Poluianova / Dmitry Sopot	Russia	169.99	1	58.92	2	111.07
3	Zhansaya Adykhanova / Abish Baytkanov	Kazakhstan	83.28	3	27.64	3	55.64
DSQ *	Alexandra Koshevaya / Dmitry Bushlanov	Russia	~~151.78~~	DSQ	~~54.75~~	DSQ	~~97.03~~

=== Ice dance ===
Rank	Name	Nation	Total points	RD		FD	
1	Betina Popova / Sergey Mozgov	Russia	183.01	1	71.46	2	111.55
2	Sofia Evdokimova / Egor Bazin	Russia	181.33	2	68.32	1	113.01
3	Adelina Galyavieva / Louis Thauron	France	177.23	3	68.02	3	109.21
4	Juulia Turkkila / Matthias Versluis	Finland	171.22	4	63.80	4	107.42
5	Anastasia Shpilevaya / Grigory Smirnov	Russia	166.82	6	62.19	5	104.63
6	Julia Wagret / Pierre Souquet	France	164.21	7	60.73	6	103.48
7	Katharina Müller / Tim Dieck	Germany	161.27	5	62.68	7	98.59
8	Chiara Calderone / Pietro Papetti	Italy	151.76	8	59.60	8	92.16
9	Victoria Manni / Carlo Roethlisberger	Switzerland	145.65	9	56.62	9	89.03
10	Emily Monaghan / Ilias Fourati	Hungary	137.14	10	53.73	10	83.41
11	Yuzhu Guo / Pengkun Zhao	China	132.66	11	51.45	11	81.21
12	Matilda Friend / William Badaoui	Australia	120.38	13	44.44	12	75.94
13	Mina Zdravkova / Christopher M. Davis	Bulgaria	119.63	12	44.44	13	75.19

=== Synchronized ===
Rank	Name	Nation	Total points	SP		FS	
1	Team Unique	Finland	228.79	1	85.49	2	143.30
2	Marigold IceUnity	Finland	224.97	3	81.50	1	143.47
3	Tatarstan	Russia	218.22	2	82.23	3	135.99
4	Dream Team	Russia	119.32	4	39.23	4	80.09
