= 2024 Finlandia Trophy =

Figure skating competition

- Type: Grand Prix
- Date: November 15 – 17
- Season: 2024–25
- Location: Helsinki, Finland
- Host: Finnish Figure Skating Association
- Venue: Helsinki Ice Hall

Champions
- Men's singles: (Japan) Yuma Kagiyama
- Women's singles: (Japan) Hana Yoshida
- Pairs: (Canada) Deanna Stellato-Dudek and Maxime Deschamps
- Ice dance: (United Kingdom) Lilah Fear and Lewis Gibson
- Previous: 2023 Grand Prix of Espoo
- Next: 2025 Finlandia Trophy
- Previous Grand Prix: 2024 NHK Trophy
- Next Grand Prix: 2024 Cup of China

The 2024 Finlandia Trophy was the fifth event of the 2024–25 ISU Grand Prix of Figure Skating: a senior-level international invitational competition series. It was held at the Helsinki Ice Hall in Helsinki, Finland, from November 15–17. Medals were awarded in men's singles, women's singles, pair skating, and ice dance. Skaters also earned points toward qualifying for the 2024–25 Grand Prix Final.

== Entries ==
The International Skating Union announced the preliminary assignments on June 9, 2024.

Country	Men	Women	Pairs	Ice dance
Canada	—N/a		Kelly Ann Laurin; Loucas Éthier	Piper Gilles; Paul Poirier
Canada	—N/a		Deanna Stellato-Dudek; Maxime Deschamps	—N/a
Czech Republic	—N/a			Natálie Taschlerová; Filip Taschler
Estonia	Aleksandr Selevko	Niina Petrõkina	—N/a	
Finland	Makar Suntsev	Janna Jyrkinen	Milania Väänänen; Filippo Clerici	Yuka Orihara; Juho Pirinen
Finland	Valtter Virtanen	Olivia Lisko	—N/a	Juulia Turkkila; Matthias Versluis
Finland	—N/a	Nella Pelkonen	—N/a	—N/a
France	Kévin Aymoz	Lorine Schild	—N/a	
Great Britain	—N/a			Lilah Fear; Lewis Gibson
Hungary	—N/a		Maria Pavlova; Alexei Sviatchenko	—N/a
Italy	Daniel Grassl	Lara Naki Gutmann	Rebecca Ghilardi; Filippo Ambrosini	—N/a
Japan	Yuma Kagiyama	Rino Matsuike	Yuna Nagaoka; Sumitada Moriguchi	—N/a
Japan	Kazuki Tomono	Mai Mihara	—N/a	—N/a
Japan	Sōta Yamamoto	Hana Yoshida	—N/a	—N/a
Poland	Vladimir Samoilov	—N/a		
South Korea	Cha Jun-hwan	Yun Ah-sun	—N/a	Hannah Lim; Ye Quan
Switzerland	Lukas Britschgi	—N/a		
Ukraine	—N/a			Mariia Pinchuk; Mykyta Pogorielov
United States	Camden Pulkinen	Sarah Everhardt	Emily Chan; Spencer Akira Howe	Oona Brown; Gage Brown
United States	—N/a	Lindsay Thorngren	Naomi Williams; Lachlan Lewer	Eva Pate; Logan Bye
United States	—N/a	—N/a		Emilea Zingas; Vadym Kolesnik

=== Changes to preliminary assignments ===
Changes to preliminary assignments
Discipline	Withdrew		Added		Notes	Ref.
Discipline	Date	Skater(s)	Date	Skater(s)	Notes	Ref.
Women	—N/a		August 14	(Finland); Janna Jyrkinen	Host picks	
Women	—N/a		August 14	(Finland); Olivia Lisko	Host picks	
Women	September 3	(South Korea); You Young	September 10	(United States); Sarah Everhardt		
Women	November 4	(Belgium); Loena Hendrickx	November 5	(Italy); Lara Naki Gutmann		
Women	November 4	(United States); Isabeau Levito	November 6	(South Korea); Yun Ah-sun		
Pairs	November 7	(Australia); Anastasia Golubeva; Hektor Giotopoulos Moore	November 10	(Japan); Yuna Nagaoka; Sumitada Moriguchi	COVID-19 (Golubeva)	

== Results ==
=== Men's singles ===
Men's results
Rank	Skater	Nation	Total points	SP		FS	
1st place, gold medalist(s)	Yuma Kagiyama	Japan	263.09	1	103.97	5	159.12
2nd place, silver medalist(s)	Kévin Aymoz	France	259.15	3	85.13	2	174.02
3rd place, bronze medalist(s)	Daniel Grassl	Italy	258.55	6	77.91	1	180.64
4	Sōta Yamamoto	Japan	249.91	4	82.43	3	167.48
5	Lukas Britschgi	Switzerland	246.70	5	80.44	4	166.26
6	Kazuki Tomono	Japan	238.41	2	90.78	7	147.63
7	Aleksandr Selevko	Estonia	214.15	8	66.36	6	147.79
8	Vladimir Samoilov	Poland	205.47	9	65.46	8	140.01
9	Camden Pulkinen	United States	205.47	10	64.34	9	130.84
10	Makar Suntsev	Finland	180.48	11	59.58	10	120.90
11	Valtter Virtanen	Finland	166.25	12	57.28	11	108.25
WD	Cha Jun-hwan	South Korea	withdrew	7	77.33	withdrew from competition	

=== Women's singles ===
Women's results
Rank	Skater	Nation	Total points	SP		FS	
1st place, gold medalist(s)	Hana Yoshida	Japan	199.46	1	67.87	2	131.59
2nd place, silver medalist(s)	Rino Matsuike	Japan	199.20	4	64.82	1	134.38
3rd place, bronze medalist(s)	Lara Naki Gutmann	Italy	198.49	2	67.06	3	131.43
4	Sarah Everhardt	United States	191.97	3	66.28	5	124.89
5	Yun Ah-sun	South Korea	187.68	5	63.16	6	124.52
6	Lorine Schild	France	182.36	7	59.22	7	123.14
7	Niina Petrõkina	Estonia	178.66	11	53.76	4	124.90
8	Mai Mihara	Japan	174.74	6	59.56	8	115.18
9	Lindsay Thorngren	United States	170.64	8	57.37	9	113.27
10	Janna Jyrkinen	Finland	157.44	9	55.30	11	102.14
11	Nella Pelkonen	Finland	155.22	12	52.14	10	103.08
12	Olivia Lisko	Finland	153.67	10	54.68	12	98.99

=== Pairs ===
Pairs' results
Rank	Team	Nation	Total points	SP		FS	
1st place, gold medalist(s)	Deanna Stellato-Dudek; Maxime Deschamps	Canada	207.44	1	75.89	1	131.55
2nd place, silver medalist(s)	Maria Pavlova; Alexei Sviatchenko	Hungary	184.21	3	61.29	2	122.92
3rd place, bronze medalist(s)	Rebecca Ghilardi; Filippo Ambrosini	Italy	181.59	2	67.43	6	114.16
4	Kelly Ann Laurin; Loucas Éthier	Canada	178.57	4	60.45	4	118.12
5	Emily Chan; Spencer Akira Howe	United States	174.40	5	58.93	5	115.47
6	Yuna Nagaoka; Sumitada Moriguchi	Japan	171.80	8	51.75	3	120.05
7	Milania Väänänen; Filippo Clerici	Finland	160.73	6	54.33	7	106.40
8	Naomi Williams; Lachlan Lewer	United States	153.34	7	52.30	8	101.04

=== Ice dance ===
Ice dance results
Rank	Team	Nation	Total points	RD		FD	
1st place, gold medalist(s)	Lilah Fear; Lewis Gibson	Great Britain	203.22	2	82.03	1	121.19
2nd place, silver medalist(s)	Piper Gilles; Paul Poirier	Canada	200.79	1	84.65	4	116.14
3rd place, bronze medalist(s)	Juulia Turkkila; Matthias Versluis	Finland	196.60	3	78.31	2	118.29
4	Natálie Taschlerová; Filip Taschler	Czech Republic	190.43	4	75.50	5	114.93
5	Emilea Zingas; Vadym Kolesnik	United States	189.48	6	72.72	3	116.76
6	Yuka Orihara; Juho Pirinen	Finland	183.64	8	72.56	6	111.08
7	Eva Pate; Logan Bye	United States	180.35	7	72.58	7	107.77
8	Oona Brown; Gage Brown	United States	176.57	5	73.35	9	103.22
9	Hannah Lim; Ye Quan	South Korea	175.36	9	69.00	8	106.36
10	Mariia Pinchuk; Mykyta Pogorielov	Ukraine	134.34	10	54.39	10	79.95
