= Makar Suntsev =

Finnish figure skater

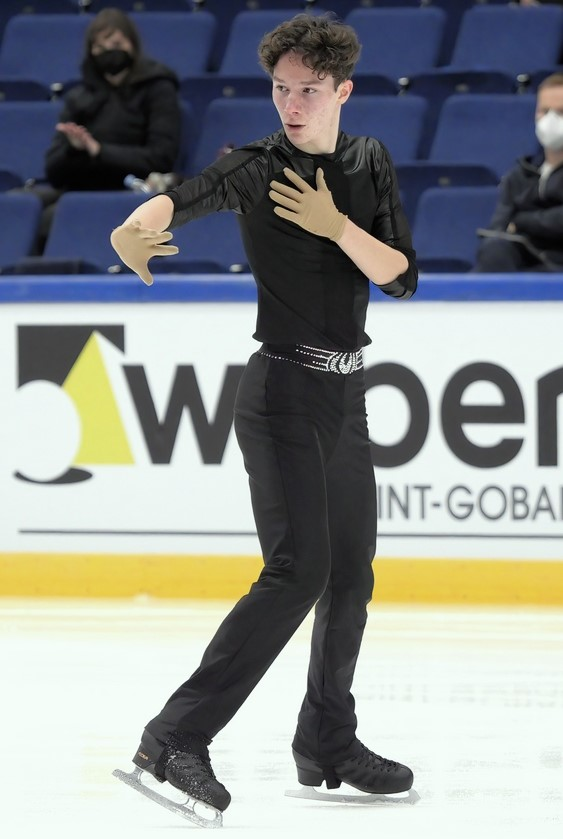
- Makar Suntsev at the 2021 Finlandia Trophy

Personal information
- Born: 10 April 2004 (age 22) Perm, Russia
- Home town: Kotka, Finland
- Height: 1.78 m (5 ft 10 in)

Figure skating career
- Country: Finland
- Discipline: Men's singles
- Coach: Tatiana Lebedeva; Liana Ocheretna; Aleksei Saks
- Skating club: Kotkan Taitoluistelu
- Began skating: 2008

Medal record
Finnish Championships
Gold medal – first place	2024 Helsinki	Singles
Silver medal – second place	2022 Pori	Singles
Silver medal – second place	2023 Joensuu	Singles
Silver medal – second place	2026 Lahti	Singles

Makar Suntsev (born 4 October 2004) is a Finnish figure skater. Born in Russia, he is the 2024 Finnish Champion, a two-time Finnish national silver medalist (2022, 2023), and a two-time bronze medalist at the Nordic Championship bronze medalist (2023 and 2024).

== Personal life ==
Suntsev was born on October 4, 2004, in Perm, Russia. He also has an older sister. At the age of five, Suntsev moved with his family to Kotka, Finland. He graduated from Karhula High School before enrolling at the Aalto University in 2024 to study business.

== Career ==
=== Early career ===
When he was a young child, Suntsev's mother, Tatiana Lebedeva, worked as a figure skating coach in Perm, Russia. After Suntsev turned three, Lebedeva started bringing him to the rink so he could sit at the sidelines while she coached. He began skating in 2008 at the age of four under his mother's tutelage. After relocating to Kotka, Finland, Lebedeva got a job as a coach at the Kotkan Taitoluistelu, where Suntsev would continue to train.

He debuted as a competitor on the novice level at the 2018 Nordic Championships, where he finished fifth.

=== 2018–19 season: Junior international debut ===
Moving up to the junior level, Suntsev competed at the 2019 Finnish Junior Championships and finished fourth. He subsequently finished fourth at the 2019 Nordic Championships and won the bronze medal at the 2019 Tallink Hotels Cup.

=== 2019–20 season: Junior Grand Prix debut ===
Suntsev started the season by debuting on the ISU Junior Grand Prix series, finishing twenty-fourth at 2019 JGP Poland. He would subsequently compete on the junior level at the 2019 Halloween Cup, where he placed eighth.

In December, he won the silver medal at the 2020 Finnish Junior Championships. He then continued competing on the junior international level, placing sixth at the 2020 Mentor Toruń Cup and fifth at the 2020 Nordic Championships.

=== 2020–21 season: Senior international debut ===
During this season, Suntsev only appeared at one competition, the 2021 Tallink Hotels Cup. He finished the event in sixth place.

=== 2021–22 season ===
Suntsev began the season by competing on the 2021–22 ISU Junior Grand Prix series, finishing sixth at the 2021 JGP France and fourteenth at the 2021 JGP Slovakia. He then made his senior international debut by competing on the 2021–22 ISU Challenger Series, placing twenty-second at the 2021 CS Finlandia Trophy, twenty-first at the 2021 CS Cup of Austria, and twentieth at the 2021 CS Golden Spin of Zagreb. Between the latter two events, Suntsev finished sixth at the 2021 Tallinn Trophy.

In December, Suntsev would win his first senior national medal, a silver at the 2021 Finnish Championships. He subsequently finished sixth at the 2022 Sofia Trophy, eighth at the 2022 Bellu Memorial, and sixth at the 2022 Tallink Hotels Cup.

Selected to represent Finland at the 2022 World Junior Championships in Tallinn, Estonia, Suntsev finished in twenty-sixth place.

=== 2022–23 season ===
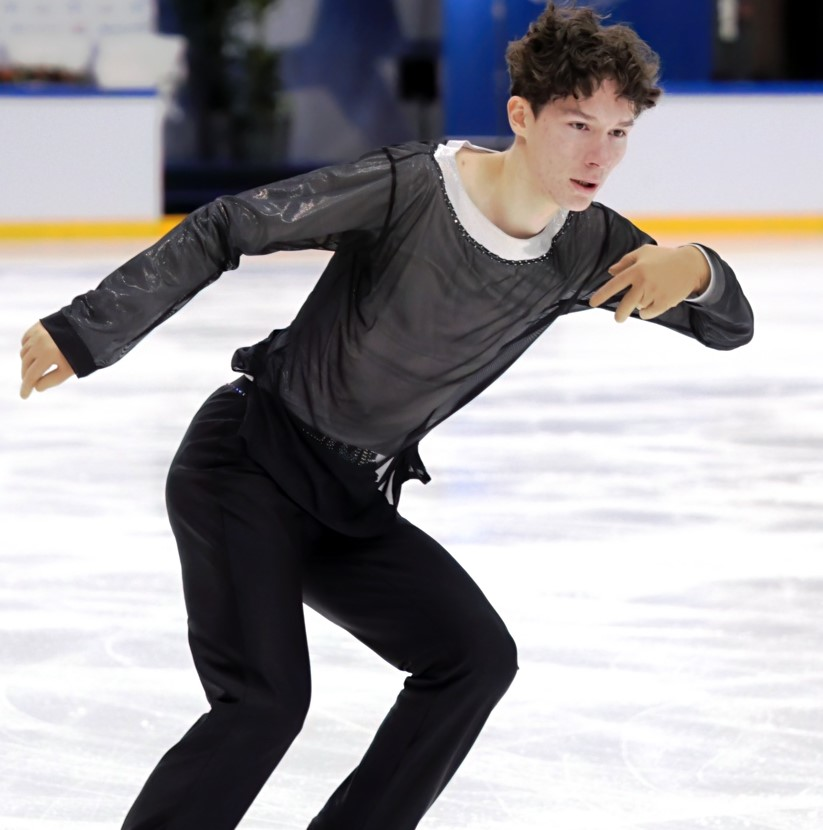
Suntsev at the 2022 CS Finlandia Trophy

Suntsev started the season by competing on the 2022–23 ISU Junior Grand Prix series, finishing eleventh at 2022 JGP France and fifth at 2022 JGP Latvia. He then went on to compete on the 2022–23 ISU Challenger Series, finishing thirteenth at the 2022 CS Nebelhorn Trophy, sixteenth at the 2022 CS Finlandia Trophy, and twenty-first at the 2022 CS Warsaw Cup. One week following the latter event, Suntsev placed fifth at the 2022 Tallinn Trophy.

In mid-December, Suntsev won his second consecutive national silver medal at the 2023 Finnish Championships. He subsequently placed twenty-sixth at the 2023 Winter World University Games, won bronze at the 2023 Nordic Championships, and finished ninth at the 2023 Tallink Hotels Cup.

Suntsev closed the season by competing at the 2023 World Junior Championships in Calgary, Alberta, Canada, where he placed twenty-ninth.

=== 2023–24 season: Finnish national title, European Championships debut ===
Suntsev began the season by the season by competing at the 2023–24 ISU Challenger Series, finishing thirteenth at the 2023 CS Lombardia Trophy and tenth at the 2023 CS Finlandia Trophy. Following a fourth-place finish at the 2023 Tirnavia Ice Cup, Suntsev was selected as a host representative to compete at the 2023 Grand Prix of Espoo. He finished in twelfth at the event. Going on to compete at the 2023 CS Golden Spin of Zagreb, Suntsev placed seventh.

In mid-December, Suntsev won the senior national title at the 2024 Finnish Championships and as a result, was selected to compete at the 2024 European Championships in Kaunas, Lithuania. He finished in twentieth place overall.

One month later, Suntsev would win the bronze medal at the 2024 Nordic Championships and sixth at the 2024 Tallink Hotels Cup.

Finnish national silver medalist, Valtter Virtanen, was ultimately selected as the men's singles skating representative to compete at the 2024 World Championships due to Suntsev failing to score minimum technical scores to compete at the World Championships.

=== 2024–25 season ===
During the summer off-season, Suntsev moved from his hometown of Kotka to Espoo to attend university in the latter city. While he continued being coached by his mother, Liana Ocheretna and Aleksei Saks also began coaching him in Vantaa, a city closer to his school.

He started the season by competing on the 2024–25 ISU Challenger Series, finishing sixteenth at the 2024 CS Lombardia Trophy and fifth at the 2024 CS Budapest Trophy. Assigned to the 2024 GP Finlandia Trophy, Suntsev came in tenth place.

== Programs ==
Season	Short program	Free skate	Exhibition	Ref.
2021–22	Angelica (from Pirates of the Caribbean: On Stranger Tides) by Hans Zimmer choreo. by Monica Lindfors & Leonid Sviridenko	I Love You (Acoustic - Quinted Version) by Woodkid choreo. by Anastasia Bunina	—N/a	
2022–23	Angelica (from Pirates of the Caribbean: On Stranger Tides) by Hans Zimmer choreo. by Monica Lindfors & Leonid Sviridenko	Knee 5 by Philip Glass Ensemble; Naqoyqatsi (from Naqoyqatsi) by Philip Glass Ensemble, Yo-Yo Ma, & Michael Riesman; Dawn of Faith by Eternal Eclipse choreo. by Benoît Richaud	—N/a	
2023–24	Moonlight Sonata by Ludwig van Beethoven choreo. by Adam Solya	Ghosts of Japan by Derek Fiechter; Taki Burossamu Taki by That's It; The Geisha and the Samurai by Stefan Johansson; The Way of the Samurai by Ilan Eshkeri choreo. by Adam Solya	Real Gone by Sheryl Crow; Life Is a Highway performed by Rascal Flatts	
2024–25	Moonlight Sonata by Ludwig van Beethoven choreo. by Adam Solya	Ghosts of Japan by Derek Fiechter; Taki Burossamu Taki by That's It; The Geisha and the Samurai by Stefan Johansson; The Way of the Samurai by Ilan Eshkeri choreo. by Adam Solya		
2025–26	Purple Rain by Prince choreo. by Fanny Lindfors	Concierto de Aranjuez by Joaquín Rodrigo performed by Paco de Lucía & Rob Colling choreo. by Fanny Lindfors		

== Competitive highlights ==
- GP – Event of the ISU Grand Prix Series
- JGP – Event of the ISU Junior Grand Prix Series
- CS – Event of the ISU Challenger Series
- TBD – Assigned
- WD – Withdrew from competition

Competition placements at senior level
Season	2020–21	2021–22	2022–23	2023–24	2024–25	2025–26	2026–27
European Championships				20th			
Finnish Championships		2nd	2nd	1st		2nd	
GP Finland				12th	10th		
CS Budapest Trophy					5th		
CS Cup of Austria		21st					
CS Finlandia Trophy		22nd	16th	10th			
CS Golden Spin of Zagreb		20th		7th	17th		
CS Lombardia Trophy				13th	16th	14th	
CS Nebelhorn Trophy			13th				
CS Tallinn Trophy						13th	7th
CS Warsaw Cup			21st			14th	
Bellu Memorial		8th					
Nordic Championships			3rd	3rd			
Road to 26 Trophy					11th		
Skate Helena					2nd		
Sofia Trophy		6th				4th	
Tallink Hotels Cup	6th	6th	9th	6th	3rd		
Tallinn Trophy		6th	5th				
Tirnavia Ice Cup				4th			
Volvo Open Cup						6th	7th
Winter University Games			26th		16th		

Competition placements at junior level
Season	2018–19	2019–20	2021–22	2022–23
World Junior Championships			26th	29th
Finnish Championships	4th	2nd		
JGP France			6th	11th
JGP Latvia				5th
JGP Poland		24th		
JGP Slovakia			14th	
Halloween Cup		8th		
Mentor Toruń Cup		6th		
Nordic Championships	4th	5th		
Tallink Hotels Cup	3rd			

== Detailed results ==
ISU personal best scores in the +5/-5 GOE System
Segment	Type	Score	Event
Total	TSS	200.55	2023 CS Finlandia Trophy
Short program	TSS	70.40	2024 European Championships
Short program	TES	35.20	2024 European Championships
Short program	PCS	37.24	2023 CS Golden Spin of Zagreb
Free skating	TSS	132.59	2023 CS Finlandia Trophy
Free skating	TES	60.32	2023 CS Finlandia Trophy
Free skating	PCS	72.27	2023 CS Finlandia Trophy

=== Senior level ===
Results in the 2020–21 season
Date	Event	SP		FS		Total	
Date	Event	P	Score	P	Score	P	Score
Feb 18–21, 2021	(Estonia) 2021 Tallink Hotels Cup	4	65.69	6	106.31	6	172.00

Results in the 2021–22 season
Date	Event	SP		FS		Total	
Date	Event	P	Score	P	Score	P	Score
Oct 7–10, 2021	(Finland) 2021 CS Finlandia Trophy	26	50.73	21	108.09	22	158.82
Nov 11–14, 2021	2021 CS Cup of Austria	22	58.40	22	110.95	21	169.35
Nov 16–21, 2021	(Estonia) 2021 Tallinn Trophy	7	57.44	4	118.95	6	176.39
Dec 8–11, 2021	(Croatia) 2021 CS Golden Spin of Zagreb	21	60.97	20	124.87	20	185.84
Dec 17–19, 2021	(Finland) 2022 Finnish Championships	2	57.90	1	127.19	2	185.09
Feb 1–6, 2022	(Bulgaria) 2022 Sofia Trophy	6	59.40	6	117.79	6	177.19
Feb 24–27, 2022	(Romania) 2022 Bellu Memorial	10	61.09	8	122.32	8	183.41
Mar 4–6, 2022	(Estonia) 2022 Tallink Hotels Cup	6	56.35	4	118.35	6	174.70

Results in the 2022–23 season
Date	Event	SP		FS		Total	
Date	Event	P	Score	P	Score	P	Score
Sep 21–24, 2022	(Germany) 2022 CS Nebelhorn Trophy	13	60.43	12	115.66	13	176.09
Oct 5–9, 2022	(Finland) 2022 CS Finlandia Trophy	17	62.04	16	115.13	16	177.17
Nov 17–20, 2022	(Poland) 2022 CS Warsaw Cup	21	59.35	21	107.96	21	167.31
Nov 24–27, 2022	(Estonia) 2022 Tallinn Trophy	5	54.26	5	107.89	5	162.15
Dec 16–18, 2022	(Finland) 2023 Finnish Championships	2	63.47	3	112.31	2	175.78
Jan 12–16, 2023	(United States) 2023 Winter World University Games	26	56.70	—N/a	—N/a	26	56.70
Feb 1–5, 2023	(Iceland) 2023 Nordic Championships	4	59.15	3	122.43	3	181.58
Feb 16–19, 2023	(Estonia) 2023 Tallink Hotels Cup	10	56.99	9	120.72	9	177.71

Results in the 2023–24 season
Date	Event	SP		FS		Total	
Date	Event	P	Score	P	Score	P	Score
Sep 8–10, 2023	(Italy) 2023 CS Lombardia Trophy	13	43.42	12	107.97	13	151.39
Oct 4–8, 2023	(Finland) 2023 CS Finlandia Trophy	11	67.96	10	132.59	10	200.55
Oct 27–29, 2023	(Slovakia) 2023 Tirnavia Ice Cup	3	69.93	4	124.94	4	194.87
Nov 17–19, 2023	(Finland) 2023 Grand Prix of Espoo	12	54.44	12	107.56	12	162.00
Dec 6–9, 2023	(Croatia) 2023 CS Golden Spin of Zagreb	6	67.67	7	130.63	7	198.30
Dec 15–17, 2023	(Finland) 2024 Finnish Championships	1	74.09	2	130.03	1	204.12
Jan 8–14, 2024	(Lithuania) 2024 European Championships	18	70.40	20	122.35	20	192.75
Feb 1–4, 2024	(Sweden) 2024 Nordic Championships	3	59.65	2	126.98	3	186.63
Feb 15–18, 2024	(Estonia) 2024 Tallink Hotels Cup	6	66.21	5	138.10	6	204.31

Results in the 2024–25 season
Date	Event	SP		FS		Total	
Date	Event	P	Score	P	Score	P	Score
Sep 12–15, 2024	(Italy) 2024 CS Lombardia Trophy	14	60.12	17	106.38	16	166.50
Oct 11–13, 2024	(Hungary) 2024 CS Budapest Trophy	5	64.79	4	129.83	5	194.62
Nov 15–17, 2024	(Finland) 2024 Finlandia Trophy	11	59.58	10	120.90	10	180.48
Dec 4–7, 2024	(Croatia) 2024 CS Golden Spin of Zagreb	14	61.24	18	93.91	17	155.15
Jan 16–18, 2025	(Italy) 2025 Winter World University Games	19	61.20	16	117.52	16	178.72
Feb 18–20, 2025	(Italy) Road to 26 Trophy	11	60.79	11	121.16	11	181.95

Results in the 2025–26 season
Date	Event	SP		FS		Total	
Date	Event	P	Score	P	Score	P	Score
Sep 11–14, 2025	(Italy) 2025 CS Lombardia Trophy	14	60.39	14	110.77	14	171.16
Nov 5-9, 2025	(Latvia) 2025 Volvo Open Cup	8	53.71	6	112.01	6	165.72
Nov 19–23, 2025	(Poland) 2025 CS Warsaw Cup	16	57.42	15	122.71	14	180.13
Nov 25-30, 2025	(Estonia) 2025 CS Tallinn Trophy	10	65.22	12	122.83	13	188.05
Dec 12-14, 2025	(Finland) 2026 Finnish Championships	3	65.87	2	126.63	2	192.50
Jan 6-11, 2026	(Bulgaria) 2026 Sofia Trophy	4	52.43	3	123.52	4	175.95

Results in the 2026–27 season
Date	Event	SP		FS		Total	
Date	Event	P	Score	P	Score	P	Score
Nov 4–8, 2026	(Latvia) 2026 Volvo Open Cup	110	56.58	7	114.80	7	171.38
Nov 16–22, 2026	(Estonia) 2026 CS Tallinn Trophy	6	67.98	7	127.00	7	194.98

=== Junior level ===
Results in the 2018–19 season
Date	Event	SP		FS		Total	
Date	Event	P	Score	P	Score	P	Score
Dec 14–16, 2018	(Finland) 2019 Finnish Championships (Junior)	4	38.42	3	75.76	4	114.18
Feb 7–10, 2019	(Sweden) 2019 Nordic Championships (Junior)	3	40.30	4	72.15	4	112.45
Feb 22–24, 2019	(Estonia) 2019 Tallink Hotels Cup	3	44.14	2	83.40	3	127.54

Results in the 2019–20 season
Date	Event	SP		FS		Total	
Date	Event	P	Score	P	Score	P	Score
Sep 18–21, 2019	2019 JGP Poland	24	41.26	22	72.90	24	114.16
Oct 17–20, 2019	(Hungary) 2019 Halloween Cup	9	37.71	8	74.54	8	112.25
Dec 13–15, 2019	(Finland) 2020 Finnish Championships (Junior)	1	48.86	3	77.18	2	126.04
Jan 7–12, 2020	(Poland) 2020 Mentor Toruń Cup	5	51.04	5	91.99	6	143.03
Feb 5–9, 2020	(Norway) 2020 Nordic Championships (Junior)	4	50.43	5	82.83	5	133.26

Results in the 2021–22 season
Date	Event	SP		FS		Total	
Date	Event	P	Score	P	Score	P	Score
Aug 18–21, 2021	2021 JGP France I	7	54.85	5	107.73	6	162.58
Sep 1–4, 2021	2021 JGP Slovakia	10	58.17	13	102.79	14	160.96
Apr 13–17, 2022	(Estonia) 2022 World Junior Championships	26	56.26	—N/a	—N/a	26	56.26

Results in the 2022–23 season
Date	Event	SP		FS		Total	
Date	Event	P	Score	P	Score	P	Score
Aug 24–27, 2022	2022 JGP France	10	52.93	11	94.37	11	147.30
Sep 7–10, 2022	2022 JGP Latvia	5	67.11	5	121.92	5	189.03
Feb 27 – Mar 5, 2023	(Canada) 2023 World Junior Championships	29	56.49	—N/a	—N/a	29	56.49
