= Philippine Skating Union =

National skating governing body

- Sport: figure skating, speed skating, short track speed skating
- Abbreviation: PhSU
- Affiliation: International Skating Union
- Affiliation date: 2004
- President: Dyan Leah C. Cheng
- (founded): Ice Skating Institute of the Philippines

Official website
- philippineskating.com
- (Philippines)

The Philippine Skating Union (PhSU) is the sports governing body of the Philippines for figure skating and short track speedskating. PhSU was granted provisional membership on June 13, 2004 by the International Skating Union. Full membership was granted upon the completion of an Olympic sized skating rink at the SM Mall of Asia. It is a National Sports Association duly recognized by the Philippine Sports Commission and the Philippine Olympic Committee. PhSU was originally established as the Ice Skating Institute of the Philippines.

== Tournaments ==
- Philippine Figure Skating Championships
- Philippine Open Short Track Championships
