= 2017–18 ISU World Standings =

Merit-based ice skating ranking

2017–18 ISU World Standings and Season's World Ranking
Season-end No. 1 skaters
- Men's singles: (Japan) Yuzuru Hanyu
- Ladies' singles: (Canada) Kaetlyn Osmond
- Pairs: (Germany) Aljona Savchenko / Bruno Massot
- Ice dance: (Canada) Tessa Virtue / Scott Moir

Season's No. 1 skaters
- Men's singles: (United States) Nathan Chen
- Ladies' singles: (Russia) Alina Zagitova
- Pairs: (Germany) Aljona Savchenko / Bruno Massot
- Ice dance: (France) Gabriella Papadakis / Guillaume Cizeron

Season-end No. 1 teams
- Senior Synchronized: (Russia) Team Paradise
- Junior Synchronized: (Russia) Team Junost Junior

Navigation

The 2017–18 ISU World Standings and Season's World Ranking, are the World Standings and Season's World Ranking published by the International Skating Union (ISU) during the 2017–18 season.

The 2017–18 ISU World Standings for single & pair skating and ice dance, are taking into account results of the 2015–16, 2016–17 and 2017–18 seasons. The 2017–18 ISU World standings for synchronized skating, are based on the results of the 2015–16, 2016–17 and 2017–18 seasons.

== World Standings for single & pair skating and ice dance ==
=== Season-end standings ===
The remainder of this section is a complete list, by discipline, published by the ISU.

==== Men's singles (213 skaters) ====
As of 24 March 2018

Rank	Nation	Skater	Points	Season	ISU Championships or Olympics	(Junior) Grand Prix and Final		Selected International Competition	
Rank	Nation	Skater	Points	Season	Best	Best	2nd Best	Best	2nd Best
1	JPN	Yuzuru Hanyu	5265	2017/2018 season (100%)	1200	360	0	270	0
1	JPN	Yuzuru Hanyu	5265	2016/2017 season (100%)	1200	800	400	300	0
1	JPN	Yuzuru Hanyu	5265	2015/2016 season (70%)	756	560	280	175	0
2	JPN	Shoma Uno	5121	2017/2018 season (100%)	1080	720	400	300	0
2	JPN	Shoma Uno	5121	2016/2017 season (100%)	1080	648	400	300	0
2	JPN	Shoma Uno	5121	2015/2016 season (70%)	447	454	280	139	0
3	USA	Nathan Chen	4920	2017/2018 season (100%)	1200	800	400	300	0
3	USA	Nathan Chen	4920	2016/2017 season (100%)	840	720	360	300	0
3	USA	Nathan Chen	4920	2015/2016 season (70%)	0	245	175	0	0
4	RUS	Mikhail Kolyada	4181	2017/2018 season (100%)	972	648	400	300	219
4	RUS	Mikhail Kolyada	4181	2016/2017 season (100%)	680	292	262	219	0
4	RUS	Mikhail Kolyada	4181	2015/2016 season (70%)	613	183	0	189	175
5	ESP	Javier Fernandez	4034	2017/2018 season (100%)	972	400	236	300	0
5	ESP	Javier Fernandez	4034	2016/2017 season (100%)	875	583	400	0	0
5	ESP	Javier Fernandez	4034	2015/2016 season (70%)	840	504	280	0	0
6	USA	Jason Brown	3787	2017/2018 season (100%)	680	472	360	270	0
6	USA	Jason Brown	3787	2016/2017 season (100%)	638	360	213	300	270
6	USA	Jason Brown	3787	2015/2016 season (70%)	0	227	0	210	189
7	ISR	Alexei Bychenko	3601	2017/2018 season (100%)	875	324	262	270	178
7	ISR	Alexei Bychenko	3601	2016/2017 season (100%)	551	324	292	300	225
7	ISR	Alexei Bychenko	3601	2015/2016 season (70%)	529	0	0	175	112
8	CHN	Boyang Jin	3527	2017/2018 season (100%)	875	360	292	300	0
8	CHN	Boyang Jin	3527	2016/2017 season (100%)	972	360	262	0	0
8	CHN	Boyang Jin	3527	2015/2016 season (70%)	680	368	252	0	0
9	USA	Adam Rippon	3506	2017/2018 season (100%)	465	525	360	243	0
9	USA	Adam Rippon	3506	2016/2017 season (100%)	0	472	324	243	0
9	USA	Adam Rippon	3506	2015/2016 season (70%)	496	204	204	189	189
10	CAN	Patrick Chan	3270	2017/2018 season (100%)	517	292	0	0	0
10	CAN	Patrick Chan	3270	2016/2017 season (100%)	787	525	400	270	0
10	CAN	Patrick Chan	3270	2015/2016 season (70%)	588	408	280	0	0
11	RUS	Dmitri Aliev	3164	2017/2018 season (100%)	756	236	191	300	0
11	RUS	Dmitri Aliev	3164	2016/2017 season (100%)	450	350	250	270	0
11	RUS	Dmitri Aliev	3164	2015/2016 season (70%)	207	221	175	189	142
12	USA	Max Aaron	3077	2017/2018 season (100%)	551	324	213	270	203
12	USA	Max Aaron	3077	2016/2017 season (100%)	0	292	262	243	243
12	USA	Max Aaron	3077	2015/2016 season (70%)	402	280	149	210	189
13	RUS	Alexander Samarin	2893	2017/2018 season (100%)	496	324	292	198	0
13	RUS	Alexander Samarin	2893	2016/2017 season (100%)	405	315	250	250	0
13	RUS	Alexander Samarin	2893	2015/2016 season (70%)	256	175	127	210	153
14	LAT	Deniss Vasiļjevs	2865	2017/2018 season (100%)	709	236	191	250	219
14	LAT	Deniss Vasiļjevs	2865	2016/2017 season (100%)	446	236	0	250	0
14	LAT	Deniss Vasiļjevs	2865	2015/2016 season (70%)	213	158	158	170	139
15	JPN	Keiji Tanaka	2739	2017/2018 season (100%)	612	213	0	250	144
15	JPN	Keiji Tanaka	2739	2016/2017 season (100%)	237	324	213	250	0
15	JPN	Keiji Tanaka	2739	2015/2016 season (70%)	347	183	0	189	158
16	UZB	Misha Ge	2727	2017/2018 season (100%)	517	324	292	219	0
16	UZB	Misha Ge	2727	2016/2017 season (100%)	446	236	213	270	0
16	UZB	Misha Ge	2727	2015/2016 season (70%)	193	134	0	210	0
17	RUS	Sergei Voronov	2639	2017/2018 season (100%)	0	583	400	300	270
17	RUS	Sergei Voronov	2639	2016/2017 season (100%)	0	324	292	300	0
17	RUS	Sergei Voronov	2639	2015/2016 season (70%)	0	183	165	170	142
18	USA	Vincent Zhou	2627	2017/2018 season (100%)	709	292	0	270	0
18	USA	Vincent Zhou	2627	2016/2017 season (100%)	500	225	203	250	0
18	USA	Vincent Zhou	2627	2015/2016 season (70%)	230	178	158	0	0
19	BEL	Jorik Hendrickx	2480	2017/2018 season (100%)	325	262	0	300	225
19	BEL	Jorik Hendrickx	2480	2016/2017 season (100%)	612	236	0	270	250
19	BEL	Jorik Hendrickx	2480	2015/2016 season (70%)	253	0	0	175	175
20	ISR	Daniel Samohin	2387	2017/2018 season (100%)	339	0	0	243	0
20	ISR	Daniel Samohin	2387	2016/2017 season (100%)	295	262	191	270	203
20	ISR	Daniel Samohin	2387	2015/2016 season (70%)	350	161	158	210	189
21	RUS	Maxim Kovtun	2363	2017/2018 season (100%)	0	0	0	0	0
21	RUS	Maxim Kovtun	2363	2016/2017 season (100%)	756	213	213	243	0
21	RUS	Maxim Kovtun	2363	2015/2016 season (70%)	476	252	0	210	0
22	RUS	Alexander Petrov	2293	2017/2018 season (100%)	0	0	0	160	144
22	RUS	Alexander Petrov	2293	2016/2017 season (100%)	365	236	213	300	250
22	RUS	Alexander Petrov	2293	2015/2016 season (70%)	281	165	165	158	0
23	GEO	Morisi Kvitelashvili	2281	2017/2018 season (100%)	264	262	236	300	270
23	GEO	Morisi Kvitelashvili	2281	2016/2017 season (100%)	496	0	0	250	203
23	GEO	Morisi Kvitelashvili	2281	2015/2016 season (70%)	0	0	0	170	139
24	ITA	Matteo Rizzo	2169	2017/2018 season (100%)	405	250	148	300	225
24	ITA	Matteo Rizzo	2169	2016/2017 season (100%)	174	120	0	250	182
24	ITA	Matteo Rizzo	2169	2015/2016 season (70%)	166	115	115	170	158
25	CAN	Nam Nguyen	2141	2017/2018 season (100%)	362	213	0	198	0
25	CAN	Nam Nguyen	2141	2016/2017 season (100%)	402	236	191	198	0
25	CAN	Nam Nguyen	2141	2015/2016 season (70%)	0	183	149	158	0
26	CZE	Michal Brezina	2132	2017/2018 season (100%)	465	236	0	178	0
26	CZE	Michal Brezina	2132	2016/2017 season (100%)	264	292	0	0	0
26	CZE	Michal Brezina	2132	2015/2016 season (70%)	362	149	134	158	158
27	JPN	Takahito Mura	2115	2017/2018 season (100%)	264	213	0	160	0
27	JPN	Takahito Mura	2115	2016/2017 season (100%)	0	262	191	270	0
27	JPN	Takahito Mura	2115	2015/2016 season (70%)	386	227	0	142	0
28	RUS	Roman Savosin	2091	2017/2018 season (100%)	328	225	182	219	0
28	RUS	Roman Savosin	2091	2016/2017 season (100%)	0	255	250	300	243
28	RUS	Roman Savosin	2091	2015/2016 season (70%)	89	0	0	0	0
29	CAN	Kevin Reynolds	2081	2017/2018 season (100%)	446	191	0	0	0
29	CAN	Kevin Reynolds	2081	2016/2017 season (100%)	517	324	0	270	0
29	CAN	Kevin Reynolds	2081	2015/2016 season (70%)	205	0	0	175	158
30	CHN	Han Yan	2064	2017/2018 season (100%)	325	262	262	250	0
30	CHN	Han Yan	2064	2016/2017 season (100%)	325	262	0	0	0
30	CHN	Han Yan	2064	2015/2016 season (70%)	476	227	204	0	0
31	KAZ	Denis Ten	2046	2017/2018 season (100%)	192	191	0	219	164
31	KAZ	Denis Ten	2046	2016/2017 season (100%)	247	360	0	0	0
31	KAZ	Denis Ten	2046	2015/2016 season (70%)	293	204	0	210	158
32	JPN	Kazuki Tomono	2023	2017/2018 season (100%)	787	213	0	225	198
32	JPN	Kazuki Tomono	2023	2016/2017 season (100%)	215	203	182	0	0
32	JPN	Kazuki Tomono	2023	2015/2016 season (70%)	80	0	0	0	0
33	FRA	Chafik Besseghier	1915	2017/2018 season (100%)	293	0	0	203	160
33	FRA	Chafik Besseghier	1915	2016/2017 season (100%)	362	191	191	250	250
33	FRA	Chafik Besseghier	1915	2015/2016 season (70%)	113	0	0	175	175
34	CAN	Keegan Messing	1871	2017/2018 season (100%)	574	262	191	243	0
34	CAN	Keegan Messing	1871	2016/2017 season (100%)	0	0	0	243	219
34	CAN	Keegan Messing	1871	2015/2016 season (70%)	0	0	0	139	0
35	USA	Grant Hochstein	1868	2017/2018 season (100%)	293	0	0	219	0
35	USA	Grant Hochstein	1868	2016/2017 season (100%)	362	0	0	243	198
35	USA	Grant Hochstein	1868	2015/2016 season (70%)	326	204	204	112	0
36	SWE	Alexander Majorov	1789	2017/2018 season (100%)	446	0	0	250	250
36	SWE	Alexander Majorov	1789	2016/2017 season (100%)	293	0	0	300	250
36	SWE	Alexander Majorov	1789	2015/2016 season (70%)	205	0	0	175	158
37	USA	Alexei Krasnozhon	1771	2017/2018 season (100%)	0	350	250	270	182
37	USA	Alexei Krasnozhon	1771	2016/2017 season (100%)	239	250	230	0	0
37	USA	Alexei Krasnozhon	1771	2015/2016 season (70%)	0	142	115	0	0
38	UKR	Ivan Pavlov	1638	2017/2018 season (100%)	239	164	148	160	0
38	UKR	Ivan Pavlov	1638	2016/2017 season (100%)	214	182	133	250	0
38	UKR	Ivan Pavlov	1638	2015/2016 season (70%)	134	142	84	139	0
39	FRA	Kevin Aymoz	1628	2017/2018 season (100%)	0	0	0	250	0
39	FRA	Kevin Aymoz	1628	2016/2017 season (100%)	266	182	148	250	0
39	FRA	Kevin Aymoz	1628	2015/2016 season (70%)	151	127	0	142	112
40	AUS	Brendan Kerry	1567	2017/2018 season (100%)	237	0	0	243	243
40	AUS	Brendan Kerry	1567	2016/2017 season (100%)	293	0	0	219	198
40	AUS	Brendan Kerry	1567	2015/2016 season (70%)	155	134	0	175	142
41	ITA	Ivan Righini	1487	2017/2018 season (100%)	0	0	0	250	219
41	ITA	Ivan Righini	1487	2016/2017 season (100%)	237	0	0	0	0
41	ITA	Ivan Righini	1487	2015/2016 season (70%)	347	134	0	175	125
42	USA	Ross Miner	1486	2017/2018 season (100%)	0	236	0	198	178
42	USA	Ross Miner	1486	2016/2017 season (100%)	0	0	0	178	0
42	USA	Ross Miner	1486	2015/2016 season (70%)	150	227	149	170	0
43	MAS	Julian Zhi Jie Yee	1394	2017/2018 season (100%)	173	0	0	198	178
43	MAS	Julian Zhi Jie Yee	1394	2016/2017 season (100%)	192	0	0	219	203
43	MAS	Julian Zhi Jie Yee	1394	2015/2016 season (70%)	134	127	93	189	0
44	GER	Paul Fentz	1348	2017/2018 season (100%)	275	0	0	160	160
44	GER	Paul Fentz	1348	2016/2017 season (100%)	325	0	0	225	203
44	GER	Paul Fentz	1348	2015/2016 season (70%)	121	0	0	0	0
45	UKR	Yaroslav Paniot	1340	2017/2018 season (100%)	0	0	0	243	225
45	UKR	Yaroslav Paniot	1340	2016/2017 season (100%)	194	164	164	0	0
45	UKR	Yaroslav Paniot	1340	2015/2016 season (70%)	122	127	0	101	0
46	PHI	Michael Christian Martinez	1268	2017/2018 season (100%)	0	0	0	144	0
46	PHI	Michael Christian Martinez	1268	2016/2017 season (100%)	214	0	0	164	0
46	PHI	Michael Christian Martinez	1268	2015/2016 season (70%)	253	165	0	175	153
47	SUI	Stephane Walker	1262	2017/2018 season (100%)	140	0	0	270	203
47	SUI	Stephane Walker	1262	2016/2017 season (100%)	156	0	0	250	243
47	SUI	Stephane Walker	1262	2015/2016 season (70%)	88	0	0	142	142
48	USA	Andrew Torgashev	1260	2017/2018 season (100%)	0	225	207	178	0
48	USA	Andrew Torgashev	1260	2016/2017 season (100%)	0	225	182	243	0
48	USA	Andrew Torgashev	1260	2015/2016 season (70%)	0	0	0	0	0
49	USA	Tomoki Hiwatashi	1246	2017/2018 season (100%)	266	203	203	0	0
49	USA	Tomoki Hiwatashi	1246	2016/2017 season (100%)	0	148	0	0	0
49	USA	Tomoki Hiwatashi	1246	2015/2016 season (70%)	284	142	115	0	0
50	CAN	Liam Firus	1216	2017/2018 season (100%)	0	191	0	243	243
50	CAN	Liam Firus	1216	2016/2017 season (100%)	0	0	0	198	0
50	CAN	Liam Firus	1216	2015/2016 season (70%)	166	0	0	175	112
51	RUS	Alexey Erokhov	1203	2017/2018 season (100%)	500	250	250	0	0
51	RUS	Alexey Erokhov	1203	2016/2017 season (100%)	0	203	0	0	0
51	RUS	Alexey Erokhov	1203	2015/2016 season (70%)	0	0	0	0	0
52	GBR	Graham Newberry	1196	2017/2018 season (100%)	0	0	0	250	225
52	GBR	Graham Newberry	1196	2016/2017 season (100%)	173	120	0	225	203
52	GBR	Graham Newberry	1196	2015/2016 season (70%)	0	0	0	0	0
53	KOR	Jun Hwan Cha	1137	2017/2018 season (100%)	275	0	0	0	0
53	KOR	Jun Hwan Cha	1137	2016/2017 season (100%)	328	284	250	0	0
53	KOR	Jun Hwan Cha	1137	2015/2016 season (70%)	186	0	0	0	0
54	CAN	Nicolas Nadeau	1136	2017/2018 season (100%)	0	213	0	178	0
54	CAN	Nicolas Nadeau	1136	2016/2017 season (100%)	157	0	0	0	0
54	CAN	Nicolas Nadeau	1136	2015/2016 season (70%)	315	158	115	0	0
55	JPN	Mitsuki Sumoto	1116	2017/2018 season (100%)	215	284	250	0	0
55	JPN	Mitsuki Sumoto	1116	2016/2017 season (100%)	0	203	164	0	0
55	JPN	Mitsuki Sumoto	1116	2015/2016 season (70%)	0	93	0	0	0
56	USA	Timothy Dolensky	1106	2017/2018 season (100%)	0	0	0	250	178
56	USA	Timothy Dolensky	1106	2016/2017 season (100%)	0	191	0	178	160
56	USA	Timothy Dolensky	1106	2015/2016 season (70%)	0	149	0	153	153
57	GEO	Irakli Maysuradze	1101	2017/2018 season (100%)	157	182	0	0	0
57	GEO	Irakli Maysuradze	1101	2016/2017 season (100%)	0	148	133	225	225
57	GEO	Irakli Maysuradze	1101	2015/2016 season (70%)	31	0	0	0	0
58	CAN	Joseph Phan	1084	2017/2018 season (100%)	365	225	182	0	0
58	CAN	Joseph Phan	1084	2016/2017 season (100%)	0	164	148	0	0
58	CAN	Joseph Phan	1084	2015/2016 season (70%)	0	0	0	0	0
59	ITA	Maurizio Zandron	1076	2017/2018 season (100%)	0	0	0	250	225
59	ITA	Maurizio Zandron	1076	2016/2017 season (100%)	126	0	0	250	225
59	ITA	Maurizio Zandron	1076	2015/2016 season (70%)	0	0	0	158	158
60	GBR	Phillip Harris	1072	2017/2018 season (100%)	237	0	0	203	0
60	GBR	Phillip Harris	1072	2016/2017 season (100%)	0	0	0	225	182
60	GBR	Phillip Harris	1072	2015/2016 season (70%)	98	0	0	127	125
61	ITA	Daniel Grassl	1047	2017/2018 season (100%)	0	148	133	250	250
61	ITA	Daniel Grassl	1047	2016/2017 season (100%)	0	133	133	0	0
61	ITA	Daniel Grassl	1047	2015/2016 season (70%)	0	0	0	0	0
62	RUS	Makar Ignatov	1041	2017/2018 season (100%)	0	255	225	198	160
62	RUS	Makar Ignatov	1041	2016/2017 season (100%)	0	0	0	203	0
62	RUS	Makar Ignatov	1041	2015/2016 season (70%)	0	0	0	0	0
63	CAN	Elladj Balde	992	2017/2018 season (100%)	402	0	0	0	0
63	CAN	Elladj Balde	992	2016/2017 season (100%)	0	236	0	144	0
63	CAN	Elladj Balde	992	2015/2016 season (70%)	0	0	0	210	0
64	USA	Camden Pulkinen	968	2017/2018 season (100%)	295	315	250	0	0
64	USA	Camden Pulkinen	968	2016/2017 season (100%)	0	108	0	0	0
64	USA	Camden Pulkinen	968	2015/2016 season (70%)	0	0	0	0	0
65	CAN	Roman Sadovsky	962	2017/2018 season (100%)	0	0	0	0	0
65	CAN	Roman Sadovsky	962	2016/2017 season (100%)	93	225	164	160	0
65	CAN	Roman Sadovsky	962	2015/2016 season (70%)	0	175	145	0	0
66	FIN	Valtter Virtanen	959	2017/2018 season (100%)	126	0	0	225	203
66	FIN	Valtter Virtanen	959	2016/2017 season (100%)	83	0	0	164	0
66	FIN	Valtter Virtanen	959	2015/2016 season (70%)	0	0	0	158	142
67	FRA	Romain Ponsart	950	2017/2018 season (100%)	247	0	0	203	182
67	FRA	Romain Ponsart	950	2016/2017 season (100%)	0	0	0	203	0
67	FRA	Romain Ponsart	950	2015/2016 season (70%)	0	0	0	115	0
68	CAN	Conrad Orzel	940	2017/2018 season (100%)	141	203	133	0	0
68	CAN	Conrad Orzel	940	2016/2017 season (100%)	141	225	97	0	0
68	CAN	Conrad Orzel	940	2015/2016 season (70%)	0	0	0	0	0
69	ESP	Javier Raya	932	2017/2018 season (100%)	0	0	0	225	225
69	ESP	Javier Raya	932	2016/2017 season (100%)	140	0	0	182	160
69	ESP	Javier Raya	932	2015/2016 season (70%)	0	0	0	0	0
70	JPN	Daisuke Murakami	920	2017/2018 season (100%)	0	0	0	144	0
70	JPN	Daisuke Murakami	920	2016/2017 season (100%)	0	0	0	219	0
70	JPN	Daisuke Murakami	920	2015/2016 season (70%)	0	330	227	0	0
71	ARM	Slavik Hayrapetyan	911	2017/2018 season (100%)	192	0	0	144	0
71	ARM	Slavik Hayrapetyan	911	2016/2017 season (100%)	102	0	0	203	0
71	ARM	Slavik Hayrapetyan	911	2015/2016 season (70%)	0	0	0	158	112
72	TPE	Chih-I Tsao	875	2017/2018 season (100%)	156	0	0	182	0
72	TPE	Chih-I Tsao	875	2016/2017 season (100%)	126	120	0	164	0
72	TPE	Chih-I Tsao	875	2015/2016 season (70%)	71	0	0	127	0
73	NOR	Sondre Oddvoll Bøe	842	2017/2018 season (100%)	92	0	0	203	0
73	NOR	Sondre Oddvoll Bøe	842	2016/2017 season (100%)	75	120	0	0	0
73	NOR	Sondre Oddvoll Bøe	842	2015/2016 season (70%)	52	68	68	115	101
74	GER	Peter Liebers	829	2017/2018 season (100%)	0	0	0	219	203
74	GER	Peter Liebers	829	2016/2017 season (100%)	0	0	0	225	182
74	GER	Peter Liebers	829	2015/2016 season (70%)	0	0	0	139	0
75	RUS	Anton Shulepov	823	2017/2018 season (100%)	0	0	0	0	0
75	RUS	Anton Shulepov	823	2016/2017 season (100%)	0	0	0	270	225
75	RUS	Anton Shulepov	823	2015/2016 season (70%)	0	0	0	189	139
76	JPN	Koshiro Shimada	809	2017/2018 season (100%)	0	164	133	0	0
76	JPN	Koshiro Shimada	809	2016/2017 season (100%)	127	203	182	0	0
76	JPN	Koshiro Shimada	809	2015/2016 season (70%)	0	115	93	0	0
77	CZE	Jiri Belohradsky	807	2017/2018 season (100%)	0	148	108	0	0
77	CZE	Jiri Belohradsky	807	2016/2017 season (100%)	113	120	97	0	0
77	CZE	Jiri Belohradsky	807	2015/2016 season (70%)	79	0	0	142	0
78	RUS	Artur Dmitriev	806	2017/2018 season (100%)	0	0	0	243	0
78	RUS	Artur Dmitriev	806	2016/2017 season (100%)	0	0	0	178	0
78	RUS	Artur Dmitriev	806	2015/2016 season (70%)	0	0	0	210	175
79	KOR	Jinseo Kim	787	2017/2018 season (100%)	0	0	0	0	0
79	KOR	Jinseo Kim	787	2016/2017 season (100%)	156	0	0	225	178
79	KOR	Jinseo Kim	787	2015/2016 season (70%)	228	0	0	0	0
80	AZE	Larry Loupolover	766	2017/2018 season (100%)	0	97	0	0	0
80	AZE	Larry Loupolover	766	2016/2017 season (100%)	0	0	0	203	182
80	AZE	Larry Loupolover	766	2015/2016 season (70%)	0	0	0	142	142
81	EST	Daniel Albert Naurits	761	2017/2018 season (100%)	102	0	0	182	182
81	EST	Daniel Albert Naurits	761	2016/2017 season (100%)	92	0	0	203	0
81	EST	Daniel Albert Naurits	761	2015/2016 season (70%)	0	0	0	0	0
82	KOR	Sihyeong Lee	756	2017/2018 season (100%)	174	108	97	0	0
82	KOR	Sihyeong Lee	756	2016/2017 season (100%)	173	120	0	0	0
82	KOR	Sihyeong Lee	756	2015/2016 season (70%)	0	84	76	0	0
83	SUI	Lukas Britschgi	750	2017/2018 season (100%)	0	0	0	225	203
83	SUI	Lukas Britschgi	750	2016/2017 season (100%)	0	97	0	225	0
83	SUI	Lukas Britschgi	750	2015/2016 season (70%)	0	0	0	0	0
84	CZE	Petr Kotlarik	743	2017/2018 season (100%)	68	0	0	203	0
84	CZE	Petr Kotlarik	743	2016/2017 season (100%)	49	0	0	164	0
84	CZE	Petr Kotlarik	743	2015/2016 season (70%)	0	76	68	115	0
85	POL	Igor Reznichenko	741	2017/2018 season (100%)	74	0	0	250	198
85	POL	Igor Reznichenko	741	2016/2017 season (100%)	0	0	0	219	0
85	POL	Igor Reznichenko	741	2015/2016 season (70%)	0	0	0	0	0
86	RUS	Adian Pitkeev	740	2017/2018 season (100%)	0	0	0	0	0
86	RUS	Adian Pitkeev	740	2016/2017 season (100%)	0	0	0	0	0
86	RUS	Adian Pitkeev	740	2015/2016 season (70%)	0	252	165	170	153
87	USA	Alexander Johnson	739	2017/2018 season (100%)	0	0	0	270	164
87	USA	Alexander Johnson	739	2016/2017 season (100%)	0	0	0	178	0
87	USA	Alexander Johnson	739	2015/2016 season (70%)	0	0	0	127	125
88	KOR	June Hyoung Lee	734	2017/2018 season (100%)	214	0	0	198	0
88	KOR	June Hyoung Lee	734	2016/2017 season (100%)	140	0	0	182	0
88	KOR	June Hyoung Lee	734	2015/2016 season (70%)	121	0	0	0	0
89	RUS	Konstantin Menshov	733	2017/2018 season (100%)	0	0	0	0	0
89	RUS	Konstantin Menshov	733	2016/2017 season (100%)	0	0	0	0	0
89	RUS	Konstantin Menshov	733	2015/2016 season (70%)	0	183	165	210	175
90	ITA	Alessandro Fadini	729	2017/2018 season (100%)	0	0	0	225	0
90	ITA	Alessandro Fadini	729	2016/2017 season (100%)	0	0	0	225	164
90	ITA	Alessandro Fadini	729	2015/2016 season (70%)	0	0	0	115	0
91	ESP	Felipe Montoya	727	2017/2018 season (100%)	113	0	0	0	0
91	ESP	Felipe Montoya	727	2016/2017 season (100%)	0	0	0	203	0
91	ESP	Felipe Montoya	727	2015/2016 season (70%)	109	0	0	175	127
92	KAZ	Abzal Rakimgaliev	714	2017/2018 season (100%)	83	0	0	164	0
92	KAZ	Abzal Rakimgaliev	714	2016/2017 season (100%)	0	0	0	182	160
92	KAZ	Abzal Rakimgaliev	714	2015/2016 season (70%)	0	0	0	125	0
93	JPN	Ryuju Hino	713	2017/2018 season (100%)	0	0	0	225	164
93	JPN	Ryuju Hino	713	2016/2017 season (100%)	0	0	0	182	0
93	JPN	Ryuju Hino	713	2015/2016 season (70%)	0	0	0	142	125
94	ITA	Dario Betti	672	2017/2018 season (100%)	0	0	0	0	0
94	ITA	Dario Betti	672	2016/2017 season (100%)	0	0	0	203	203
94	ITA	Dario Betti	672	2015/2016 season (70%)	0	0	0	139	127
95	FRA	Adrien Tesson	631	2017/2018 season (100%)	0	0	0	250	203
95	FRA	Adrien Tesson	631	2016/2017 season (100%)	0	0	0	178	0
95	FRA	Adrien Tesson	631	2015/2016 season (70%)	0	0	0	0	0
96	SUI	Nicola Todeschini	627	2017/2018 season (100%)	0	0	0	164	0
96	SUI	Nicola Todeschini	627	2016/2017 season (100%)	0	0	0	182	0
96	SUI	Nicola Todeschini	627	2015/2016 season (70%)	39	0	0	127	115
97	RUS	Andrei Lazukin	623	2017/2018 season (100%)	0	0	0	178	144
97	RUS	Andrei Lazukin	623	2016/2017 season (100%)	0	0	0	225	0
97	RUS	Andrei Lazukin	623	2015/2016 season (70%)	0	76	0	0	0
98	FRA	Luc Economides	618	2017/2018 season (100%)	114	225	182	0	0
98	FRA	Luc Economides	618	2016/2017 season (100%)	0	97	0	0	0
98	FRA	Luc Economides	618	2015/2016 season (70%)	0	0	0	0	0
99	RUS	Igor Efimchuk	592	2017/2018 season (100%)	0	203	164	0	0
99	RUS	Igor Efimchuk	592	2016/2017 season (100%)	0	0	0	225	0
99	RUS	Igor Efimchuk	592	2015/2016 season (70%)	0	0	0	0	0
100	RUS	Artur Danielian	583	2017/2018 season (100%)	450	133	0	0	0
100	RUS	Artur Danielian	583	2016/2017 season (100%)	0	0	0	0	0
100	RUS	Artur Danielian	583	2015/2016 season (70%)	0	0	0	0	0
101	RUS	Petr Gumennik	577	2017/2018 season (100%)	0	0	0	0	0
101	RUS	Petr Gumennik	577	2016/2017 season (100%)	0	182	164	0	0
101	RUS	Petr Gumennik	577	2015/2016 season (70%)	0	127	104	0	0
102	TUR	Başar Oktar	555	2017/2018 season (100%)	0	182	148	225	0
102	TUR	Başar Oktar	555	2016/2017 season (100%)	0	0	0	0	0
102	TUR	Başar Oktar	555	2015/2016 season (70%)	0	0	0	0	0
103	JPN	Hiroaki Sato	549	2017/2018 season (100%)	0	0	0	182	0
103	JPN	Hiroaki Sato	549	2016/2017 season (100%)	0	0	0	225	0
103	JPN	Hiroaki Sato	549	2015/2016 season (70%)	0	0	0	142	0
104	ISR	Mark Gorodnitsky	540	2017/2018 season (100%)	127	164	97	0	0
104	ISR	Mark Gorodnitsky	540	2016/2017 season (100%)	55	97	0	0	0
104	ISR	Mark Gorodnitsky	540	2015/2016 season (70%)	0	0	0	0	0
105	JPN	Sota Yamamoto	538	2017/2018 season (100%)	0	0	0	164	0
105	JPN	Sota Yamamoto	538	2016/2017 season (100%)	0	0	0	0	0
105	JPN	Sota Yamamoto	538	2015/2016 season (70%)	0	199	175	0	0
106	CHN	He Zhang	531	2017/2018 season (100%)	126	0	0	0	0
106	CHN	He Zhang	531	2016/2017 season (100%)	0	0	0	0	0
106	CHN	He Zhang	531	2015/2016 season (70%)	136	142	127	0	0
107	RUS	Gordei Gorshkov	521	2017/2018 season (100%)	0	0	0	0	0
107	RUS	Gordei Gorshkov	521	2016/2017 season (100%)	0	0	0	198	0
107	RUS	Gordei Gorshkov	521	2015/2016 season (70%)	0	0	0	170	153
108	ITA	Marco Zandron	504	2017/2018 season (100%)	0	0	0	0	0
108	ITA	Marco Zandron	504	2016/2017 season (100%)	0	0	0	250	0
108	ITA	Marco Zandron	504	2015/2016 season (70%)	0	0	0	127	127
109	FRA	Adam Siao Him Fa	473	2017/2018 season (100%)	93	108	108	164	0
109	FRA	Adam Siao Him Fa	473	2016/2017 season (100%)	0	0	0	0	0
109	FRA	Adam Siao Him Fa	473	2015/2016 season (70%)	0	0	0	0	0
110	TUR	Burak Demirboga	468	2017/2018 season (100%)	83	0	0	203	182
110	TUR	Burak Demirboga	468	2016/2017 season (100%)	0	0	0	0	0
110	TUR	Burak Demirboga	468	2015/2016 season (70%)	0	0	0	0	0
111	CRO	Nicholas Vrdoljak	463	2017/2018 season (100%)	0	0	0	0	0
111	CRO	Nicholas Vrdoljak	463	2016/2017 season (100%)	0	0	0	164	144
111	CRO	Nicholas Vrdoljak	463	2015/2016 season (70%)	71	84	0	0	0
112	ITA	Adrien Bannister	461	2017/2018 season (100%)	0	0	0	182	0
112	ITA	Adrien Bannister	461	2016/2017 season (100%)	0	0	0	164	0
112	ITA	Adrien Bannister	461	2015/2016 season (70%)	0	0	0	115	0
112	GER	Franz Streubel	461	2017/2018 season (100%)	0	0	0	0	0
112	GER	Franz Streubel	461	2016/2017 season (100%)	0	0	0	0	0
112	GER	Franz Streubel	461	2015/2016 season (70%)	150	0	0	158	153
112	ITA	Alberto Vanz	461	2017/2018 season (100%)	0	0	0	0	0
112	ITA	Alberto Vanz	461	2016/2017 season (100%)	0	0	0	182	164
112	ITA	Alberto Vanz	461	2015/2016 season (70%)	0	0	0	115	0
115	CZE	Matyas Belohradsky	459	2017/2018 season (100%)	0	148	0	0	0
115	CZE	Matyas Belohradsky	459	2016/2017 season (100%)	0	203	108	0	0
115	CZE	Matyas Belohradsky	459	2015/2016 season (70%)	0	0	0	0	0
116	RUS	Ilia Skirda	450	2017/2018 season (100%)	0	0	0	0	0
116	RUS	Ilia Skirda	450	2016/2017 season (100%)	0	225	225	0	0
116	RUS	Ilia Skirda	450	2015/2016 season (70%)	0	0	0	0	0
117	USA	Sean Rabbitt	446	2017/2018 season (100%)	0	0	0	144	0
117	USA	Sean Rabbitt	446	2016/2017 season (100%)	0	0	0	160	0
117	USA	Sean Rabbitt	446	2015/2016 season (70%)	0	0	0	142	0
118	AUS	Mark Webster	428	2017/2018 season (100%)	0	0	0	182	144
118	AUS	Mark Webster	428	2016/2017 season (100%)	102	0	0	0	0
118	AUS	Mark Webster	428	2015/2016 season (70%)	0	0	0	0	0
119	POL	Krzysztof Gala	421	2017/2018 season (100%)	0	0	0	182	0
119	POL	Krzysztof Gala	421	2016/2017 season (100%)	0	0	0	0	0
119	POL	Krzysztof Gala	421	2015/2016 season (70%)	0	0	0	127	112
120	GBR	Harry Mattick	414	2017/2018 season (100%)	0	0	0	0	0
120	GBR	Harry Mattick	414	2016/2017 season (100%)	0	0	0	250	164
120	GBR	Harry Mattick	414	2015/2016 season (70%)	0	0	0	0	0
121	KOR	Geon Hyeong An	413	2017/2018 season (100%)	113	97	0	203	0
121	KOR	Geon Hyeong An	413	2016/2017 season (100%)	0	0	0	0	0
121	KOR	Geon Hyeong An	413	2015/2016 season (70%)	0	0	0	0	0
122	USA	Richard Dornbush	408	2017/2018 season (100%)	0	0	0	0	0
122	USA	Richard Dornbush	408	2016/2017 season (100%)	0	0	0	0	0
122	USA	Richard Dornbush	408	2015/2016 season (70%)	0	149	134	125	0
123	JPN	Yuto Kishina	405	2017/2018 season (100%)	0	164	133	0	0
123	JPN	Yuto Kishina	405	2016/2017 season (100%)	0	108	0	0	0
123	JPN	Yuto Kishina	405	2015/2016 season (70%)	0	0	0	0	0
124	EST	Aleksandr Selevko	404	2017/2018 season (100%)	0	0	0	0	0
124	EST	Aleksandr Selevko	404	2016/2017 season (100%)	0	148	0	203	0
124	EST	Aleksandr Selevko	404	2015/2016 season (70%)	53	0	0	0	0
125	GBR	Peter James Hallam	383	2017/2018 season (100%)	0	0	0	225	0
125	GBR	Peter James Hallam	383	2016/2017 season (100%)	0	0	0	0	0
125	GBR	Peter James Hallam	383	2015/2016 season (70%)	0	0	0	158	0
126	MEX	Donovan Carrillo	381	2017/2018 season (100%)	140	133	0	0	0
126	MEX	Donovan Carrillo	381	2016/2017 season (100%)	0	108	0	0	0
126	MEX	Donovan Carrillo	381	2015/2016 season (70%)	0	0	0	0	0
126	JPN	Shu Nakamura	381	2017/2018 season (100%)	0	0	0	0	0
126	JPN	Shu Nakamura	381	2016/2017 season (100%)	0	0	0	203	0
126	JPN	Shu Nakamura	381	2015/2016 season (70%)	110	68	0	0	0
128	HUN	Alexander Maszljanko	364	2017/2018 season (100%)	0	0	0	182	182
128	HUN	Alexander Maszljanko	364	2016/2017 season (100%)	0	0	0	0	0
128	HUN	Alexander Maszljanko	364	2015/2016 season (70%)	0	0	0	0	0
129	RUS	Artem Lezheev	356	2017/2018 season (100%)	0	0	0	0	0
129	RUS	Artem Lezheev	356	2016/2017 season (100%)	0	0	0	203	0
129	RUS	Artem Lezheev	356	2015/2016 season (70%)	0	0	0	153	0
130	SUI	Nurullah Sahaka	353	2017/2018 season (100%)	103	0	0	250	0
130	SUI	Nurullah Sahaka	353	2016/2017 season (100%)	0	0	0	0	0
130	SUI	Nurullah Sahaka	353	2015/2016 season (70%)	0	0	0	0	0
131	CHN	Tangxu Li	352	2017/2018 season (100%)	0	0	0	0	0
131	CHN	Tangxu Li	352	2016/2017 season (100%)	61	164	0	0	0
131	CHN	Tangxu Li	352	2015/2016 season (70%)	0	127	0	0	0
132	USA	Jordan Moeller	337	2017/2018 season (100%)	0	0	0	0	0
132	USA	Jordan Moeller	337	2016/2017 season (100%)	0	0	0	225	0
132	USA	Jordan Moeller	337	2015/2016 season (70%)	0	0	0	112	0
133	ARG	Denis Margalik	335	2017/2018 season (100%)	0	0	0	0	0
133	ARG	Denis Margalik	335	2016/2017 season (100%)	0	0	0	0	0
133	ARG	Denis Margalik	335	2015/2016 season (70%)	109	142	84	0	0
134	FIN	Roman Galay	334	2017/2018 season (100%)	0	0	0	0	0
134	FIN	Roman Galay	334	2016/2017 season (100%)	0	0	0	0	0
134	FIN	Roman Galay	334	2015/2016 season (70%)	0	104	0	115	115
135	RUS	Vladimir Samoilov	329	2017/2018 season (100%)	0	225	0	0	0
135	RUS	Vladimir Samoilov	329	2016/2017 season (100%)	0	0	0	0	0
135	RUS	Vladimir Samoilov	329	2015/2016 season (70%)	0	104	0	0	0
136	ITA	Mattia Dalla Torre	328	2017/2018 season (100%)	0	0	0	164	0
136	ITA	Mattia Dalla Torre	328	2016/2017 season (100%)	0	0	0	164	0
136	ITA	Mattia Dalla Torre	328	2015/2016 season (70%)	0	0	0	0	0
136	JPN	Tatsuya Tsuboi	328	2017/2018 season (100%)	0	164	164	0	0
136	JPN	Tatsuya Tsuboi	328	2016/2017 season (100%)	0	0	0	0	0
136	JPN	Tatsuya Tsuboi	328	2015/2016 season (70%)	0	0	0	0	0
138	CAN	Bennet Toman	325	2017/2018 season (100%)	0	0	0	0	0
138	CAN	Bennet Toman	325	2016/2017 season (100%)	0	0	0	198	0
138	CAN	Bennet Toman	325	2015/2016 season (70%)	0	0	0	127	0
139	RUS	Egor Murashov	323	2017/2018 season (100%)	0	203	120	0	0
139	RUS	Egor Murashov	323	2016/2017 season (100%)	0	0	0	0	0
139	RUS	Egor Murashov	323	2015/2016 season (70%)	0	0	0	0	0
140	ITA	Jari Kessler	318	2017/2018 season (100%)	0	0	0	203	0
140	ITA	Jari Kessler	318	2016/2017 season (100%)	0	0	0	0	0
140	ITA	Jari Kessler	318	2015/2016 season (70%)	0	0	0	115	0
141	AUS	Andrew Dodds	316	2017/2018 season (100%)	102	0	0	0	0
141	AUS	Andrew Dodds	316	2016/2017 season (100%)	113	0	0	0	0
141	AUS	Andrew Dodds	316	2015/2016 season (70%)	79	0	0	101	0
142	EST	Samuel Koppel	308	2017/2018 season (100%)	0	0	0	0	0
142	EST	Samuel Koppel	308	2016/2017 season (100%)	0	0	0	164	144
142	EST	Samuel Koppel	308	2015/2016 season (70%)	0	0	0	0	0
143	GER	Thomas Stoll	305	2017/2018 season (100%)	0	0	0	164	0
143	GER	Thomas Stoll	305	2016/2017 season (100%)	44	97	0	0	0
143	GER	Thomas Stoll	305	2015/2016 season (70%)	0	0	0	0	0
144	FIN	Matthias Versluis	302	2017/2018 season (100%)	0	0	0	0	0
144	FIN	Matthias Versluis	302	2016/2017 season (100%)	0	0	0	0	0
144	FIN	Matthias Versluis	302	2015/2016 season (70%)	0	0	0	175	127
145	RUS	Artem Kovalev	296	2017/2018 season (100%)	0	0	0	0	0
145	RUS	Artem Kovalev	296	2016/2017 season (100%)	0	148	148	0	0
145	RUS	Artem Kovalev	296	2015/2016 season (70%)	0	0	0	0	0
146	JPN	Sena Miyake	287	2017/2018 season (100%)	83	120	0	0	0
146	JPN	Sena Miyake	287	2016/2017 season (100%)	0	0	0	0	0
146	JPN	Sena Miyake	287	2015/2016 season (70%)	0	84	0	0	0
147	FRA	Maxence Collet	279	2017/2018 season (100%)	0	97	0	182	0
147	FRA	Maxence Collet	279	2016/2017 season (100%)	0	0	0	0	0
147	FRA	Maxence Collet	279	2015/2016 season (70%)	0	0	0	0	0
148	JPN	Daichi Miyata	266	2017/2018 season (100%)	0	0	0	0	0
148	JPN	Daichi Miyata	266	2016/2017 season (100%)	0	0	0	0	0
148	JPN	Daichi Miyata	266	2015/2016 season (70%)	58	104	104	0	0
149	GBR	Charlie Parry-Evans	257	2017/2018 season (100%)	0	0	0	0	0
149	GBR	Charlie Parry-Evans	257	2016/2017 season (100%)	0	0	0	0	0
149	GBR	Charlie Parry-Evans	257	2015/2016 season (70%)	0	0	0	142	115
150	USA	Eric Sjoberg	253	2017/2018 season (100%)	0	120	0	0	0
150	USA	Eric Sjoberg	253	2016/2017 season (100%)	0	133	0	0	0
150	USA	Eric Sjoberg	253	2015/2016 season (70%)	0	0	0	0	0
151	BLR	Pavel Ignatenko	250	2017/2018 season (100%)	0	0	0	0	0
151	BLR	Pavel Ignatenko	250	2016/2017 season (100%)	0	0	0	0	0
151	BLR	Pavel Ignatenko	250	2015/2016 season (70%)	0	0	0	125	125
151	RUS	Konstantin Miliukov	250	2017/2018 season (100%)	0	0	0	250	0
151	RUS	Konstantin Miliukov	250	2016/2017 season (100%)	0	0	0	0	0
151	RUS	Konstantin Miliukov	250	2015/2016 season (70%)	0	0	0	0	0
153	CHN	Yan Hao	240	2017/2018 season (100%)	0	120	120	0	0
153	CHN	Yan Hao	240	2016/2017 season (100%)	0	0	0	0	0
153	CHN	Yan Hao	240	2015/2016 season (70%)	0	0	0	0	0
154	SWE	Illya Solomin	232	2017/2018 season (100%)	0	0	0	164	0
154	SWE	Illya Solomin	232	2016/2017 season (100%)	0	0	0	0	0
154	SWE	Illya Solomin	232	2015/2016 season (70%)	0	68	0	0	0
155	NED	Thomas Kennes	225	2017/2018 season (100%)	0	0	0	225	0
155	NED	Thomas Kennes	225	2016/2017 season (100%)	0	0	0	0	0
155	NED	Thomas Kennes	225	2015/2016 season (70%)	0	0	0	0	0
156	RUS	Daniil Bernadiner	219	2017/2018 season (100%)	0	0	0	0	0
156	RUS	Daniil Bernadiner	219	2016/2017 season (100%)	0	0	0	0	0
156	RUS	Daniil Bernadiner	219	2015/2016 season (70%)	0	115	104	0	0
156	RUS	Pavel Vyugov	219	2017/2018 season (100%)	0	0	0	0	0
156	RUS	Pavel Vyugov	219	2016/2017 season (100%)	0	0	0	219	0
156	RUS	Pavel Vyugov	219	2015/2016 season (70%)	0	0	0	0	0
158	USA	Kevin Shum	209	2017/2018 season (100%)	0	0	0	0	0
158	USA	Kevin Shum	209	2016/2017 season (100%)	0	133	0	0	0
158	USA	Kevin Shum	209	2015/2016 season (70%)	0	76	0	0	0
159	SLO	David Kranjec	206	2017/2018 season (100%)	0	0	0	0	0
159	SLO	David Kranjec	206	2016/2017 season (100%)	0	0	0	0	0
159	SLO	David Kranjec	206	2015/2016 season (70%)	64	0	0	142	0
160	HUN	Alexander Borovoj	203	2017/2018 season (100%)	0	0	0	203	0
160	HUN	Alexander Borovoj	203	2016/2017 season (100%)	0	0	0	0	0
160	HUN	Alexander Borovoj	203	2015/2016 season (70%)	0	0	0	0	0
160	RUS	Egor Rukhin	203	2017/2018 season (100%)	0	203	0	0	0
160	RUS	Egor Rukhin	203	2016/2017 season (100%)	0	0	0	0	0
160	RUS	Egor Rukhin	203	2015/2016 season (70%)	0	0	0	0	0
160	FRA	Philip Warren	203	2017/2018 season (100%)	0	0	0	203	0
160	FRA	Philip Warren	203	2016/2017 season (100%)	0	0	0	0	0
160	FRA	Philip Warren	203	2015/2016 season (70%)	0	0	0	0	0
163	USA	Oleksiy Melnyk	201	2017/2018 season (100%)	0	0	0	0	0
163	USA	Oleksiy Melnyk	201	2016/2017 season (100%)	0	108	0	0	0
163	USA	Oleksiy Melnyk	201	2015/2016 season (70%)	0	93	0	0	0
164	USA	Tony Lu	197	2017/2018 season (100%)	0	0	0	0	0
164	USA	Tony Lu	197	2016/2017 season (100%)	0	0	0	0	0
164	USA	Tony Lu	197	2015/2016 season (70%)	0	104	93	0	0
165	GER	Jonathan Hess	194	2017/2018 season (100%)	194	0	0	0	0
165	GER	Jonathan Hess	194	2016/2017 season (100%)	0	0	0	0	0
165	GER	Jonathan Hess	194	2015/2016 season (70%)	0	0	0	0	0
166	MAS	Kai Xiang Chew	191	2017/2018 season (100%)	0	108	0	0	0
166	MAS	Kai Xiang Chew	191	2016/2017 season (100%)	83	0	0	0	0
166	MAS	Kai Xiang Chew	191	2015/2016 season (70%)	0	0	0	0	0
167	CZE	Tomas Kupka	182	2017/2018 season (100%)	0	0	0	0	0
167	CZE	Tomas Kupka	182	2016/2017 season (100%)	0	0	0	182	0
167	CZE	Tomas Kupka	182	2015/2016 season (70%)	0	0	0	0	0
167	RUS	Murad Kurbanov	182	2017/2018 season (100%)	0	0	0	0	0
167	RUS	Murad Kurbanov	182	2016/2017 season (100%)	0	0	0	182	0
167	RUS	Murad Kurbanov	182	2015/2016 season (70%)	0	0	0	0	0
167	JPN	Jun Suzuki	182	2017/2018 season (100%)	0	0	0	182	0
167	JPN	Jun Suzuki	182	2016/2017 season (100%)	0	0	0	0	0
167	JPN	Jun Suzuki	182	2015/2016 season (70%)	0	0	0	0	0
170	SWE	Gabriel Folkesson	175	2017/2018 season (100%)	55	120	0	0	0
170	SWE	Gabriel Folkesson	175	2016/2017 season (100%)	0	0	0	0	0
170	SWE	Gabriel Folkesson	175	2015/2016 season (70%)	0	0	0	0	0
171	KOR	Se Jong Byun	174	2017/2018 season (100%)	0	0	0	0	0
171	KOR	Se Jong Byun	174	2016/2017 season (100%)	0	0	0	0	0
171	KOR	Se Jong Byun	174	2015/2016 season (70%)	98	76	0	0	0
172	RUS	Zhan Bush	170	2017/2018 season (100%)	0	0	0	0	0
172	RUS	Zhan Bush	170	2016/2017 season (100%)	0	0	0	0	0
172	RUS	Zhan Bush	170	2015/2016 season (70%)	0	0	0	170	0
173	HKG	Leslie Man Cheuk Ip	166	2017/2018 season (100%)	74	0	0	0	0
173	HKG	Leslie Man Cheuk Ip	166	2016/2017 season (100%)	92	0	0	0	0
173	HKG	Leslie Man Cheuk Ip	166	2015/2016 season (70%)	64	0	0	0	0
174	TUR	Engin Ali Artan	164	2017/2018 season (100%)	0	0	0	164	0
174	TUR	Engin Ali Artan	164	2016/2017 season (100%)	0	0	0	0	0
174	TUR	Engin Ali Artan	164	2015/2016 season (70%)	0	0	0	0	0
174	POL	Lukasz Kedzierski	164	2017/2018 season (100%)	0	0	0	164	0
174	POL	Lukasz Kedzierski	164	2016/2017 season (100%)	0	0	0	0	0
174	POL	Lukasz Kedzierski	164	2015/2016 season (70%)	0	0	0	0	0
174	SVK	Marco Klepoch	164	2017/2018 season (100%)	0	0	0	164	0
174	SVK	Marco Klepoch	164	2016/2017 season (100%)	0	0	0	0	0
174	SVK	Marco Klepoch	164	2015/2016 season (70%)	0	0	0	0	0
174	FRA	Landry Le May	164	2017/2018 season (100%)	0	0	0	164	0
174	FRA	Landry Le May	164	2016/2017 season (100%)	0	0	0	0	0
174	FRA	Landry Le May	164	2015/2016 season (70%)	0	0	0	0	0
174	MON	Davide Lewton Brain	164	2017/2018 season (100%)	0	0	0	0	0
174	MON	Davide Lewton Brain	164	2016/2017 season (100%)	0	0	0	164	0
174	MON	Davide Lewton Brain	164	2015/2016 season (70%)	0	0	0	0	0
174	AUT	Luc Maierhofer	164	2017/2018 season (100%)	0	0	0	164	0
174	AUT	Luc Maierhofer	164	2016/2017 season (100%)	0	0	0	0	0
174	AUT	Luc Maierhofer	164	2015/2016 season (70%)	0	0	0	0	0
174	SVK	Michael Neuman	164	2017/2018 season (100%)	0	0	0	164	0
174	SVK	Michael Neuman	164	2016/2017 season (100%)	0	0	0	0	0
174	SVK	Michael Neuman	164	2015/2016 season (70%)	0	0	0	0	0
174	HKG	Harrison Jon-Yen Wong	164	2017/2018 season (100%)	0	0	0	164	0
174	HKG	Harrison Jon-Yen Wong	164	2016/2017 season (100%)	0	0	0	0	0
174	HKG	Harrison Jon-Yen Wong	164	2015/2016 season (70%)	0	0	0	0	0
182	GER	Niko Ulanovsky	152	2017/2018 season (100%)	0	0	0	0	0
182	GER	Niko Ulanovsky	152	2016/2017 season (100%)	0	0	0	0	0
182	GER	Niko Ulanovsky	152	2015/2016 season (70%)	0	84	68	0	0
183	BLR	Yakau Zenko	149	2017/2018 season (100%)	0	0	0	0	0
183	BLR	Yakau Zenko	149	2016/2017 season (100%)	0	0	0	0	0
183	BLR	Yakau Zenko	149	2015/2016 season (70%)	65	84	0	0	0
184	RUS	Evgeni Semenenko	148	2017/2018 season (100%)	0	148	0	0	0
184	RUS	Evgeni Semenenko	148	2016/2017 season (100%)	0	0	0	0	0
184	RUS	Evgeni Semenenko	148	2015/2016 season (70%)	0	0	0	0	0
185	GER	Alexander Bjelde	142	2017/2018 season (100%)	0	0	0	0	0
185	GER	Alexander Bjelde	142	2016/2017 season (100%)	0	0	0	0	0
185	GER	Alexander Bjelde	142	2015/2016 season (70%)	0	0	0	142	0
185	GER	Martin Rappe	142	2017/2018 season (100%)	0	0	0	0	0
185	GER	Martin Rappe	142	2016/2017 season (100%)	0	0	0	0	0
185	GER	Martin Rappe	142	2015/2016 season (70%)	0	0	0	142	0
187	CHN	Yi Wang	134	2017/2018 season (100%)	0	0	0	0	0
187	CHN	Yi Wang	134	2016/2017 season (100%)	0	0	0	0	0
187	CHN	Yi Wang	134	2015/2016 season (70%)	0	134	0	0	0
188	CHN	Shuai Fang	133	2017/2018 season (100%)	0	133	0	0	0
188	CHN	Shuai Fang	133	2016/2017 season (100%)	0	0	0	0	0
188	CHN	Shuai Fang	133	2015/2016 season (70%)	0	0	0	0	0
188	PRK	Kum Chol Han	133	2017/2018 season (100%)	0	0	0	0	0
188	PRK	Kum Chol Han	133	2016/2017 season (100%)	0	133	0	0	0
188	PRK	Kum Chol Han	133	2015/2016 season (70%)	0	0	0	0	0
190	SUI	Vincent Cuerel	127	2017/2018 season (100%)	0	0	0	0	0
190	SUI	Vincent Cuerel	127	2016/2017 season (100%)	0	0	0	0	0
190	SUI	Vincent Cuerel	127	2015/2016 season (70%)	0	0	0	127	0
190	FIN	Tomi Pulkkinen	127	2017/2018 season (100%)	0	0	0	0	0
190	FIN	Tomi Pulkkinen	127	2016/2017 season (100%)	0	0	0	0	0
190	FIN	Tomi Pulkkinen	127	2015/2016 season (70%)	0	0	0	127	0
192	CHN	Yuheng Li	120	2017/2018 season (100%)	0	0	0	0	0
192	CHN	Yuheng Li	120	2016/2017 season (100%)	0	120	0	0	0
192	CHN	Yuheng Li	120	2015/2016 season (70%)	0	0	0	0	0
192	USA	Maxim Naumov	120	2017/2018 season (100%)	0	120	0	0	0
192	USA	Maxim Naumov	120	2016/2017 season (100%)	0	0	0	0	0
192	USA	Maxim Naumov	120	2015/2016 season (70%)	0	0	0	0	0
194	TPE	Meng Ju Lee	115	2017/2018 season (100%)	0	0	0	0	0
194	TPE	Meng Ju Lee	115	2016/2017 season (100%)	0	0	0	0	0
194	TPE	Meng Ju Lee	115	2015/2016 season (70%)	0	0	0	115	0
195	CAN	Edrian Paul Celestino	108	2017/2018 season (100%)	0	0	0	0	0
195	CAN	Edrian Paul Celestino	108	2016/2017 season (100%)	0	108	0	0	0
195	CAN	Edrian Paul Celestino	108	2015/2016 season (70%)	0	0	0	0	0
195	USA	Ryan Dunk	108	2017/2018 season (100%)	0	108	0	0	0
195	USA	Ryan Dunk	108	2016/2017 season (100%)	0	0	0	0	0
195	USA	Ryan Dunk	108	2015/2016 season (70%)	0	0	0	0	0
195	USA	William Hubbart	108	2017/2018 season (100%)	0	0	0	0	0
195	USA	William Hubbart	108	2016/2017 season (100%)	0	108	0	0	0
195	USA	William Hubbart	108	2015/2016 season (70%)	0	0	0	0	0
195	AUS	James Min	108	2017/2018 season (100%)	0	108	0	0	0
195	AUS	James Min	108	2016/2017 season (100%)	0	0	0	0	0
195	AUS	James Min	108	2015/2016 season (70%)	0	0	0	0	0
199	CAN	Christophe Belley-Lemelin	101	2017/2018 season (100%)	0	0	0	0	0
199	CAN	Christophe Belley-Lemelin	101	2016/2017 season (100%)	0	0	0	0	0
199	CAN	Christophe Belley-Lemelin	101	2015/2016 season (70%)	0	0	0	101	0
199	KAZ	Artur Panikhin	101	2017/2018 season (100%)	0	0	0	0	0
199	KAZ	Artur Panikhin	101	2016/2017 season (100%)	0	0	0	0	0
199	KAZ	Artur Panikhin	101	2015/2016 season (70%)	0	0	0	101	0
201	ITA	Nik Folini	97	2017/2018 season (100%)	0	97	0	0	0
201	ITA	Nik Folini	97	2016/2017 season (100%)	0	0	0	0	0
201	ITA	Nik Folini	97	2015/2016 season (70%)	0	0	0	0	0
201	SWE	Nikolaj Majorov	97	2017/2018 season (100%)	0	0	0	0	0
201	SWE	Nikolaj Majorov	97	2016/2017 season (100%)	0	97	0	0	0
201	SWE	Nikolaj Majorov	97	2015/2016 season (70%)	0	0	0	0	0
201	JPN	Taichiro Yamakuma	97	2017/2018 season (100%)	0	97	0	0	0
201	JPN	Taichiro Yamakuma	97	2016/2017 season (100%)	0	0	0	0	0
201	JPN	Taichiro Yamakuma	97	2015/2016 season (70%)	0	0	0	0	0
204	ESP	Aleix Gabara	93	2017/2018 season (100%)	0	0	0	0	0
204	ESP	Aleix Gabara	93	2016/2017 season (100%)	0	0	0	0	0
204	ESP	Aleix Gabara	93	2015/2016 season (70%)	0	93	0	0	0
204	JPN	Hidetsugu Kamata	93	2017/2018 season (100%)	0	0	0	0	0
204	JPN	Hidetsugu Kamata	93	2016/2017 season (100%)	0	0	0	0	0
204	JPN	Hidetsugu Kamata	93	2015/2016 season (70%)	0	93	0	0	0
206	CHN	Yunda Lu	76	2017/2018 season (100%)	0	0	0	0	0
206	CHN	Yunda Lu	76	2016/2017 season (100%)	0	0	0	0	0
206	CHN	Yunda Lu	76	2015/2016 season (70%)	0	76	0	0	0
206	RUS	Vladislav Tarasenko	76	2017/2018 season (100%)	0	0	0	0	0
206	RUS	Vladislav Tarasenko	76	2016/2017 season (100%)	0	0	0	0	0
206	RUS	Vladislav Tarasenko	76	2015/2016 season (70%)	0	76	0	0	0
208	KOR	Younghyun Cha	75	2017/2018 season (100%)	75	0	0	0	0
208	KOR	Younghyun Cha	75	2016/2017 season (100%)	0	0	0	0	0
208	KOR	Younghyun Cha	75	2015/2016 season (70%)	0	0	0	0	0
209	TPE	Micah Tang	74	2017/2018 season (100%)	0	0	0	0	0
209	TPE	Micah Tang	74	2016/2017 season (100%)	74	0	0	0	0
209	TPE	Micah Tang	74	2015/2016 season (70%)	0	0	0	0	0
210	USA	Anthony Boucher	68	2017/2018 season (100%)	0	0	0	0	0
210	USA	Anthony Boucher	68	2016/2017 season (100%)	0	0	0	0	0
210	USA	Anthony Boucher	68	2015/2016 season (70%)	0	68	0	0	0
211	HKG	Harry Hau Yin Lee	58	2017/2018 season (100%)	0	0	0	0	0
211	HKG	Harry Hau Yin Lee	58	2016/2017 season (100%)	0	0	0	0	0
211	HKG	Harry Hau Yin Lee	58	2015/2016 season (70%)	58	0	0	0	0
212	THA	Micah Kai Lynette	49	2017/2018 season (100%)	49	0	0	0	0
212	THA	Micah Kai Lynette	49	2016/2017 season (100%)	0	0	0	0	0
212	THA	Micah Kai Lynette	49	2015/2016 season (70%)	0	0	0	0	0
213	GBR	Josh Brown	34	2017/2018 season (100%)	0	0	0	0	0
213	GBR	Josh Brown	34	2016/2017 season (100%)	0	0	0	0	0
213	GBR	Josh Brown	34	2015/2016 season (70%)	34	0	0	0	0

==== Ladies' singles (263 skaters) ====
As of 23 March 2018

Rank	Nation	Skater	Points	Season	ISU Championships or Olympics	(Junior) Grand Prix and Final		Selected International Competition	
Rank	Nation	Skater	Points	Season	Best	Best	2nd Best	Best	2nd Best
1	CAN	Kaetlyn Osmond	5081	2017/2018 season (100%)	1200	648	400	300	0
1	CAN	Kaetlyn Osmond	5081	2016/2017 season (100%)	1080	583	360	300	0
1	CAN	Kaetlyn Osmond	5081	2015/2016 season (70%)	347	165	0	210	0
2	RUS	Evgenia Medvedeva	4950	2017/2018 season (100%)	1080	400	400	300	0
2	RUS	Evgenia Medvedeva	4950	2016/2017 season (100%)	1200	800	400	0	0
2	RUS	Evgenia Medvedeva	4950	2015/2016 season (70%)	840	560	280	210	0
3	JPN	Satoko Miyahara	4219	2017/2018 season (100%)	972	525	400	0	0
3	JPN	Satoko Miyahara	4219	2016/2017 season (100%)	0	720	360	300	0
3	JPN	Satoko Miyahara	4219	2015/2016 season (70%)	588	504	280	210	0
4	RUS	Maria Sotskova	3999	2017/2018 season (100%)	612	720	360	300	0
4	RUS	Maria Sotskova	3999	2016/2017 season (100%)	612	525	360	300	0
4	RUS	Maria Sotskova	3999	2015/2016 season (70%)	315	221	175	210	0
5	RUS	Alina Zagitova	3800	2017/2018 season (100%)	1200	800	400	300	0
5	RUS	Alina Zagitova	3800	2016/2017 season (100%)	500	350	250	0	0
5	RUS	Alina Zagitova	3800	2015/2016 season (70%)	0	0	0	0	0
6	JPN	Wakaba Higuchi	3766	2017/2018 season (100%)	1080	472	360	270	250
6	JPN	Wakaba Higuchi	3766	2016/2017 season (100%)	418	324	292	300	0
6	JPN	Wakaba Higuchi	3766	2015/2016 season (70%)	284	158	115	0	0
7	JPN	Mai Mihara	3616	2017/2018 season (100%)	756	292	292	270	250
7	JPN	Mai Mihara	3616	2016/2017 season (100%)	840	324	292	300	0
7	JPN	Mai Mihara	3616	2015/2016 season (70%)	0	158	158	0	0
8	ITA	Carolina Kostner	3590	2017/2018 season (100%)	875	583	360	270	243
8	ITA	Carolina Kostner	3590	2016/2017 season (100%)	709	0	0	300	250
8	ITA	Carolina Kostner	3590	2015/2016 season (70%)	0	0	0	0	0
9	RUS	Anna Pogorilaya	3330	2017/2018 season (100%)	0	0	0	0	0
9	RUS	Anna Pogorilaya	3330	2016/2017 season (100%)	756	648	400	243	0
9	RUS	Anna Pogorilaya	3330	2015/2016 season (70%)	680	204	0	210	189
10	CAN	Gabrielle Daleman	3240	2017/2018 season (100%)	638	236	236	178	0
10	CAN	Gabrielle Daleman	3240	2016/2017 season (100%)	972	292	292	243	0
10	CAN	Gabrielle Daleman	3240	2015/2016 season (70%)	362	183	165	153	0
11	USA	Mirai Nagasu	2969	2017/2018 season (100%)	465	292	0	270	0
11	USA	Mirai Nagasu	2969	2016/2017 season (100%)	680	262	0	300	243
11	USA	Mirai Nagasu	2969	2015/2016 season (70%)	529	183	0	210	139
12	USA	Karen Chen	2962	2017/2018 season (100%)	418	213	191	243	0
12	USA	Karen Chen	2962	2016/2017 season (100%)	875	236	213	243	160
12	USA	Karen Chen	2962	2015/2016 season (70%)	185	183	183	170	153
13	JPN	Kaori Sakamoto	2876	2017/2018 season (100%)	840	360	262	250	225
13	JPN	Kaori Sakamoto	2876	2016/2017 season (100%)	405	284	250	0	0
13	JPN	Kaori Sakamoto	2876	2015/2016 season (70%)	0	158	127	0	0
14	KAZ	Elizabet Tursynbaeva	2829	2017/2018 season (100%)	418	262	191	300	243
14	KAZ	Elizabet Tursynbaeva	2829	2016/2017 season (100%)	517	262	191	243	160
14	KAZ	Elizabet Tursynbaeva	2829	2015/2016 season (70%)	264	204	149	189	189
15	USA	Ashley Wagner	2806	2017/2018 season (100%)	0	324	0	0	0
15	USA	Ashley Wagner	2806	2016/2017 season (100%)	638	400	236	0	0
15	USA	Ashley Wagner	2806	2015/2016 season (70%)	756	408	280	0	0
16	JPN	Rika Hongo	2751	2017/2018 season (100%)	0	236	213	270	225
16	JPN	Rika Hongo	2751	2016/2017 season (100%)	325	262	236	250	219
16	JPN	Rika Hongo	2751	2015/2016 season (70%)	476	252	183	210	0
17	USA	Mariah Bell	2613	2017/2018 season (100%)	551	236	0	198	0
17	USA	Mariah Bell	2613	2016/2017 season (100%)	496	360	0	270	243
17	USA	Mariah Bell	2613	2015/2016 season (70%)	0	134	0	125	0
18	KOR	Dabin Choi	2450	2017/2018 season (100%)	638	0	0	219	0
18	KOR	Dabin Choi	2450	2016/2017 season (100%)	551	213	0	225	219
18	KOR	Dabin Choi	2450	2015/2016 season (70%)	281	142	142	101	0
19	RUS	Elena Radionova	2422	2017/2018 season (100%)	0	324	292	243	0
19	RUS	Elena Radionova	2422	2016/2017 season (100%)	0	472	400	0	0
19	RUS	Elena Radionova	2422	2015/2016 season (70%)	529	454	280	0	0
20	JPN	Marin Honda	2277	2017/2018 season (100%)	0	262	262	300	203
20	JPN	Marin Honda	2277	2016/2017 season (100%)	450	225	225	0	0
20	JPN	Marin Honda	2277	2015/2016 season (70%)	350	199	175	0	0
21	SVK	Nicole Rajičová	2182	2017/2018 season (100%)	496	0	0	182	160
21	SVK	Nicole Rajičová	2182	2016/2017 season (100%)	496	213	0	198	0
21	SVK	Nicole Rajičová	2182	2015/2016 season (70%)	237	149	149	139	0
22	RUS	Stanislava Konstantinova	2170	2017/2018 season (100%)	365	203	0	300	300
22	RUS	Stanislava Konstantinova	2170	2016/2017 season (100%)	295	225	182	300	0
22	RUS	Stanislava Konstantinova	2170	2015/2016 season (70%)	0	0	0	0	0
23	FRA	Laurine Lecavelier	2140	2017/2018 season (100%)	305	191	0	182	0
23	FRA	Laurine Lecavelier	2140	2016/2017 season (100%)	551	236	0	250	250
23	FRA	Laurine Lecavelier	2140	2015/2016 season (70%)	228	0	0	175	158
24	RUS	Elizaveta Tuktamysheva	2107	2017/2018 season (100%)	0	213	0	243	243
24	RUS	Elizaveta Tuktamysheva	2107	2016/2017 season (100%)	0	324	292	270	270
24	RUS	Elizaveta Tuktamysheva	2107	2015/2016 season (70%)	0	252	183	210	210
25	ITA	Roberta Rodeghiero	2028	2017/2018 season (100%)	0	0	0	0	0
25	ITA	Roberta Rodeghiero	2028	2016/2017 season (100%)	362	191	0	219	144
25	ITA	Roberta Rodeghiero	2028	2015/2016 season (70%)	386	227	149	175	175
26	USA	Bradie Tennell	2011	2017/2018 season (100%)	709	324	0	250	219
26	USA	Bradie Tennell	2011	2016/2017 season (100%)	266	0	0	243	0
26	USA	Bradie Tennell	2011	2015/2016 season (70%)	122	0	0	0	0
27	USA	Gracie Gold	1892	2017/2018 season (100%)	0	0	0	0	0
27	USA	Gracie Gold	1892	2016/2017 season (100%)	0	262	191	178	0
27	USA	Gracie Gold	1892	2015/2016 season (70%)	613	368	280	0	0
28	GER	Nicole Schott	1889	2017/2018 season (100%)	339	213	0	243	219
28	GER	Nicole Schott	1889	2016/2017 season (100%)	325	0	0	300	250
28	GER	Nicole Schott	1889	2015/2016 season (70%)	0	0	0	153	127
29	KOR	Soyoun Park	1878	2017/2018 season (100%)	293	0	0	0	0
29	KOR	Soyoun Park	1878	2016/2017 season (100%)	0	262	191	219	198
29	KOR	Soyoun Park	1878	2015/2016 season (70%)	428	134	0	153	0
30	JPN	Yuna Shiraiwa	1846	2017/2018 season (100%)	0	236	191	225	203
30	JPN	Yuna Shiraiwa	1846	2016/2017 season (100%)	328	225	182	0	0
30	JPN	Yuna Shiraiwa	1846	2015/2016 season (70%)	256	175	175	0	0
31	USA	Courtney Hicks	1843	2017/2018 season (100%)	0	292	0	243	219
31	USA	Courtney Hicks	1843	2016/2017 season (100%)	0	324	0	178	0
31	USA	Courtney Hicks	1843	2015/2016 season (70%)	0	252	165	170	0
32	BEL	Loena Hendrickx	1805	2017/2018 season (100%)	551	108	0	225	0
32	BEL	Loena Hendrickx	1805	2016/2017 season (100%)	446	0	0	250	225
32	BEL	Loena Hendrickx	1805	2015/2016 season (70%)	0	0	0	0	0
33	FRA	Maé-Bérénice Méité	1772	2017/2018 season (100%)	402	191	0	144	0
33	FRA	Maé-Bérénice Méité	1772	2016/2017 season (100%)	173	213	0	250	225
33	FRA	Maé-Bérénice Méité	1772	2015/2016 season (70%)	347	0	0	0	0
34	CAN	Alaine Chartrand	1743	2017/2018 season (100%)	402	0	0	198	0
34	CAN	Alaine Chartrand	1743	2016/2017 season (100%)	293	262	0	270	0
34	CAN	Alaine Chartrand	1743	2015/2016 season (70%)	205	165	0	153	0
35	HUN	Ivett Tóth	1710	2017/2018 season (100%)	237	0	0	250	0
35	HUN	Ivett Tóth	1710	2016/2017 season (100%)	402	0	0	250	225
35	HUN	Ivett Tóth	1710	2015/2016 season (70%)	205	104	84	158	158
36	FIN	Emmi Peltonen	1679	2017/2018 season (100%)	362	0	0	250	182
36	FIN	Emmi Peltonen	1679	2016/2017 season (100%)	293	164	0	250	178
36	FIN	Emmi Peltonen	1679	2015/2016 season (70%)	0	0	0	0	0
37	SWE	Anita Östlund	1598	2017/2018 season (100%)	156	133	108	225	198
37	SWE	Anita Östlund	1598	2016/2017 season (100%)	141	133	0	225	203
37	SWE	Anita Östlund	1598	2015/2016 season (70%)	0	76	0	0	0
38	RUS	Serafima Sakhanovich	1597	2017/2018 season (100%)	0	262	0	300	270
38	RUS	Serafima Sakhanovich	1597	2016/2017 season (100%)	0	213	0	270	178
38	RUS	Serafima Sakhanovich	1597	2015/2016 season (70%)	0	93	0	189	153
39	LAT	Angelina Kuchvalska	1547	2017/2018 season (100%)	0	0	0	0	0
39	LAT	Angelina Kuchvalska	1547	2016/2017 season (100%)	131	0	0	250	225
39	LAT	Angelina Kuchvalska	1547	2015/2016 season (70%)	428	149	0	189	175
40	RUS	Alena Leonova	1545	2017/2018 season (100%)	0	236	213	198	198
40	RUS	Alena Leonova	1545	2016/2017 season (100%)	0	0	0	243	182
40	RUS	Alena Leonova	1545	2015/2016 season (70%)	0	134	134	189	175
41	GER	Lea Johanna Dastich	1504	2017/2018 season (100%)	194	148	120	178	160
41	GER	Lea Johanna Dastich	1504	2016/2017 season (100%)	239	120	0	203	0
41	GER	Lea Johanna Dastich	1504	2015/2016 season (70%)	110	0	0	142	0
42	FIN	Viveca Lindfors	1487	2017/2018 season (100%)	247	97	0	250	225
42	FIN	Viveca Lindfors	1487	2016/2017 season (100%)	127	0	0	0	0
42	FIN	Viveca Lindfors	1487	2015/2016 season (70%)	281	76	0	158	153
43	KOR	Eunsoo Lim	1485	2017/2018 season (100%)	328	225	182	0	0
43	KOR	Eunsoo Lim	1485	2016/2017 season (100%)	365	203	182	0	0
43	KOR	Eunsoo Lim	1485	2015/2016 season (70%)	0	0	0	0	0
44	AUS	Kailani Craine	1477	2017/2018 season (100%)	222	0	0	300	225
44	AUS	Kailani Craine	1477	2016/2017 season (100%)	173	0	0	270	203
44	AUS	Kailani Craine	1477	2015/2016 season (70%)	166	84	0	115	112
45	SWE	Matilda Algotsson	1430	2017/2018 season (100%)	0	0	0	270	203
45	SWE	Matilda Algotsson	1430	2016/2017 season (100%)	237	97	0	182	182
45	SWE	Matilda Algotsson	1430	2015/2016 season (70%)	166	93	0	175	115
46	CHN	Zijun Li	1371	2017/2018 season (100%)	0	0	0	0	0
46	CHN	Zijun Li	1371	2016/2017 season (100%)	446	292	191	0	0
46	CHN	Zijun Li	1371	2015/2016 season (70%)	293	149	0	0	0
47	GER	Nathalie Weinzierl	1365	2017/2018 season (100%)	0	0	0	250	219
47	GER	Nathalie Weinzierl	1365	2016/2017 season (100%)	156	0	0	225	203
47	GER	Nathalie Weinzierl	1365	2015/2016 season (70%)	312	0	0	125	115
48	USA	Angela Wang	1360	2017/2018 season (100%)	362	0	0	225	219
48	USA	Angela Wang	1360	2016/2017 season (100%)	0	0	0	250	0
48	USA	Angela Wang	1360	2015/2016 season (70%)	0	134	0	170	142
49	KOR	Hanul Kim	1322	2017/2018 season (100%)	496	0	0	203	160
49	KOR	Hanul Kim	1322	2016/2017 season (100%)	0	164	148	0	0
49	KOR	Hanul Kim	1322	2015/2016 season (70%)	151	0	0	0	0
50	RUS	Polina Tsurskaya	1310	2017/2018 season (100%)	0	324	292	0	0
50	RUS	Polina Tsurskaya	1310	2016/2017 season (100%)	194	250	250	0	0
50	RUS	Polina Tsurskaya	1310	2015/2016 season (70%)	0	245	175	0	0
51	JPN	Yura Matsuda	1264	2017/2018 season (100%)	0	0	0	225	198
51	JPN	Yura Matsuda	1264	2016/2017 season (100%)	0	236	213	250	0
51	JPN	Yura Matsuda	1264	2015/2016 season (70%)	0	142	0	0	0
52	CHN	Xiangning Li	1254	2017/2018 season (100%)	325	191	0	225	0
52	CHN	Xiangning Li	1254	2016/2017 season (100%)	305	0	0	0	0
52	CHN	Xiangning Li	1254	2015/2016 season (70%)	48	104	104	0	0
53	ITA	Giada Russo	1251	2017/2018 season (100%)	126	0	0	250	250
53	ITA	Giada Russo	1251	2016/2017 season (100%)	0	0	0	250	225
53	ITA	Giada Russo	1251	2015/2016 season (70%)	150	0	0	175	158
54	JPN	Rin Nitaya	1240	2017/2018 season (100%)	0	0	0	250	178
54	JPN	Rin Nitaya	1240	2016/2017 season (100%)	0	203	182	0	0
54	JPN	Rin Nitaya	1240	2015/2016 season (70%)	0	142	127	158	0
55	JPN	Mako Yamashita	1239	2017/2018 season (100%)	405	225	203	0	0
55	JPN	Mako Yamashita	1239	2016/2017 season (100%)	0	203	203	0	0
55	JPN	Mako Yamashita	1239	2015/2016 season (70%)	0	0	0	0	0
56	JPN	Rika Kihira	1224	2017/2018 season (100%)	239	255	225	0	0
56	JPN	Rika Kihira	1224	2016/2017 season (100%)	0	255	250	0	0
56	JPN	Rika Kihira	1224	2015/2016 season (70%)	0	0	0	0	0
57	RUS	Alisa Fedichkina	1206	2017/2018 season (100%)	0	182	0	270	270
57	RUS	Alisa Fedichkina	1206	2016/2017 season (100%)	0	148	0	0	0
57	RUS	Alisa Fedichkina	1206	2015/2016 season (70%)	0	178	158	0	0
58	SWE	Joshi Helgesson	1181	2017/2018 season (100%)	0	0	0	0	0
58	SWE	Joshi Helgesson	1181	2016/2017 season (100%)	214	0	0	182	182
58	SWE	Joshi Helgesson	1181	2015/2016 season (70%)	253	0	0	175	175
59	CZE	Eliška Březinová	1154	2017/2018 season (100%)	264	0	0	250	225
59	CZE	Eliška Březinová	1154	2016/2017 season (100%)	0	0	0	182	164
59	CZE	Eliška Březinová	1154	2015/2016 season (70%)	58	0	0	175	0
60	ARM	Anastasia Galustyan	1149	2017/2018 season (100%)	0	0	0	144	0
60	ARM	Anastasia Galustyan	1149	2016/2017 season (100%)	264	0	0	203	0
60	ARM	Anastasia Galustyan	1149	2015/2016 season (70%)	134	76	0	170	158
61	AUS	Brooklee Han	1123	2017/2018 season (100%)	214	0	0	160	160
61	AUS	Brooklee Han	1123	2016/2017 season (100%)	214	0	0	250	0
61	AUS	Brooklee Han	1123	2015/2016 season (70%)	109	0	0	125	112
62	ITA	Micol Cristini	1120	2017/2018 season (100%)	192	0	0	250	250
62	ITA	Micol Cristini	1120	2016/2017 season (100%)	0	0	0	225	203
62	ITA	Micol Cristini	1120	2015/2016 season (70%)	0	0	0	158	0
63	RUS	Alexandra Trusova	1100	2017/2018 season (100%)	500	350	250	0	0
63	RUS	Alexandra Trusova	1100	2016/2017 season (100%)	0	0	0	0	0
63	RUS	Alexandra Trusova	1100	2015/2016 season (70%)	0	0	0	0	0
64	SUI	Alexia Paganini	1087	2017/2018 season (100%)	446	0	0	250	243
64	SUI	Alexia Paganini	1087	2016/2017 season (100%)	0	148	0	0	0
64	SUI	Alexia Paganini	1087	2015/2016 season (70%)	0	0	0	0	0
65	KOR	Nahyun Kim	1080	2017/2018 season (100%)	0	0	0	0	0
65	KOR	Nahyun Kim	1080	2016/2017 season (100%)	0	191	0	270	178
65	KOR	Nahyun Kim	1080	2015/2016 season (70%)	253	104	84	0	0
66	GBR	Natasha McKay	1068	2017/2018 season (100%)	0	0	0	225	203
66	GBR	Natasha McKay	1068	2016/2017 season (100%)	140	0	0	250	250
66	GBR	Natasha McKay	1068	2015/2016 season (70%)	0	0	0	0	0
67	RUS	Yulia Lipnitskaya	1051	2017/2018 season (100%)	0	0	0	0	0
67	RUS	Yulia Lipnitskaya	1051	2016/2017 season (100%)	0	0	0	270	0
67	RUS	Yulia Lipnitskaya	1051	2015/2016 season (70%)	0	252	165	189	175
68	ITA	Elisabetta Leccardi	1018	2017/2018 season (100%)	146	97	97	250	225
68	ITA	Elisabetta Leccardi	1018	2016/2017 season (100%)	83	120	0	0	0
68	ITA	Elisabetta Leccardi	1018	2015/2016 season (70%)	0	0	0	0	0
69	RUS	Alena Kostornaia	1015	2017/2018 season (100%)	450	315	250	0	0
69	RUS	Alena Kostornaia	1015	2016/2017 season (100%)	0	0	0	0	0
69	RUS	Alena Kostornaia	1015	2015/2016 season (70%)	0	0	0	0	0
70	SLO	Dasa Grm	1012	2017/2018 season (100%)	131	0	0	250	225
70	SLO	Dasa Grm	1012	2016/2017 season (100%)	0	0	0	203	203
70	SLO	Dasa Grm	1012	2015/2016 season (70%)	0	0	0	142	125
71	JPN	Kanako Murakami	1010	2017/2018 season (100%)	0	0	0	0	0
71	JPN	Kanako Murakami	1010	2016/2017 season (100%)	0	0	0	178	0
71	JPN	Kanako Murakami	1010	2015/2016 season (70%)	312	204	204	112	0
72	BRA	Isadora Williams	1004	2017/2018 season (100%)	106	0	0	225	198
72	BRA	Isadora Williams	1004	2016/2017 season (100%)	0	0	0	250	225
72	BRA	Isadora Williams	1004	2015/2016 season (70%)	0	0	0	158	158
73	AUT	Kerstin Frank	989	2017/2018 season (100%)	0	0	0	225	225
73	AUT	Kerstin Frank	989	2016/2017 season (100%)	92	0	0	225	0
73	AUT	Kerstin Frank	989	2015/2016 season (70%)	64	0	0	158	142
74	UKR	Anna Khnychenkova	986	2017/2018 season (100%)	83	0	0	203	178
74	UKR	Anna Khnychenkova	986	2016/2017 season (100%)	102	0	0	250	0
74	UKR	Anna Khnychenkova	986	2015/2016 season (70%)	126	0	0	127	0
75	CZE	Michaela Lucie Hanzlikova	979	2017/2018 season (100%)	0	0	0	0	0
75	CZE	Michaela Lucie Hanzlikova	979	2016/2017 season (100%)	113	133	108	182	164
75	CZE	Michaela Lucie Hanzlikova	979	2015/2016 season (70%)	0	84	68	127	0
76	GBR	Kristen Spours	971	2017/2018 season (100%)	61	0	0	182	164
76	GBR	Kristen Spours	971	2016/2017 season (100%)	114	0	0	225	225
76	GBR	Kristen Spours	971	2015/2016 season (70%)	0	0	0	0	0
77	NOR	Anne Line Gjersem	950	2017/2018 season (100%)	140	0	0	203	0
77	NOR	Anne Line Gjersem	950	2016/2017 season (100%)	74	0	0	164	164
77	NOR	Anne Line Gjersem	950	2015/2016 season (70%)	109	0	0	170	101
78	USA	Starr Andrews	945	2017/2018 season (100%)	446	164	0	178	0
78	USA	Starr Andrews	945	2016/2017 season (100%)	157	0	0	0	0
78	USA	Starr Andrews	945	2015/2016 season (70%)	0	0	0	0	0
79	LAT	Diana Nikitina	859	2017/2018 season (100%)	0	0	0	250	225
79	LAT	Diana Nikitina	859	2016/2017 season (100%)	0	133	0	0	0
79	LAT	Diana Nikitina	859	2015/2016 season (70%)	136	115	0	0	0
80	HUN	Fruzsina Medgyesi	854	2017/2018 season (100%)	0	0	0	160	0
80	HUN	Fruzsina Medgyesi	854	2016/2017 season (100%)	0	120	120	164	0
80	HUN	Fruzsina Medgyesi	854	2015/2016 season (70%)	0	0	0	175	115
81	USA	Amber Glenn	840	2017/2018 season (100%)	0	0	0	164	144
81	USA	Amber Glenn	840	2016/2017 season (100%)	0	0	0	219	198
81	USA	Amber Glenn	840	2015/2016 season (70%)	0	115	0	0	0
82	TPE	Amy Lin	821	2017/2018 season (100%)	140	0	0	0	0
82	TPE	Amy Lin	821	2016/2017 season (100%)	156	0	0	203	0
82	TPE	Amy Lin	821	2015/2016 season (70%)	134	68	0	142	112
83	AUT	Natalie Klotz	817	2017/2018 season (100%)	0	0	0	203	182
83	AUT	Natalie Klotz	817	2016/2017 season (100%)	0	0	0	250	182
83	AUT	Natalie Klotz	817	2015/2016 season (70%)	0	0	0	115	0
84	SGP	Chloe Ing	809	2017/2018 season (100%)	126	0	0	203	203
84	SGP	Chloe Ing	809	2016/2017 season (100%)	113	0	0	164	0
84	SGP	Chloe Ing	809	2015/2016 season (70%)	0	0	0	0	0
85	GER	Lutricia Bock	790	2017/2018 season (100%)	0	0	0	0	0
85	GER	Lutricia Bock	790	2016/2017 season (100%)	0	133	0	164	160
85	GER	Lutricia Bock	790	2015/2016 season (70%)	0	0	0	175	158
86	RUS	Anastasiia Gubanova	747	2017/2018 season (100%)	0	182	0	0	0
86	RUS	Anastasiia Gubanova	747	2016/2017 season (100%)	0	315	250	0	0
86	RUS	Anastasiia Gubanova	747	2015/2016 season (70%)	0	0	0	0	0
87	RUS	Alexandra Avstriyskaya	745	2017/2018 season (100%)	0	0	0	160	144
87	RUS	Alexandra Avstriyskaya	745	2016/2017 season (100%)	0	0	0	243	198
87	RUS	Alexandra Avstriyskaya	745	2015/2016 season (70%)	0	0	0	0	0
88	KOR	So Hyun An	692	2017/2018 season (100%)	0	0	0	243	182
88	KOR	So Hyun An	692	2016/2017 season (100%)	68	0	0	0	0
88	KOR	So Hyun An	692	2015/2016 season (70%)	0	115	84	0	0
89	RUS	Sofia Samodurova	682	2017/2018 season (100%)	0	250	250	0	0
89	RUS	Sofia Samodurova	682	2016/2017 season (100%)	0	182	0	0	0
89	RUS	Sofia Samodurova	682	2015/2016 season (70%)	0	0	0	0	0
90	KOR	Ye Lim Kim	676	2017/2018 season (100%)	0	182	148	0	0
90	KOR	Ye Lim Kim	676	2016/2017 season (100%)	0	182	164	0	0
90	KOR	Ye Lim Kim	676	2015/2016 season (70%)	0	0	0	0	0
91	SRB	Antonina Dubinina	674	2017/2018 season (100%)	0	0	0	164	164
91	SRB	Antonina Dubinina	674	2016/2017 season (100%)	0	0	0	182	164
91	SRB	Antonina Dubinina	674	2015/2016 season (70%)	0	0	0	0	0
92	JPN	Yuka Nagai	661	2017/2018 season (100%)	0	0	0	0	0
92	JPN	Yuka Nagai	661	2016/2017 season (100%)	0	0	0	0	0
92	JPN	Yuka Nagai	661	2015/2016 season (70%)	0	227	134	175	125
93	SWE	Isabelle Olsson	654	2017/2018 season (100%)	0	0	0	0	0
93	SWE	Isabelle Olsson	654	2016/2017 season (100%)	0	0	0	250	0
93	SWE	Isabelle Olsson	654	2015/2016 season (70%)	52	0	0	210	142
94	USA	Emmy Ma	640	2017/2018 season (100%)	75	203	164	198	0
94	USA	Emmy Ma	640	2016/2017 season (100%)	0	0	0	0	0
94	USA	Emmy Ma	640	2015/2016 season (70%)	0	0	0	0	0
95	KAZ	Aiza Mambekova	634	2017/2018 season (100%)	113	0	0	203	0
95	KAZ	Aiza Mambekova	634	2016/2017 season (100%)	0	120	97	0	0
95	KAZ	Aiza Mambekova	634	2015/2016 season (70%)	0	0	0	101	0
96	USA	Caroline Zhang	622	2017/2018 season (100%)	0	0	0	219	178
96	USA	Caroline Zhang	622	2016/2017 season (100%)	0	0	0	225	0
96	USA	Caroline Zhang	622	2015/2016 season (70%)	0	0	0	0	0
97	FIN	Jenni Saarinen	618	2017/2018 season (100%)	0	0	0	182	0
97	FIN	Jenni Saarinen	618	2016/2017 season (100%)	0	0	0	182	0
97	FIN	Jenni Saarinen	618	2015/2016 season (70%)	0	0	0	127	127
98	ITA	Ilaria Nogaro	613	2017/2018 season (100%)	0	0	0	0	0
98	ITA	Ilaria Nogaro	613	2016/2017 season (100%)	0	0	0	164	164
98	ITA	Ilaria Nogaro	613	2015/2016 season (70%)	0	0	0	158	127
99	KOR	Suh Hyun Son	563	2017/2018 season (100%)	0	0	0	164	0
99	KOR	Suh Hyun Son	563	2016/2017 season (100%)	126	0	0	0	0
99	KOR	Suh Hyun Son	563	2015/2016 season (70%)	34	0	0	127	112
100	KOR	Young You	561	2017/2018 season (100%)	215	182	164	0	0
100	KOR	Young You	561	2016/2017 season (100%)	0	0	0	0	0
100	KOR	Young You	561	2015/2016 season (70%)	0	0	0	0	0
101	EST	Gerli Liinamäe	547	2017/2018 season (100%)	0	0	0	250	0
101	EST	Gerli Liinamäe	547	2016/2017 season (100%)	0	0	0	182	0
101	EST	Gerli Liinamäe	547	2015/2016 season (70%)	0	0	0	115	0
101	USA	Tyler Pierce	547	2017/2018 season (100%)	0	0	0	0	0
101	USA	Tyler Pierce	547	2016/2017 season (100%)	0	0	0	0	0
101	USA	Tyler Pierce	547	2015/2016 season (70%)	207	0	0	170	170
103	RUS	Adelina Sotnikova	541	2017/2018 season (100%)	0	0	0	0	0
103	RUS	Adelina Sotnikova	541	2016/2017 season (100%)	0	0	0	0	0
103	RUS	Adelina Sotnikova	541	2015/2016 season (70%)	0	227	0	189	125
104	EST	Helery Hälvin	534	2017/2018 season (100%)	0	0	0	0	0
104	EST	Helery Hälvin	534	2016/2017 season (100%)	192	0	0	0	0
104	EST	Helery Hälvin	534	2015/2016 season (70%)	88	0	0	127	127
104	RUS	Anastasia Tarakanova	534	2017/2018 season (100%)	0	284	250	0	0
104	RUS	Anastasia Tarakanova	534	2016/2017 season (100%)	0	0	0	0	0
104	RUS	Anastasia Tarakanova	534	2015/2016 season (70%)	0	0	0	0	0
106	NOR	Camilla Gjersem	521	2017/2018 season (100%)	0	0	0	182	164
106	NOR	Camilla Gjersem	521	2016/2017 season (100%)	0	0	0	0	0
106	NOR	Camilla Gjersem	521	2015/2016 season (70%)	0	0	0	175	0
107	ITA	Lucrezia Gennaro	513	2017/2018 season (100%)	0	0	0	203	164
107	ITA	Lucrezia Gennaro	513	2016/2017 season (100%)	0	0	0	0	0
107	ITA	Lucrezia Gennaro	513	2015/2016 season (70%)	53	93	0	0	0
108	CAN	Alicia Pineault	512	2017/2018 season (100%)	237	0	0	178	0
108	CAN	Alicia Pineault	512	2016/2017 season (100%)	0	97	0	0	0
108	CAN	Alicia Pineault	512	2015/2016 season (70%)	0	0	0	0	0
108	GBR	Karly Robertson	512	2017/2018 season (100%)	0	0	0	182	0
108	GBR	Karly Robertson	512	2016/2017 season (100%)	0	0	0	203	0
108	GBR	Karly Robertson	512	2015/2016 season (70%)	0	0	0	127	0
110	JPN	Mariko Kihara	498	2017/2018 season (100%)	0	0	0	0	0
110	JPN	Mariko Kihara	498	2016/2017 season (100%)	0	0	0	198	0
110	JPN	Mariko Kihara	498	2015/2016 season (70%)	0	0	0	175	125
111	HKG	Yi Christy Leung	486	2017/2018 season (100%)	174	0	0	0	0
111	HKG	Yi Christy Leung	486	2016/2017 season (100%)	215	97	0	0	0
111	HKG	Yi Christy Leung	486	2015/2016 season (70%)	0	0	0	0	0
112	RUS	Daria Panenkova	480	2017/2018 season (100%)	0	250	230	0	0
112	RUS	Daria Panenkova	480	2016/2017 season (100%)	0	0	0	0	0
112	RUS	Daria Panenkova	480	2015/2016 season (70%)	0	0	0	0	0
113	CAN	Sarah Tamura	460	2017/2018 season (100%)	0	0	0	0	0
113	CAN	Sarah Tamura	460	2016/2017 season (100%)	93	148	120	0	0
113	CAN	Sarah Tamura	460	2015/2016 season (70%)	99	0	0	0	0
114	JPN	Yuhana Yokoi	459	2017/2018 season (100%)	295	164	0	0	0
114	JPN	Yuhana Yokoi	459	2016/2017 season (100%)	0	0	0	0	0
114	JPN	Yuhana Yokoi	459	2015/2016 season (70%)	0	0	0	0	0
115	RUS	Valeria Mikhailova	455	2017/2018 season (100%)	0	213	0	0	0
115	RUS	Valeria Mikhailova	455	2016/2017 season (100%)	0	0	0	0	0
115	RUS	Valeria Mikhailova	455	2015/2016 season (70%)	0	127	115	0	0
115	RUS	Elizaveta Nugumanova	455	2017/2018 season (100%)	0	0	0	0	0
115	RUS	Elizaveta Nugumanova	455	2016/2017 season (100%)	0	230	225	0	0
115	RUS	Elizaveta Nugumanova	455	2015/2016 season (70%)	0	0	0	0	0
117	ESP	Valentina Matos	451	2017/2018 season (100%)	0	0	0	0	0
117	ESP	Valentina Matos	451	2016/2017 season (100%)	44	0	0	225	182
117	ESP	Valentina Matos	451	2015/2016 season (70%)	0	0	0	0	0
118	AZE	Morgan Flood	450	2017/2018 season (100%)	0	0	0	225	225
118	AZE	Morgan Flood	450	2016/2017 season (100%)	0	0	0	0	0
118	AZE	Morgan Flood	450	2015/2016 season (70%)	0	0	0	0	0
119	FRA	Julie Froetscher	445	2017/2018 season (100%)	0	0	0	164	0
119	FRA	Julie Froetscher	445	2016/2017 season (100%)	0	148	133	0	0
119	FRA	Julie Froetscher	445	2015/2016 season (70%)	0	0	0	0	0
120	RSA	Michaela Du Toit	443	2017/2018 season (100%)	0	0	0	0	0
120	RSA	Michaela Du Toit	443	2016/2017 season (100%)	0	0	0	203	0
120	RSA	Michaela Du Toit	443	2015/2016 season (70%)	98	0	0	142	0
121	JPN	Yuna Aoki	439	2017/2018 season (100%)	0	0	0	0	0
121	JPN	Yuna Aoki	439	2016/2017 season (100%)	0	182	164	0	0
121	JPN	Yuna Aoki	439	2015/2016 season (70%)	0	93	0	0	0
122	PHI	Alisson Krystle Perticheto	432	2017/2018 season (100%)	0	0	0	0	0
122	PHI	Alisson Krystle Perticheto	432	2016/2017 season (100%)	0	0	0	250	182
122	PHI	Alisson Krystle Perticheto	432	2015/2016 season (70%)	0	0	0	0	0
123	KOR	Ji Hyun Byun	429	2017/2018 season (100%)	0	0	0	0	0
123	KOR	Ji Hyun Byun	429	2016/2017 season (100%)	0	0	0	160	0
123	KOR	Ji Hyun Byun	429	2015/2016 season (70%)	0	127	0	142	0
124	ITA	Guia Maria Tagliapietra	428	2017/2018 season (100%)	0	0	0	0	0
124	ITA	Guia Maria Tagliapietra	428	2016/2017 season (100%)	0	0	0	225	203
124	ITA	Guia Maria Tagliapietra	428	2015/2016 season (70%)	0	0	0	0	0
125	GBR	Nina Povey	422	2017/2018 season (100%)	0	0	0	219	203
125	GBR	Nina Povey	422	2016/2017 season (100%)	0	0	0	0	0
125	GBR	Nina Povey	422	2015/2016 season (70%)	0	0	0	0	0
126	ITA	Alessia Zardini	421	2017/2018 season (100%)	0	0	0	0	0
126	ITA	Alessia Zardini	421	2016/2017 season (100%)	0	0	0	164	0
126	ITA	Alessia Zardini	421	2015/2016 season (70%)	0	0	0	142	115
127	EST	Kristina Shkuleta-Gromova	420	2017/2018 season (100%)	0	120	97	0	0
127	EST	Kristina Shkuleta-Gromova	420	2016/2017 season (100%)	0	0	0	203	0
127	EST	Kristina Shkuleta-Gromova	420	2015/2016 season (70%)	0	0	0	0	0
128	USA	Tessa Hong	416	2017/2018 season (100%)	0	148	0	0	0
128	USA	Tessa Hong	416	2016/2017 season (100%)	0	164	0	0	0
128	USA	Tessa Hong	416	2015/2016 season (70%)	0	104	0	0	0
129	USA	Ting Cui	414	2017/2018 season (100%)	266	148	0	0	0
129	USA	Ting Cui	414	2016/2017 season (100%)	0	0	0	0	0
129	USA	Ting Cui	414	2015/2016 season (70%)	0	0	0	0	0
130	JPN	Nana Araki	407	2017/2018 season (100%)	0	225	182	0	0
130	JPN	Nana Araki	407	2016/2017 season (100%)	0	0	0	0	0
130	JPN	Nana Araki	407	2015/2016 season (70%)	0	0	0	0	0
130	UKR	Anastasiia Arkhipova	407	2017/2018 season (100%)	141	133	133	0	0
130	UKR	Anastasiia Arkhipova	407	2016/2017 season (100%)	0	0	0	0	0
130	UKR	Anastasiia Arkhipova	407	2015/2016 season (70%)	0	0	0	0	0
130	FRA	Lea Serna	407	2017/2018 season (100%)	0	0	0	225	0
130	FRA	Lea Serna	407	2016/2017 season (100%)	0	0	0	182	0
130	FRA	Lea Serna	407	2015/2016 season (70%)	0	0	0	0	0
133	DEN	Pernille Sorensen	393	2017/2018 season (100%)	102	0	0	164	0
133	DEN	Pernille Sorensen	393	2016/2017 season (100%)	0	0	0	0	0
133	DEN	Pernille Sorensen	393	2015/2016 season (70%)	0	0	0	127	0
134	RUS	Mariia Bessonova	389	2017/2018 season (100%)	0	0	0	0	0
134	RUS	Mariia Bessonova	389	2016/2017 season (100%)	0	0	0	225	164
134	RUS	Mariia Bessonova	389	2015/2016 season (70%)	0	0	0	0	0
135	GBR	Danielle Harrison	385	2017/2018 season (100%)	0	0	0	203	182
135	GBR	Danielle Harrison	385	2016/2017 season (100%)	0	0	0	0	0
135	GBR	Danielle Harrison	385	2015/2016 season (70%)	0	0	0	0	0
135	SVK	Nina Letenayova	385	2017/2018 season (100%)	0	0	0	203	182
135	SVK	Nina Letenayova	385	2016/2017 season (100%)	0	0	0	0	0
135	SVK	Nina Letenayova	385	2015/2016 season (70%)	0	0	0	0	0
137	USA	Paige Rydberg	381	2017/2018 season (100%)	0	0	0	0	0
137	USA	Paige Rydberg	381	2016/2017 season (100%)	0	0	0	198	0
137	USA	Paige Rydberg	381	2015/2016 season (70%)	0	115	68	0	0
138	HKG	Maisy Hiu Ching Ma	378	2017/2018 season (100%)	0	0	0	0	0
138	HKG	Maisy Hiu Ching Ma	378	2016/2017 season (100%)	140	0	0	0	0
138	HKG	Maisy Hiu Ching Ma	378	2015/2016 season (70%)	80	0	0	158	0
139	LTU	Aleksandra Golovkina	372	2017/2018 season (100%)	0	0	0	0	0
139	LTU	Aleksandra Golovkina	372	2016/2017 season (100%)	0	0	0	0	0
139	LTU	Aleksandra Golovkina	372	2015/2016 season (70%)	121	0	0	139	112
140	USA	Polina Edmunds	369	2017/2018 season (100%)	0	0	0	0	0
140	USA	Polina Edmunds	369	2016/2017 season (100%)	0	0	0	0	0
140	USA	Polina Edmunds	369	2015/2016 season (70%)	0	204	165	0	0
141	CZE	Elizaveta Ukolova	368	2017/2018 season (100%)	0	0	0	0	0
141	CZE	Elizaveta Ukolova	368	2016/2017 season (100%)	0	0	0	0	0
141	CZE	Elizaveta Ukolova	368	2015/2016 season (70%)	0	68	0	158	142
142	RUS	Alisa Lozko	367	2017/2018 season (100%)	0	0	0	0	0
142	RUS	Alisa Lozko	367	2016/2017 season (100%)	0	203	164	0	0
142	RUS	Alisa Lozko	367	2015/2016 season (70%)	0	0	0	0	0
142	ROU	Julia Sauter	367	2017/2018 season (100%)	0	0	0	164	0
142	ROU	Julia Sauter	367	2016/2017 season (100%)	0	0	0	203	0
142	ROU	Julia Sauter	367	2015/2016 season (70%)	0	0	0	0	0
142	JPN	Riko Takino	367	2017/2018 season (100%)	0	203	164	0	0
142	JPN	Riko Takino	367	2016/2017 season (100%)	0	0	0	0	0
142	JPN	Riko Takino	367	2015/2016 season (70%)	0	0	0	0	0
142	SWE	Josefin Taljegard	367	2017/2018 season (100%)	0	0	0	203	164
142	SWE	Josefin Taljegard	367	2016/2017 season (100%)	0	0	0	0	0
142	SWE	Josefin Taljegard	367	2015/2016 season (70%)	0	0	0	0	0
146	JPN	Miyu Nakashio	361	2017/2018 season (100%)	0	0	0	0	0
146	JPN	Miyu Nakashio	361	2016/2017 season (100%)	0	0	0	219	0
146	JPN	Miyu Nakashio	361	2015/2016 season (70%)	0	0	0	142	0
146	AUT	Lara Roth	361	2017/2018 season (100%)	0	0	0	0	0
146	AUT	Lara Roth	361	2016/2017 season (100%)	0	0	0	203	0
146	AUT	Lara Roth	361	2015/2016 season (70%)	0	0	0	158	0
148	RUS	Maria Artemieva	359	2017/2018 season (100%)	0	0	0	0	0
148	RUS	Maria Artemieva	359	2016/2017 season (100%)	0	0	0	0	0
148	RUS	Maria Artemieva	359	2015/2016 season (70%)	0	0	0	189	170
149	CHN	Ziquan Zhao	348	2017/2018 season (100%)	156	0	0	0	0
149	CHN	Ziquan Zhao	348	2016/2017 season (100%)	192	0	0	0	0
149	CHN	Ziquan Zhao	348	2015/2016 season (70%)	121	0	0	0	0
150	AUT	Sophia Schaller	347	2017/2018 season (100%)	0	0	0	250	0
150	AUT	Sophia Schaller	347	2016/2017 season (100%)	0	97	0	0	0
150	AUT	Sophia Schaller	347	2015/2016 season (70%)	0	0	0	0	0
151	GBR	Katie Powell	346	2017/2018 season (100%)	0	0	0	0	0
151	GBR	Katie Powell	346	2016/2017 season (100%)	0	0	0	182	164
151	GBR	Katie Powell	346	2015/2016 season (70%)	0	0	0	0	0
152	NED	Niki Wories	342	2017/2018 season (100%)	0	0	0	250	0
152	NED	Niki Wories	342	2016/2017 season (100%)	0	0	0	0	0
152	NED	Niki Wories	342	2015/2016 season (70%)	92	0	0	0	0
153	CAN	Michelle Long	336	2017/2018 season (100%)	192	0	0	144	0
153	CAN	Michelle Long	336	2016/2017 season (100%)	0	0	0	0	0
153	CAN	Michelle Long	336	2015/2016 season (70%)	0	0	0	0	0
154	CZE	Anna Dušková	335	2017/2018 season (100%)	0	0	0	0	0
154	CZE	Anna Dušková	335	2016/2017 season (100%)	0	0	0	0	0
154	CZE	Anna Dušková	335	2015/2016 season (70%)	0	68	0	142	125
155	CAN	Aurora Cotop	334	2017/2018 season (100%)	93	133	108	0	0
155	CAN	Aurora Cotop	334	2016/2017 season (100%)	0	0	0	0	0
155	CAN	Aurora Cotop	334	2015/2016 season (70%)	0	0	0	0	0
156	FIN	Liubov Efimenko	333	2017/2018 season (100%)	0	0	0	0	0
156	FIN	Liubov Efimenko	333	2016/2017 season (100%)	0	0	0	0	0
156	FIN	Liubov Efimenko	333	2015/2016 season (70%)	0	0	0	175	158
157	USA	Kaitlyn Nguyen	328	2017/2018 season (100%)	0	164	164	0	0
157	USA	Kaitlyn Nguyen	328	2016/2017 season (100%)	0	0	0	0	0
157	USA	Kaitlyn Nguyen	328	2015/2016 season (70%)	0	0	0	0	0
157	ITA	Chenny Paolucci	328	2017/2018 season (100%)	0	0	0	164	164
157	ITA	Chenny Paolucci	328	2016/2017 season (100%)	0	0	0	0	0
157	ITA	Chenny Paolucci	328	2015/2016 season (70%)	0	0	0	0	0
159	CAN	Veronik Mallet	325	2017/2018 season (100%)	0	0	0	0	0
159	CAN	Veronik Mallet	325	2016/2017 season (100%)	0	0	0	0	0
159	CAN	Veronik Mallet	325	2015/2016 season (70%)	150	0	0	175	0
160	JPN	Akari Matsuoka	315	2017/2018 season (100%)	0	182	133	0	0
160	JPN	Akari Matsuoka	315	2016/2017 season (100%)	0	0	0	0	0
160	JPN	Akari Matsuoka	315	2015/2016 season (70%)	0	0	0	0	0
161	THA	Thita Lamsam	311	2017/2018 season (100%)	83	0	0	164	0
161	THA	Thita Lamsam	311	2016/2017 season (100%)	0	0	0	0	0
161	THA	Thita Lamsam	311	2015/2016 season (70%)	64	0	0	0	0
162	KOR	Yujin Choi	309	2017/2018 season (100%)	0	0	0	0	0
162	KOR	Yujin Choi	309	2016/2017 season (100%)	0	0	0	225	0
162	KOR	Yujin Choi	309	2015/2016 season (70%)	0	84	0	0	0
163	SUI	Yasmine Kimiko Yamada	306	2017/2018 season (100%)	0	0	0	164	0
163	SUI	Yasmine Kimiko Yamada	306	2016/2017 season (100%)	0	0	0	0	0
163	SUI	Yasmine Kimiko Yamada	306	2015/2016 season (70%)	0	0	0	142	0
164	USA	Ashley Lin	296	2017/2018 season (100%)	0	148	0	0	0
164	USA	Ashley Lin	296	2016/2017 season (100%)	0	148	0	0	0
164	USA	Ashley Lin	296	2015/2016 season (70%)	0	0	0	0	0
165	EST	Johanna Allik	285	2017/2018 season (100%)	0	0	0	0	0
165	EST	Johanna Allik	285	2016/2017 season (100%)	0	0	0	0	0
165	EST	Johanna Allik	285	2015/2016 season (70%)	0	0	0	158	127
166	USA	Vivian Le	284	2017/2018 season (100%)	0	0	0	0	0
166	USA	Vivian Le	284	2016/2017 season (100%)	0	0	0	0	0
166	USA	Vivian Le	284	2015/2016 season (70%)	0	142	142	0	0
167	USA	Emily Chan	282	2017/2018 season (100%)	0	0	0	0	0
167	USA	Emily Chan	282	2016/2017 season (100%)	0	0	0	178	0
167	USA	Emily Chan	282	2015/2016 season (70%)	0	104	0	0	0
168	SWE	Elin Hallberg	279	2017/2018 season (100%)	0	0	0	164	0
168	SWE	Elin Hallberg	279	2016/2017 season (100%)	0	0	0	0	0
168	SWE	Elin Hallberg	279	2015/2016 season (70%)	0	0	0	115	0
169	USA	Hannah Miller	269	2017/2018 season (100%)	0	0	0	144	0
169	USA	Hannah Miller	269	2016/2017 season (100%)	0	0	0	0	0
169	USA	Hannah Miller	269	2015/2016 season (70%)	0	0	0	125	0
169	RUS	Diana Pervushkina	269	2017/2018 season (100%)	0	0	0	0	0
169	RUS	Diana Pervushkina	269	2016/2017 season (100%)	0	0	0	0	0
169	RUS	Diana Pervushkina	269	2015/2016 season (70%)	0	142	127	0	0
171	SGP	Shuran Yu	266	2017/2018 season (100%)	0	0	0	0	0
171	SGP	Shuran Yu	266	2016/2017 season (100%)	102	0	0	164	0
171	SGP	Shuran Yu	266	2015/2016 season (70%)	0	0	0	0	0
172	RUS	Ekaterina Mitrofanova	262	2017/2018 season (100%)	0	0	0	0	0
172	RUS	Ekaterina Mitrofanova	262	2016/2017 season (100%)	0	0	0	0	0
172	RUS	Ekaterina Mitrofanova	262	2015/2016 season (70%)	0	158	104	0	0
173	CAN	Roxanne Rheault	257	2017/2018 season (100%)	0	0	0	0	0
173	CAN	Roxanne Rheault	257	2016/2017 season (100%)	0	0	0	0	0
173	CAN	Roxanne Rheault	257	2015/2016 season (70%)	0	0	0	142	115
174	USA	Brynne McIsaac	247	2017/2018 season (100%)	0	0	0	0	0
174	USA	Brynne McIsaac	247	2016/2017 season (100%)	0	120	0	0	0
174	USA	Brynne McIsaac	247	2015/2016 season (70%)	0	127	0	0	0
175	USA	Megan Wessenberg	241	2017/2018 season (100%)	0	0	0	0	0
175	USA	Megan Wessenberg	241	2016/2017 season (100%)	0	148	0	0	0
175	USA	Megan Wessenberg	241	2015/2016 season (70%)	0	93	0	0	0
176	LUX	Fleur Maxwell	240	2017/2018 season (100%)	0	0	0	0	0
176	LUX	Fleur Maxwell	240	2016/2017 season (100%)	0	0	0	0	0
176	LUX	Fleur Maxwell	240	2015/2016 season (70%)	98	0	0	142	0
176	FIN	Juulia Turkkila	240	2017/2018 season (100%)	0	0	0	0	0
176	FIN	Juulia Turkkila	240	2016/2017 season (100%)	0	0	0	0	0
176	FIN	Juulia Turkkila	240	2015/2016 season (70%)	0	0	0	125	115
178	ITA	Lucrezia Beccari	236	2017/2018 season (100%)	103	133	0	0	0
178	ITA	Lucrezia Beccari	236	2016/2017 season (100%)	0	0	0	0	0
178	ITA	Lucrezia Beccari	236	2015/2016 season (70%)	0	0	0	0	0
179	SWE	Selma Ihr	235	2017/2018 season (100%)	127	108	0	0	0
179	SWE	Selma Ihr	235	2016/2017 season (100%)	0	0	0	0	0
179	SWE	Selma Ihr	235	2015/2016 season (70%)	0	0	0	0	0
180	KOR	Hyun Soo Lee	228	2017/2018 season (100%)	0	120	108	0	0
180	KOR	Hyun Soo Lee	228	2016/2017 season (100%)	0	0	0	0	0
180	KOR	Hyun Soo Lee	228	2015/2016 season (70%)	0	0	0	0	0
180	CAN	Alison Schumacher	228	2017/2018 season (100%)	0	120	108	0	0
180	CAN	Alison Schumacher	228	2016/2017 season (100%)	0	0	0	0	0
180	CAN	Alison Schumacher	228	2015/2016 season (70%)	0	0	0	0	0
182	RUS	Anastasia Gulyakova	225	2017/2018 season (100%)	0	225	0	0	0
182	RUS	Anastasia Gulyakova	225	2016/2017 season (100%)	0	0	0	0	0
182	RUS	Anastasia Gulyakova	225	2015/2016 season (70%)	0	0	0	0	0
182	RUS	Evgenia Ivankova	225	2017/2018 season (100%)	0	0	0	0	0
182	RUS	Evgenia Ivankova	225	2016/2017 season (100%)	0	0	0	225	0
182	RUS	Evgenia Ivankova	225	2015/2016 season (70%)	0	0	0	0	0
182	GER	Jennifer Schmidt	225	2017/2018 season (100%)	0	0	0	0	0
182	GER	Jennifer Schmidt	225	2016/2017 season (100%)	0	0	0	225	0
182	GER	Jennifer Schmidt	225	2015/2016 season (70%)	0	0	0	0	0
185	BUL	Alexandra Feigin	222	2017/2018 season (100%)	114	0	0	0	0
185	BUL	Alexandra Feigin	222	2016/2017 season (100%)	0	108	0	0	0
185	BUL	Alexandra Feigin	222	2015/2016 season (70%)	0	0	0	0	0
186	RUS	Anastasia Gracheva	219	2017/2018 season (100%)	0	0	0	219	0
186	RUS	Anastasia Gracheva	219	2016/2017 season (100%)	0	0	0	0	0
186	RUS	Anastasia Gracheva	219	2015/2016 season (70%)	0	0	0	0	0
187	FIN	Joanna Kallela	216	2017/2018 season (100%)	0	0	0	0	0
187	FIN	Joanna Kallela	216	2016/2017 season (100%)	0	108	108	0	0
187	FIN	Joanna Kallela	216	2015/2016 season (70%)	0	0	0	0	0
188	CAN	Larkyn Austman	203	2017/2018 season (100%)	0	0	0	0	0
188	CAN	Larkyn Austman	203	2016/2017 season (100%)	0	0	0	203	0
188	CAN	Larkyn Austman	203	2015/2016 season (70%)	0	0	0	0	0
188	JPN	Rino Kasakake	203	2017/2018 season (100%)	0	203	0	0	0
188	JPN	Rino Kasakake	203	2016/2017 season (100%)	0	0	0	0	0
188	JPN	Rino Kasakake	203	2015/2016 season (70%)	0	0	0	0	0
188	KOR	Sena Kim	203	2017/2018 season (100%)	0	0	0	0	0
188	KOR	Sena Kim	203	2016/2017 season (100%)	0	0	0	203	0
188	KOR	Sena Kim	203	2015/2016 season (70%)	0	0	0	0	0
188	GBR	Anna Litvinenko	203	2017/2018 season (100%)	0	0	0	0	0
188	GBR	Anna Litvinenko	203	2016/2017 season (100%)	0	0	0	203	0
188	GBR	Anna Litvinenko	203	2015/2016 season (70%)	0	0	0	0	0
188	ITA	Anna Memola	203	2017/2018 season (100%)	0	0	0	203	0
188	ITA	Anna Memola	203	2016/2017 season (100%)	0	0	0	0	0
188	ITA	Anna Memola	203	2015/2016 season (70%)	0	0	0	0	0
193	RUS	Natalia Ogoreltseva	198	2017/2018 season (100%)	0	0	0	0	0
193	RUS	Natalia Ogoreltseva	198	2016/2017 season (100%)	0	0	0	198	0
193	RUS	Natalia Ogoreltseva	198	2015/2016 season (70%)	0	0	0	0	0
194	USA	Nina Ouellette	184	2017/2018 season (100%)	0	0	0	0	0
194	USA	Nina Ouellette	184	2016/2017 season (100%)	0	108	0	0	0
194	USA	Nina Ouellette	184	2015/2016 season (70%)	0	76	0	0	0
195	MEX	Andrea Montesinos Cantu	183	2017/2018 season (100%)	0	0	0	0	0
195	MEX	Andrea Montesinos Cantu	183	2016/2017 season (100%)	75	108	0	0	0
195	MEX	Andrea Montesinos Cantu	183	2015/2016 season (70%)	0	0	0	0	0
196	KAZ	Zhansaya Adykhanova	182	2017/2018 season (100%)	0	0	0	182	0
196	KAZ	Zhansaya Adykhanova	182	2016/2017 season (100%)	0	0	0	0	0
196	KAZ	Zhansaya Adykhanova	182	2015/2016 season (70%)	0	0	0	0	0
196	KOR	Seoyoung Lee	182	2017/2018 season (100%)	0	0	0	0	0
196	KOR	Seoyoung Lee	182	2016/2017 season (100%)	0	0	0	182	0
196	KOR	Seoyoung Lee	182	2015/2016 season (70%)	0	0	0	0	0
196	FRA	Sandra Ramond	182	2017/2018 season (100%)	0	0	0	182	0
196	FRA	Sandra Ramond	182	2016/2017 season (100%)	0	0	0	0	0
196	FRA	Sandra Ramond	182	2015/2016 season (70%)	0	0	0	0	0
196	SWE	Natasja Remstedt	182	2017/2018 season (100%)	0	0	0	0	0
196	SWE	Natasja Remstedt	182	2016/2017 season (100%)	0	0	0	182	0
196	SWE	Natasja Remstedt	182	2015/2016 season (70%)	0	0	0	0	0
196	AUT	Alisa Stomakhina	182	2017/2018 season (100%)	0	0	0	182	0
196	AUT	Alisa Stomakhina	182	2016/2017 season (100%)	0	0	0	0	0
196	AUT	Alisa Stomakhina	182	2015/2016 season (70%)	0	0	0	0	0
201	CHN	Hongyi Chen	180	2017/2018 season (100%)	83	97	0	0	0
201	CHN	Hongyi Chen	180	2016/2017 season (100%)	0	0	0	0	0
201	CHN	Hongyi Chen	180	2015/2016 season (70%)	0	0	0	0	0
202	CAN	Emy Decelles	178	2017/2018 season (100%)	0	0	0	178	0
202	CAN	Emy Decelles	178	2016/2017 season (100%)	0	0	0	0	0
202	CAN	Emy Decelles	178	2015/2016 season (70%)	0	0	0	0	0
203	GER	Maria-Katharina Herceg	164	2017/2018 season (100%)	0	0	0	0	0
203	GER	Maria-Katharina Herceg	164	2016/2017 season (100%)	0	0	0	164	0
203	GER	Maria-Katharina Herceg	164	2015/2016 season (70%)	0	0	0	0	0
203	JPN	Kokoro Iwamoto	164	2017/2018 season (100%)	0	0	0	0	0
203	JPN	Kokoro Iwamoto	164	2016/2017 season (100%)	0	164	0	0	0
203	JPN	Kokoro Iwamoto	164	2015/2016 season (70%)	0	0	0	0	0
203	AUT	Anita Kapferer	164	2017/2018 season (100%)	0	0	0	0	0
203	AUT	Anita Kapferer	164	2016/2017 season (100%)	0	0	0	164	0
203	AUT	Anita Kapferer	164	2015/2016 season (70%)	0	0	0	0	0
203	KOR	Haejin Kim	164	2017/2018 season (100%)	0	0	0	0	0
203	KOR	Haejin Kim	164	2016/2017 season (100%)	0	0	0	164	0
203	KOR	Haejin Kim	164	2015/2016 season (70%)	0	0	0	0	0
203	ESP	Sonia Lafuente	164	2017/2018 season (100%)	0	0	0	0	0
203	ESP	Sonia Lafuente	164	2016/2017 season (100%)	0	0	0	164	0
203	ESP	Sonia Lafuente	164	2015/2016 season (70%)	0	0	0	0	0
203	BUL	Svetoslava Ryadkova	164	2017/2018 season (100%)	0	0	0	164	0
203	BUL	Svetoslava Ryadkova	164	2016/2017 season (100%)	0	0	0	0	0
203	BUL	Svetoslava Ryadkova	164	2015/2016 season (70%)	0	0	0	0	0
203	GER	Alissa Scheidt	164	2017/2018 season (100%)	0	0	0	164	0
203	GER	Alissa Scheidt	164	2016/2017 season (100%)	0	0	0	0	0
203	GER	Alissa Scheidt	164	2015/2016 season (70%)	0	0	0	0	0
210	FIN	Anni Järvenpää	161	2017/2018 season (100%)	0	0	0	0	0
210	FIN	Anni Järvenpää	161	2016/2017 season (100%)	0	0	0	0	0
210	FIN	Anni Järvenpää	161	2015/2016 season (70%)	0	93	68	0	0
211	JPN	Haruka Imai	158	2017/2018 season (100%)	0	0	0	0	0
211	JPN	Haruka Imai	158	2016/2017 season (100%)	0	0	0	0	0
211	JPN	Haruka Imai	158	2015/2016 season (70%)	0	0	0	158	0
211	AUT	Belinda Schönberger	158	2017/2018 season (100%)	0	0	0	0	0
211	AUT	Belinda Schönberger	158	2016/2017 season (100%)	0	0	0	0	0
211	AUT	Belinda Schönberger	158	2015/2016 season (70%)	0	0	0	158	0
213	AUT	Stefanie Pesendorfer	157	2017/2018 season (100%)	157	0	0	0	0
213	AUT	Stefanie Pesendorfer	157	2016/2017 season (100%)	0	0	0	0	0
213	AUT	Stefanie Pesendorfer	157	2015/2016 season (70%)	0	0	0	0	0
214	TUR	Guzide Irmak Bayir	152	2017/2018 season (100%)	0	97	0	0	0
214	TUR	Guzide Irmak Bayir	152	2016/2017 season (100%)	55	0	0	0	0
214	TUR	Guzide Irmak Bayir	152	2015/2016 season (70%)	0	0	0	0	0
215	JPN	Moa Iwano	148	2017/2018 season (100%)	0	148	0	0	0
215	JPN	Moa Iwano	148	2016/2017 season (100%)	0	0	0	0	0
215	JPN	Moa Iwano	148	2015/2016 season (70%)	0	0	0	0	0
215	JPN	Akari Matsubara	148	2017/2018 season (100%)	0	148	0	0	0
215	JPN	Akari Matsubara	148	2016/2017 season (100%)	0	0	0	0	0
215	JPN	Akari Matsubara	148	2015/2016 season (70%)	0	0	0	0	0
217	ISR	Aimee Buchanan	144	2017/2018 season (100%)	0	0	0	0	0
217	ISR	Aimee Buchanan	144	2016/2017 season (100%)	0	0	0	144	0
217	ISR	Aimee Buchanan	144	2015/2016 season (70%)	0	0	0	0	0
217	USA	Franchesca Chiera	144	2017/2018 season (100%)	0	0	0	0	0
217	USA	Franchesca Chiera	144	2016/2017 season (100%)	0	0	0	144	0
217	USA	Franchesca Chiera	144	2015/2016 season (70%)	0	0	0	0	0
219	TUR	Sıla Saygı	142	2017/2018 season (100%)	0	0	0	0	0
219	TUR	Sıla Saygı	142	2016/2017 season (100%)	0	0	0	0	0
219	TUR	Sıla Saygı	142	2015/2016 season (70%)	0	0	0	142	0
220	UKR	Anastasia Gozhva	141	2017/2018 season (100%)	0	0	0	0	0
220	UKR	Anastasia Gozhva	141	2016/2017 season (100%)	0	0	0	0	0
220	UKR	Anastasia Gozhva	141	2015/2016 season (70%)	65	76	0	0	0
221	FRA	Alizee Crozet	140	2017/2018 season (100%)	0	0	0	0	0
221	FRA	Alizee Crozet	140	2016/2017 season (100%)	0	97	0	0	0
221	FRA	Alizee Crozet	140	2015/2016 season (70%)	43	0	0	0	0
222	JPN	Riona Kato	139	2017/2018 season (100%)	0	0	0	0	0
222	JPN	Riona Kato	139	2016/2017 season (100%)	0	0	0	0	0
222	JPN	Riona Kato	139	2015/2016 season (70%)	0	0	0	139	0
222	CAN	Selena Zhao	139	2017/2018 season (100%)	0	0	0	0	0
222	CAN	Selena Zhao	139	2016/2017 season (100%)	0	0	0	0	0
222	CAN	Selena Zhao	139	2015/2016 season (70%)	0	0	0	139	0
224	USA	Hanna Harrell	133	2017/2018 season (100%)	0	133	0	0	0
224	USA	Hanna Harrell	133	2016/2017 season (100%)	0	0	0	0	0
224	USA	Hanna Harrell	133	2015/2016 season (70%)	0	0	0	0	0
224	GER	Annika Hocke	133	2017/2018 season (100%)	0	0	0	0	0
224	GER	Annika Hocke	133	2016/2017 season (100%)	0	133	0	0	0
224	GER	Annika Hocke	133	2015/2016 season (70%)	0	0	0	0	0
224	USA	Gabrielle Noullet	133	2017/2018 season (100%)	0	0	0	0	0
224	USA	Gabrielle Noullet	133	2016/2017 season (100%)	0	133	0	0	0
224	USA	Gabrielle Noullet	133	2015/2016 season (70%)	0	0	0	0	0
227	ITA	Chiara Calderone	127	2017/2018 season (100%)	0	0	0	0	0
227	ITA	Chiara Calderone	127	2016/2017 season (100%)	0	0	0	0	0
227	ITA	Chiara Calderone	127	2015/2016 season (70%)	0	0	0	127	0
227	GBR	Zoe Jones	127	2017/2018 season (100%)	0	0	0	0	0
227	GBR	Zoe Jones	127	2016/2017 season (100%)	0	0	0	0	0
227	GBR	Zoe Jones	127	2015/2016 season (70%)	0	0	0	127	0
227	EST	Jelizaveta Leonova	127	2017/2018 season (100%)	0	0	0	0	0
227	EST	Jelizaveta Leonova	127	2016/2017 season (100%)	0	0	0	0	0
227	EST	Jelizaveta Leonova	127	2015/2016 season (70%)	0	0	0	127	0
227	GBR	Rowena Mackessack-Leitch	127	2017/2018 season (100%)	0	0	0	0	0
227	GBR	Rowena Mackessack-Leitch	127	2016/2017 season (100%)	0	0	0	0	0
227	GBR	Rowena Mackessack-Leitch	127	2015/2016 season (70%)	0	0	0	127	0
227	FIN	Emilia Toikkanen	127	2017/2018 season (100%)	0	0	0	0	0
227	FIN	Emilia Toikkanen	127	2016/2017 season (100%)	0	0	0	0	0
227	FIN	Emilia Toikkanen	127	2015/2016 season (70%)	0	0	0	127	0
227	USA	Maria Yang	127	2017/2018 season (100%)	0	0	0	0	0
227	USA	Maria Yang	127	2016/2017 season (100%)	0	0	0	0	0
227	USA	Maria Yang	127	2015/2016 season (70%)	0	0	0	127	0
233	KOR	Su Been Jeon	120	2017/2018 season (100%)	0	120	0	0	0
233	KOR	Su Been Jeon	120	2016/2017 season (100%)	0	0	0	0	0
233	KOR	Su Been Jeon	120	2015/2016 season (70%)	0	0	0	0	0
233	UKR	Sofiia Nesterova	120	2017/2018 season (100%)	0	120	0	0	0
233	UKR	Sofiia Nesterova	120	2016/2017 season (100%)	0	0	0	0	0
233	UKR	Sofiia Nesterova	120	2015/2016 season (70%)	0	0	0	0	0
233	FIN	Sofia Sula	120	2017/2018 season (100%)	0	120	0	0	0
233	FIN	Sofia Sula	120	2016/2017 season (100%)	0	0	0	0	0
233	FIN	Sofia Sula	120	2015/2016 season (70%)	0	0	0	0	0
236	USA	Ashley Cain	115	2017/2018 season (100%)	0	0	0	0	0
236	USA	Ashley Cain	115	2016/2017 season (100%)	0	0	0	0	0
236	USA	Ashley Cain	115	2015/2016 season (70%)	0	0	0	115	0
236	ITA	Sara Casella	115	2017/2018 season (100%)	0	0	0	0	0
236	ITA	Sara Casella	115	2016/2017 season (100%)	0	0	0	0	0
236	ITA	Sara Casella	115	2015/2016 season (70%)	0	115	0	0	0
236	KOR	So Yeon Im	115	2017/2018 season (100%)	0	0	0	0	0
236	KOR	So Yeon Im	115	2016/2017 season (100%)	0	0	0	0	0
236	KOR	So Yeon Im	115	2015/2016 season (70%)	0	0	0	115	0
236	FIN	Hanna Kiviniemi	115	2017/2018 season (100%)	0	0	0	0	0
236	FIN	Hanna Kiviniemi	115	2016/2017 season (100%)	0	0	0	0	0
236	FIN	Hanna Kiviniemi	115	2015/2016 season (70%)	0	0	0	115	0
236	SLO	Ursa Krusec	115	2017/2018 season (100%)	0	0	0	0	0
236	SLO	Ursa Krusec	115	2016/2017 season (100%)	0	0	0	0	0
236	SLO	Ursa Krusec	115	2015/2016 season (70%)	0	0	0	115	0
236	HUN	Eszter Szombathelyi	115	2017/2018 season (100%)	0	0	0	0	0
236	HUN	Eszter Szombathelyi	115	2016/2017 season (100%)	0	0	0	0	0
236	HUN	Eszter Szombathelyi	115	2015/2016 season (70%)	0	0	0	115	0
236	BUL	Hristina Vassileva	115	2017/2018 season (100%)	0	0	0	0	0
236	BUL	Hristina Vassileva	115	2016/2017 season (100%)	0	0	0	0	0
236	BUL	Hristina Vassileva	115	2015/2016 season (70%)	0	0	0	115	0
243	ISR	Katarina Kulgeyko	112	2017/2018 season (100%)	0	0	0	0	0
243	ISR	Katarina Kulgeyko	112	2016/2017 season (100%)	0	0	0	0	0
243	ISR	Katarina Kulgeyko	112	2015/2016 season (70%)	0	0	0	112	0
244	CAN	Olivia Gran	108	2017/2018 season (100%)	0	0	0	0	0
244	CAN	Olivia Gran	108	2016/2017 season (100%)	0	108	0	0	0
244	CAN	Olivia Gran	108	2015/2016 season (70%)	0	0	0	0	0
244	KOR	Eun Bi Ko	108	2017/2018 season (100%)	0	108	0	0	0
244	KOR	Eun Bi Ko	108	2016/2017 season (100%)	0	0	0	0	0
244	KOR	Eun Bi Ko	108	2015/2016 season (70%)	0	0	0	0	0
246	HKG	Joanna So	102	2017/2018 season (100%)	102	0	0	0	0
246	HKG	Joanna So	102	2016/2017 season (100%)	0	0	0	0	0
246	HKG	Joanna So	102	2015/2016 season (70%)	0	0	0	0	0
246	NED	Kyarha Van Tiel	102	2017/2018 season (100%)	44	0	0	0	0
246	NED	Kyarha Van Tiel	102	2016/2017 season (100%)	0	0	0	0	0
246	NED	Kyarha Van Tiel	102	2015/2016 season (70%)	58	0	0	0	0
248	CAN	Emily Bausback	97	2017/2018 season (100%)	0	0	0	0	0
248	CAN	Emily Bausback	97	2016/2017 season (100%)	0	97	0	0	0
248	CAN	Emily Bausback	97	2015/2016 season (70%)	0	0	0	0	0
248	USA	Angelina Huang	97	2017/2018 season (100%)	0	97	0	0	0
248	USA	Angelina Huang	97	2016/2017 season (100%)	0	0	0	0	0
248	USA	Angelina Huang	97	2015/2016 season (70%)	0	0	0	0	0
250	KOR	Se Bin Park	93	2017/2018 season (100%)	0	0	0	0	0
250	KOR	Se Bin Park	93	2016/2017 season (100%)	0	0	0	0	0
250	KOR	Se Bin Park	93	2015/2016 season (70%)	0	93	0	0	0
251	LTU	Elzbieta Kropa	92	2017/2018 season (100%)	92	0	0	0	0
251	LTU	Elzbieta Kropa	92	2016/2017 season (100%)	0	0	0	0	0
251	LTU	Elzbieta Kropa	92	2015/2016 season (70%)	0	0	0	0	0
251	THA	Natalie Sangkagalo	92	2017/2018 season (100%)	92	0	0	0	0
251	THA	Natalie Sangkagalo	92	2016/2017 season (100%)	0	0	0	0	0
251	THA	Natalie Sangkagalo	92	2015/2016 season (70%)	0	0	0	0	0
253	CHN	Lu Zheng	88	2017/2018 season (100%)	0	0	0	0	0
253	CHN	Lu Zheng	88	2016/2017 season (100%)	0	0	0	0	0
253	CHN	Lu Zheng	88	2015/2016 season (70%)	88	0	0	0	0
254	USA	Akari Nakahara	84	2017/2018 season (100%)	0	0	0	0	0
254	USA	Akari Nakahara	84	2016/2017 season (100%)	0	0	0	0	0
254	USA	Akari Nakahara	84	2015/2016 season (70%)	0	84	0	0	0
255	AZE	Kim Cheremsky	76	2017/2018 season (100%)	0	0	0	0	0
255	AZE	Kim Cheremsky	76	2016/2017 season (100%)	0	0	0	0	0
255	AZE	Kim Cheremsky	76	2015/2016 season (70%)	0	76	0	0	0
255	CAN	Kim Decelles	76	2017/2018 season (100%)	0	0	0	0	0
255	CAN	Kim Decelles	76	2016/2017 season (100%)	0	0	0	0	0
255	CAN	Kim Decelles	76	2015/2016 season (70%)	0	76	0	0	0
257	SVK	Silvia Hugec	74	2017/2018 season (100%)	74	0	0	0	0
257	SVK	Silvia Hugec	74	2016/2017 season (100%)	0	0	0	0	0
257	SVK	Silvia Hugec	74	2015/2016 season (70%)	0	0	0	0	0
258	AUS	Katie Pasfield	71	2017/2018 season (100%)	0	0	0	0	0
258	AUS	Katie Pasfield	71	2016/2017 season (100%)	0	0	0	0	0
258	AUS	Katie Pasfield	71	2015/2016 season (70%)	71	0	0	0	0
259	KOR	Hee Soo Cho	68	2017/2018 season (100%)	0	0	0	0	0
259	KOR	Hee Soo Cho	68	2016/2017 season (100%)	0	0	0	0	0
259	KOR	Hee Soo Cho	68	2015/2016 season (70%)	0	68	0	0	0
259	GER	Ann-Christin Marold	68	2017/2018 season (100%)	68	0	0	0	0
259	GER	Ann-Christin Marold	68	2016/2017 season (100%)	0	0	0	0	0
259	GER	Ann-Christin Marold	68	2015/2016 season (70%)	0	0	0	0	0
261	KAZ	Alana Toktarova	55	2017/2018 season (100%)	55	0	0	0	0
261	KAZ	Alana Toktarova	55	2016/2017 season (100%)	0	0	0	0	0
261	KAZ	Alana Toktarova	55	2015/2016 season (70%)	0	0	0	0	0
262	AUS	Holly Harris	49	2017/2018 season (100%)	0	0	0	0	0
262	AUS	Holly Harris	49	2016/2017 season (100%)	49	0	0	0	0
262	AUS	Holly Harris	49	2015/2016 season (70%)	0	0	0	0	0
263	NOR	Juni Marie Benjaminsen	39	2017/2018 season (100%)	0	0	0	0	0
263	NOR	Juni Marie Benjaminsen	39	2016/2017 season (100%)	0	0	0	0	0
263	NOR	Juni Marie Benjaminsen	39	2015/2016 season (70%)	39	0	0	0	0

==== Pairs (97 couples) ====
As of 22 March 2018

Rank	Nation	Couple	Points	Season	ISU Championships or Olympics	(Junior) Grand Prix and Final		Selected International Competition	
Rank	Nation	Couple	Points	Season	Best	Best	2nd Best	Best	2nd Best
1	GER	Aljona Savchenko / Bruno Massot	5270	2017/2018 season (100%)	1200	800	400	270	0
1	GER	Aljona Savchenko / Bruno Massot	5270	2016/2017 season (100%)	1080	400	400	300	0
1	GER	Aljona Savchenko / Bruno Massot	5270	2015/2016 season (70%)	680	0	0	210	210
2	RUS	Evgenia Tarasova / Vladimir Morozov	5117	2017/2018 season (100%)	1080	525	400	300	0
2	RUS	Evgenia Tarasova / Vladimir Morozov	5117	2016/2017 season (100%)	972	800	360	300	0
2	RUS	Evgenia Tarasova / Vladimir Morozov	5117	2015/2016 season (70%)	551	252	149	210	170
3	CAN	Meagan Duhamel / Eric Radford	4582	2017/2018 season (100%)	972	648	400	270	0
3	CAN	Meagan Duhamel / Eric Radford	4582	2016/2017 season (100%)	756	648	400	300	0
3	CAN	Meagan Duhamel / Eric Radford	4582	2015/2016 season (70%)	840	504	280	0	0
4	RUS	Natalia Zabiiako / Alexander Enbert	3985	2017/2018 season (100%)	875	292	292	300	300
4	RUS	Natalia Zabiiako / Alexander Enbert	3985	2016/2017 season (100%)	551	583	360	243	0
4	RUS	Natalia Zabiiako / Alexander Enbert	3985	2015/2016 season (70%)	0	183	0	189	153
5	CHN	Wenjing Sui / Cong Han	3932	2017/2018 season (100%)	1080	720	400	0	0
5	CHN	Wenjing Sui / Cong Han	3932	2016/2017 season (100%)	1200	0	0	0	0
5	CHN	Wenjing Sui / Cong Han	3932	2015/2016 season (70%)	756	280	252	0	0
6	FRA	Vanessa James / Morgan Ciprès	3850	2017/2018 season (100%)	972	360	324	300	0
6	FRA	Vanessa James / Morgan Ciprès	3850	2016/2017 season (100%)	680	324	292	270	0
6	FRA	Vanessa James / Morgan Ciprès	3850	2015/2016 season (70%)	428	252	165	170	158
7	RUS	Ksenia Stolbova / Fedor Klimov	3779	2017/2018 season (100%)	756	583	360	243	0
7	RUS	Ksenia Stolbova / Fedor Klimov	3779	2016/2017 season (100%)	787	0	0	0	0
7	RUS	Ksenia Stolbova / Fedor Klimov	3779	2015/2016 season (70%)	613	560	280	210	0
8	CHN	Xiaoyu Yu / Hao Zhang	3715	2017/2018 season (100%)	638	472	360	250	0
8	CHN	Xiaoyu Yu / Hao Zhang	3715	2016/2017 season (100%)	875	720	400	0	0
8	CHN	Xiaoyu Yu / Hao Zhang	3715	2015/2016 season (70%)	0	0	0	0	0
9	ITA	Nicole Della Monica / Matteo Guarise	3443	2017/2018 season (100%)	787	324	292	270	270
9	ITA	Nicole Della Monica / Matteo Guarise	3443	2016/2017 season (100%)	402	262	236	300	300
9	ITA	Nicole Della Monica / Matteo Guarise	3443	2015/2016 season (70%)	347	183	0	189	170
10	ITA	Valentina Marchei / Ondřej Hotárek	3376	2017/2018 season (100%)	709	292	262	300	243
10	ITA	Valentina Marchei / Ondřej Hotárek	3376	2016/2017 season (100%)	517	292	191	300	270
10	ITA	Valentina Marchei / Ondřej Hotárek	3376	2015/2016 season (70%)	386	165	0	175	175
11	CAN	Julianne Séguin / Charlie Bilodeau	3242	2017/2018 season (100%)	517	292	262	243	0
11	CAN	Julianne Séguin / Charlie Bilodeau	3242	2016/2017 season (100%)	418	525	400	300	0
11	CAN	Julianne Séguin / Charlie Bilodeau	3242	2015/2016 season (70%)	0	408	227	139	0
12	RUS	Kristina Astakhova / Alexei Rogonov	3200	2017/2018 season (100%)	574	324	324	270	270
12	RUS	Kristina Astakhova / Alexei Rogonov	3200	2016/2017 season (100%)	0	324	262	270	270
12	RUS	Kristina Astakhova / Alexei Rogonov	3200	2015/2016 season (70%)	312	183	149	189	189
13	CAN	Liubov Ilyushechkina / Dylan Moscovitch	3139	2017/2018 season (100%)	612	292	236	219	0
13	CAN	Liubov Ilyushechkina / Dylan Moscovitch	3139	2016/2017 season (100%)	709	324	324	270	0
13	CAN	Liubov Ilyushechkina / Dylan Moscovitch	3139	2015/2016 season (70%)	447	183	149	153	0
14	USA	Tarah Kayne / Danny O'Shea	2986	2017/2018 season (100%)	840	0	0	243	0
14	USA	Tarah Kayne / Danny O'Shea	2986	2016/2017 season (100%)	0	292	236	198	0
14	USA	Tarah Kayne / Danny O'Shea	2986	2015/2016 season (70%)	428	204	165	210	170
15	CHN	Cheng Peng / Yang Jin	2724	2017/2018 season (100%)	517	262	262	300	0
15	CHN	Cheng Peng / Yang Jin	2724	2016/2017 season (100%)	551	472	360	0	0
15	CHN	Cheng Peng / Yang Jin	2724	2015/2016 season (70%)	0	0	0	0	0
16	USA	Alexa Scimeca Knierim / Chris Knierim	2697	2017/2018 season (100%)	275	262	262	270	0
16	USA	Alexa Scimeca Knierim / Chris Knierim	2697	2016/2017 season (100%)	496	0	0	0	0
16	USA	Alexa Scimeca Knierim / Chris Knierim	2697	2015/2016 season (70%)	529	252	227	210	189
17	AUS	Ekaterina Alexandrovskaya / Harley Windsor	2619	2017/2018 season (100%)	496	350	250	300	243
17	AUS	Ekaterina Alexandrovskaya / Harley Windsor	2619	2016/2017 season (100%)	500	250	230	0	0
17	AUS	Ekaterina Alexandrovskaya / Harley Windsor	2619	2015/2016 season (70%)	0	0	0	0	0
18	AUT	Miriam Ziegler / Severin Kiefer	2604	2017/2018 season (100%)	446	236	236	219	0
18	AUT	Miriam Ziegler / Severin Kiefer	2604	2016/2017 season (100%)	362	236	236	250	225
18	AUT	Miriam Ziegler / Severin Kiefer	2604	2015/2016 season (70%)	253	165	134	158	139
19	CAN	Kirsten Moore-Towers / Michael Marinaro	2561	2017/2018 season (100%)	709	324	236	300	0
19	CAN	Kirsten Moore-Towers / Michael Marinaro	2561	2016/2017 season (100%)	446	0	0	0	0
19	CAN	Kirsten Moore-Towers / Michael Marinaro	2561	2015/2016 season (70%)	402	227	149	170	0
20	USA	Haven Denney / Brandon Frazier	2137	2017/2018 season (100%)	0	213	213	219	0
20	USA	Haven Denney / Brandon Frazier	2137	2016/2017 season (100%)	402	360	292	219	219
20	USA	Haven Denney / Brandon Frazier	2137	2015/2016 season (70%)	0	0	0	0	0
21	USA	Marissa Castelli / Mervin Tran	2061	2017/2018 season (100%)	0	236	213	219	0
21	USA	Marissa Castelli / Mervin Tran	2061	2016/2017 season (100%)	0	262	213	243	0
21	USA	Marissa Castelli / Mervin Tran	2061	2015/2016 season (70%)	347	204	165	189	139
22	CZE	Anna Dušková / Martin Bidař	2058	2017/2018 season (100%)	418	0	0	0	0
22	CZE	Anna Dušková / Martin Bidař	2058	2016/2017 season (100%)	446	315	250	250	0
22	CZE	Anna Dušková / Martin Bidař	2058	2015/2016 season (70%)	350	221	158	0	0
23	USA	Ashley Cain / Timothy Leduc	2035	2017/2018 season (100%)	756	236	0	219	0
23	USA	Ashley Cain / Timothy Leduc	2035	2016/2017 season (100%)	362	0	0	243	219
23	USA	Ashley Cain / Timothy Leduc	2035	2015/2016 season (70%)	0	0	0	0	0
24	RUS	Aleksandra Boikova / Dmitrii Kozlovskii	1984	2017/2018 season (100%)	0	230	225	300	270
24	RUS	Aleksandra Boikova / Dmitrii Kozlovskii	1984	2016/2017 season (100%)	450	284	225	0	0
24	RUS	Aleksandra Boikova / Dmitrii Kozlovskii	1984	2015/2016 season (70%)	0	0	0	0	0
25	JPN	Sumire Suto / Francis Boudreau-Audet	1839	2017/2018 season (100%)	0	213	191	0	0
25	JPN	Sumire Suto / Francis Boudreau-Audet	1839	2016/2017 season (100%)	325	213	0	250	219
25	JPN	Sumire Suto / Francis Boudreau-Audet	1839	2015/2016 season (70%)	253	0	0	175	0
26	RUS	Yuko Kavaguti / Alexander Smirnov	1712	2017/2018 season (100%)	0	0	0	0	0
26	RUS	Yuko Kavaguti / Alexander Smirnov	1712	2016/2017 season (100%)	0	262	236	270	0
26	RUS	Yuko Kavaguti / Alexander Smirnov	1712	2015/2016 season (70%)	0	454	280	210	0
27	CHN	Yumeng Gao / Zhong Xie	1578	2017/2018 season (100%)	365	255	225	0	0
27	CHN	Yumeng Gao / Zhong Xie	1578	2016/2017 season (100%)	405	164	164	0	0
27	CHN	Yumeng Gao / Zhong Xie	1578	2015/2016 season (70%)	0	0	0	0	0
28	USA	Chelsea Liu / Brian Johnson	1575	2017/2018 season (100%)	0	0	0	243	0
28	USA	Chelsea Liu / Brian Johnson	1575	2016/2017 season (100%)	266	203	164	270	0
28	USA	Chelsea Liu / Brian Johnson	1575	2015/2016 season (70%)	230	115	84	0	0
29	PRK	Tae Ok Ryom / Ju Sik Kim	1523	2017/2018 season (100%)	680	0	0	0	0
29	PRK	Tae Ok Ryom / Ju Sik Kim	1523	2016/2017 season (100%)	275	0	0	250	0
29	PRK	Tae Ok Ryom / Ju Sik Kim	1523	2015/2016 season (70%)	312	0	0	142	139
30	FRA	Lola Esbrat / Andrei Novoselov	1464	2017/2018 season (100%)	325	213	0	219	164
30	FRA	Lola Esbrat / Andrei Novoselov	1464	2016/2017 season (100%)	237	0	0	164	0
30	FRA	Lola Esbrat / Andrei Novoselov	1464	2015/2016 season (70%)	173	0	0	142	142
31	RUS	Alina Ustimkina / Nikita Volodin	1388	2017/2018 season (100%)	0	0	0	198	0
31	RUS	Alina Ustimkina / Nikita Volodin	1388	2016/2017 season (100%)	295	255	225	300	0
31	RUS	Alina Ustimkina / Nikita Volodin	1388	2015/2016 season (70%)	0	115	0	0	0
32	RUS	Alisa Efimova / Alexander Korovin	1221	2017/2018 season (100%)	0	0	0	270	243
32	RUS	Alisa Efimova / Alexander Korovin	1221	2016/2017 season (100%)	0	213	0	270	225
32	RUS	Alisa Efimova / Alexander Korovin	1221	2015/2016 season (70%)	0	0	0	158	0
33	CHN	Xuehan Wang / Lei Wang	1196	2017/2018 season (100%)	0	0	0	0	0
33	CHN	Xuehan Wang / Lei Wang	1196	2016/2017 season (100%)	0	324	292	0	0
33	CHN	Xuehan Wang / Lei Wang	1196	2015/2016 season (70%)	193	204	183	0	0
34	LTU	Goda Butkutė / Nikita Ermolaev	1182	2017/2018 season (100%)	0	0	0	0	0
34	LTU	Goda Butkutė / Nikita Ermolaev	1182	2016/2017 season (100%)	0	191	0	243	203
34	LTU	Goda Butkutė / Nikita Ermolaev	1182	2015/2016 season (70%)	205	0	0	170	170
35	CAN	Evelyn Walsh / Trennt Michaud	1172	2017/2018 season (100%)	295	203	182	0	0
35	CAN	Evelyn Walsh / Trennt Michaud	1172	2016/2017 season (100%)	328	164	0	0	0
35	CAN	Evelyn Walsh / Trennt Michaud	1172	2015/2016 season (70%)	0	0	0	0	0
35	GER	Minerva Fabienne Hase / Nolan Seegert	1172	2017/2018 season (100%)	0	0	0	243	219
35	GER	Minerva Fabienne Hase / Nolan Seegert	1172	2016/2017 season (100%)	264	0	0	243	203
35	GER	Minerva Fabienne Hase / Nolan Seegert	1172	2015/2016 season (70%)	0	0	0	158	127
37	RUS	Amina Atakhanova / Ilia Spiridonov	1171	2017/2018 season (100%)	0	0	0	0	0
37	RUS	Amina Atakhanova / Ilia Spiridonov	1171	2016/2017 season (100%)	365	225	207	0	0
37	RUS	Amina Atakhanova / Ilia Spiridonov	1171	2015/2016 season (70%)	0	199	175	0	0
38	RUS	Tatiana Volosozhar / Maxim Trankov	1078	2017/2018 season (100%)	0	0	0	0	0
38	RUS	Tatiana Volosozhar / Maxim Trankov	1078	2016/2017 season (100%)	0	0	0	0	0
38	RUS	Tatiana Volosozhar / Maxim Trankov	1078	2015/2016 season (70%)	588	280	0	210	0
39	CRO	Lana Petranovic / Antonio Souza-Kordeiru	1055	2017/2018 season (100%)	264	0	0	182	0
39	CRO	Lana Petranovic / Antonio Souza-Kordeiru	1055	2016/2017 season (100%)	192	0	0	219	198
39	CRO	Lana Petranovic / Antonio Souza-Kordeiru	1055	2015/2016 season (70%)	0	0	0	0	0
40	RUS	Daria Pavliuchenko / Denis Khodykin	1034	2017/2018 season (100%)	500	284	250	0	0
40	RUS	Daria Pavliuchenko / Denis Khodykin	1034	2016/2017 season (100%)	0	0	0	0	0
40	RUS	Daria Pavliuchenko / Denis Khodykin	1034	2015/2016 season (70%)	0	0	0	0	0
41	JPN	Miu Suzaki / Ryuichi Kihara	1033	2017/2018 season (100%)	402	191	0	0	0
41	JPN	Miu Suzaki / Ryuichi Kihara	1033	2016/2017 season (100%)	237	0	0	203	0
41	JPN	Miu Suzaki / Ryuichi Kihara	1033	2015/2016 season (70%)	0	0	0	0	0
42	GBR	Zoe Jones / Christopher Boyadji	1001	2017/2018 season (100%)	0	191	0	250	182
42	GBR	Zoe Jones / Christopher Boyadji	1001	2016/2017 season (100%)	214	0	0	164	0
42	GBR	Zoe Jones / Christopher Boyadji	1001	2015/2016 season (70%)	0	0	0	0	0
43	USA	Jessica Pfund / Joshua Santillan	961	2017/2018 season (100%)	0	0	0	219	198
43	USA	Jessica Pfund / Joshua Santillan	961	2016/2017 season (100%)	0	191	0	219	0
43	USA	Jessica Pfund / Joshua Santillan	961	2015/2016 season (70%)	0	134	0	0	0
44	ITA	Rebecca Ghilardi / Filippo Ambrosini	942	2017/2018 season (100%)	0	0	0	203	0
44	ITA	Rebecca Ghilardi / Filippo Ambrosini	942	2016/2017 season (100%)	293	0	0	243	203
44	ITA	Rebecca Ghilardi / Filippo Ambrosini	942	2015/2016 season (70%)	0	0	0	0	0
45	CAN	Camille Ruest / Andrew Wolfe	901	2017/2018 season (100%)	446	0	0	0	0
45	CAN	Camille Ruest / Andrew Wolfe	901	2016/2017 season (100%)	0	236	0	219	0
45	CAN	Camille Ruest / Andrew Wolfe	901	2015/2016 season (70%)	0	0	0	0	0
46	GER	Annika Hocke / Ruben Blommaert	897	2017/2018 season (100%)	402	0	0	270	225
46	GER	Annika Hocke / Ruben Blommaert	897	2016/2017 season (100%)	0	0	0	0	0
46	GER	Annika Hocke / Ruben Blommaert	897	2015/2016 season (70%)	0	0	0	0	0
47	CAN	Lori-Ann Matte / Thierry Ferland	880	2017/2018 season (100%)	215	120	0	0	0
47	CAN	Lori-Ann Matte / Thierry Ferland	880	2016/2017 season (100%)	215	182	148	0	0
47	CAN	Lori-Ann Matte / Thierry Ferland	880	2015/2016 season (70%)	0	0	0	0	0
48	RUS	Polina Kostiukovich / Dmitrii Ialin	848	2017/2018 season (100%)	450	250	148	0	0
48	RUS	Polina Kostiukovich / Dmitrii Ialin	848	2016/2017 season (100%)	0	0	0	0	0
48	RUS	Polina Kostiukovich / Dmitrii Ialin	848	2015/2016 season (70%)	0	0	0	0	0
49	ISR	Paige Conners / Evgeni Krasnopolski	803	2017/2018 season (100%)	362	0	0	243	198
49	ISR	Paige Conners / Evgeni Krasnopolski	803	2016/2017 season (100%)	0	0	0	0	0
49	ISR	Paige Conners / Evgeni Krasnopolski	803	2015/2016 season (70%)	0	0	0	0	0
50	KOR	Kyueun Kim / Alex Kang Chan Kam	791	2017/2018 season (100%)	0	0	0	203	198
50	KOR	Kyueun Kim / Alex Kang Chan Kam	791	2016/2017 season (100%)	192	0	0	198	0
50	KOR	Kyueun Kim / Alex Kang Chan Kam	791	2015/2016 season (70%)	0	0	0	0	0
51	USA	Deanna Stellato / Nathan Bartholomay	742	2017/2018 season (100%)	551	191	0	0	0
51	USA	Deanna Stellato / Nathan Bartholomay	742	2016/2017 season (100%)	0	0	0	0	0
51	USA	Deanna Stellato / Nathan Bartholomay	742	2015/2016 season (70%)	0	0	0	0	0
52	FRA	Camille Mendoza / Pavel Kovalev	701	2017/2018 season (100%)	0	0	0	198	0
52	FRA	Camille Mendoza / Pavel Kovalev	701	2016/2017 season (100%)	0	0	0	219	0
52	FRA	Camille Mendoza / Pavel Kovalev	701	2015/2016 season (70%)	0	0	0	142	142
53	SUI	Ioulia Chtchetinina / Mikhail Akulov	681	2017/2018 season (100%)	237	0	0	225	219
53	SUI	Ioulia Chtchetinina / Mikhail Akulov	681	2016/2017 season (100%)	0	0	0	0	0
53	SUI	Ioulia Chtchetinina / Mikhail Akulov	681	2015/2016 season (70%)	0	0	0	0	0
54	RUS	Anastasia Poluianova / Dmitry Sopot	675	2017/2018 season (100%)	0	225	207	243	0
54	RUS	Anastasia Poluianova / Dmitry Sopot	675	2016/2017 season (100%)	0	0	0	0	0
54	RUS	Anastasia Poluianova / Dmitry Sopot	675	2015/2016 season (70%)	0	0	0	0	0
55	JPN	Riku Miura / Shoya Ichihashi	660	2017/2018 season (100%)	325	97	97	0	0
55	JPN	Riku Miura / Shoya Ichihashi	660	2016/2017 season (100%)	141	0	0	0	0
55	JPN	Riku Miura / Shoya Ichihashi	660	2015/2016 season (70%)	0	0	0	0	0
56	USA	Audrey Lu / Misha Mitrofanov	656	2017/2018 season (100%)	328	164	164	0	0
56	USA	Audrey Lu / Misha Mitrofanov	656	2016/2017 season (100%)	0	0	0	0	0
56	USA	Audrey Lu / Misha Mitrofanov	656	2015/2016 season (70%)	0	0	0	0	0
57	GER	Talisa Thomalla / Robert Kunkel	640	2017/2018 season (100%)	266	120	97	0	0
57	GER	Talisa Thomalla / Robert Kunkel	640	2016/2017 season (100%)	157	0	0	0	0
57	GER	Talisa Thomalla / Robert Kunkel	640	2015/2016 season (70%)	0	0	0	0	0
58	AZE	Sofiya Karagodina / Semyon Stepanov	637	2017/2018 season (100%)	214	0	0	225	198
58	AZE	Sofiya Karagodina / Semyon Stepanov	637	2016/2017 season (100%)	0	0	0	0	0
58	AZE	Sofiya Karagodina / Semyon Stepanov	637	2015/2016 season (70%)	0	0	0	0	0
59	USA	Jessica Calalang / Zack Sidhu	572	2017/2018 season (100%)	0	0	0	0	0
59	USA	Jessica Calalang / Zack Sidhu	572	2016/2017 season (100%)	0	0	0	270	0
59	USA	Jessica Calalang / Zack Sidhu	572	2015/2016 season (70%)	0	149	0	153	0
60	RUS	Apollinariia Panfilova / Dmitry Rylov	565	2017/2018 season (100%)	0	315	250	0	0
60	RUS	Apollinariia Panfilova / Dmitry Rylov	565	2016/2017 season (100%)	0	0	0	0	0
60	RUS	Apollinariia Panfilova / Dmitry Rylov	565	2015/2016 season (70%)	0	0	0	0	0
61	RUS	Vera Bazarova / Andrei Deputat	562	2017/2018 season (100%)	0	0	0	0	0
61	RUS	Vera Bazarova / Andrei Deputat	562	2016/2017 season (100%)	0	0	0	0	0
61	RUS	Vera Bazarova / Andrei Deputat	562	2015/2016 season (70%)	0	204	183	175	0
62	CAN	Sydney Kolodziej / Maxime Deschamps	553	2017/2018 season (100%)	362	191	0	0	0
62	CAN	Sydney Kolodziej / Maxime Deschamps	553	2016/2017 season (100%)	0	0	0	0	0
62	CAN	Sydney Kolodziej / Maxime Deschamps	553	2015/2016 season (70%)	0	0	0	0	0
63	ESP	Laura Barquero / Aritz Maestu	543	2017/2018 season (100%)	293	0	0	250	0
63	ESP	Laura Barquero / Aritz Maestu	543	2016/2017 season (100%)	0	0	0	0	0
63	ESP	Laura Barquero / Aritz Maestu	543	2015/2016 season (70%)	0	0	0	0	0
64	CAN	Brittany Jones / Joshua Reagan	513	2017/2018 season (100%)	0	0	0	0	0
64	CAN	Brittany Jones / Joshua Reagan	513	2016/2017 season (100%)	0	213	0	300	0
64	CAN	Brittany Jones / Joshua Reagan	513	2015/2016 season (70%)	0	0	0	0	0
65	SUI	Alexandra Herbrikova / Nicolas Roulet	473	2017/2018 season (100%)	0	0	0	0	0
65	SUI	Alexandra Herbrikova / Nicolas Roulet	473	2016/2017 season (100%)	0	0	0	225	0
65	SUI	Alexandra Herbrikova / Nicolas Roulet	473	2015/2016 season (70%)	121	0	0	127	0
66	CAN	Bryn Hoffman / Bryce Chudak	421	2017/2018 season (100%)	0	0	0	0	0
66	CAN	Bryn Hoffman / Bryce Chudak	421	2016/2017 season (100%)	0	0	0	0	0
66	CAN	Bryn Hoffman / Bryce Chudak	421	2015/2016 season (70%)	167	127	127	0	0
66	FRA	Cleo Hamon / Denys Strekalin	421	2017/2018 season (100%)	174	120	0	0	0
66	FRA	Cleo Hamon / Denys Strekalin	421	2016/2017 season (100%)	127	0	0	0	0
66	FRA	Cleo Hamon / Denys Strekalin	421	2015/2016 season (70%)	0	0	0	0	0
68	RUS	Anastasia Mishina / Aleksandr Galiamov	405	2017/2018 season (100%)	405	0	0	0	0
68	RUS	Anastasia Mishina / Aleksandr Galiamov	405	2016/2017 season (100%)	0	0	0	0	0
68	RUS	Anastasia Mishina / Aleksandr Galiamov	405	2015/2016 season (70%)	0	0	0	0	0
69	USA	Joy Weinberg / Maximiliano Fernandez	387	2017/2018 season (100%)	0	0	0	0	0
69	USA	Joy Weinberg / Maximiliano Fernandez	387	2016/2017 season (100%)	0	0	0	0	0
69	USA	Joy Weinberg / Maximiliano Fernandez	387	2015/2016 season (70%)	136	158	93	0	0
70	ISR	Hailey Esther Kops / Artem Tsoglin	385	2017/2018 season (100%)	103	0	0	0	0
70	ISR	Hailey Esther Kops / Artem Tsoglin	385	2016/2017 season (100%)	174	108	0	0	0
70	ISR	Hailey Esther Kops / Artem Tsoglin	385	2015/2016 season (70%)	0	0	0	0	0
71	AUS	Paris Stephens / Matthew Dodds	362	2017/2018 season (100%)	0	0	0	0	0
71	AUS	Paris Stephens / Matthew Dodds	362	2016/2017 season (100%)	0	0	0	198	164
71	AUS	Paris Stephens / Matthew Dodds	362	2015/2016 season (70%)	0	0	0	0	0
72	USA	Sarah Feng / Tommy-Jo Nyman	359	2017/2018 season (100%)	239	120	0	0	0
72	USA	Sarah Feng / Tommy-Jo Nyman	359	2016/2017 season (100%)	0	0	0	0	0
72	USA	Sarah Feng / Tommy-Jo Nyman	359	2015/2016 season (70%)	0	0	0	0	0
73	ITA	Irma Caldara / Edoardo Caputo	358	2017/2018 season (100%)	0	108	0	0	0
73	ITA	Irma Caldara / Edoardo Caputo	358	2016/2017 season (100%)	114	0	0	0	0
73	ITA	Irma Caldara / Edoardo Caputo	358	2015/2016 season (70%)	0	68	68	0	0
74	USA	Nica Digerness / Danny Neudecker	342	2017/2018 season (100%)	0	0	0	0	0
74	USA	Nica Digerness / Danny Neudecker	342	2016/2017 season (100%)	194	148	0	0	0
74	USA	Nica Digerness / Danny Neudecker	342	2015/2016 season (70%)	0	0	0	0	0
75	CHN	Feiyao Tang / Yongchao Yang	339	2017/2018 season (100%)	157	182	0	0	0
75	CHN	Feiyao Tang / Yongchao Yang	339	2016/2017 season (100%)	0	0	0	0	0
75	CHN	Feiyao Tang / Yongchao Yang	339	2015/2016 season (70%)	0	0	0	0	0
76	USA	Laiken Lockley / Keenan Prochnow	328	2017/2018 season (100%)	0	164	164	0	0
76	USA	Laiken Lockley / Keenan Prochnow	328	2016/2017 season (100%)	0	0	0	0	0
76	USA	Laiken Lockley / Keenan Prochnow	328	2015/2016 season (70%)	0	0	0	0	0
77	RUS	Kseniia Akhanteva / Valerii Kolesov	281	2017/2018 season (100%)	0	148	0	0	0
77	RUS	Kseniia Akhanteva / Valerii Kolesov	281	2016/2017 season (100%)	0	133	0	0	0
77	RUS	Kseniia Akhanteva / Valerii Kolesov	281	2015/2016 season (70%)	0	0	0	0	0
78	RUS	Elena Ivanova / Tagir Khakimov	246	2017/2018 season (100%)	0	0	0	0	0
78	RUS	Elena Ivanova / Tagir Khakimov	246	2016/2017 season (100%)	0	0	0	0	0
78	RUS	Elena Ivanova / Tagir Khakimov	246	2015/2016 season (70%)	0	142	104	0	0
79	CHN	Jiaying Sui / Yunzhi Guo	241	2017/2018 season (100%)	0	133	108	0	0
79	CHN	Jiaying Sui / Yunzhi Guo	241	2016/2017 season (100%)	0	0	0	0	0
79	CHN	Jiaying Sui / Yunzhi Guo	241	2015/2016 season (70%)	0	0	0	0	0
79	CHN	Yuyao Zhang / Ziqi Jia	241	2017/2018 season (100%)	0	133	108	0	0
79	CHN	Yuyao Zhang / Ziqi Jia	241	2016/2017 season (100%)	0	0	0	0	0
79	CHN	Yuyao Zhang / Ziqi Jia	241	2015/2016 season (70%)	0	0	0	0	0
81	PRK	So Hyang Pak / Nam I Song	225	2017/2018 season (100%)	0	0	0	0	0
81	PRK	So Hyang Pak / Nam I Song	225	2016/2017 season (100%)	0	0	0	225	0
81	PRK	So Hyang Pak / Nam I Song	225	2015/2016 season (70%)	0	0	0	0	0
82	CHN	Mingyang Zhang / Bowen Song	213	2017/2018 season (100%)	0	213	0	0	0
82	CHN	Mingyang Zhang / Bowen Song	213	2016/2017 season (100%)	0	0	0	0	0
82	CHN	Mingyang Zhang / Bowen Song	213	2015/2016 season (70%)	0	0	0	0	0
83	CAN	Natasha Purich / Davin Portz	198	2017/2018 season (100%)	0	0	0	198	0
83	CAN	Natasha Purich / Davin Portz	198	2016/2017 season (100%)	0	0	0	0	0
83	CAN	Natasha Purich / Davin Portz	198	2015/2016 season (70%)	0	0	0	0	0
83	USA	Erika Smith / Aj Reiss	198	2017/2018 season (100%)	0	0	0	0	0
83	USA	Erika Smith / Aj Reiss	198	2016/2017 season (100%)	0	0	0	198	0
83	USA	Erika Smith / Aj Reiss	198	2015/2016 season (70%)	0	0	0	0	0
85	RUS	Bogdana Lukashevich / Alexander Stepanov	182	2017/2018 season (100%)	0	0	0	0	0
85	RUS	Bogdana Lukashevich / Alexander Stepanov	182	2016/2017 season (100%)	0	0	0	182	0
85	RUS	Bogdana Lukashevich / Alexander Stepanov	182	2015/2016 season (70%)	0	0	0	0	0
85	FIN	Liubov Efimenko / Matthew Penasse	182	2017/2018 season (100%)	0	0	0	182	0
85	FIN	Liubov Efimenko / Matthew Penasse	182	2016/2017 season (100%)	0	0	0	0	0
85	FIN	Liubov Efimenko / Matthew Penasse	182	2015/2016 season (70%)	0	0	0	0	0
87	FRA	Coline Keriven / Antoine Pierre	164	2017/2018 season (100%)	0	0	0	164	0
87	FRA	Coline Keriven / Antoine Pierre	164	2016/2017 season (100%)	0	0	0	0	0
87	FRA	Coline Keriven / Antoine Pierre	164	2015/2016 season (70%)	0	0	0	0	0
87	TUR	Cagla Demirsal / Berk Akalin	164	2017/2018 season (100%)	0	0	0	0	0
87	TUR	Cagla Demirsal / Berk Akalin	164	2016/2017 season (100%)	0	0	0	164	0
87	TUR	Cagla Demirsal / Berk Akalin	164	2015/2016 season (70%)	0	0	0	0	0
89	RUS	Daria Kvartalova / Alexei Sviatchenko	148	2017/2018 season (100%)	0	148	0	0	0
89	RUS	Daria Kvartalova / Alexei Sviatchenko	148	2016/2017 season (100%)	0	0	0	0	0
89	RUS	Daria Kvartalova / Alexei Sviatchenko	148	2015/2016 season (70%)	0	0	0	0	0
89	CAN	Chloe Panetta / Steven Lapointe	148	2017/2018 season (100%)	0	148	0	0	0
89	CAN	Chloe Panetta / Steven Lapointe	148	2016/2017 season (100%)	0	0	0	0	0
89	CAN	Chloe Panetta / Steven Lapointe	148	2015/2016 season (70%)	0	0	0	0	0
91	ESP	Isabella Gamez / Ton Consul	141	2017/2018 season (100%)	141	0	0	0	0
91	ESP	Isabella Gamez / Ton Consul	141	2016/2017 season (100%)	0	0	0	0	0
91	ESP	Isabella Gamez / Ton Consul	141	2015/2016 season (70%)	0	0	0	0	0
92	CAN	Chloe Choinard / Mathieu Ostiguy	133	2017/2018 season (100%)	0	133	0	0	0
92	CAN	Chloe Choinard / Mathieu Ostiguy	133	2016/2017 season (100%)	0	0	0	0	0
92	CAN	Chloe Choinard / Mathieu Ostiguy	133	2015/2016 season (70%)	0	0	0	0	0
92	USA	Elizabeth Vasilevna Kopmar / Jonah Barrett	133	2017/2018 season (100%)	0	133	0	0	0
92	USA	Elizabeth Vasilevna Kopmar / Jonah Barrett	133	2016/2017 season (100%)	0	0	0	0	0
92	USA	Elizabeth Vasilevna Kopmar / Jonah Barrett	133	2015/2016 season (70%)	0	0	0	0	0
92	USA	Gabriella Marvaldi / Daniel Villeneuve	133	2017/2018 season (100%)	0	0	0	0	0
92	USA	Gabriella Marvaldi / Daniel Villeneuve	133	2016/2017 season (100%)	0	133	0	0	0
92	USA	Gabriella Marvaldi / Daniel Villeneuve	133	2015/2016 season (70%)	0	0	0	0	0
95	UKR	Sofiia Nesterova / Artem Darenskyi	127	2017/2018 season (100%)	127	0	0	0	0
95	UKR	Sofiia Nesterova / Artem Darenskyi	127	2016/2017 season (100%)	0	0	0	0	0
95	UKR	Sofiia Nesterova / Artem Darenskyi	127	2015/2016 season (70%)	0	0	0	0	0
96	CZE	Edita Hornakova / Radek Jakubka	114	2017/2018 season (100%)	114	0	0	0	0
96	CZE	Edita Hornakova / Radek Jakubka	114	2016/2017 season (100%)	0	0	0	0	0
96	CZE	Edita Hornakova / Radek Jakubka	114	2015/2016 season (70%)	0	0	0	0	0
97	CAN	Jamie Knoblauch / Cody Wong	97	2017/2018 season (100%)	0	0	0	0	0
97	CAN	Jamie Knoblauch / Cody Wong	97	2016/2017 season (100%)	0	97	0	0	0
97	CAN	Jamie Knoblauch / Cody Wong	97	2015/2016 season (70%)	0	0	0	0	0

==== Ice dance (144 couples) ====
As of 24 March 2018

Rank	Nation	Couple	Points	Season	ISU Championships or Olympics	(Junior) Grand Prix and Final		Selected International Competition	
Rank	Nation	Couple	Points	Season	Best	Best	2nd Best	Best	2nd Best
1	CAN	Tessa Virtue / Scott Moir	5320	2017/2018 season (100%)	1200	720	400	300	0
1	CAN	Tessa Virtue / Scott Moir	5320	2016/2017 season (100%)	1200	800	400	300	0
1	CAN	Tessa Virtue / Scott Moir	5320	2015/2016 season (70%)	0	0	0	0	0
2	FRA	Gabriella Papadakis / Guillaume Cizeron	4900	2017/2018 season (100%)	1200	800	400	300	0
2	FRA	Gabriella Papadakis / Guillaume Cizeron	4900	2016/2017 season (100%)	1080	720	400	0	0
2	FRA	Gabriella Papadakis / Guillaume Cizeron	4900	2015/2016 season (70%)	840	0	0	0	0
3	USA	Madison Hubbell / Zachary Donohue	4600	2017/2018 season (100%)	1080	583	360	300	0
3	USA	Madison Hubbell / Zachary Donohue	4600	2016/2017 season (100%)	612	525	360	300	270
3	USA	Madison Hubbell / Zachary Donohue	4600	2015/2016 season (70%)	496	330	280	210	0
4	RUS	Ekaterina Bobrova / Dmitri Soloviev	4485	2017/2018 season (100%)	787	360	324	300	300
4	RUS	Ekaterina Bobrova / Dmitri Soloviev	4485	2016/2017 season (100%)	787	583	400	300	300
4	RUS	Ekaterina Bobrova / Dmitri Soloviev	4485	2015/2016 season (70%)	476	368	252	0	0
5	ITA	Anna Cappellini / Luca Lanotte	4266	2017/2018 season (100%)	875	472	360	300	0
5	ITA	Anna Cappellini / Luca Lanotte	4266	2016/2017 season (100%)	756	324	292	300	250
5	ITA	Anna Cappellini / Luca Lanotte	4266	2015/2016 season (70%)	613	454	280	175	0
6	USA	Maia Shibutani / Alex Shibutani	4218	2017/2018 season (100%)	972	648	400	0	0
6	USA	Maia Shibutani / Alex Shibutani	4218	2016/2017 season (100%)	972	648	400	0	0
6	USA	Maia Shibutani / Alex Shibutani	4218	2015/2016 season (70%)	756	408	280	170	0
7	USA	Madison Chock / Evan Bates	4078	2017/2018 season (100%)	787	525	360	0	0
7	USA	Madison Chock / Evan Bates	4078	2016/2017 season (100%)	680	472	360	270	270
7	USA	Madison Chock / Evan Bates	4078	2015/2016 season (70%)	680	504	280	210	0
8	CAN	Kaitlyn Weaver / Andrew Poje	3931	2017/2018 season (100%)	972	360	292	270	0
8	CAN	Kaitlyn Weaver / Andrew Poje	3931	2016/2017 season (100%)	875	360	324	0	0
8	CAN	Kaitlyn Weaver / Andrew Poje	3931	2015/2016 season (70%)	551	560	280	210	0
9	ITA	Charlene Guignard / Marco Fabbri	3325	2017/2018 season (100%)	551	262	262	300	270
9	ITA	Charlene Guignard / Marco Fabbri	3325	2016/2017 season (100%)	496	292	292	300	300
9	ITA	Charlene Guignard / Marco Fabbri	3325	2015/2016 season (70%)	326	204	204	210	210
10	CAN	Piper Gilles / Paul Poirier	3211	2017/2018 season (100%)	709	292	292	243	0
10	CAN	Piper Gilles / Paul Poirier	3211	2016/2017 season (100%)	574	324	324	243	0
10	CAN	Piper Gilles / Paul Poirier	3211	2015/2016 season (70%)	402	252	227	210	0
11	RUS	Alexandra Stepanova / Ivan Bukin	3035	2017/2018 season (100%)	680	324	324	270	0
11	RUS	Alexandra Stepanova / Ivan Bukin	3035	2016/2017 season (100%)	551	324	262	300	0
11	RUS	Alexandra Stepanova / Ivan Bukin	3035	2015/2016 season (70%)	386	227	204	0	0
12	USA	Kaitlin Hawayek / Jean-Luc Baker	2975	2017/2018 season (100%)	840	292	262	270	243
12	USA	Kaitlin Hawayek / Jean-Luc Baker	2975	2016/2017 season (100%)	0	292	236	270	270
12	USA	Kaitlin Hawayek / Jean-Luc Baker	2975	2015/2016 season (70%)	0	204	0	189	153
13	CAN	Laurence Fournier Beaudry / Nikolaj Sørensen	2603	2017/2018 season (100%)	362	262	0	243	219
13	CAN	Laurence Fournier Beaudry / Nikolaj Sørensen	2603	2016/2017 season (100%)	446	213	213	243	219
13	CAN	Laurence Fournier Beaudry / Nikolaj Sørensen	2603	2015/2016 season (70%)	253	183	149	189	170
14	JPN	Kana Muramoto / Chris Reed	2581	2017/2018 season (100%)	680	213	0	270	243
14	JPN	Kana Muramoto / Chris Reed	2581	2016/2017 season (100%)	362	191	0	270	203
14	JPN	Kana Muramoto / Chris Reed	2581	2015/2016 season (70%)	312	149	0	158	0
15	USA	Lorraine McNamara / Quinn Carpenter	2523	2017/2018 season (100%)	612	262	0	270	250
15	USA	Lorraine McNamara / Quinn Carpenter	2523	2016/2017 season (100%)	266	284	250	0	0
15	USA	Lorraine McNamara / Quinn Carpenter	2523	2015/2016 season (70%)	350	245	175	0	0
16	USA	Rachel Parsons / Michael Parsons	2503	2017/2018 season (100%)	496	213	0	270	225
16	USA	Rachel Parsons / Michael Parsons	2503	2016/2017 season (100%)	500	350	250	0	0
16	USA	Rachel Parsons / Michael Parsons	2503	2015/2016 season (70%)	315	199	175	0	0
17	POL	Natalia Kaliszek / Maksym Spodyriev	2412	2017/2018 season (100%)	325	191	0	300	250
17	POL	Natalia Kaliszek / Maksym Spodyriev	2412	2016/2017 season (100%)	402	262	213	250	219
17	POL	Natalia Kaliszek / Maksym Spodyriev	2412	2015/2016 season (70%)	205	0	0	189	175
18	GBR	Penny Coomes / Nicholas Buckland	2407	2017/2018 season (100%)	446	213	0	300	250
18	GBR	Penny Coomes / Nicholas Buckland	2407	2016/2017 season (100%)	0	0	0	0	0
18	GBR	Penny Coomes / Nicholas Buckland	2407	2015/2016 season (70%)	447	204	183	189	175
19	RUS	Tiffani Zagorski / Jonathan Guerreiro	2325	2017/2018 season (100%)	574	292	236	270	178
19	RUS	Tiffani Zagorski / Jonathan Guerreiro	2325	2016/2017 season (100%)	0	262	0	270	243
19	RUS	Tiffani Zagorski / Jonathan Guerreiro	2325	2015/2016 season (70%)	0	0	0	175	0
20	FRA	Marie-Jade Lauriault / Romain Le Gac	2286	2017/2018 season (100%)	339	191	191	203	178
20	FRA	Marie-Jade Lauriault / Romain Le Gac	2286	2016/2017 season (100%)	264	236	236	250	198
20	FRA	Marie-Jade Lauriault / Romain Le Gac	2286	2015/2016 season (70%)	167	175	161	0	0
21	ISR	Isabella Tobias / Ilia Tkachenko	2262	2017/2018 season (100%)	0	0	0	0	0
21	ISR	Isabella Tobias / Ilia Tkachenko	2262	2016/2017 season (100%)	612	262	236	270	219
21	ISR	Isabella Tobias / Ilia Tkachenko	2262	2015/2016 season (70%)	264	0	0	210	189
22	UKR	Alexandra Nazarova / Maxim Nikitin	2199	2017/2018 season (100%)	293	236	0	250	243
22	UKR	Alexandra Nazarova / Maxim Nikitin	2199	2016/2017 season (100%)	362	213	0	250	203
22	UKR	Alexandra Nazarova / Maxim Nikitin	2199	2015/2016 season (70%)	126	149	0	153	125
23	RUS	Victoria Sinitsina / Nikita Katsalapov	2166	2017/2018 season (100%)	0	324	292	243	0
23	RUS	Victoria Sinitsina / Nikita Katsalapov	2166	2016/2017 season (100%)	325	292	262	0	0
23	RUS	Victoria Sinitsina / Nikita Katsalapov	2166	2015/2016 season (70%)	428	252	227	0	0
24	USA	Elliana Pogrebinsky / Alex Benoit	2086	2017/2018 season (100%)	0	213	213	243	219
24	USA	Elliana Pogrebinsky / Alex Benoit	2086	2016/2017 season (100%)	0	236	213	250	243
24	USA	Elliana Pogrebinsky / Alex Benoit	2086	2015/2016 season (70%)	256	142	127	0	0
25	RUS	Alla Loboda / Pavel Drozd	2052	2017/2018 season (100%)	0	262	0	270	0
25	RUS	Alla Loboda / Pavel Drozd	2052	2016/2017 season (100%)	450	315	250	0	0
25	RUS	Alla Loboda / Pavel Drozd	2052	2015/2016 season (70%)	284	221	175	0	0
26	CHN	Shiyue Wang / Xinyu Liu	2050	2017/2018 season (100%)	551	236	191	225	0
26	CHN	Shiyue Wang / Xinyu Liu	2050	2016/2017 season (100%)	446	236	0	0	0
26	CHN	Shiyue Wang / Xinyu Liu	2050	2015/2016 season (70%)	253	165	134	0	0
27	USA	Christina Carreira / Anthony Ponomarenko	1900	2017/2018 season (100%)	450	315	250	0	0
27	USA	Christina Carreira / Anthony Ponomarenko	1900	2016/2017 season (100%)	405	255	225	0	0
27	USA	Christina Carreira / Anthony Ponomarenko	1900	2015/2016 season (70%)	0	158	127	0	0
28	RUS	Anastasia Skoptcova / Kirill Aleshin	1856	2017/2018 season (100%)	500	350	250	0	0
28	RUS	Anastasia Skoptcova / Kirill Aleshin	1856	2016/2017 season (100%)	328	225	203	0	0
28	RUS	Anastasia Skoptcova / Kirill Aleshin	1856	2015/2016 season (70%)	0	158	145	0	0
29	TUR	Alisa Agafonova / Alper Uçar	1818	2017/2018 season (100%)	237	0	0	270	178
29	TUR	Alisa Agafonova / Alper Uçar	1818	2016/2017 season (100%)	293	191	0	243	225
29	TUR	Alisa Agafonova / Alper Uçar	1818	2015/2016 season (70%)	185	149	0	210	175
30	FRA	Angelique Abachkina / Louis Thauron	1712	2017/2018 season (100%)	173	236	191	198	182
30	FRA	Angelique Abachkina / Louis Thauron	1712	2016/2017 season (100%)	239	250	230	0	0
30	FRA	Angelique Abachkina / Louis Thauron	1712	2015/2016 season (70%)	186	158	127	0	0
31	ESP	Olivia Smart / Adrian Diaz	1705	2017/2018 season (100%)	377	236	0	219	198
31	ESP	Olivia Smart / Adrian Diaz	1705	2016/2017 season (100%)	200	0	0	250	225
31	ESP	Olivia Smart / Adrian Diaz	1705	2015/2016 season (70%)	0	0	0	0	0
32	KOR	Yura Min / Alexander Gamelin	1687	2017/2018 season (100%)	446	0	0	219	219
32	KOR	Yura Min / Alexander Gamelin	1687	2016/2017 season (100%)	402	0	0	203	198
32	KOR	Yura Min / Alexander Gamelin	1687	2015/2016 season (70%)	281	0	0	139	127
33	ESP	Sara Hurtado / Kirill Khaliavin	1583	2017/2018 season (100%)	402	0	0	250	219
33	ESP	Sara Hurtado / Kirill Khaliavin	1583	2016/2017 season (100%)	237	0	0	250	225
33	ESP	Sara Hurtado / Kirill Khaliavin	1583	2015/2016 season (70%)	0	0	0	0	0
34	GER	Kavita Lorenz / Joti Polizoakis	1543	2017/2018 season (100%)	247	191	0	243	198
34	GER	Kavita Lorenz / Joti Polizoakis	1543	2016/2017 season (100%)	214	0	0	225	225
34	GER	Kavita Lorenz / Joti Polizoakis	1543	2015/2016 season (70%)	155	0	0	175	153
35	CAN	Marjorie Lajoie / Zachary Lagha	1499	2017/2018 season (100%)	365	250	225	0	0
35	CAN	Marjorie Lajoie / Zachary Lagha	1499	2016/2017 season (100%)	295	182	182	0	0
35	CAN	Marjorie Lajoie / Zachary Lagha	1499	2015/2016 season (70%)	99	93	0	0	0
36	RUS	Anastasia Shpilevaya / Grigory Smirnov	1397	2017/2018 season (100%)	0	225	0	0	0
36	RUS	Anastasia Shpilevaya / Grigory Smirnov	1397	2016/2017 season (100%)	365	225	225	0	0
36	RUS	Anastasia Shpilevaya / Grigory Smirnov	1397	2015/2016 season (70%)	230	127	0	0	0
37	CAN	Carolane Soucisse / Shane Firus	1386	2017/2018 season (100%)	756	213	0	219	198
37	CAN	Carolane Soucisse / Shane Firus	1386	2016/2017 season (100%)	0	0	0	0	0
37	CAN	Carolane Soucisse / Shane Firus	1386	2015/2016 season (70%)	0	0	0	0	0
38	RUS	Arina Ushakova / Maxim Nekrasov	1291	2017/2018 season (100%)	405	250	230	0	0
38	RUS	Arina Ushakova / Maxim Nekrasov	1291	2016/2017 season (100%)	0	203	203	0	0
38	RUS	Arina Ushakova / Maxim Nekrasov	1291	2015/2016 season (70%)	0	0	0	0	0
39	FIN	Cecilia Törn / Jussiville Partanen	1221	2017/2018 season (100%)	192	0	0	250	198
39	FIN	Cecilia Törn / Jussiville Partanen	1221	2016/2017 season (100%)	156	0	0	243	182
39	FIN	Cecilia Törn / Jussiville Partanen	1221	2015/2016 season (70%)	140	0	0	175	170
40	RUS	Sofia Shevchenko / Igor Eremenko	1200	2017/2018 season (100%)	328	255	250	0	0
40	RUS	Sofia Shevchenko / Igor Eremenko	1200	2016/2017 season (100%)	0	203	164	0	0
40	RUS	Sofia Shevchenko / Igor Eremenko	1200	2015/2016 season (70%)	0	142	142	0	0
41	GBR	Lilah Fear / Lewis Gibson	1162	2017/2018 season (100%)	0	0	0	250	225
41	GBR	Lilah Fear / Lewis Gibson	1162	2016/2017 season (100%)	192	0	0	270	225
41	GBR	Lilah Fear / Lewis Gibson	1162	2015/2016 season (70%)	0	0	0	0	0
42	UKR	Darya Popova / Volodymyr Byelikov	1121	2017/2018 season (100%)	174	164	148	225	0
42	UKR	Darya Popova / Volodymyr Byelikov	1121	2016/2017 season (100%)	157	133	120	0	0
42	UKR	Darya Popova / Volodymyr Byelikov	1121	2015/2016 season (70%)	0	0	0	0	0
43	CZE	Cortney Mansourova / Michal Ceska	1118	2017/2018 season (100%)	0	0	0	198	182
43	CZE	Cortney Mansourova / Michal Ceska	1118	2016/2017 season (100%)	0	191	0	203	178
43	CZE	Cortney Mansourova / Michal Ceska	1118	2015/2016 season (70%)	166	0	0	127	125
44	BLR	Viktoria Kavaliova / Yurii Bieliaiev	1071	2017/2018 season (100%)	113	0	0	182	0
44	BLR	Viktoria Kavaliova / Yurii Bieliaiev	1071	2016/2017 season (100%)	113	0	0	164	0
44	BLR	Viktoria Kavaliova / Yurii Bieliaiev	1071	2015/2016 season (70%)	121	149	0	189	153
45	SVK	Lucie Myslivečková / Lukáš Csölley	1006	2017/2018 season (100%)	162	0	0	178	0
45	SVK	Lucie Myslivečková / Lukáš Csölley	1006	2016/2017 season (100%)	173	0	0	250	243
45	SVK	Lucie Myslivečková / Lukáš Csölley	1006	2015/2016 season (70%)	0	0	0	0	0
46	ITA	Jasmine Tessari / Francesco Fioretti	991	2017/2018 season (100%)	140	0	0	225	225
46	ITA	Jasmine Tessari / Francesco Fioretti	991	2016/2017 season (100%)	0	0	0	203	198
46	ITA	Jasmine Tessari / Francesco Fioretti	991	2015/2016 season (70%)	0	0	0	0	0
47	RUS	Betina Popova / Sergey Mozgov	977	2017/2018 season (100%)	0	236	0	300	243
47	RUS	Betina Popova / Sergey Mozgov	977	2016/2017 season (100%)	0	0	0	198	0
47	RUS	Betina Popova / Sergey Mozgov	977	2015/2016 season (70%)	0	0	0	0	0
48	RUS	Sofia Polishchuk / Alexander Vakhnov	962	2017/2018 season (100%)	0	284	250	0	0
48	RUS	Sofia Polishchuk / Alexander Vakhnov	962	2016/2017 season (100%)	0	225	203	0	0
48	RUS	Sofia Polishchuk / Alexander Vakhnov	962	2015/2016 season (70%)	0	142	115	0	0
49	ARM	Tina Garabedian / Simon Proulx Senecal	956	2017/2018 season (100%)	126	0	0	178	0
49	ARM	Tina Garabedian / Simon Proulx Senecal	956	2016/2017 season (100%)	126	0	0	198	0
49	ARM	Tina Garabedian / Simon Proulx Senecal	956	2015/2016 season (70%)	98	0	0	170	158
50	FRA	Natacha Lagouge / Corentin Rahier	946	2017/2018 season (100%)	239	203	0	0	0
50	FRA	Natacha Lagouge / Corentin Rahier	946	2016/2017 season (100%)	174	182	148	0	0
50	FRA	Natacha Lagouge / Corentin Rahier	946	2015/2016 season (70%)	0	0	0	0	0
51	USA	Chloe Lewis / Logan Bye	945	2017/2018 season (100%)	266	164	164	0	0
51	USA	Chloe Lewis / Logan Bye	945	2016/2017 season (100%)	0	203	148	0	0
51	USA	Chloe Lewis / Logan Bye	945	2015/2016 season (70%)	0	115	115	0	0
52	CZE	Nicole Kuzmichova / Alexandr Sinicyn	930	2017/2018 season (100%)	0	0	0	0	0
52	CZE	Nicole Kuzmichova / Alexandr Sinicyn	930	2016/2017 season (100%)	215	225	182	0	0
52	CZE	Nicole Kuzmichova / Alexandr Sinicyn	930	2015/2016 season (70%)	122	93	93	0	0
53	GER	Katharina Müller / Tim Dieck	923	2017/2018 season (100%)	0	0	0	250	198
53	GER	Katharina Müller / Tim Dieck	923	2016/2017 season (100%)	0	0	0	250	225
53	GER	Katharina Müller / Tim Dieck	923	2015/2016 season (70%)	0	0	0	142	142
54	RUS	Sofia Evdokimova / Egor Bazin	882	2017/2018 season (100%)	0	0	0	219	203
54	RUS	Sofia Evdokimova / Egor Bazin	882	2016/2017 season (100%)	0	0	0	203	0
54	RUS	Sofia Evdokimova / Egor Bazin	882	2015/2016 season (70%)	0	142	115	0	0
55	JPN	Emi Hirai / Marien De La Asuncion	851	2017/2018 season (100%)	0	0	0	0	0
55	JPN	Emi Hirai / Marien De La Asuncion	851	2016/2017 season (100%)	264	0	0	0	0
55	JPN	Emi Hirai / Marien De La Asuncion	851	2015/2016 season (70%)	185	134	0	153	115
56	GER	Ria Schwendinger / Valentin Wunderlich	845	2017/2018 season (100%)	194	120	0	0	0
56	GER	Ria Schwendinger / Valentin Wunderlich	845	2016/2017 season (100%)	194	133	120	0	0
56	GER	Ria Schwendinger / Valentin Wunderlich	845	2015/2016 season (70%)	72	84	0	0	0
57	JPN	Rikako Fukase / Aru Tateno	843	2017/2018 season (100%)	293	0	0	164	0
57	JPN	Rikako Fukase / Aru Tateno	843	2016/2017 season (100%)	141	148	97	0	0
57	JPN	Rikako Fukase / Aru Tateno	843	2015/2016 season (70%)	53	0	0	0	0
58	CAN	Ashlynne Stairs / Lee Royer	770	2017/2018 season (100%)	0	182	164	0	0
58	CAN	Ashlynne Stairs / Lee Royer	770	2016/2017 season (100%)	127	164	133	0	0
58	CAN	Ashlynne Stairs / Lee Royer	770	2015/2016 season (70%)	0	84	0	0	0
59	CHN	Linshu Song / Zhuoming Sun	748	2017/2018 season (100%)	264	0	0	0	0
59	CHN	Linshu Song / Zhuoming Sun	748	2016/2017 season (100%)	293	191	0	0	0
59	CHN	Linshu Song / Zhuoming Sun	748	2015/2016 season (70%)	0	0	0	0	0
60	USA	Gordon Green / Gordon Green	701	2017/2018 season (100%)	295	203	203	0	0
60	USA	Gordon Green / Gordon Green	701	2016/2017 season (100%)	0	0	0	0	0
60	USA	Gordon Green / Gordon Green	701	2015/2016 season (70%)	0	0	0	0	0
61	CAN	Alicia Fabbri / Claudio Pietrantonio	697	2017/2018 season (100%)	0	203	164	0	0
61	CAN	Alicia Fabbri / Claudio Pietrantonio	697	2016/2017 season (100%)	0	182	148	0	0
61	CAN	Alicia Fabbri / Claudio Pietrantonio	697	2015/2016 season (70%)	0	0	0	0	0
62	KOR	Hojung Lee / Richard Kang In Kam	685	2017/2018 season (100%)	0	0	0	0	0
62	KOR	Hojung Lee / Richard Kang In Kam	685	2016/2017 season (100%)	237	0	0	0	0
62	KOR	Hojung Lee / Richard Kang In Kam	685	2015/2016 season (70%)	228	127	93	0	0
63	CAN	Elisabeth Paradis / Francois-Xavier Ouellette	651	2017/2018 season (100%)	0	0	0	0	0
63	CAN	Elisabeth Paradis / Francois-Xavier Ouellette	651	2016/2017 season (100%)	0	0	0	0	0
63	CAN	Elisabeth Paradis / Francois-Xavier Ouellette	651	2015/2016 season (70%)	347	134	0	170	0
64	LAT	Olga Jakushina / Andrey Nevskiy	643	2017/2018 season (100%)	0	0	0	0	0
64	LAT	Olga Jakushina / Andrey Nevskiy	643	2016/2017 season (100%)	0	0	0	182	178
64	LAT	Olga Jakushina / Andrey Nevskiy	643	2015/2016 season (70%)	0	0	0	158	125
65	HUN	Anna Yanovskaya / Ádám Lukács	642	2017/2018 season (100%)	214	0	0	225	203
65	HUN	Anna Yanovskaya / Ádám Lukács	642	2016/2017 season (100%)	0	0	0	0	0
65	HUN	Anna Yanovskaya / Ádám Lukács	642	2015/2016 season (70%)	0	0	0	0	0
66	USA	Julia Biechler / Damian Dodge	640	2017/2018 season (100%)	0	0	0	0	0
66	USA	Julia Biechler / Damian Dodge	640	2016/2017 season (100%)	0	0	0	219	164
66	USA	Julia Biechler / Damian Dodge	640	2015/2016 season (70%)	0	142	115	0	0
67	UKR	Maria Golubtsova / Kirill Belobrov	626	2017/2018 season (100%)	0	148	108	0	0
67	UKR	Maria Golubtsova / Kirill Belobrov	626	2016/2017 season (100%)	0	164	148	0	0
67	UKR	Maria Golubtsova / Kirill Belobrov	626	2015/2016 season (70%)	58	93	68	0	0
68	GER	Shari Koch / Christian Nüchtern	588	2017/2018 season (100%)	0	0	0	203	203
68	GER	Shari Koch / Christian Nüchtern	588	2016/2017 season (100%)	0	0	0	182	0
68	GER	Shari Koch / Christian Nüchtern	588	2015/2016 season (70%)	0	0	0	0	0
69	FRA	Julia Wagret / Mathieu Couyras	586	2017/2018 season (100%)	0	120	120	0	0
69	FRA	Julia Wagret / Mathieu Couyras	586	2016/2017 season (100%)	0	182	164	0	0
69	FRA	Julia Wagret / Mathieu Couyras	586	2015/2016 season (70%)	0	0	0	0	0
70	BLR	Emiliya Kalehanova / Uladzislau Palkhouski	565	2017/2018 season (100%)	0	148	133	0	0
70	BLR	Emiliya Kalehanova / Uladzislau Palkhouski	565	2016/2017 season (100%)	103	97	0	0	0
70	BLR	Emiliya Kalehanova / Uladzislau Palkhouski	565	2015/2016 season (70%)	0	84	68	0	0
71	USA	Eliana Gropman / Ian Somerville	540	2017/2018 season (100%)	0	182	182	0	0
71	USA	Eliana Gropman / Ian Somerville	540	2016/2017 season (100%)	0	108	0	0	0
71	USA	Eliana Gropman / Ian Somerville	540	2015/2016 season (70%)	0	68	0	0	0
72	FRA	Lorenza Alessandrini / Pierre Souquet	528	2017/2018 season (100%)	0	0	0	0	0
72	FRA	Lorenza Alessandrini / Pierre Souquet	528	2016/2017 season (100%)	0	0	0	164	0
72	FRA	Lorenza Alessandrini / Pierre Souquet	528	2015/2016 season (70%)	79	0	0	158	127
73	JPN	Misato Komatsubara / Tim Koleto	507	2017/2018 season (100%)	325	0	0	182	0
73	JPN	Misato Komatsubara / Tim Koleto	507	2016/2017 season (100%)	0	0	0	0	0
73	JPN	Misato Komatsubara / Tim Koleto	507	2015/2016 season (70%)	0	0	0	0	0
74	LTU	Allison Reed / Saulius Ambrulevičius	504	2017/2018 season (100%)	162	0	0	178	164
74	LTU	Allison Reed / Saulius Ambrulevičius	504	2016/2017 season (100%)	0	0	0	0	0
74	LTU	Allison Reed / Saulius Ambrulevičius	504	2015/2016 season (70%)	0	0	0	0	0
74	USA	Karina Manta / Joseph Johnson	504	2017/2018 season (100%)	0	0	0	164	0
74	USA	Karina Manta / Joseph Johnson	504	2016/2017 season (100%)	0	0	0	198	0
74	USA	Karina Manta / Joseph Johnson	504	2015/2016 season (70%)	0	0	0	142	0
76	AUS	Matilda Friend / William Badaoui	503	2017/2018 season (100%)	214	0	0	0	0
76	AUS	Matilda Friend / William Badaoui	503	2016/2017 season (100%)	192	97	0	0	0
76	AUS	Matilda Friend / William Badaoui	503	2015/2016 season (70%)	121	0	0	0	0
77	CAN	Haley Sales / Nikolas Wamsteeker	466	2017/2018 season (100%)	362	0	0	0	0
77	CAN	Haley Sales / Nikolas Wamsteeker	466	2016/2017 season (100%)	0	0	0	0	0
77	CAN	Haley Sales / Nikolas Wamsteeker	466	2015/2016 season (70%)	0	104	0	0	0
78	FRA	Loicia Demougeot / Theo Le Mercier	451	2017/2018 season (100%)	114	120	97	0	0
78	FRA	Loicia Demougeot / Theo Le Mercier	451	2016/2017 season (100%)	0	120	0	0	0
78	FRA	Loicia Demougeot / Theo Le Mercier	451	2015/2016 season (70%)	0	0	0	0	0
79	FRA	Sarah Marine Rouffanche / Geoffrey Brissaud	449	2017/2018 season (100%)	0	0	0	0	0
79	FRA	Sarah Marine Rouffanche / Geoffrey Brissaud	449	2016/2017 season (100%)	0	148	133	0	0
79	FRA	Sarah Marine Rouffanche / Geoffrey Brissaud	449	2015/2016 season (70%)	0	84	84	0	0
80	RUS	Ksenia Konkina / Grigory Yakushev	428	2017/2018 season (100%)	0	225	203	0	0
80	RUS	Ksenia Konkina / Grigory Yakushev	428	2016/2017 season (100%)	0	0	0	0	0
80	RUS	Ksenia Konkina / Grigory Yakushev	428	2015/2016 season (70%)	0	0	0	0	0
80	RUS	Elizaveta Khudaiberdieva / Nikita Nazarov	428	2017/2018 season (100%)	0	225	203	0	0
80	RUS	Elizaveta Khudaiberdieva / Nikita Nazarov	428	2016/2017 season (100%)	0	0	0	0	0
80	RUS	Elizaveta Khudaiberdieva / Nikita Nazarov	428	2015/2016 season (70%)	0	0	0	0	0
82	ISR	Shira Ichilov / Vadim Davidovich	423	2017/2018 season (100%)	93	182	148	0	0
82	ISR	Shira Ichilov / Vadim Davidovich	423	2016/2017 season (100%)	0	0	0	0	0
82	ISR	Shira Ichilov / Vadim Davidovich	423	2015/2016 season (70%)	0	0	0	0	0
83	ITA	Chiara Calderone / Pietro Papetti	422	2017/2018 season (100%)	141	148	133	0	0
83	ITA	Chiara Calderone / Pietro Papetti	422	2016/2017 season (100%)	0	0	0	0	0
83	ITA	Chiara Calderone / Pietro Papetti	422	2015/2016 season (70%)	0	0	0	0	0
84	CAN	Sarah Arnold / Thomas Williams	402	2017/2018 season (100%)	402	0	0	0	0
84	CAN	Sarah Arnold / Thomas Williams	402	2016/2017 season (100%)	0	0	0	0	0
84	CAN	Sarah Arnold / Thomas Williams	402	2015/2016 season (70%)	0	0	0	0	0
85	POL	Justyna Plutowska / Jeremie Flemin	401	2017/2018 season (100%)	0	0	0	0	0
85	POL	Justyna Plutowska / Jeremie Flemin	401	2016/2017 season (100%)	0	0	0	219	182
85	POL	Justyna Plutowska / Jeremie Flemin	401	2015/2016 season (70%)	0	0	0	0	0
86	AZE	Vavara Ogloblina / Mikhail Zhirnov	385	2017/2018 season (100%)	0	0	0	0	0
86	AZE	Vavara Ogloblina / Mikhail Zhirnov	385	2016/2017 season (100%)	0	0	0	203	182
86	AZE	Vavara Ogloblina / Mikhail Zhirnov	385	2015/2016 season (70%)	0	0	0	0	0
87	ESP	Celia Robledo / Luis Fenero	367	2017/2018 season (100%)	0	0	0	0	0
87	ESP	Celia Robledo / Luis Fenero	367	2016/2017 season (100%)	0	0	0	164	0
87	ESP	Celia Robledo / Luis Fenero	367	2015/2016 season (70%)	88	0	0	115	0
88	RUS	Evgeniia Lopareva / Alexey Karpushov	364	2017/2018 season (100%)	0	182	0	0	0
88	RUS	Evgeniia Lopareva / Alexey Karpushov	364	2016/2017 season (100%)	0	182	0	0	0
88	RUS	Evgeniia Lopareva / Alexey Karpushov	364	2015/2016 season (70%)	0	0	0	0	0
89	USA	Emma Gunter / Caleb Wein	363	2017/2018 season (100%)	0	133	97	0	0
89	USA	Emma Gunter / Caleb Wein	363	2016/2017 season (100%)	0	133	0	0	0
89	USA	Emma Gunter / Caleb Wein	363	2015/2016 season (70%)	0	0	0	0	0
90	GER	Jennifer Urban / Benjamin Steffan	360	2017/2018 season (100%)	0	0	0	182	178
90	GER	Jennifer Urban / Benjamin Steffan	360	2016/2017 season (100%)	0	0	0	0	0
90	GER	Jennifer Urban / Benjamin Steffan	360	2015/2016 season (70%)	0	0	0	0	0
91	CAN	Ellie Fisher / Simon-Pierre Malette-Paque	346	2017/2018 season (100%)	0	182	164	0	0
91	CAN	Ellie Fisher / Simon-Pierre Malette-Paque	346	2016/2017 season (100%)	0	0	0	0	0
91	CAN	Ellie Fisher / Simon-Pierre Malette-Paque	346	2015/2016 season (70%)	0	0	0	0	0
92	CAN	Olivia McIsaac / Elliott Graham	339	2017/2018 season (100%)	157	182	0	0	0
92	CAN	Olivia McIsaac / Elliott Graham	339	2016/2017 season (100%)	0	0	0	0	0
92	CAN	Olivia McIsaac / Elliott Graham	339	2015/2016 season (70%)	0	0	0	0	0
93	FIN	Juulia Turkkila / Matthias Versluis	328	2017/2018 season (100%)	0	0	0	164	164
93	FIN	Juulia Turkkila / Matthias Versluis	328	2016/2017 season (100%)	0	0	0	0	0
93	FIN	Juulia Turkkila / Matthias Versluis	328	2015/2016 season (70%)	0	0	0	0	0
94	CHN	Hong Chen / Yan Zhao	325	2017/2018 season (100%)	0	0	0	0	0
94	CHN	Hong Chen / Yan Zhao	325	2016/2017 season (100%)	325	0	0	0	0
94	CHN	Hong Chen / Yan Zhao	325	2015/2016 season (70%)	0	0	0	0	0
95	FIN	Olesia Karmi / Max Lindholm	312	2017/2018 season (100%)	0	0	0	0	0
95	FIN	Olesia Karmi / Max Lindholm	312	2016/2017 season (100%)	0	0	0	0	0
95	FIN	Olesia Karmi / Max Lindholm	312	2015/2016 season (70%)	0	0	0	170	142
95	USA	Avonley Nguyen / Vadym Kolesnik	312	2017/2018 season (100%)	0	164	148	0	0
95	USA	Avonley Nguyen / Vadym Kolesnik	312	2016/2017 season (100%)	0	0	0	0	0
95	USA	Avonley Nguyen / Vadym Kolesnik	312	2015/2016 season (70%)	0	0	0	0	0
97	USA	Charlotte Maxwell / Ryan Devereaux	305	2017/2018 season (100%)	0	0	0	0	0
97	USA	Charlotte Maxwell / Ryan Devereaux	305	2016/2017 season (100%)	0	0	0	178	0
97	USA	Charlotte Maxwell / Ryan Devereaux	305	2015/2016 season (70%)	0	0	0	127	0
98	EST	Viktoria Semenjuk / Artur Gruzdev	296	2017/2018 season (100%)	68	0	0	0	0
98	EST	Viktoria Semenjuk / Artur Gruzdev	296	2016/2017 season (100%)	0	120	108	0	0
98	EST	Viktoria Semenjuk / Artur Gruzdev	296	2015/2016 season (70%)	0	0	0	0	0
99	UKR	Valeria Gaistruk / Alexei Olejnik	269	2017/2018 season (100%)	0	0	0	0	0
99	UKR	Valeria Gaistruk / Alexei Olejnik	269	2016/2017 season (100%)	0	0	0	0	0
99	UKR	Valeria Gaistruk / Alexei Olejnik	269	2015/2016 season (70%)	0	0	0	142	127
100	CAN	Seungyun Han / Grayson Lochhead	253	2017/2018 season (100%)	0	133	0	0	0
100	CAN	Seungyun Han / Grayson Lochhead	253	2016/2017 season (100%)	0	120	0	0	0
100	CAN	Seungyun Han / Grayson Lochhead	253	2015/2016 season (70%)	0	0	0	0	0
101	FRA	Adelina Galayavieva / Laurent Abecassis	248	2017/2018 season (100%)	0	0	0	0	0
101	FRA	Adelina Galayavieva / Laurent Abecassis	248	2016/2017 season (100%)	0	0	0	164	0
101	FRA	Adelina Galayavieva / Laurent Abecassis	248	2015/2016 season (70%)	0	84	0	0	0
102	AUS	Chantelle Kerry / Andrew Dodds	237	2017/2018 season (100%)	237	0	0	0	0
102	AUS	Chantelle Kerry / Andrew Dodds	237	2016/2017 season (100%)	0	0	0	0	0
102	AUS	Chantelle Kerry / Andrew Dodds	237	2015/2016 season (70%)	0	0	0	0	0
103	HUN	Villö Marton / Danyil Semko	235	2017/2018 season (100%)	127	108	0	0	0
103	HUN	Villö Marton / Danyil Semko	235	2016/2017 season (100%)	0	0	0	0	0
103	HUN	Villö Marton / Danyil Semko	235	2015/2016 season (70%)	0	0	0	0	0
104	GBR	Sasha Fear / George Waddell	230	2017/2018 season (100%)	0	133	97	0	0
104	GBR	Sasha Fear / George Waddell	230	2016/2017 season (100%)	0	0	0	0	0
104	GBR	Sasha Fear / George Waddell	230	2015/2016 season (70%)	0	0	0	0	0
105	CHN	Yuzhu Guo / Pengkun Zhao	216	2017/2018 season (100%)	0	108	0	0	0
105	CHN	Yuzhu Guo / Pengkun Zhao	216	2016/2017 season (100%)	0	108	0	0	0
105	CHN	Yuzhu Guo / Pengkun Zhao	216	2015/2016 season (70%)	0	0	0	0	0
106	GEO	Maria Kazakova / Georgy Reviya	215	2017/2018 season (100%)	215	0	0	0	0
106	GEO	Maria Kazakova / Georgy Reviya	215	2016/2017 season (100%)	0	0	0	0	0
106	GEO	Maria Kazakova / Georgy Reviya	215	2015/2016 season (70%)	0	0	0	0	0
107	AUS	Adele Morrison / Demid Rokachev	214	2017/2018 season (100%)	0	0	0	0	0
107	AUS	Adele Morrison / Demid Rokachev	214	2016/2017 season (100%)	214	0	0	0	0
107	AUS	Adele Morrison / Demid Rokachev	214	2015/2016 season (70%)	0	0	0	0	0
108	CHN	Xibei Li / Guangyao Xiang	210	2017/2018 season (100%)	0	0	0	0	0
108	CHN	Xibei Li / Guangyao Xiang	210	2016/2017 season (100%)	0	0	0	0	0
108	CHN	Xibei Li / Guangyao Xiang	210	2015/2016 season (70%)	134	76	0	0	0
109	CHN	Wanqi Ning / Chao Wang	205	2017/2018 season (100%)	0	108	97	0	0
109	CHN	Wanqi Ning / Chao Wang	205	2016/2017 season (100%)	0	0	0	0	0
109	CHN	Wanqi Ning / Chao Wang	205	2015/2016 season (70%)	0	0	0	0	0
110	SUI	Victoria Manni / Carlo Röthlisberger	203	2017/2018 season (100%)	0	0	0	0	0
110	SUI	Victoria Manni / Carlo Röthlisberger	203	2016/2017 season (100%)	0	0	0	203	0
110	SUI	Victoria Manni / Carlo Röthlisberger	203	2015/2016 season (70%)	0	0	0	0	0
111	CAN	Valerie Taillefer / Jason Chan	196	2017/2018 season (100%)	0	120	0	0	0
111	CAN	Valerie Taillefer / Jason Chan	196	2016/2017 season (100%)	0	0	0	0	0
111	CAN	Valerie Taillefer / Jason Chan	196	2015/2016 season (70%)	0	76	0	0	0
112	GER	Charise Matthaei / Maximilian Pfisterer	183	2017/2018 season (100%)	75	108	0	0	0
112	GER	Charise Matthaei / Maximilian Pfisterer	183	2016/2017 season (100%)	0	0	0	0	0
112	GER	Charise Matthaei / Maximilian Pfisterer	183	2015/2016 season (70%)	0	0	0	0	0
113	CAN	Nicole Orford / Asher Hill	175	2017/2018 season (100%)	0	0	0	0	0
113	CAN	Nicole Orford / Asher Hill	175	2016/2017 season (100%)	0	0	0	0	0
113	CAN	Nicole Orford / Asher Hill	175	2015/2016 season (70%)	0	0	0	175	0
114	AUS	Kimberley Hew-Low / Timothy McKernan	173	2017/2018 season (100%)	0	0	0	0	0
114	AUS	Kimberley Hew-Low / Timothy McKernan	173	2016/2017 season (100%)	173	0	0	0	0
114	AUS	Kimberley Hew-Low / Timothy McKernan	173	2015/2016 season (70%)	0	0	0	0	0
115	RUS	Ludmila Sosnitskaia / Pavel Golovishnokov	170	2017/2018 season (100%)	0	0	0	0	0
115	RUS	Ludmila Sosnitskaia / Pavel Golovishnokov	170	2016/2017 season (100%)	0	0	0	0	0
115	RUS	Ludmila Sosnitskaia / Pavel Golovishnokov	170	2015/2016 season (70%)	0	0	0	170	0
116	LTU	Guoste Damuleviciute / Deividas Kizala	169	2017/2018 season (100%)	0	0	0	0	0
116	LTU	Guoste Damuleviciute / Deividas Kizala	169	2016/2017 season (100%)	93	0	0	0	0
116	LTU	Guoste Damuleviciute / Deividas Kizala	169	2015/2016 season (70%)	0	76	0	0	0
117	CHN	Yiyi Zhang / Nan Wu	166	2017/2018 season (100%)	0	0	0	0	0
117	CHN	Yiyi Zhang / Nan Wu	166	2016/2017 season (100%)	0	0	0	0	0
117	CHN	Yiyi Zhang / Nan Wu	166	2015/2016 season (70%)	166	0	0	0	0
118	TUR	Cagla Demirsal / Berk Akalin	164	2017/2018 season (100%)	0	0	0	0	0
118	TUR	Cagla Demirsal / Berk Akalin	164	2016/2017 season (100%)	0	0	0	164	0
118	TUR	Cagla Demirsal / Berk Akalin	164	2015/2016 season (70%)	0	0	0	0	0
118	GBR	Robynne Tweedale / Joseph Buckland	164	2017/2018 season (100%)	0	0	0	164	0
118	GBR	Robynne Tweedale / Joseph Buckland	164	2016/2017 season (100%)	0	0	0	0	0
118	GBR	Robynne Tweedale / Joseph Buckland	164	2015/2016 season (70%)	0	0	0	0	0
118	ISR	Adel Tankova / Ronald Zilberberg	164	2017/2018 season (100%)	0	0	0	0	0
118	ISR	Adel Tankova / Ronald Zilberberg	164	2016/2017 season (100%)	0	0	0	164	0
118	ISR	Adel Tankova / Ronald Zilberberg	164	2015/2016 season (70%)	0	0	0	0	0
118	RUS	Vlada Solovieva / Yuri Vlasenko	164	2017/2018 season (100%)	0	0	0	164	0
118	RUS	Vlada Solovieva / Yuri Vlasenko	164	2016/2017 season (100%)	0	0	0	0	0
118	RUS	Vlada Solovieva / Yuri Vlasenko	164	2015/2016 season (70%)	0	0	0	0	0
118	RUS	Polina Ivanenko / Daniil Karpov	164	2017/2018 season (100%)	0	0	0	0	0
118	RUS	Polina Ivanenko / Daniil Karpov	164	2016/2017 season (100%)	0	164	0	0	0
118	RUS	Polina Ivanenko / Daniil Karpov	164	2015/2016 season (70%)	0	0	0	0	0
123	CAN	Andreanne Poulin / Marc-Andre Servant	158	2017/2018 season (100%)	0	0	0	0	0
123	CAN	Andreanne Poulin / Marc-Andre Servant	158	2016/2017 season (100%)	0	0	0	0	0
123	CAN	Andreanne Poulin / Marc-Andre Servant	158	2015/2016 season (70%)	0	0	0	158	0
124	POL	Olexandra Borysova / Cezary Zawadzki	156	2017/2018 season (100%)	0	0	0	0	0
124	POL	Olexandra Borysova / Cezary Zawadzki	156	2016/2017 season (100%)	0	108	0	0	0
124	POL	Olexandra Borysova / Cezary Zawadzki	156	2015/2016 season (70%)	48	0	0	0	0
125	RUS	Eva Kuts / Dmitrii Mikhailov	148	2017/2018 season (100%)	0	0	0	0	0
125	RUS	Eva Kuts / Dmitrii Mikhailov	148	2016/2017 season (100%)	0	148	0	0	0
125	RUS	Eva Kuts / Dmitrii Mikhailov	148	2015/2016 season (70%)	0	0	0	0	0
125	CAN	Natalie D'Alessandro / Bruce Waddell	148	2017/2018 season (100%)	0	148	0	0	0
125	CAN	Natalie D'Alessandro / Bruce Waddell	148	2016/2017 season (100%)	0	0	0	0	0
125	CAN	Natalie D'Alessandro / Bruce Waddell	148	2015/2016 season (70%)	0	0	0	0	0
127	GBR	Emily Rose Brown / James Hernandez	133	2017/2018 season (100%)	0	133	0	0	0
127	GBR	Emily Rose Brown / James Hernandez	133	2016/2017 season (100%)	0	0	0	0	0
127	GBR	Emily Rose Brown / James Hernandez	133	2015/2016 season (70%)	0	0	0	0	0
127	UKR	Olga Giglava / Yegor Yegorov	133	2017/2018 season (100%)	0	133	0	0	0
127	UKR	Olga Giglava / Yegor Yegorov	133	2016/2017 season (100%)	0	0	0	0	0
127	UKR	Olga Giglava / Yegor Yegorov	133	2015/2016 season (70%)	0	0	0	0	0
127	CAN	Danielle Wu / Nik Mirzakhani	133	2017/2018 season (100%)	0	0	0	0	0
127	CAN	Danielle Wu / Nik Mirzakhani	133	2016/2017 season (100%)	0	133	0	0	0
127	CAN	Danielle Wu / Nik Mirzakhani	133	2015/2016 season (70%)	0	0	0	0	0
127	FRA	Salome Abdedou / Dylan Antunes	133	2017/2018 season (100%)	0	0	0	0	0
127	FRA	Salome Abdedou / Dylan Antunes	133	2016/2017 season (100%)	0	133	0	0	0
127	FRA	Salome Abdedou / Dylan Antunes	133	2015/2016 season (70%)	0	0	0	0	0
131	AUS	Jessica Palfreyman / Charlton Doherty	120	2017/2018 season (100%)	0	120	0	0	0
131	AUS	Jessica Palfreyman / Charlton Doherty	120	2016/2017 season (100%)	0	0	0	0	0
131	AUS	Jessica Palfreyman / Charlton Doherty	120	2015/2016 season (70%)	0	0	0	0	0
131	EST	Katerina Bunina / German Frolov	120	2017/2018 season (100%)	0	0	0	0	0
131	EST	Katerina Bunina / German Frolov	120	2016/2017 season (100%)	0	120	0	0	0
131	EST	Katerina Bunina / German Frolov	120	2015/2016 season (70%)	0	0	0	0	0
131	USA	Isabella Amoia / Luca Becker	120	2017/2018 season (100%)	0	120	0	0	0
131	USA	Isabella Amoia / Luca Becker	120	2016/2017 season (100%)	0	0	0	0	0
131	USA	Isabella Amoia / Luca Becker	120	2015/2016 season (70%)	0	0	0	0	0
134	USA	Alissandra Aronow / Collin Brubaker	115	2017/2018 season (100%)	0	0	0	0	0
134	USA	Alissandra Aronow / Collin Brubaker	115	2016/2017 season (100%)	0	0	0	0	0
134	USA	Alissandra Aronow / Collin Brubaker	115	2015/2016 season (70%)	0	0	0	115	0
135	GER	Sarah Michelle Knispel / Maximilian Voigtländer	108	2017/2018 season (100%)	0	0	0	0	0
135	GER	Sarah Michelle Knispel / Maximilian Voigtländer	108	2016/2017 season (100%)	0	108	0	0	0
135	GER	Sarah Michelle Knispel / Maximilian Voigtländer	108	2015/2016 season (70%)	0	0	0	0	0
135	AUS	Joanne Cho / Jake Meyer	108	2017/2018 season (100%)	0	108	0	0	0
135	AUS	Joanne Cho / Jake Meyer	108	2016/2017 season (100%)	0	0	0	0	0
135	AUS	Joanne Cho / Jake Meyer	108	2015/2016 season (70%)	0	0	0	0	0
135	CAN	Irina Galiyanova / Tommy Tang	108	2017/2018 season (100%)	0	108	0	0	0
135	CAN	Irina Galiyanova / Tommy Tang	108	2016/2017 season (100%)	0	0	0	0	0
135	CAN	Irina Galiyanova / Tommy Tang	108	2015/2016 season (70%)	0	0	0	0	0
138	USA	Emily Day / Kevin Leahy	104	2017/2018 season (100%)	0	0	0	0	0
138	USA	Emily Day / Kevin Leahy	104	2016/2017 season (100%)	0	0	0	0	0
138	USA	Emily Day / Kevin Leahy	104	2015/2016 season (70%)	0	104	0	0	0
139	AZE	Yana Buga / Georgy Pokhilyuk	103	2017/2018 season (100%)	103	0	0	0	0
139	AZE	Yana Buga / Georgy Pokhilyuk	103	2016/2017 season (100%)	0	0	0	0	0
139	AZE	Yana Buga / Georgy Pokhilyuk	103	2015/2016 season (70%)	0	0	0	0	0
140	ITA	Carolina Portesi Peroni / Michael Chrastecky	97	2017/2018 season (100%)	0	97	0	0	0
140	ITA	Carolina Portesi Peroni / Michael Chrastecky	97	2016/2017 season (100%)	0	0	0	0	0
140	ITA	Carolina Portesi Peroni / Michael Chrastecky	97	2015/2016 season (70%)	0	0	0	0	0
140	BLR	Adelina Zvezdova / Uladzimir Zaitsau	97	2017/2018 season (100%)	0	97	0	0	0
140	BLR	Adelina Zvezdova / Uladzimir Zaitsau	97	2016/2017 season (100%)	0	0	0	0	0
140	BLR	Adelina Zvezdova / Uladzimir Zaitsau	97	2015/2016 season (70%)	0	0	0	0	0
140	AUT	Elizaveta Orlova / Stephano Valentino Schuster	97	2017/2018 season (100%)	0	0	0	0	0
140	AUT	Elizaveta Orlova / Stephano Valentino Schuster	97	2016/2017 season (100%)	0	97	0	0	0
140	AUT	Elizaveta Orlova / Stephano Valentino Schuster	97	2015/2016 season (70%)	0	0	0	0	0
143	CZE	Natalie Taschlerova / Filip Taschler	83	2017/2018 season (100%)	83	0	0	0	0
143	CZE	Natalie Taschlerova / Filip Taschler	83	2016/2017 season (100%)	0	0	0	0	0
143	CZE	Natalie Taschlerova / Filip Taschler	83	2015/2016 season (70%)	0	0	0	0	0
144	FIN	Monica Lindfors / Juho Pirinen	75	2017/2018 season (100%)	0	0	0	0	0
144	FIN	Monica Lindfors / Juho Pirinen	75	2016/2017 season (100%)	75	0	0	0	0
144	FIN	Monica Lindfors / Juho Pirinen	75	2015/2016 season (70%)	0	0	0	0	0

=== Season standings ===
==== Pairs (78 couples) ====
As of 22 March 2018

Rank	Nation	Couple	Points	Season	ISU Championships or Olympics	(Junior) Grand Prix and Final		Selected International Competition	
Rank	Nation	Couple	Points	Season	Best	Best	2nd Best	Best	2nd Best
1	GER	Aljona Savchenko / Bruno Massot	2670	2017/2018 season (100%)	1200	800	400	270	0
2	RUS	Evgenia Tarasova / Vladimir Morozov	2305	2017/2018 season (100%)	1080	525	400	300	0
3	CAN	Meagan Duhamel / Eric Radford	2290	2017/2018 season (100%)	972	648	400	270	0
4	CHN	Wenjing Sui / Cong Han	2200	2017/2018 season (100%)	1080	720	400	0	0
5	RUS	Natalia Zabiiako / Alexander Enbert	2059	2017/2018 season (100%)	875	292	292	300	300
6	FRA	Vanessa James / Morgan Ciprès	1956	2017/2018 season (100%)	972	360	324	300	0
7	ITA	Nicole Della Monica / Matteo Guarise	1943	2017/2018 season (100%)	787	324	292	270	270
8	RUS	Ksenia Stolbova / Fedor Klimov	1942	2017/2018 season (100%)	756	583	360	243	0
9	ITA	Valentina Marchei / Ondřej Hotárek	1806	2017/2018 season (100%)	709	292	262	300	243
10	RUS	Kristina Astakhova / Alexei Rogonov	1762	2017/2018 season (100%)	574	324	324	270	270
11	CHN	Xiaoyu Yu / Hao Zhang	1720	2017/2018 season (100%)	638	472	360	250	0
12	AUS	Ekaterina Alexandrovskaya / Harley Windsor	1639	2017/2018 season (100%)	496	350	250	300	243
13	CAN	Kirsten Moore-Towers / Michael Marinaro	1569	2017/2018 season (100%)	709	324	236	300	0
14	CAN	Liubov Ilyushechkina / Dylan Moscovitch	1359	2017/2018 season (100%)	612	292	236	219	0
15	CHN	Cheng Peng / Yang Jin	1341	2017/2018 season (100%)	517	262	262	300	0
16	CAN	Julianne Séguin / Charlie Bilodeau	1314	2017/2018 season (100%)	517	292	262	243	0
17	USA	Ashley Cain / Timothy Leduc	1211	2017/2018 season (100%)	756	236	0	219	0
18	AUT	Miriam Ziegler / Severin Kiefer	1137	2017/2018 season (100%)	446	236	236	219	0
19	USA	Tarah Kayne / Danny O'Shea	1083	2017/2018 season (100%)	840	0	0	243	0
20	USA	Alexa Scimeca Knierim / Chris Knierim	1069	2017/2018 season (100%)	275	262	262	270	0
21	RUS	Daria Pavliuchenko / Denis Khodykin	1034	2017/2018 season (100%)	500	284	250	0	0
22	RUS	Aleksandra Boikova / Dmitrii Kozlovskii	1025	2017/2018 season (100%)	0	230	225	300	270
23	FRA	Lola Esbrat / Andrei Novoselov	921	2017/2018 season (100%)	325	213	0	219	164
24	GER	Annika Hocke / Ruben Blommaert	897	2017/2018 season (100%)	402	0	0	270	225
25	RUS	Polina Kostiukovich / Dmitrii Ialin	848	2017/2018 season (100%)	450	250	148	0	0
26	CHN	Yumeng Gao / Zhong Xie	845	2017/2018 season (100%)	365	255	225	0	0
27	ISR	Paige Conners / Evgeni Krasnopolski	803	2017/2018 season (100%)	362	0	0	243	198
28	USA	Deanna Stellato / Nathan Bartholomay	742	2017/2018 season (100%)	551	191	0	0	0
29	SUI	Ioulia Chtchetinina / Mikhail Akulov	681	2017/2018 season (100%)	237	0	0	225	219
30	CAN	Evelyn Walsh / Trennt Michaud	680	2017/2018 season (100%)	295	203	182	0	0
30	PRK	Tae Ok Ryom / Ju Sik Kim	680	2017/2018 season (100%)	680	0	0	0	0
32	RUS	Anastasia Poluianova / Dmitry Sopot	675	2017/2018 season (100%)	0	225	207	243	0
33	USA	Marissa Castelli / Mervin Tran	668	2017/2018 season (100%)	0	236	213	219	0
34	USA	Audrey Lu / Misha Mitrofanov	656	2017/2018 season (100%)	328	164	164	0	0
35	USA	Haven Denney / Brandon Frazier	645	2017/2018 season (100%)	0	213	213	219	0
36	AZE	Sofiya Karagodina / Semyon Stepanov	637	2017/2018 season (100%)	214	0	0	225	198
37	GBR	Zoe Jones / Christopher Boyadji	623	2017/2018 season (100%)	0	191	0	250	182
38	JPN	Miu Suzaki / Ryuichi Kihara	593	2017/2018 season (100%)	402	191	0	0	0
39	RUS	Apollinariia Panfilova / Dmitry Rylov	565	2017/2018 season (100%)	0	315	250	0	0
40	CAN	Sydney Kolodziej / Maxime Deschamps	553	2017/2018 season (100%)	362	191	0	0	0
41	ESP	Laura Barquero / Aritz Maestu	543	2017/2018 season (100%)	293	0	0	250	0
42	JPN	Riku Miura / Shoya Ichihashi	519	2017/2018 season (100%)	325	97	97	0	0
43	RUS	Alisa Efimova / Alexander Korovin	513	2017/2018 season (100%)	0	0	0	270	243
44	GER	Talisa Thomalla / Robert Kunkel	483	2017/2018 season (100%)	266	120	97	0	0
45	GER	Minerva Fabienne Hase / Nolan Seegert	462	2017/2018 season (100%)	0	0	0	243	219
46	CRO	Lana Petranovic / Antonio Souza-Kordeiru	446	2017/2018 season (100%)	264	0	0	182	0
46	CAN	Camille Ruest / Andrew Wolfe	446	2017/2018 season (100%)	446	0	0	0	0
48	CZE	Anna Dušková / Martin Bidař	418	2017/2018 season (100%)	418	0	0	0	0
49	USA	Jessica Pfund / Joshua Santillan	417	2017/2018 season (100%)	0	0	0	219	198
50	RUS	Anastasia Mishina / Aleksandr Galiamov	405	2017/2018 season (100%)	405	0	0	0	0
51	JPN	Sumire Suto / Francis Boudreau-Audet	404	2017/2018 season (100%)	0	213	191	0	0
52	KOR	Kyueun Kim / Alex Kang Chan Kam	401	2017/2018 season (100%)	0	0	0	203	198
53	USA	Sarah Feng / Tommy-Jo Nyman	359	2017/2018 season (100%)	239	120	0	0	0
54	CHN	Feiyao Tang / Yongchao Yang	339	2017/2018 season (100%)	157	182	0	0	0
55	CAN	Lori-Ann Matte / Thierry Ferland	335	2017/2018 season (100%)	215	120	0	0	0
56	USA	Laiken Lockley / Keenan Prochnow	328	2017/2018 season (100%)	0	164	164	0	0
57	FRA	Cleo Hamon / Denys Strekalin	294	2017/2018 season (100%)	174	120	0	0	0
58	USA	Chelsea Liu / Brian Johnson	243	2017/2018 season (100%)	0	0	0	243	0
59	CHN	Jiaying Sui / Yunzhi Guo	241	2017/2018 season (100%)	0	133	108	0	0
59	CHN	Yuyao Zhang / Ziqi Jia	241	2017/2018 season (100%)	0	133	108	0	0
61	CHN	Mingyang Zhang / Bowen Song	213	2017/2018 season (100%)	0	213	0	0	0
62	ITA	Rebecca Ghilardi / Filippo Ambrosini	203	2017/2018 season (100%)	0	0	0	203	0
63	RUS	Alina Ustimkina / Nikita Volodin	198	2017/2018 season (100%)	0	0	0	198	0
63	FRA	Camille Mendoza / Pavel Kovalev	198	2017/2018 season (100%)	0	0	0	198	0
63	CAN	Natasha Purich / Davin Portz	198	2017/2018 season (100%)	0	0	0	198	0
66	FIN	Liubov Efimenko / Matthew Penasse	182	2017/2018 season (100%)	0	0	0	182	0
67	FRA	Coline Keriven / Antoine Pierre	164	2017/2018 season (100%)	0	0	0	164	0
68	RUS	Kseniia Akhanteva / Valerii Kolesov	148	2017/2018 season (100%)	0	148	0	0	0
68	RUS	Daria Kvartalova / Alexei Sviatchenko	148	2017/2018 season (100%)	0	148	0	0	0
68	CAN	Chloe Panetta / Steven Lapointe	148	2017/2018 season (100%)	0	148	0	0	0
71	ESP	Isabella Gamez / Ton Consul	141	2017/2018 season (100%)	141	0	0	0	0
72	CAN	Chloe Choinard / Mathieu Ostiguy	133	2017/2018 season (100%)	0	133	0	0	0
72	USA	Elizabeth Vasilevna Kopmar / Jonah Barrett	133	2017/2018 season (100%)	0	133	0	0	0
74	UKR	Sofiia Nesterova / Artem Darenskyi	127	2017/2018 season (100%)	127	0	0	0	0
75	CZE	Edita Hornakova / Radek Jakubka	114	2017/2018 season (100%)	114	0	0	0	0
76	ITA	Irma Caldara / Edoardo Caputo	108	2017/2018 season (100%)	0	108	0	0	0
77	ISR	Hailey Esther Kops / Artem Tsoglin	103	2017/2018 season (100%)	103	0	0	0	0
78	CAN	Olivia Boys-Eddy / Mackenzie Boys-Eddy	97	2017/2018 season (100%)	0	97	0	0	0

==== Ice dance (105 couples) ====
As of 24 March 2018

Rank	Nation	Couple	Points	Season	ISU Championships or Olympics	(Junior) Grand Prix and Final		Selected International Competition	
Rank	Nation	Couple	Points	Season	Best	Best	2nd Best	Best	2nd Best
1	FRA	Gabriella Papadakis / Guillaume Cizeron	2700	2017/2018 season (100%)	1200	800	400	300	0
2	CAN	Tessa Virtue / Scott Moir	2620	2017/2018 season (100%)	1200	720	400	300	0
3	USA	Madison Hubbell / Zachary Donohue	2323	2017/2018 season (100%)	1080	583	360	300	0
4	RUS	Ekaterina Bobrova / Dmitri Soloviev	2071	2017/2018 season (100%)	787	360	324	300	300
5	USA	Maia Shibutani / Alex Shibutani	2020	2017/2018 season (100%)	972	648	400	0	0
6	ITA	Anna Cappellini / Luca Lanotte	2007	2017/2018 season (100%)	875	472	360	300	0
7	USA	Kaitlin Hawayek / Jean-Luc Baker	1907	2017/2018 season (100%)	840	292	262	270	243
8	CAN	Kaitlyn Weaver / Andrew Poje	1894	2017/2018 season (100%)	972	360	292	270	0
9	USA	Madison Chock / Evan Bates	1672	2017/2018 season (100%)	787	525	360	0	0
10	ITA	Charlene Guignard / Marco Fabbri	1645	2017/2018 season (100%)	551	262	262	300	270
11	RUS	Alexandra Stepanova / Ivan Bukin	1598	2017/2018 season (100%)	680	324	324	270	0
12	RUS	Tiffani Zagorski / Jonathan Guerreiro	1550	2017/2018 season (100%)	574	292	236	270	178
13	CAN	Piper Gilles / Paul Poirier	1536	2017/2018 season (100%)	709	292	292	243	0
14	JPN	Kana Muramoto / Chris Reed	1406	2017/2018 season (100%)	680	213	0	270	243
15	USA	Lorraine McNamara / Quinn Carpenter	1394	2017/2018 season (100%)	612	262	0	270	250
16	CAN	Carolane Soucisse / Shane Firus	1386	2017/2018 season (100%)	756	213	0	219	198
17	GBR	Penny Coomes / Nicholas Buckland	1209	2017/2018 season (100%)	446	213	0	300	250
18	USA	Rachel Parsons / Michael Parsons	1204	2017/2018 season (100%)	496	213	0	270	225
19	CHN	Shiyue Wang / Xinyu Liu	1203	2017/2018 season (100%)	551	236	191	225	0
20	FRA	Marie-Jade Lauriault / Romain Le Gac	1102	2017/2018 season (100%)	339	191	191	203	178
21	RUS	Anastasia Skoptcova / Kirill Aleshin	1100	2017/2018 season (100%)	500	350	250	0	0
22	CAN	Laurence Fournier Beaudry / Nikolaj Sørensen	1086	2017/2018 season (100%)	362	262	0	243	219
23	POL	Natalia Kaliszek / Maksym Spodyriev	1066	2017/2018 season (100%)	325	191	0	300	250
24	ESP	Olivia Smart / Adrian Diaz	1030	2017/2018 season (100%)	377	236	0	219	198
25	UKR	Alexandra Nazarova / Maxim Nikitin	1022	2017/2018 season (100%)	293	236	0	250	243
26	USA	Christina Carreira / Anthony Ponomarenko	1015	2017/2018 season (100%)	450	315	250	0	0
27	FRA	Angelique Abachkina / Louis Thauron	980	2017/2018 season (100%)	173	236	191	198	182
28	USA	Elliana Pogrebinsky / Alex Benoit	888	2017/2018 season (100%)	0	213	213	243	219
29	RUS	Arina Ushakova / Maxim Nekrasov	885	2017/2018 season (100%)	405	250	230	0	0
30	KOR	Yura Min / Alexander Gamelin	884	2017/2018 season (100%)	446	0	0	219	219
31	GER	Kavita Lorenz / Joti Polizoakis	879	2017/2018 season (100%)	247	191	0	243	198
32	ESP	Sara Hurtado / Kirill Khaliavin	871	2017/2018 season (100%)	402	0	0	250	219
33	RUS	Victoria Sinitsina / Nikita Katsalapov	859	2017/2018 season (100%)	0	324	292	243	0
34	CAN	Marjorie Lajoie / Zachary Lagha	840	2017/2018 season (100%)	365	250	225	0	0
35	RUS	Sofia Shevchenko / Igor Eremenko	833	2017/2018 season (100%)	328	255	250	0	0
36	RUS	Betina Popova / Sergey Mozgov	779	2017/2018 season (100%)	0	236	0	300	243
37	UKR	Darya Popova / Volodymyr Byelikov	711	2017/2018 season (100%)	174	164	148	225	0
38	USA	Gordon Green / Gordon Green	701	2017/2018 season (100%)	295	203	203	0	0
39	TUR	Alisa Agafonova / Alper Uçar	685	2017/2018 season (100%)	237	0	0	270	178
40	HUN	Anna Yanovskaya / Ádám Lukács	642	2017/2018 season (100%)	214	0	0	225	203
41	FIN	Cecilia Törn / Jussiville Partanen	640	2017/2018 season (100%)	192	0	0	250	198
42	USA	Chloe Lewis / Logan Bye	594	2017/2018 season (100%)	266	164	164	0	0
43	ITA	Jasmine Tessari / Francesco Fioretti	590	2017/2018 season (100%)	140	0	0	225	225
44	RUS	Sofia Polishchuk / Alexander Vakhnov	534	2017/2018 season (100%)	0	284	250	0	0
45	RUS	Alla Loboda / Pavel Drozd	532	2017/2018 season (100%)	0	262	0	270	0
46	JPN	Misato Komatsubara / Tim Koleto	507	2017/2018 season (100%)	325	0	0	182	0
47	LTU	Allison Reed / Saulius Ambrulevičius	504	2017/2018 season (100%)	162	0	0	178	164
48	GBR	Lilah Fear / Lewis Gibson	475	2017/2018 season (100%)	0	0	0	250	225
49	JPN	Rikako Fukase / Aru Tateno	457	2017/2018 season (100%)	293	0	0	164	0
50	GER	Katharina Müller / Tim Dieck	448	2017/2018 season (100%)	0	0	0	250	198
51	FRA	Natacha Lagouge / Corentin Rahier	442	2017/2018 season (100%)	239	203	0	0	0
52	RUS	Ksenia Konkina / Grigory Yakushev	428	2017/2018 season (100%)	0	225	203	0	0
52	RUS	Elizaveta Khudaiberdieva / Nikita Nazarov	428	2017/2018 season (100%)	0	225	203	0	0
54	ISR	Shira Ichilov / Vadim Davidovich	423	2017/2018 season (100%)	93	182	148	0	0
55	ITA	Chiara Calderone / Pietro Papetti	422	2017/2018 season (100%)	141	148	133	0	0
55	RUS	Sofia Evdokimova / Egor Bazin	422	2017/2018 season (100%)	0	0	0	219	203
57	GER	Shari Koch / Christian Nüchtern	406	2017/2018 season (100%)	0	0	0	203	203
58	CAN	Sarah Arnold / Thomas Williams	402	2017/2018 season (100%)	402	0	0	0	0
59	CZE	Cortney Mansourova / Michal Ceska	380	2017/2018 season (100%)	0	0	0	198	182
60	CAN	Alicia Fabbri / Claudio Pietrantonio	367	2017/2018 season (100%)	0	203	164	0	0
61	USA	Eliana Gropman / Ian Somerville	364	2017/2018 season (100%)	0	182	182	0	0
62	CAN	Haley Sales / Nikolas Wamsteeker	362	2017/2018 season (100%)	362	0	0	0	0
63	GER	Jennifer Urban / Benjamin Steffan	360	2017/2018 season (100%)	0	0	0	182	178
64	CAN	Ellie Fisher / Simon-Pierre Malette-Paque	346	2017/2018 season (100%)	0	182	164	0	0
64	CAN	Ashlynne Stairs / Lee Royer	346	2017/2018 season (100%)	0	182	164	0	0
66	SVK	Lucie Myslivečková / Lukáš Csölley	340	2017/2018 season (100%)	162	0	0	178	0
67	CAN	Olivia McIsaac / Elliott Graham	339	2017/2018 season (100%)	157	182	0	0	0
68	FRA	Loicia Demougeot / Theo Le Mercier	331	2017/2018 season (100%)	114	120	97	0	0
69	FIN	Juulia Turkkila / Matthias Versluis	328	2017/2018 season (100%)	0	0	0	164	164
70	GER	Ria Schwendinger / Valentin Wunderlich	314	2017/2018 season (100%)	194	120	0	0	0
71	USA	Avonley Nguyen / Vadym Kolesnik	312	2017/2018 season (100%)	0	164	148	0	0
72	ARM	Tina Garabedian / Simon Proulx Senecal	304	2017/2018 season (100%)	126	0	0	178	0
73	BLR	Viktoria Kavaliova / Yurii Bieliaiev	295	2017/2018 season (100%)	113	0	0	182	0
74	BLR	Emiliya Kalehanova / Uladzislau Palkhouski	281	2017/2018 season (100%)	0	148	133	0	0
75	CHN	Linshu Song / Zhuoming Sun	264	2017/2018 season (100%)	264	0	0	0	0
76	UKR	Maria Golubtsova / Kirill Belobrov	256	2017/2018 season (100%)	0	148	108	0	0
77	FRA	Julia Wagret / Mathieu Couyras	240	2017/2018 season (100%)	0	120	120	0	0
78	AUS	Chantelle Kerry / Andrew Dodds	237	2017/2018 season (100%)	237	0	0	0	0
79	HUN	Villö Marton / Danyil Semko	235	2017/2018 season (100%)	127	108	0	0	0
80	USA	Emma Gunter / Caleb Wein	230	2017/2018 season (100%)	0	133	97	0	0
80	GBR	Sasha Fear / George Waddell	230	2017/2018 season (100%)	0	133	97	0	0
82	RUS	Anastasia Shpilevaya / Grigory Smirnov	225	2017/2018 season (100%)	0	225	0	0	0
83	GEO	Maria Kazakova / Georgy Reviya	215	2017/2018 season (100%)	215	0	0	0	0
84	AUS	Matilda Friend / William Badaoui	214	2017/2018 season (100%)	214	0	0	0	0
85	CHN	Wanqi Ning / Chao Wang	205	2017/2018 season (100%)	0	108	97	0	0
86	GER	Charise Matthaei / Maximilian Pfisterer	183	2017/2018 season (100%)	75	108	0	0	0
87	RUS	Evgeniia Lopareva / Alexey Karpushov	182	2017/2018 season (100%)	0	182	0	0	0
88	USA	Karina Manta / Joseph Johnson	164	2017/2018 season (100%)	0	0	0	164	0
88	GBR	Robynne Tweedale / Joseph Buckland	164	2017/2018 season (100%)	0	0	0	164	0
88	RUS	Vlada Solovieva / Yuri Vlasenko	164	2017/2018 season (100%)	0	0	0	164	0
91	CAN	Natalie D'Alessandro / Bruce Waddell	148	2017/2018 season (100%)	0	148	0	0	0
92	CAN	Seungyun Han / Grayson Lochhead	133	2017/2018 season (100%)	0	133	0	0	0
92	GBR	Emily Rose Brown / James Hernandez	133	2017/2018 season (100%)	0	133	0	0	0
92	UKR	Olga Giglava / Yegor Yegorov	133	2017/2018 season (100%)	0	133	0	0	0
95	USA	Isabella Amoia / Luca Becker	120	2017/2018 season (100%)	0	120	0	0	0
95	CAN	Valerie Taillefer / Jason Chan	120	2017/2018 season (100%)	0	120	0	0	0
95	AUS	Jessica Palfreyman / Charlton Doherty	120	2017/2018 season (100%)	0	120	0	0	0
98	CAN	Irina Galiyanova / Tommy Tang	108	2017/2018 season (100%)	0	108	0	0	0
98	CHN	Yuzhu Guo / Pengkun Zhao	108	2017/2018 season (100%)	0	108	0	0	0
98	AUS	Joanne Cho / Jake Meyer	108	2017/2018 season (100%)	0	108	0	0	0
101	AZE	Yana Buga / Georgy Pokhilyuk	103	2017/2018 season (100%)	103	0	0	0	0
102	ITA	Carolina Portesi Peroni / Michael Chrastecky	97	2017/2018 season (100%)	0	97	0	0	0
102	BLR	Adelina Zvezdova / Uladzimir Zaitsau	97	2017/2018 season (100%)	0	97	0	0	0
104	CZE	Natalie Taschlerova / Filip Taschler	83	2017/2018 season (100%)	83	0	0	0	0
105	EST	Viktoria Semenjuk / Artur Gruzdev	68	2017/2018 season (100%)	68	0	0	0	0

== World standings for synchronized skating ==
=== Season-end standings ===
The remainder of this section is a complete list, by level, published by the ISU.

==== Senior Synchronized (57 teams) ====
As of 9 April 2018

Rank	Nation	Team	Points	Season	ISU World Championships (Junior or Senior)	Selected International Competition	
Rank	Nation	Team	Points	Season	Best	Best	2nd Best
1	RUS	Team Paradise	3120	2017/2018 season (100%)	680	400	400
1	RUS	Team Paradise	3120	2016/2017 season (100%)	840	400	400
1	RUS	Team Paradise	3120	2015/2016 season (70%)	588	280	280
2	FIN	Team Marigold Ice Unity	2968	2017/2018 season (100%)	840	292	0
2	FIN	Team Marigold Ice Unity	2968	2016/2017 season (100%)	756	400	400
2	FIN	Team Marigold Ice Unity	2968	2015/2016 season (70%)	0	280	0
3	FIN	Team Rockettes	2564	2017/2018 season (100%)	0	400	324
3	FIN	Team Rockettes	2564	2016/2017 season (100%)	551	400	360
3	FIN	Team Rockettes	2564	2015/2016 season (70%)	529	280	252
4	USA	Team Haydenettes	2532	2017/2018 season (100%)	446	400	324
4	USA	Team Haydenettes	2532	2016/2017 season (100%)	612	360	360
4	USA	Team Haydenettes	2532	2015/2016 season (70%)	476	252	0
5	SWE	Team Surprise	2469	2017/2018 season (100%)	756	400	360
5	SWE	Team Surprise	2469	2016/2017 season (100%)	446	0	0
5	SWE	Team Surprise	2469	2015/2016 season (70%)	347	280	227
6	CAN	Team NEXXICE	2436	2017/2018 season (100%)	402	400	262
6	CAN	Team NEXXICE	2436	2016/2017 season (100%)	680	400	292
6	CAN	Team NEXXICE	2436	2015/2016 season (70%)	312	0	0
7	FIN	Team Unique	2311	2017/2018 season (100%)	612	360	360
7	FIN	Team Unique	2311	2016/2017 season (100%)	0	324	0
7	FIN	Team Unique	2311	2015/2016 season (70%)	428	227	227
8	CAN	Team Les Suprêmes Seniors	2289	2017/2018 season (100%)	551	400	0
8	CAN	Team Les Suprêmes Seniors	2289	2016/2017 season (100%)	402	360	324
8	CAN	Team Les Suprêmes Seniors	2289	2015/2016 season (70%)	386	252	204
9	GER	Team Berlin 1	1986	2017/2018 season (100%)	325	360	324
9	GER	Team Berlin 1	1986	2016/2017 season (100%)	325	360	292
9	GER	Team Berlin 1	1986	2015/2016 season (70%)	185	204	183
10	RUS	Team Tatarstan	1979	2017/2018 season (100%)	496	360	0
10	RUS	Team Tatarstan	1979	2016/2017 season (100%)	496	400	0
10	RUS	Team Tatarstan	1979	2015/2016 season (70%)	281	227	0
11	USA	Team Skyliners	1846	2017/2018 season (100%)	362	400	360
11	USA	Team Skyliners	1846	2016/2017 season (100%)	0	400	324
11	USA	Team Skyliners	1846	2015/2016 season (70%)	0	204	0
12	FRA	Team Zoulous	1605	2017/2018 season (100%)	264	262	213
12	FRA	Team Zoulous	1605	2016/2017 season (100%)	293	360	213
12	FRA	Team Zoulous	1605	2015/2016 season (70%)	205	204	183
13	SWE	Team Boomerang	1591	2017/2018 season (100%)	214	292	292
13	SWE	Team Boomerang	1591	2016/2017 season (100%)	237	262	191
13	SWE	Team Boomerang	1591	2015/2016 season (70%)	228	280	204
13	ITA	Team Hot Shivers	1591	2017/2018 season (100%)	293	262	236
13	ITA	Team Hot Shivers	1591	2016/2017 season (100%)	214	324	262
13	ITA	Team Hot Shivers	1591	2015/2016 season (70%)	166	183	165
15	HUN	Team Passion	1586	2017/2018 season (100%)	192	292	262
15	HUN	Team Passion	1586	2016/2017 season (100%)	192	324	324
15	HUN	Team Passion	1586	2015/2016 season (70%)	134	252	252
16	USA	Team Miami University	1513	2017/2018 season (100%)	0	324	324
16	USA	Team Miami University	1513	2016/2017 season (100%)	0	360	0
16	USA	Team Miami University	1513	2015/2016 season (70%)	253	252	252
17	USA	Team Dearbom Crystallettes	1420	2017/2018 season (100%)	0	236	236
17	USA	Team Dearbom Crystallettes	1420	2016/2017 season (100%)	362	324	262
17	USA	Team Dearbom Crystallettes	1420	2015/2016 season (70%)	0	149	0
18	CZE	Team Olympia	1293	2017/2018 season (100%)	173	213	191
18	CZE	Team Olympia	1293	2016/2017 season (100%)	156	262	262
18	CZE	Team Olympia	1293	2015/2016 season (70%)	121	227	204
19	SUI	Team Cool Dreams	1190	2017/2018 season (100%)	0	0	0
19	SUI	Team Cool Dreams	1190	2016/2017 season (100%)	173	262	236
19	SUI	Team Cool Dreams	1190	2015/2016 season (70%)	109	227	183
20	CRO	Team Zagreb Snowflakes	1145	2017/2018 season (100%)	140	191	0
20	CRO	Team Zagreb Snowflakes	1145	2016/2017 season (100%)	126	292	213
20	CRO	Team Zagreb Snowflakes	1145	2015/2016 season (70%)	88	183	0
21	USA	Team Adrian College	1093	2017/2018 season (100%)	0	360	292
21	USA	Team Adrian College	1093	2016/2017 season (100%)	0	292	0
21	USA	Team Adrian College	1093	2015/2016 season (70%)	0	149	0
22	GBR	Team Zariba	959	2017/2018 season (100%)	0	292	0
22	GBR	Team Zariba	959	2016/2017 season (100%)	102	324	0
22	GBR	Team Zariba	959	2015/2016 season (70%)	58	183	0
23	GER	Team Skating Graces	942	2017/2018 season (100%)	0	213	213
23	GER	Team Skating Graces	942	2016/2017 season (100%)	0	236	0
23	GER	Team Skating Graces	942	2015/2016 season (70%)	0	280	165
24	GBR	Team Wight Jewels Senior	902	2017/2018 season (100%)	0	262	0
24	GBR	Team Wight Jewels Senior	902	2016/2017 season (100%)	0	262	213
24	GBR	Team Wight Jewels Senior	902	2015/2016 season (70%)	0	165	0
25	AUS	Team Ice Storms	893	2017/2018 season (100%)	0	236	191
25	AUS	Team Ice Storms	893	2016/2017 season (100%)	0	262	191
25	AUS	Team Ice Storms	893	2015/2016 season (70%)	0	204	0
26	FIN	Team Revolutions	876	2017/2018 season (100%)	0	0	0
26	FIN	Team Revolutions	876	2016/2017 season (100%)	0	292	236
26	FIN	Team Revolutions	876	2015/2016 season (70%)	0	183	165
27	NED	Team Illumination	802	2017/2018 season (100%)	126	292	292
27	NED	Team Illumination	802	2016/2017 season (100%)	92	0	0
27	NED	Team Illumination	802	2015/2016 season (70%)	0	0	0
28	JPN	Team Jingu Ice Messengers Grace	792	2017/2018 season (100%)	0	213	0
28	JPN	Team Jingu Ice Messengers Grace	792	2016/2017 season (100%)	264	0	0
28	JPN	Team Jingu Ice Messengers Grace	792	2015/2016 season (70%)	150	165	0
28	BEL	Team Phoenix	792	2017/2018 season (100%)	156	400	236
28	BEL	Team Phoenix	792	2016/2017 season (100%)	0	0	0
28	BEL	Team Phoenix	792	2015/2016 season (70%)	0	0	0
30	GBR	Team Viola	776	2017/2018 season (100%)	92	360	324
30	GBR	Team Viola	776	2016/2017 season (100%)	0	0	0
30	GBR	Team Viola	776	2015/2016 season (70%)	0	0	0
31	USA	Team Starlight	760	2017/2018 season (100%)	0	360	0
31	USA	Team Starlight	760	2016/2017 season (100%)	0	400	0
31	USA	Team Starlight	760	2015/2016 season (70%)	0	0	0
32	GBR	Team Spirit	687	2017/2018 season (100%)	0	0	0
32	GBR	Team Spirit	687	2016/2017 season (100%)	0	292	191
32	GBR	Team Spirit	687	2015/2016 season (70%)	0	204	0
33	USA	Team Del Sol	640	2017/2018 season (100%)	0	0	0
33	USA	Team Del Sol	640	2016/2017 season (100%)	0	360	0
33	USA	Team Del Sol	640	2015/2016 season (70%)	0	280	0
34	LAT	Team Amber	608	2017/2018 season (100%)	83	324	0
34	LAT	Team Amber	608	2016/2017 season (100%)	0	0	0
34	LAT	Team Amber	608	2015/2016 season (70%)	52	149	0
35	FIN	Team Lumineers Senior	586	2017/2018 season (100%)	0	324	262
35	FIN	Team Lumineers Senior	586	2016/2017 season (100%)	0	0	0
35	FIN	Team Lumineers Senior	586	2015/2016 season (70%)	0	0	0
36	ESP	Team Fusion	489	2017/2018 season (100%)	113	0	0
36	ESP	Team Fusion	489	2016/2017 season (100%)	140	236	0
36	ESP	Team Fusion	489	2015/2016 season (70%)	71	0	0
37	NED	Team Ice United	475	2017/2018 season (100%)	0	262	0
37	NED	Team Ice United	475	2016/2017 season (100%)	0	213	0
37	NED	Team Ice United	475	2015/2016 season (70%)	0	0	0
38	SWE	Team Unity Senior	453	2017/2018 season (100%)	0	262	191
38	SWE	Team Unity Senior	453	2016/2017 season (100%)	0	0	0
38	SWE	Team Unity Senior	453	2015/2016 season (70%)	0	0	0
39	AUS	Team Nova Seniors	440	2017/2018 season (100%)	0	0	0
39	AUS	Team Nova Seniors	440	2016/2017 season (100%)	0	0	0
39	AUS	Team Nova Seniors	440	2015/2016 season (70%)	79	227	134
40	ITA	Team Flying Angels Senior	396	2017/2018 season (100%)	0	0	0
40	ITA	Team Flying Angels Senior	396	2016/2017 season (100%)	0	213	0
40	ITA	Team Flying Angels Senior	396	2015/2016 season (70%)	0	183	0
41	AUT	Team Sweet Mozart	393	2017/2018 season (100%)	74	0	0
41	AUT	Team Sweet Mozart	393	2016/2017 season (100%)	83	236	0
41	AUT	Team Sweet Mozart	393	2015/2016 season (70%)	0	0	0
42	CZE	Team Balance	298	2017/2018 season (100%)	0	0	0
42	CZE	Team Balance	298	2016/2017 season (100%)	0	0	0
42	CZE	Team Balance	298	2015/2016 season (70%)	0	149	149
43	RUS	Team Dream Team	292	2017/2018 season (100%)	0	0	0
43	RUS	Team Dream Team	292	2016/2017 season (100%)	0	292	0
43	RUS	Team Dream Team	292	2015/2016 season (70%)	0	0	0
43	CAN	Team Nova Senior	292	2017/2018 season (100%)	0	292	0
43	CAN	Team Nova Senior	292	2016/2017 season (100%)	0	0	0
43	CAN	Team Nova Senior	292	2015/2016 season (70%)	0	0	0
45	USA	Team Ice'Kateers	252	2017/2018 season (100%)	0	0	0
45	USA	Team Ice'Kateers	252	2016/2017 season (100%)	0	0	0
45	USA	Team Ice'Kateers	252	2015/2016 season (70%)	0	252	0
46	JPN	Team Jingu Ice Messengers	237	2017/2018 season (100%)	237	0	0
46	JPN	Team Jingu Ice Messengers	237	2016/2017 season (100%)	0	0	0
46	JPN	Team Jingu Ice Messengers	237	2015/2016 season (70%)	0	0	0
47	TUR	Team Vizyon	236	2017/2018 season (100%)	0	0	0
47	TUR	Team Vizyon	236	2016/2017 season (100%)	0	236	0
47	TUR	Team Vizyon	236	2015/2016 season (70%)	0	0	0
48	CAN	Team Meraki	227	2017/2018 season (100%)	0	0	0
48	CAN	Team Meraki	227	2016/2017 season (100%)	0	0	0
48	CAN	Team Meraki	227	2015/2016 season (70%)	0	227	0
49	GEO	Team Ice Lions Batumi	213	2017/2018 season (100%)	0	0	0
49	GEO	Team Ice Lions Batumi	213	2016/2017 season (100%)	0	213	0
49	GEO	Team Ice Lions Batumi	213	2015/2016 season (70%)	0	0	0
50	CZE	Team Kometa	191	2017/2018 season (100%)	0	0	0
50	CZE	Team Kometa	191	2016/2017 season (100%)	0	191	0
50	CZE	Team Kometa	191	2015/2016 season (70%)	0	0	0
51	ITA	Team Shining Blades	165	2017/2018 season (100%)	0	0	0
51	ITA	Team Shining Blades	165	2016/2017 season (100%)	0	0	0
51	ITA	Team Shining Blades	165	2015/2016 season (70%)	0	165	0
52	FRA	Team Black Diam'S Senior	149	2017/2018 season (100%)	0	0	0
52	FRA	Team Black Diam'S Senior	149	2016/2017 season (100%)	0	0	0
52	FRA	Team Black Diam'S Senior	149	2015/2016 season (70%)	0	149	0
53	AUS	Team Infusion	113	2017/2018 season (100%)	0	0	0
53	AUS	Team Infusion	113	2016/2017 season (100%)	113	0	0
53	AUS	Team Infusion	113	2015/2016 season (70%)	0	0	0
54	AUS	Team Unity	102	2017/2018 season (100%)	102	0	0
54	AUS	Team Unity	102	2016/2017 season (100%)	0	0	0
54	AUS	Team Unity	102	2015/2016 season (70%)	0	0	0
55	MEX	Team Merging Edge	98	2017/2018 season (100%)	0	0	0
55	MEX	Team Merging Edge	98	2016/2017 season (100%)	0	0	0
55	MEX	Team Merging Edge	98	2015/2016 season (70%)	98	0	0
56	TUR	Team Turquoise	74	2017/2018 season (100%)	0	0	0
56	TUR	Team Turquoise	74	2016/2017 season (100%)	74	0	0
56	TUR	Team Turquoise	74	2015/2016 season (70%)	0	0	0
57	BEL	Team Temptation	64	2017/2018 season (100%)	0	0	0
57	BEL	Team Temptation	64	2016/2017 season (100%)	0	0	0
57	BEL	Team Temptation	64	2015/2016 season (70%)	64	0	0

==== Junior Synchronized (64 teams) ====
As of 30 May 2018

Rank	Nation	Team	Points	Season	ISU World Championships (Junior or Senior)	Selected International Competition	
Rank	Nation	Team	Points	Season	Best	Best	2nd Best
1	RUS	Team Junost Junior	1950	2017/2018 season (100%)	600	250	250
1	RUS	Team Junost Junior	1950	2016/2017 season (100%)	600	250	0
1	RUS	Team Junost Junior	1950	2015/2016 season (70%)	340	0	0
2	USA	Team Skyliners Junior	1905	2017/2018 season (100%)	540	250	225
2	USA	Team Skyliners Junior	1905	2016/2017 season (100%)	437	250	203
2	USA	Team Skyliners Junior	1905	2015/2016 season (70%)	306	175	142
3	FIN	Team Fintastic Junior	1567	2017/2018 season (100%)	394	250	0
3	FIN	Team Fintastic Junior	1567	2016/2017 season (100%)	540	225	0
3	FIN	Team Fintastic Junior	1567	2015/2016 season (70%)	378	158	0
4	USA	Team Lexettes Junior	1509	2017/2018 season (100%)	354	225	203
4	USA	Team Lexettes Junior	1509	2016/2017 season (100%)	319	250	0
4	USA	Team Lexettes Junior	1509	2015/2016 season (70%)	223	158	0
5	CAN	Team Les Suprêmes Junior	1485	2017/2018 season (100%)	437	203	0
5	CAN	Team Les Suprêmes Junior	1485	2016/2017 season (100%)	354	250	0
5	CAN	Team Les Suprêmes Junior	1485	2015/2016 season (70%)	420	175	0
6	RUS	Team Crystal Ice Junior	1423	2017/2018 season (100%)	486	225	0
6	RUS	Team Crystal Ice Junior	1423	2016/2017 season (100%)	287	250	0
6	RUS	Team Crystal Ice Junior	1423	2015/2016 season (70%)	248	175	0
7	FIN	Team Musketeers Junior	1305	2017/2018 season (100%)	0	182	0
7	FIN	Team Musketeers Junior	1305	2016/2017 season (100%)	486	203	0
7	FIN	Team Musketeers Junior	1305	2015/2016 season (70%)	276	158	0
8	CAN	Team NEXXICE Junior	1267	2017/2018 season (100%)	287	203	0
8	CAN	Team NEXXICE Junior	1267	2016/2017 season (100%)	394	225	0
8	CAN	Team NEXXICE Junior	1267	2015/2016 season (70%)	201	158	0
9	SWE	Team Spirit Junior	1245	2017/2018 season (100%)	232	250	225
9	SWE	Team Spirit Junior	1245	2016/2017 season (100%)	232	148	133
9	SWE	Team Spirit Junior	1245	2015/2016 season (70%)	181	158	142
10	GER	Team Berlin Junior	1105	2017/2018 season (100%)	124	148	133
10	GER	Team Berlin Junior	1105	2016/2017 season (100%)	209	250	203
10	GER	Team Berlin Junior	1105	2015/2016 season (70%)	162	84	0
11	ITA	Team Hot Shivers Junior	1098	2017/2018 season (100%)	209	164	148
11	ITA	Team Hot Shivers Junior	1098	2016/2017 season (100%)	188	225	164
11	ITA	Team Hot Shivers Junior	1098	2015/2016 season (70%)	118	127	93
12	FRA	Team Jeanne D'Arc Junior	1044	2017/2018 season (100%)	188	203	164
12	FRA	Team Jeanne D'Arc Junior	1044	2016/2017 season (100%)	153	203	133
12	FRA	Team Jeanne D'Arc Junior	1044	2015/2016 season (70%)	0	84	0
13	SWE	Team Convivium Junior	1034	2017/2018 season (100%)	0	0	0
13	SWE	Team Convivium Junior	1034	2016/2017 season (100%)	258	225	148
13	SWE	Team Convivium Junior	1034	2015/2016 season (70%)	146	142	115
14	SUI	Team Cool Dreams Junior	1020	2017/2018 season (100%)	153	225	182
14	SUI	Team Cool Dreams Junior	1020	2016/2017 season (100%)	137	203	120
14	SUI	Team Cool Dreams Junior	1020	2015/2016 season (70%)	107	104	104
15	GBR	Team Icicles Juniors	998	2017/2018 season (100%)	169	225	182
15	GBR	Team Icicles Juniors	998	2016/2017 season (100%)	100	225	97
15	GBR	Team Icicles Juniors	998	2015/2016 season (70%)	96	68	0
16	FIN	Team Dream Edges Junior	853	2017/2018 season (100%)	319	182	0
16	FIN	Team Dream Edges Junior	853	2016/2017 season (100%)	0	225	0
16	FIN	Team Dream Edges Junior	853	2015/2016 season (70%)	0	127	0
17	CZE	Team Darlings Junior	838	2017/2018 season (100%)	137	203	133
17	CZE	Team Darlings Junior	838	2016/2017 season (100%)	169	120	0
17	CZE	Team Darlings Junior	838	2015/2016 season (70%)	132	76	0
18	SWE	Team Nova Junior	828	2017/2018 season (100%)	258	250	108
18	SWE	Team Nova Junior	828	2016/2017 season (100%)	0	108	0
18	SWE	Team Nova Junior	828	2015/2016 season (70%)	0	104	0
19	USA	Team Chicago Jazz Junior	782	2017/2018 season (100%)	0	250	164
19	USA	Team Chicago Jazz Junior	782	2016/2017 season (100%)	0	182	164
19	USA	Team Chicago Jazz Junior	782	2015/2016 season (70%)	0	175	175
20	ITA	Team Ladybirds Junior	624	2017/2018 season (100%)	0	164	148
20	ITA	Team Ladybirds Junior	624	2016/2017 season (100%)	0	164	148
20	ITA	Team Ladybirds Junior	624	2015/2016 season (70%)	0	93	0
21	USA	Team Hockettes Junior	592	2017/2018 season (100%)	0	225	203
21	USA	Team Hockettes Junior	592	2016/2017 season (100%)	0	164	0
21	USA	Team Hockettes Junior	592	2015/2016 season (70%)	0	0	0
22	RUS	Team Sunrise 1 Junior	590	2017/2018 season (100%)	0	250	0
22	RUS	Team Sunrise 1 Junior	590	2016/2017 season (100%)	0	225	0
22	RUS	Team Sunrise 1 Junior	590	2015/2016 season (70%)	0	115	0
23	FIN	Team Reflections Junior	543	2017/2018 season (100%)	0	148	0
23	FIN	Team Reflections Junior	543	2016/2017 season (100%)	0	164	0
23	FIN	Team Reflections Junior	543	2015/2016 season (70%)	0	127	104
24	FIN	Team Mystique Junior	534	2017/2018 season (100%)	0	225	0
24	FIN	Team Mystique Junior	534	2016/2017 season (100%)	0	182	0
24	FIN	Team Mystique Junior	534	2015/2016 season (70%)	0	127	0
25	ITA	Team Shining Blades Junior	528	2017/2018 season (100%)	0	133	120
25	ITA	Team Shining Blades Junior	528	2016/2017 season (100%)	0	148	120
25	ITA	Team Shining Blades Junior	528	2015/2016 season (70%)	0	127	0
26	FIN	Team Valley Bay Synchro Junior	499	2017/2018 season (100%)	0	203	0
26	FIN	Team Valley Bay Synchro Junior	499	2016/2017 season (100%)	0	203	0
26	FIN	Team Valley Bay Synchro Junior	499	2015/2016 season (70%)	0	93	0
27	AUS	Team Iceskateers Elite Juniors	494	2017/2018 season (100%)	0	148	0
27	AUS	Team Iceskateers Elite Juniors	494	2016/2017 season (100%)	0	182	164
27	AUS	Team Iceskateers Elite Juniors	494	2015/2016 season (70%)	0	0	0
27	GBR	Team Solway Stars Juniors	494	2017/2018 season (100%)	0	164	148
27	GBR	Team Solway Stars Juniors	494	2016/2017 season (100%)	0	182	0
27	GBR	Team Solway Stars Juniors	494	2015/2016 season (70%)	0	0	0
29	USA	Team Starlight	475	2017/2018 season (100%)	0	225	0
29	USA	Team Starlight	475	2016/2017 season (100%)	0	250	0
29	USA	Team Starlight	475	2015/2016 season (70%)	0	0	0
30	FIN	Team Fireblades Junior	457	2017/2018 season (100%)	0	182	0
30	FIN	Team Fireblades Junior	457	2016/2017 season (100%)	0	148	0
30	FIN	Team Fireblades Junior	457	2015/2016 season (70%)	0	127	0
31	FIN	Team Sun City Swing Junior	444	2017/2018 season (100%)	0	120	0
31	FIN	Team Sun City Swing Junior	444	2016/2017 season (100%)	0	182	0
31	FIN	Team Sun City Swing Junior	444	2015/2016 season (70%)	0	142	0
32	ITA	Team Ice Diamonds Junior	434	2017/2018 season (100%)	0	133	0
32	ITA	Team Ice Diamonds Junior	434	2016/2017 season (100%)	0	133	0
32	ITA	Team Ice Diamonds Junior	434	2015/2016 season (70%)	0	84	84
33	FIN	Team Stella Polaris Junior	419	2017/2018 season (100%)	0	182	0
33	FIN	Team Stella Polaris Junior	419	2016/2017 season (100%)	0	133	0
33	FIN	Team Stella Polaris Junior	419	2015/2016 season (70%)	0	104	0
34	CRO	Team Zagreb Snowflakes Junior	408	2017/2018 season (100%)	100	97	0
34	CRO	Team Zagreb Snowflakes Junior	408	2016/2017 season (100%)	0	133	0
34	CRO	Team Zagreb Snowflakes Junior	408	2015/2016 season (70%)	78	0	0
35	ESP	Team Mirum Junior	393	2017/2018 season (100%)	90	108	0
35	ESP	Team Mirum Junior	393	2016/2017 season (100%)	111	0	0
35	ESP	Team Mirum Junior	393	2015/2016 season (70%)	70	84	0
36	FIN	Team Ice Steps Junior	368	2017/2018 season (100%)	0	133	0
36	FIN	Team Ice Steps Junior	368	2016/2017 season (100%)	0	120	0
36	FIN	Team Ice Steps Junior	368	2015/2016 season (70%)	0	115	0
37	FIN	Team Ice Infinity Junior	351	2017/2018 season (100%)	0	203	0
37	FIN	Team Ice Infinity Junior	351	2016/2017 season (100%)	0	148	0
37	FIN	Team Ice Infinity Junior	351	2015/2016 season (70%)	0	0	0
38	CAN	Team Les Pirouettes De Laval Junior	318	2017/2018 season (100%)	0	0	0
38	CAN	Team Les Pirouettes De Laval Junior	318	2016/2017 season (100%)	0	203	0
38	CAN	Team Les Pirouettes De Laval Junior	318	2015/2016 season (70%)	0	115	0
39	USA	Team Fond du Lac Blades Junior	306	2017/2018 season (100%)	0	164	0
39	USA	Team Fond du Lac Blades Junior	306	2016/2017 season (100%)	0	0	0
39	USA	Team Fond du Lac Blades Junior	306	2015/2016 season (70%)	0	142	0
40	ITA	Team Ice On Fire Junior	297	2017/2018 season (100%)	0	0	0
40	ITA	Team Ice On Fire Junior	297	2016/2017 season (100%)	0	182	0
40	ITA	Team Ice On Fire Junior	297	2015/2016 season (70%)	0	115	0
41	SWE	Team Moonlights Junior	287	2017/2018 season (100%)	0	0	0
41	SWE	Team Moonlights Junior	287	2016/2017 season (100%)	0	97	97
41	SWE	Team Moonlights Junior	287	2015/2016 season (70%)	0	93	0
42	FRA	Team Zazou Junior	273	2017/2018 season (100%)	0	97	0
42	FRA	Team Zazou Junior	273	2016/2017 season (100%)	0	108	0
42	FRA	Team Zazou Junior	273	2015/2016 season (70%)	0	68	0
43	FRA	Team Black Diam'S Junior	272	2017/2018 season (100%)	0	164	108
43	FRA	Team Black Diam'S Junior	272	2016/2017 season (100%)	0	0	0
43	FRA	Team Black Diam'S Junior	272	2015/2016 season (70%)	0	0	0
44	POL	Team Ice Fire Junior	263	2017/2018 season (100%)	81	182	0
44	POL	Team Ice Fire Junior	263	2016/2017 season (100%)	0	0	0
44	POL	Team Ice Fire Junior	263	2015/2016 season (70%)	0	0	0
45	RUS	Team Idel Junior	250	2017/2018 season (100%)	0	250	0
45	RUS	Team Idel Junior	250	2016/2017 season (100%)	0	0	0
45	RUS	Team Idel Junior	250	2015/2016 season (70%)	0	0	0
46	SWE	Team Seaside Junior	240	2017/2018 season (100%)	0	120	120
46	SWE	Team Seaside Junior	240	2016/2017 season (100%)	0	0	0
46	SWE	Team Seaside Junior	240	2015/2016 season (70%)	0	0	0
47	AUS	Team Majestic Ice Junior	235	2017/2018 season (100%)	111	0	0
47	AUS	Team Majestic Ice Junior	235	2016/2017 season (100%)	124	0	0
47	AUS	Team Majestic Ice Junior	235	2015/2016 season (70%)	0	0	0
48	NED	Team Illuminettes Junior	227	2017/2018 season (100%)	0	164	0
48	NED	Team Illuminettes Junior	227	2016/2017 season (100%)	0	0	0
48	NED	Team Illuminettes Junior	227	2015/2016 season (70%)	63	0	0
49	RUS	Team Zhemchuzina Junior	203	2017/2018 season (100%)	0	203	0
49	RUS	Team Zhemchuzina Junior	203	2016/2017 season (100%)	0	0	0
49	RUS	Team Zhemchuzina Junior	203	2015/2016 season (70%)	0	0	0
50	GER	Team Starlets Junior 2	175	2017/2018 season (100%)	0	0	0
50	GER	Team Starlets Junior 2	175	2016/2017 season (100%)	0	0	0
50	GER	Team Starlets Junior 2	175	2015/2016 season (70%)	0	175	0
51	FRA	Team Chrysalides Junior	164	2017/2018 season (100%)	0	0	0
51	FRA	Team Chrysalides Junior	164	2016/2017 season (100%)	0	164	0
51	FRA	Team Chrysalides Junior	164	2015/2016 season (70%)	0	0	0
52	TUR	Team Golden Roses Junior	163	2017/2018 season (100%)	73	0	0
52	TUR	Team Golden Roses Junior	163	2016/2017 season (100%)	90	0	0
52	TUR	Team Golden Roses Junior	163	2015/2016 season (70%)	0	0	0
53	CZE	Team Starlets Junior	158	2017/2018 season (100%)	0	0	0
53	CZE	Team Starlets Junior	158	2016/2017 season (100%)	0	0	0
53	CZE	Team Starlets Junior	158	2015/2016 season (70%)	0	158	0
54	HUN	Team Mixed Ice Formation Junior	142	2017/2018 season (100%)	0	0	0
54	HUN	Team Mixed Ice Formation Junior	142	2016/2017 season (100%)	0	0	0
54	HUN	Team Mixed Ice Formation Junior	142	2015/2016 season (70%)	0	142	0
55	KOR	Team Angels Junior	120	2017/2018 season (100%)	0	120	0
55	KOR	Team Angels Junior	120	2016/2017 season (100%)	0	0	0
55	KOR	Team Angels Junior	120	2015/2016 season (70%)	0	0	0
55	KOR	Team Blessing Junior	120	2017/2018 season (100%)	0	120	0
55	KOR	Team Blessing Junior	120	2016/2017 season (100%)	0	0	0
55	KOR	Team Blessing Junior	120	2015/2016 season (70%)	0	0	0
55	AUS	Team Southern Sky Junior	120	2017/2018 season (100%)	0	120	0
55	AUS	Team Southern Sky Junior	120	2016/2017 season (100%)	0	0	0
55	AUS	Team Southern Sky Junior	120	2015/2016 season (70%)	0	0	0
58	HUN	Team Magic Junior	108	2017/2018 season (100%)	0	108	0
58	HUN	Team Magic Junior	108	2016/2017 season (100%)	0	0	0
58	HUN	Team Magic Junior	108	2015/2016 season (70%)	0	0	0
59	ITA	Team Flying Angels Junior	97	2017/2018 season (100%)	0	97	0
59	ITA	Team Flying Angels Junior	97	2016/2017 season (100%)	0	0	0
59	ITA	Team Flying Angels Junior	97	2015/2016 season (70%)	0	0	0
60	SUI	Team United Blades Juniors	93	2017/2018 season (100%)	0	0	0
60	SUI	Team United Blades Juniors	93	2016/2017 season (100%)	0	0	0
60	SUI	Team United Blades Juniors	93	2015/2016 season (70%)	0	93	0
61	HUN	Team Diamond Laces Frostwork Junior	87	2017/2018 season (100%)	0	0	0
61	HUN	Team Diamond Laces Frostwork Junior	87	2016/2017 season (100%)	0	0	0
61	HUN	Team Diamond Laces Frostwork Junior	87	2015/2016 season (70%)	87	0	0
62	FRA	Team Cometes Junior	76	2017/2018 season (100%)	0	0	0
62	FRA	Team Cometes Junior	76	2016/2017 season (100%)	0	0	0
62	FRA	Team Cometes Junior	76	2015/2016 season (70%)	0	76	0
62	CHN	Team C-Star Junior	76	2017/2018 season (100%)	0	0	0
62	CHN	Team C-Star Junior	76	2016/2017 season (100%)	0	0	0
62	CHN	Team C-Star Junior	76	2015/2016 season (70%)	0	76	0
64	TUR	Team Anatolia Junior	57	2017/2018 season (100%)	0	0	0
64	TUR	Team Anatolia Junior	57	2016/2017 season (100%)	0	0	0
64	TUR	Team Anatolia Junior	57	2015/2016 season (70%)	57	0	0

== See also ==
- 2017–18 ISU Season's World Ranking
- ISU World Standings
- ISU Season's World Ranking
- 2017–18 figure skating season
- 2017–18 synchronized skating season
