= Nathan Chen =

American figure skater (born 1999)

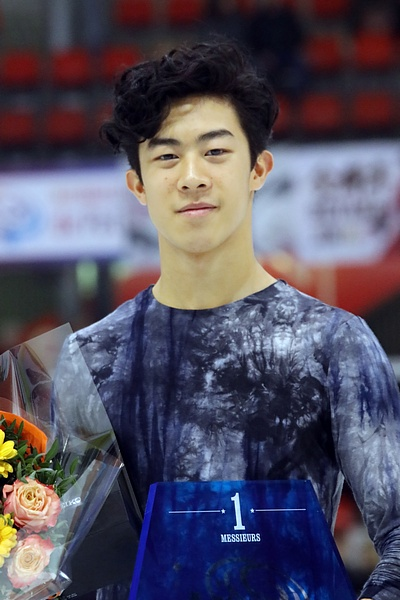
- Chen at 2018 Internationaux de France
- Born: Nathan Wei Chen; May 5, 1999 (age 27); Salt Lake City, Utah, U.S.
- Education: Yale University (BA) Harvard University
- Occupations: Figure skater; Medical student
- Height: 5 ft 6 in (168 cm)

Nathan Chen article series
- Skating career: Career achievements; Awards; Competition results; List of programs
- Figure skating career
- Country: United States
- Discipline: Men's singles
- Began skating: 2003
- Competitive: 2007–2022
- Professional: 2022–present
- Highest WS: 1st (2018–2022)

Medal record
Event	Gold medal – first place	Silver medal – second place	Bronze medal – third place
Olympic Games	2	0	1
World Championships	3	0	0
Four Continents Championships	1	0	0
Grand Prix Final	3	1	0
U.S. Championships	6	0	1
World Team Trophy	1	1	1
World Junior Championships	0	0	1
Junior Grand Prix Final	1	0	1
Medal list
Olympic Games
Gold medal – first place	2022 Beijing	Singles
Gold medal – first place	2022 Beijing	Team
Bronze medal – third place	2018 Pyeongchang	Team
World Championships
Gold medal – first place	2018 Milan	Singles
Gold medal – first place	2019 Saitama	Singles
Gold medal – first place	2021 Stockholm	Singles
Four Continents Championships
Gold medal – first place	2017 Gangneung	Singles
Grand Prix Final
Gold medal – first place	2017–18 Nagoya	Singles
Gold medal – first place	2018–19 Vancouver	Singles
Gold medal – first place	2019–20 Turin	Singles
Silver medal – second place	2016–17 Marseille	Singles
U.S. Championships
Gold medal – first place	2017 Kansas City	Singles
Gold medal – first place	2018 San Jose	Singles
Gold medal – first place	2019 Detroit	Singles
Gold medal – first place	2020 Greensboro	Singles
Gold medal – first place	2021 Las Vegas	Singles
Gold medal – first place	2022 Nashville	Singles
Bronze medal – third place	2016 Greensboro	Singles
World Team Trophy
Gold medal – first place	2019 Fukuoka	Team
Silver medal – second place	2021 Osaka	Team
Bronze medal – third place	2017 Tokyo	Team
World Junior Championships
Bronze medal – third place	2014 Sofia	Singles
Junior Grand Prix Final
Gold medal – first place	2015–16 Barcelona	Singles
Bronze medal – third place	2013–14 Fukuoka	Singles

Chinese name
- Traditional Chinese: 陳巍
- Simplified Chinese: 陈巍
Transcriptions
Standard Mandarin
- Hanyu Pinyin: Chén Wēi

Nathan Wei Chen (born May 5, 1999) is an American figure skater. He is the 2022 Olympic champion in both the men's singles and team event, a three-time World champion (2018, 2019, 2021), the 2017 Four Continents champion, a three-time Grand Prix Final champion (2017, 2018, 2019), a ten-time Grand Prix medalist (8 gold, 1 silver, 1 bronze), the 2018 Olympic bronze medalist in the team event, and a six-time U.S. national champion (2017–22). At the junior level, Chen is the 2015–16 Junior Grand Prix Final champion, 2013–14 Junior Grand Prix Final bronze medalist, 2014 World Junior bronze medalist, and a six-time Junior Grand Prix medalist (5 gold, 1 silver). He became the youngest skater to win a U.S. Championship at the novice level in 2010, at age ten, a title he successfully defended the following season.

Chen, who has been referred to as one of the greatest men's figure skaters of all time by various news outlets, holds the highest winning percentage in competitions in the modern era with a more-than-three-year winning streak from 2018 to 2021. (Note: Various news outlets have referred to Chen as one of the greatest figure skaters of all time and have described his consistency in the 2018–2022 quadrennial as one of the most dominant four year stretches the sport has seen. See:) Chen is renowned for performing some of the most technically challenging programs in the world and is acclaimed for surpassing the expected athletic standards in the sport. He is known as the "Quad King" for his mastery of quadruple jumps. Chen is the first skater to have successfully landed each of the five reverse take-off quadruple jumps (Lutz, flip, loop, Salchow, and toeloop) in competition with a positive grade of execution. He has broken world and national records, and is the current world record holder for men in the short program and combined total score, and former world record holder in the free skate under the ISU Judging System. He currently holds the highest total scores of three major ISU competitions: the Olympics, the Four Continent Championships, and the Grand Prix Final. Chen is the first Asian American man to win U.S., world, and Olympic titles in single skating. At age 17, Chen became the youngest U.S. champion since Dick Button (1946), and in 2022 became the first man to win six consecutive U.S. titles since Button (1946–52). When Chen won the 2018 World Championships, he became the youngest World Champion since Evgeni Plushenko (2001). In 2021, he became the first U.S. man to win three consecutive world titles since Scott Hamilton (1982–1984). He is the first single figure skater to win both team and singles gold medals in the same Olympic games (2022).

After his gold medal-winning performance at the 2022 Winter Olympics, Chen was named Most Valuable Skater at the 2023 edition of the International Skating Union's ISU Skating Awards and earned a nomination for a Laureus World Sports Award. In 2022, he appeared in Time magazine's list of the 100 most-influential people in the world and was announced as one of Harper's Bazaar's Icons. Chen was included in Forbes's 2020 30 under 30 Sports list. Chen has written two books: his memoir One Jump at a Time: My Story and the children's book Wei Skates On.

== Early life and family ==
Nathan Wei Chen was born in Salt Lake City, Utah, to Chinese immigrant parents. His father, Zhidong Chen, was a research scientist from Guangxi, China, and his mother, Hetty Wang, was from Beijing, China. He has four older siblings: Alice, Tony, Colin and Janice Chen, who worked for the Jennifer Doudna lab and co-founded Mammoth Biosciences. Chen's mother financed his skating activities, as well as the pursuits of his siblings, by working as a medical translator and cleaning houses. He aspired to become a hockey goalkeeper after watching his older brothers play hockey, but his mother gave him figure skates.

To improve his coordination and strength and supplement his skating, Chen's mother enrolled him in gymnastics and ballet classes. He trained with Ballet West Academy for more than six years and competed at state level in gymnastics, placing first in the all-around at the Utah Boys' State Gymnastics Championships in St. George in 2008. As a child, Chen also trained as a pianist and won local competitions in his age group and later learned to play guitar as an extracurricular activity. According to Chen, he comes from "a huge chess family"—his siblings competed as children in chess tournaments—but, he says, he is less skilled in the game than the rest of his family.

== Competitive skating career ==
=== Early career ===
Nathan Chen was part of an increase in the number of infant skaters following the 2002 Winter Olympics in his home town. He started skating at the age of three in a beginners' class at the Salt Lake City Sports Complex, which served as a practice rink during the Olympics. He entered his first figure-skating competition in 2003. When he was seven, Chen started competing at the juvenile and intermediate levels in the U.S. Junior Figure Skating Championships, placing 10th at the juvenile boys' level in 2007; in the same competition, he won bronze in the juvenile boys' division in 2008 and the intermediate men's silver medal in 2009.

Progressing to novice level in the 2009–2010 season, Chen competed at the 2010 U.S. Senior Championships in Spokane, becoming the youngest U.S. novice men's champion in history at the age of 10. He remained at the novice level for the 2010–2011 season and became the first male skater to retain the U.S. novice champion at the 2011 U.S. Championships in Greensboro, finishing almost 36 points ahead of his nearest competitor. Chen debuted as at the junior level in the 2011–12 season, and won his first national junior men's title at the 2012 U.S. Championships in San Jose. At his first international appearance, Chen won the novice men's event at the 2012 Gardena Spring Trophy in Italy.

Chen had started working with former Czechoslovak skater Karel Kovář, who used to train with Russian coach Alexei Mishin and taught Chen to pull his arms across his torso in a "seat belt" position when he rotated, a position Chen still uses. Kovar introduced Chen to fellow Czechoslovak skater Jozef Sabovčík nicknamed "Jumping Joe". Sabovčík was the first coach who told Chen not to stop in the middle of a program during a run-through. Chen worked with Kovar until age nine, and had begun taking lessons from Evgenia Chernyshyova, who was local to Salt Lake City and more easily accessible.

When Chen started working with jump specialist Rafael Arutyunyan when he was 10, he and his mother drove from Salt Lake City to Lake Arrowhead, California, several times a year. The family did not have much money to spend on skates, lessons, and competition costumes so Chen and his mother sometimes slept in their car. At age 11 Chen told his mother he should move to further his career, and Chen and his mother relocated to Southern California. Arutyunyan became his main coach in 2011.

=== Junior career ===
Chen became eligible to compete in the ISU Junior Grand Prix in 2012–2013 and made his debut in Austria, where he won the title with the combined total score of 222.00 with 37 points to spare. He withdrew from his second event in Croatia after sustaining a lower leg injury but won the junior men's bronze medal at the 2013 U.S. Championships. In 2013–2014, Chen was placed first at both Grand Prix assignments in Mexico and Belarus, and qualified for the 2013 Junior Grand Prix Final, where he finished third. He won his second U.S. junior title with a record short-program score of 79.61 and a record cumulative score of 223.93 at the 2014 U.S. Championships, and won bronze at the 2014 World Junior Championships a few months later.

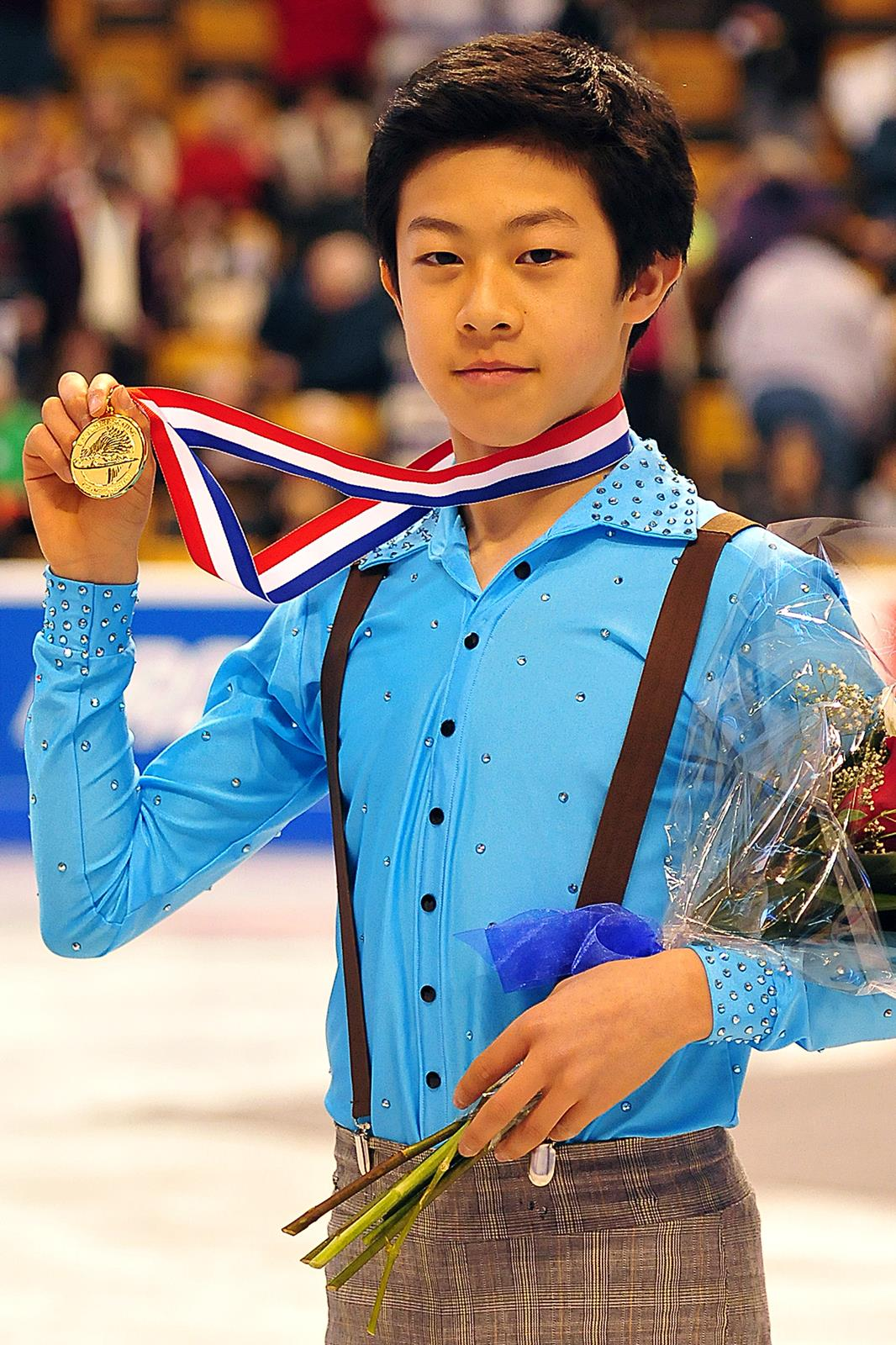
Chen at the junior men's medal ceremony at the 2014 U.S. Championships

Chen was often injured during the 2014–2015 season, and was only healthy enough to compete at one Grand Prix event in Croatia, where he finished second behind Shoma Uno. Chen debuted as a senior in the U.S. at the 2015 Pacific Sectional Championships, which he won, and advanced to the 2015 U.S. Championship. A week before the championship, Chen developed a growth-related heel injury and competed with modified versions of both programs, placing eighth overall. After nationals, Chen was assigned to the 2015 World Junior Championships, where he finished fourth. In 2015–2016, Chen took first place in the Junior Grand Prix Final after winning both Grand Prix events in Colorado Springs, Colorado. and Logroño. At the 2016 U.S. Championships, Chen became the first U.S. man to land two quadruple jumps in a short program, and the first U.S. man to land four quadruple jumps in a free skate. He finished third overall behind Adam Rippon and Max Aaron; Rippon did not attempt any quads and Aaron landed two, restarting the long-standing debate over whether artistry should trump athleticism. While attempting a quadruple toe loop in the exhibition, Chen sustained an avulsion injury to his left hip and underwent surgery. He withdrew from the 2016 World Junior Championships and the 2016 World Championships. After a month of rehabilitation at the U.S. Olympic Training Center in Chula Vista, he went to the U.S. Olympic Training Center in Colorado Springs to work with strength-and-conditioning specialists, and continued his rehabilitation. Chen resumed full training around July.

=== Senior career ===
==== 2016–2017 season: Senior international debut, Four Continents title and first senior national title ====
In preparation for his senior international debut, Nathan Chen worked on a new short program with Marina Zoueva, while Zoueva and Oleg Epstein coached him in Canton, Michigan. Chen opened the pre-Olympic season at the 2016 CS Finlandia Trophy, winning gold ahead of Patrick Chan. At his senior Grand Prix debut at the 2016 Trophée de France, he landed clean quadruple Lutz and triple-toe combinations and clean quadruple flips in both segments. He received 92.85 points for the short program, breaking Evan Lysacek's U.S. record of 90.30. Chen placed fourth overall and returned to California to work with Rafael Arutyunyan before the NHK Trophy, where he finished second behind Olympic champion Yuzuru Hanyu. Chen opened the 2016–2017 Grand Prix Final, placing fifth in the short program. He won the free skate with a performance that included four quadruple jumps, earning a combined score of 282.85 points, coming second to Hanyu. At 17, he became the second-youngest man to win a medal at a Grand Prix Final after Evgeni Plushenko, who was 16 in 1999.

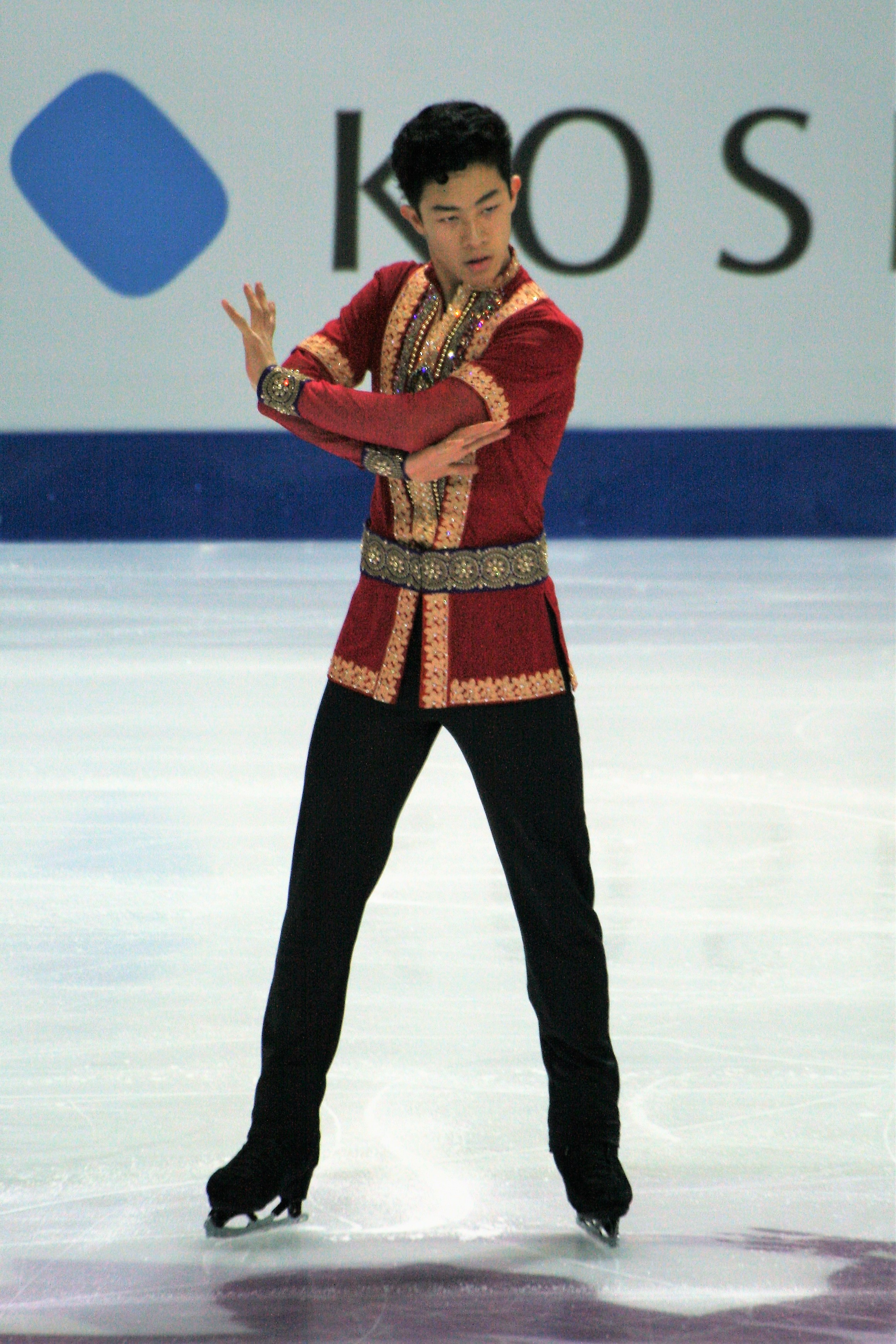
Chen at the 2016 Grand Prix Final

At the 2017 U.S. Championships in Kansas City, Chen performed two quadruple jumps in the short program and became the first skater to land five clean quadruple jumps in a free skate. He won his first senior U.S. title with record scores of 106.39 in the short program, 212.08 in the free skate, and 318.47 overall to become the youngest champion in more than 50 years. A few weeks later, Chen won the 2017 Four Continents Championships. He scored 103.12 in the short program, 204.34 in the free skate, and 307.46 in combined total, exceeding 100 (short program), 200 (free skate), and 300 (combined total) for the first time in his career, and became the youngest Four Continents men's champion in history until Kao Miura in 2023. At the 2017 World Championships, Chen's boots had begun to fall apart, but he felt his back-up boots were too new and decided to try to repair the old ones with duct tape and hockey laces. Chen finished sixth overall, saying, "It wasn't at all the program I wanted to do. I made a whole bunch of mistakes". Chen's placement, combined with his teammate Jason Brown's seventh-place finish, ensured Team USA would be able to send three men to the 2018 Winter Olympics. Chen ended the season at the 2017 World Team Trophy, where he finished second in the short program and fourth in the free skate. The U.S. team finished third overall.

==== 2017–2018 season: Pyeongchang Olympics and first World title ====
Chen's first competition in the Olympic season was the 2017 CS U.S. International Figure Skating Classic. Working with choreographers Shae-Lynn Bourne and Lori Nichol, he debuted a short-program set to "Nemesis" and a free skate with music from Mao's Last Dancer. In the free skate, he landed his first quadruple loop to become the first skater to land five different quads in competition. After placing first in the short program and second in the free skate at 2017 Rostelecom Cup, Chen defeated Yuzuru Hanyu to win his first Grand Prix title. At 2017 Skate America, Chen secured his second title, finishing ahead of teammate Adam Rippon. With the two wins, Chen earned the top qualifying spot for the 2017–18 Grand Prix Final, where he had a narrow win over Shoma Uno. Chen became the first U.S. man to win the final since Evan Lysacek in 2009. At the 2018 U.S. Championships, which served as trials for the Olympics, Chen performed seven clean quadruple jumps—two in the short program and five in the free skate—to win his second consecutive national title. Chen, Adam Rippon, and Vincent Zhou were named to the Olympic Team.

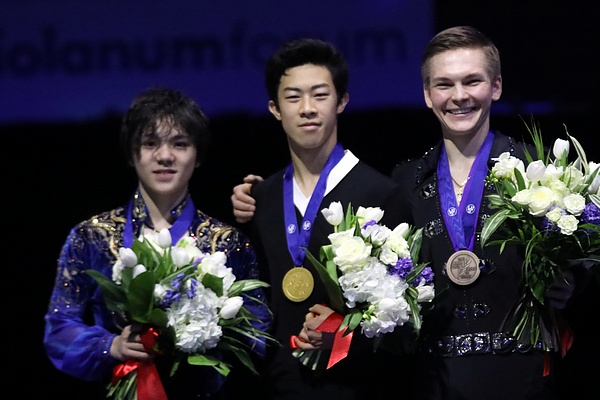
Chen (center) with Shoma Uno (left) and Mikhail Kolyada (right) at the 2018 Worlds medal ceremony

At the 2018 Winter Olympics in Pyeongchang, South Korea, Chen performed his short program in the team event poorly and placed fourth, but won bronze alongside his teammates. A week later, Chen had another disappointing performance in the men's individual short program and finished 17th heading into the free skate. Afterward he said, "Honestly, it was bad ... I made as many mistakes as I possibly could have". Chen placed first in the free skate with a new personal best score of 215.08, and became the first skater to land six quads in a free skate, and finished fifth overall. Chen caught influenza and withdrew early from the gala to avoid infecting other athletes. A month later, Chen won his first world title at the 2018 World Championships, finishing first in both programs. He became the first skater to land eight quadruple jumps in a single competition—two in the short program and six in the free skate. He became the first U.S. man to win the World Championships since Evan Lysacek in 2009 and the youngest world champion since Evgeni Plushenko in 2001. His margin of victory over silver medalist Shoma Uno (47.63 points) was the greatest at a World Championships, Olympic Winter Games, and Grand Prix Final under the historical ISU Judging System (IJS). In early 2018, Chen was accepted into Yale University.

==== 2018–2019 season: Second consecutive World title ====
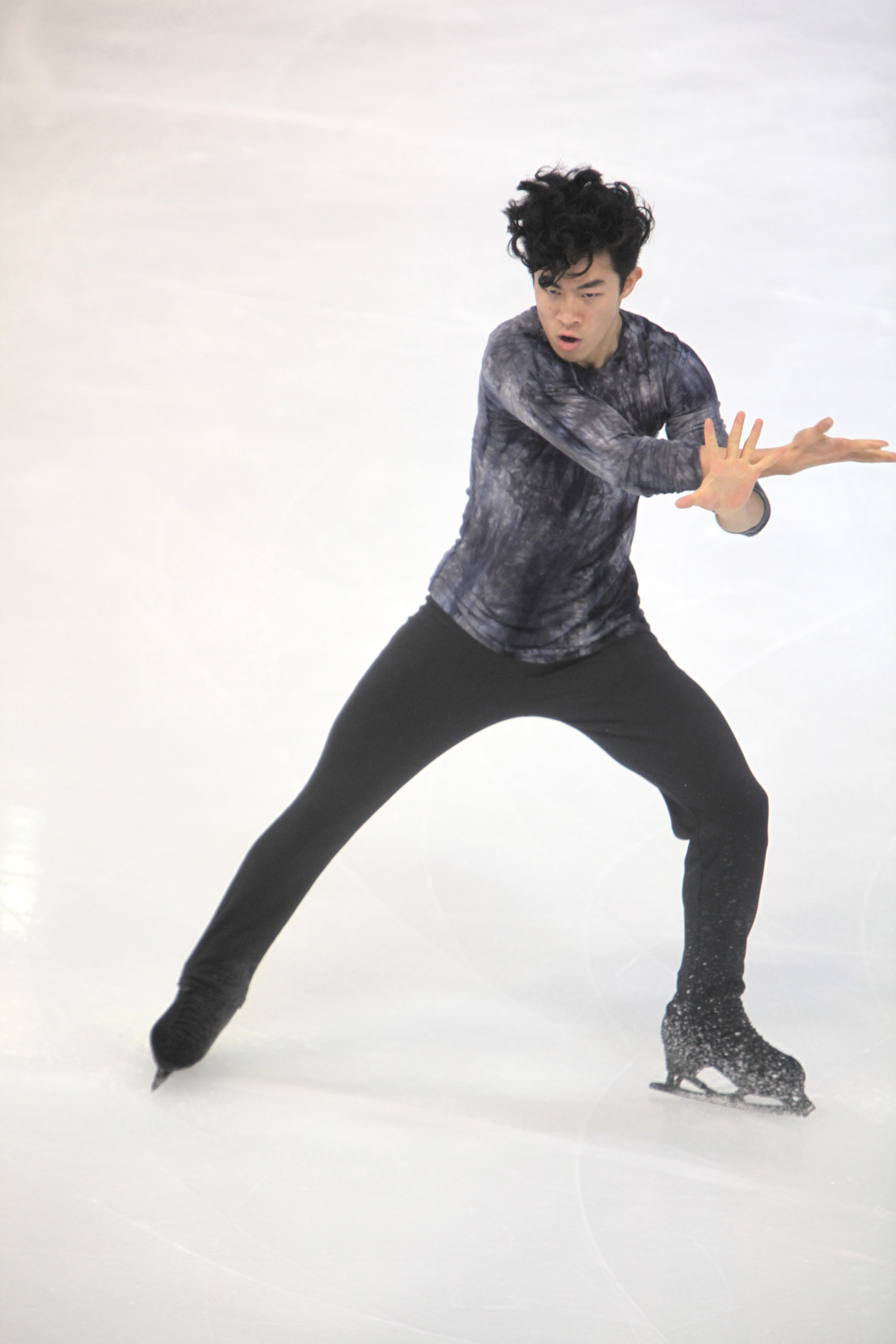
Chen during his free skate at the 2018 Internationaux de France

Chen's first competition as a full-time college student was the Japan Open, where he skated alongside Jeremy Abbott, Bradie Tennell, and Mariah Bell. He finished fourth in the free skate and Team North America finished third overall. At 2018 Skate America, Chen skated to "Caravan" by Fanfare Ciocărlia in his short program and to "Land of All" by Woodkid during his free skate. He won both segments and defended his title, winning by the largest point margin in the competition's history. At the 2018 Internationaux de France, Chen fell on his quadruple flip in the short program and entered the free skate in third place behind Jason Brown. He recovered and won the event with a total score of 271.58. At the 2018–19 Grand Prix Final, Chen won the short program and the free skate—though he made some mistakes—to win his second Grand Prix Final. With the win, Chen became the fourth man to win consecutive Grand Prix Final titles since the event debuted in 1995. At the 2019 U.S. Championships in Detroit, Chen received a record score of 113.42 for a two-quad short program and a record score of 228.80 for a four-quad free skate, ending with a record combined score of 342.22 points. He won the championship by 58.21 points over Vincent Zhou in second place and became the first man to win three consecutive national titles since Johnny Weir in 2004–2006.

Competing at the 2019 World Championships in Saitama during Yale's spring break, Chen defended his world title and broke the world record for the free skate and total score, with 216.02 and 323.42 points respectively. He won the championship by 22.45 points over Yuzuru Hanyu, becoming the first U.S. man to win back-to-back world titles since Scott Hamilton (1981–1984). With teammate Vincent Zhou winning bronze, two Americans stood on the men's podium at Worlds for the first time since 1996. Chen traveled back to Japan to conclude his season at the 2019 World Team Trophy, where he won both segments; Team USA placed first.

==== 2019–2020 season: Third consecutive Grand Prix Final title ====
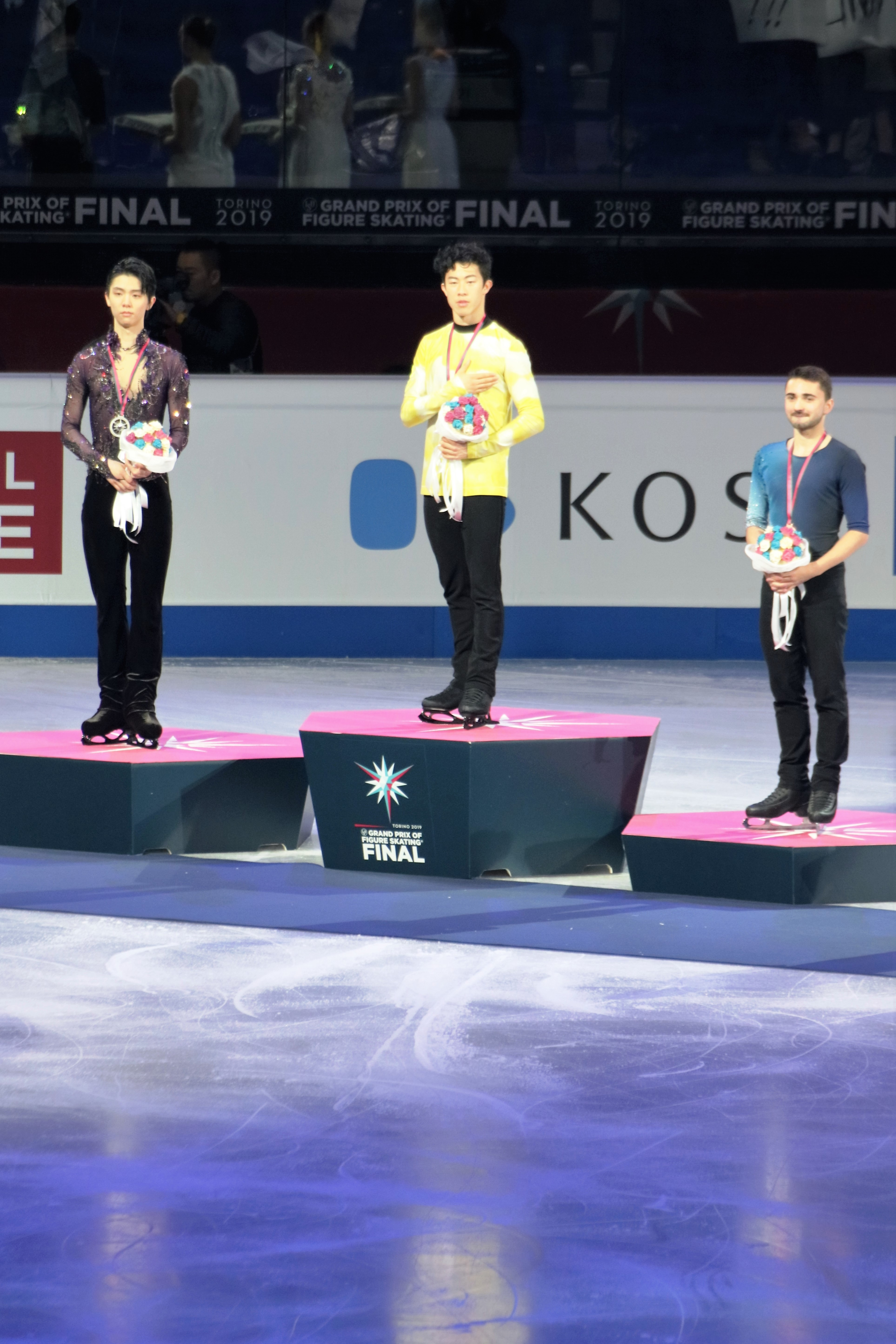
Chen (center) with Yuzuru Hanyu (left) and Kévin Aymoz (right) at the 2019–20 Grand Prix Final podium

Chen opened his 2019–2020 season by winning the free skate in the men's event at the Japan Open, contributing to Team North America's bronze-medal finish. He went on to defend his title at 2019 Skate America in Las Vegas, becoming the first person to win Skate America three times consecutively since Todd Eldredge, who won four times from 1994 to 1997. Chen's 44-point margin of victory was the largest in the event's history. Two weeks later, Chen won his second consecutive Internationaux de France title in Grenoble. He became the first singles skater since Evgeni Plushenko to win eight consecutive Grand Prix events.

At the 2019–2020 Grand Prix Final in Turin, Chen and Yuzuru Hanyu were expected to compete for gold and silver. Chen had a clean short program and a new personal-best score of 110.38, 0.15 short of Hanyu's world record at the time. He went on to set new highest scores of 224.92 in the free skate and 335.30 in the combined total, breaking his own world records in both segments, winning the title with 43.87 points over Hanyu. While suffering from influenza, Chen resumed training less than two weeks before the 2020 U.S. Championships, where he won his fourth national title with a new U.S. national short program record of 114.13, and became the first man to win four consecutive U.S. men's titles since Olympic champion Brian Boitano in 1988. Chen was assigned to compete at the World Championships in Montreal but the event was canceled as a result of the COVID-19 pandemic.

==== 2020–2021 season: Third consecutive World title ====
With the pandemic ongoing, skaters were largely assigned to the 2020–2021 Grand Prix based on geographic location; Chen was set to compete at Skate America. Despite popping two planned jumps in the free skate, he won both the short program and the free skate with a total score of 299.15. Afterward, speaking to Olympic Channel, Chen said he was taking a break from school to focus on skating and the 2022 Winter Olympics; he said, "[The Olympics] are the end goal ... It's the driving force behind a lot of what we do and a lot of the decisions that we make". At the 2021 U.S. Championships, Chen won his fifth-consecutive national title, becoming the first man to win five consecutive titles since Dick Button, whom Chen cited as inspiration, saying:

It's incredible to try to follow in his footsteps ... It means the world. Dick is a true skating icon, and it just feels incredible to be trying to chase something that someone like that has done. I'm nowhere near the level he was at, but it's just cool to be able to be even mentioned in his sort of realm of legendness.

At the 2021 World Championships in Stockholm, Chen placed third after the short program, in which he fell on his quadruple Lutz, with a score of 98.85. He skated a clean free skate with five quads and finished first with a score of 222.03. He won his third consecutive world title with a cumulative score of 320.88, and became the first man since Patrick Chan (2011–13) and the first American since Scott Hamilton (1982–84) to win three world titles in a row. In a post-competition interview, Chen said he felt he had grown since the 2018 Winter Olympics when he was in 17th place after the short program: "I think having had that experience now going into this competition, it definitely helps me retain some resiliency, I think. And I think that definitely, you know, thankfully came into play today." Chen finished his season at the 2021 World Team Trophy in Osaka, where he placed first in both segments and Team USA finished second overall.

==== 2021–2022 season: Olympic gold medal ====
Chen began the Olympic season at 2021 Skate America, where he placed fourth in the short program. He fell on his first quadruple jump and a poor landing on the second quadruple jump left him unable to execute the required two-jump combination. He placed second in the free skate despite doubling two of his six planned quads, finishing in third place overall behind Vincent Zhou and Shoma Uno. Speaking about the end of his undefeated run since the 2018 World Championships, Chen said: "it's not devastating. It was inevitably going to end as a winning streak at some point in time, and I am really proud of these guys up here". Chen recovered a week later at 2021 Skate Canada International, where he won both segments to win the competition with a 47.63-point margin over silver medalist Jason Brown. Chen's results secured him a place in the 2021–22 Grand Prix Final. which was subsequently canceled due to restrictions prompted by the SARS-CoV-2 Omicron variant. At the end of November, Chen engaged Massimo Scali to help finalize the presentation of his Olympic programs. After initially skating to Benjamin Clementine's "Eternity" and a Mozart medley, he had decided to return to his "La Bohème" short program and Rocketman free skate from 2019–20 but was unable to work with choreographer Marie-France Dubreull in person due to the ongoing pandemic. At the 2022 U.S. Championships, Chen won his sixth consecutive U.S. title, a feat only achieved by Dick Button 70 years earlier from 1946 to 1952. Chen scored 115.39, a new national record, in the short program, and 212.62 in the free skate for a combined total score of 328.01.

A month later, at the 2022 Winter Olympics in Beijing, Chen was the U.S. entry in the men's short program in the Olympic team event in which he had poorly performed four years earlier. He skated clean and placed first with a new personal best of 111.71, securing ten points for Team USA. He said, "[I]t feels great to have a short program I actually skated well, at an Olympic experience". The U.S. team initially won the silver medal, which was to be Chen's second Olympic medal; however, following a positive doping test of Russia's gold medalist Kamila Valieva, the team members were not awarded their medals, pending an investigation. In January 2024, the Court of Arbitration for Sport announced the final results, disqualifying Valieva. Six months later, in July 2024, the Court of Arbitration for Sport dismissed appeals by the Russian Olympic Committee, and the U.S. team was awarded the gold medals in a ceremony at the 2024 Summer Olympics in Paris on August 7, 2024. Two days after the team event, Chen set a world record in the men's short program with a score of 113.97, breaking the previous record of 111.82 set by Yuzuru Hanyu in 2020. Chen won an Olympic gold with a free skate score of 218.63 that included five quads, finishing with a combined total score of 332.60. His free-skate costume, which Chen's long-time collaborator New-York-based fashion designer Vera Wang designed, is now part of the permanent collections in the Smithsonian Institution's National Museum of American History. After the Olympics, Chen withdrew from the 2022 World Championships due to injury.

==== 2022–Present: Hiatus ====
Chen stepped away from competition at the end of the 2021–22 season to finish college. Although he has never formally retired from skating, Chen announced on August 8, 2025, that he would not compete at the 2026 Milano Cortina Olympics.

== Show-skating career and coaching ==
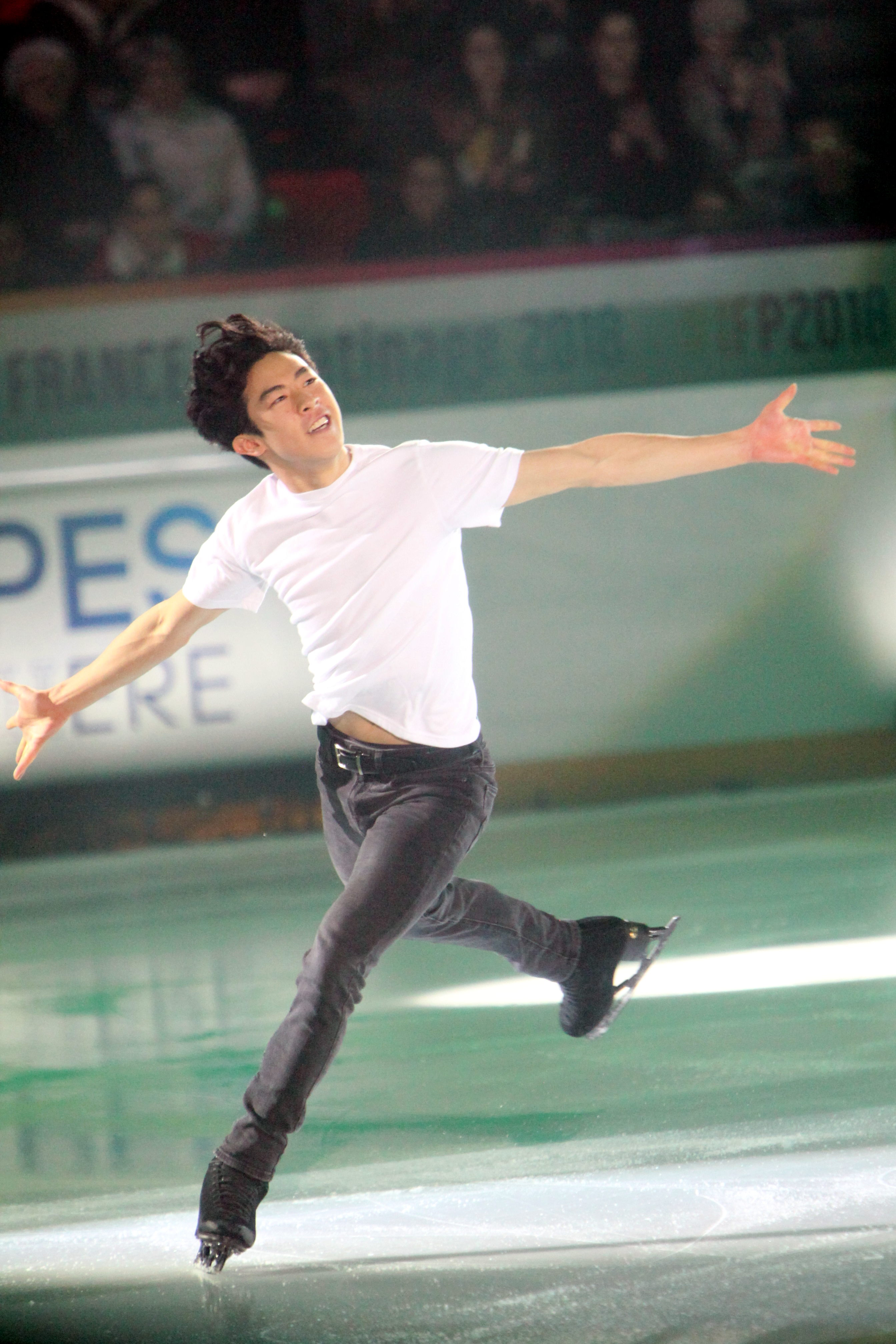
Chen performing in the 2018 Internationaux de France gala

Chen started performing in ice shows from an early age and at five years old, he made appearances in televised shows such as "Holiday On Ice: Las Vegas Style" (2004), and at seven years old in "Supermen On Ice" (2006). After winning his first novice title, he was invited to skate in shows all over the world, including China in 2010, Thailand in 2011, and Malaysia in 2012. He performed in the annual "Sun Valley on Ice" summer shows in Idaho since his early childhood and made several appearances in Harvard University's show "An Evening with Champions".

Since his senior international debut in the 2016–2017 season, Chen has been a regular feature on Stars On Ice Japan, the Stars On Ice U.S. Tour, Dreams On Ice, and THE ICE in Japan. (Note: Chen has been a regular feature in ice shows in the U.S. and Japan. See:) In June 2019, Chen was cast in Yuna Kim's show All That Skate, which took place at the Olympic Park KSPO Dome in Seoul, South Korea, and was directed by Canadian choreographers Sandra Bezic and David Wilson. A few weeks later, Chen was a guest skater with Evgeni Plushenko and Shizuka Arakawa in Prince Ice World in Japan. Chen headlined the annual "Ice Spectacular" at the Vail Skating Festival in Colorado in December 2022, and in 2023, he performed at Skating Club of Boston's Ice Chips, the 20th annual Detroit Tree Lighting event and Scott Hamilton's seventh annual benefit show "Scott Hamilton & Friends" in Nashville before returning to Vail for the "Ice Spectacular" at the end of the year. Chen participated in the tribute show "Legacy on Ice" on March 2, 2025, benefitting victims of the Potomac River mid-air collision and performed in the 2025 edition of "Scott Hamilton & Friends" in November 2025.

Following the cancellation of the 2020 World Championships during the COVID-19 pandemic, Chen coached young skaters at a rink in Connecticut and completed the Continuing Education Requirements (CERS), a mandatory course via the Professional Skaters Association, in which he scored 100% on his module exam. In August 2023, Chen coached at Javier Fernandez's annual summer camp in Spain with Brian Orser, Tracy Wilson, and Florent Amodio. Chen taught at seminars in Seattle and Detroit in June 2024 alongside Jean-Luc Baker and Sam Chouinard via their entrepreneurial enterprise "Your True Step" that Baker and Chen created to help other skaters. The idea that would eventually develop into "Your True Step" was conceived during a training camp leading up to the 2022 Winter Olympics. Your True Step held seminars in Baltimore, Seattle, Boston, Irvine, California in 2025, and Palm Beach, Florida in March 2026. The French Federation of Ice Sports appointed the trio to coach their national junior and novice skaters at a summer camp in Courchevel, France, in June 2026, and they taught at another camp in Fribourg, Switzerland, in July 2026.

== Skating technique and style ==
Chen has been commended for his technical skill and impact on figure skating: 1984 Olympic Champion Scott Hamilton compared him to Dick Button; according to Hamilton, Chen is "not ... satisfied with the status quo and building his athleticism" in an unprecedented way but combining the athleticism with "very significant artistic performances". Olympic Champion Hayes Jenkins commented Chen's "arms, his hands, his carriage" are fluid, unexaggerated, and purposeful and said Chen is "aware of the music". According to Cati Snarr of Ballet West, where Chen trained as a child, Chen "has perfect placement (relative positioning of his torso, head and limbs), perfect turnout (hip rotation) and natural kinesthetic awareness that some kids never get"; while 1980 Olympic Champion Robin Cousins said there is a "wonderful, joyous feeling about [Chen's] skating". From a musical perspective, Chen has progressed with senior programs set to a variety of music such as classical pieces Le Corsaire and the Polovtsian Dances, works by Igor Stravinsky, tracks from melancholy contemporary artists like Woodkid and Philip Glass, upbeat pop songs by Elton John, and contemporary Latin music.

According to Alexei Mishin, fundamentals of the technique he teaches are part of the reason for Chen's consistency: the skater should have a very tight pulling-in position, start the rotation during take-off, and rotate very quickly. Chen's rotation position has been used as an example of what can be defined as the perfect air position; according to George S. Rossano, it is characterized by a vertical axis running through the long axis of his body without hunched shoulders or rounded back and no bend at the waist or the knees, and his arms are pulled tight across his torso like a seat belt. When Chen learned this technique from his childhood coach and former Mishin student Karel Kovar, he trained in "Mishin's Magic Vest", which has sensors that emit beeping sounds when the skater achieves the correct arm position.

== Public life ==
=== Sponsorships, endorsements and partnerships ===
According to Forbes, Chen had long-term contracts with 11 partners: Bridgestone, Panasonic, Comcast, Nike, Toyota, Visa, OMEGA, Coca-Cola, United Airlines and Kellogg's; he has also worked with Powerade and consumer brands Grubhub, Airweave, and Invisalign. Chen was featured on cornflakes boxes from Kellogg's, in Nike and Coca-Cola ads on billboards in New York City, and inspired a United Airlines Olympic athlete super hero action figure. He starred in crossover television commercials for the 2022 film Jurassic World: Dominion with fellow Olympians Shaun White and Mikaela Shiffrin, and promotional pieces and content for other sponsors. Chen is a brand ambassador for Panasonic and fronted their "Green Impact" initiative with tennis player Naomi Osaka and Olympic swimmer Michael Phelps. The company engaged Chen, Osaka, and Phelps for its sustainability mission, and Chen made appearances for Panasonic at the annual technology conference CES 2023 in Las Vegas. In November 2023, Chen, an OMEGA ambassador, attended the opening of the Planet OMEGA exhibition in New York and participated in a panel discussion with Allyson Felix, Noah Lyles and Oksana Masters. Chen contributed to a sleep study for Airweave that was overseen by Emmanuel Mignot, a sleep scientist and professor at Stanford University, and he spoke at the 2023 Nikkei Sleep Conference in Tokyo. The conference focused on sleep as a social issue. During a press briefing at the end of May 2024, Airweave revealed that the company is planning a new research project with Chen. In November 2025, Chen was announced as one of Airbnb's Olympic athlete partners for the 2026 Winter Olympics in Milano-Cortina.

In 2019, Chen partnered with Boosted Boards, a manufacturer of electric skateboards and scooters. He was part of luxury jewelry designer David Yurman's social-media campaign "My New York" in 2021, and collaborated with Yurman to create an exclusive bracelet benefiting AAPI non-profit collective Gold House. In January 2023, Chen was announced as one of the celebrity guests on the fifth season of the Apple podcast Time to Walk on the company's exercise tracking app Apple Fitness Plus; the podcast mixes music and inspirational monologues from musicians, athletes, and actors. On social media, Chen promoted Uniqlo's Heattech collection, products from Ultraslide, and ramen from Japanese food and beverage company Maruchan. Chen has been represented by Yuki Saegusa at IMG since the beginning of his senior career.

=== Ambassadorships ===
In June 2021, the Salt Lake City–Utah Games Committee, bidding to host the Olympic Winter Games in Salt Lake City in 2030 or 2034, named Chen to its Athlete Advisory Committee alongside alpine skiers Lindsey Vonn and Ted Ligety, speed skater Apolo Ohno, and others. Chen said; "the developed infrastructure is already in place, so it makes a lot of sense to bring it back to Salt Lake City ... having an Olympics in a home town of a lot of young athletes can be very inspiring". Salt Lake City previously hosted the Winter Olympics in 2002 and its bid relied on existing infrastructructure and private funding. In July 2024, Salt Lake City was officially elected as host of the 2034 Winter Olympics and Paralympics, and in February 2025, Chen was selected to serve on the steering committee for the 2034 Winter Olympics and Paralympics. He attended the 2026 Winter Olympics in Milan as an ambassador for the 2034 Olympics where his primary responsibilities included networking with 2034 Utah donors and sponsors. Chen was tapped for the Utah 2034 Winter Games Education Committee in August 2026. The goal of the committee is to "provide strategic guidance, foster partnerships, and develop statewide initiatives that connect students and educators to the opportunities created along the road to 2034."

Chen was announced as Goodwill Ambassador for the Lake Placid 2023 FISU World University Games, commonly known as Lake Placid 2023 and spearheaded Panasonic's "Green Impact" campaign at the International University Sports Federation's World Conference that was held in conjunction with the games. The theme of the conference was climate change.

=== Books and magazines ===
Chen's memoir One Jump at a Time: My Story was released in English by HarperCollins in November 2022, in Japanese by Kadokawa in late March 2023, and in Russian by AST in October 2024. In it, Chen discusses his figure-skating career from his childhood as the youngest son of Chinese-American immigrants to his success, his family's determination to fund expensive training, his hip injury and subsequent surgery in 2016, and his disappointment at the 2018 Winter Olympics. In February 2023, HarperCollins released Chen's first children's book Wei Skates On, which is a picture book about feeling nervous and reframing negative thinking, with illustrations by Lorraine Nam. The book tells the story of a young boy named Wei who learns to face his fears and find joy in sports and was named one of the Best Children's Books of the Year by the Bank Street College of Education Children's Book Committee. Wei Skates On was released in Japanese in August 2023 by Shinshokan.

Chen, who skated to music by Philip Glass when he won his third-consecutive world title, was an essay writer in the boxed set Philip Glass Piano Etudes: The Complete Folios 1–20 & Essays from Fellow Artists which was released by Artisan Books on November 7, 2023. The boxed set contains The Complete Folios 1–20 and Studies in Time: Essays on the Music of Philip Glass, and was designed to be an heirloom. In August 2023, Penguin Books released the children's book Who Is Nathan Chen? as part of its bestselling book series Who Was?, which tells the stories of prominent public figures and celebrities.

Chen has also appeared in fashion and news magazines such as Vogue, GQ, Harper's Bazaar, Time, Teen Vogue, Elle, Cosmopolitan, Glamour, and Spur Magazine, and has been featured on the covers of World Figure Skating Magazine and International Figure Skating Magazine. (Note: Chen has appeared in multiple well-known fashion and news magazines. See:)

=== Film and television ===
Chen, who in 2019 chose Elton John's songs from the Oscar-winning motion picture Rocketman for his free skate, later collaborated with the musical artist. In 2021, Chen appeared with singer-songwriter Hayley Kiyoko in three episodes of the Olympic Channel show From the Top: Olympians and Rockstars, which paired Olympic athletes with music stars and for which John served as executive producer. In 2022, Chen starred in the music video for John and Britney Spears' acoustic version of John's song "Hold Me Closer"; in the video, Chen is shown skating at Yale University's Ingalls Rink. In March 2023, Chen attended the Elton John AIDS Foundation's 31st annual Academy Awards party in West Hollywood, California.

In July 2022, Chen appeared as a creator on the NBC television series Dancing With Myself, a dance-competition show in which a creator demonstrates dance moves for each contestant to perform. In August 2022, he appeared in an episode of the CBS series Secret Celebrity Renovation, in which celebrities give a renovation to a person who helped guide them to success. Chen donated a skater's lounge and dressing room to Salt Lake City Sports Complex, where he learned to skate as a toddler; he dedicated the renovation to childhood coaches Stephanee Grosscup, Karel Kovar, and Evgenia Chernyshyova. Chen reunited with all four of his siblings to compete on the Steve Harvey-hosted game show Celebrity Family Feud against Marvel's Shang-Chi actor Simu Liu's team. The episode aired on ABC in August 2022.

Chen served as a correspondent for Yahoo Sports at the 2026 Winter Olympics in Milan where he provided analysis with fellow Olympic gold medalists speed skater Apolo Ohno and alpine skier Julia Mancuso across Yahoo Sports platforms that included YahooSports.tv and YouTube. He has appeared on American television talk shows such as Today, The Late Late Show with James Corden, The Tonight Show Starring Jimmy Fallon, Watch What Happens Live with Andy Cohen, and Access Hollywood.

=== Philanthropic work and supported causes ===
Chen regularly supports charitable causes. Since 2017, he has been involved with Figure Skating in Harlem, a non-profit organization aiming to help girls of color grow in confidence, leadership skills, and academic achievement. In 2022, he was honored at the organization's 25th gala event. Chen has worked with StandUp for Kids, a national non-profit program that works to end youth homelessness and has a branch in Orange County, California, near Chen's training base. Chen allowed children to skate with him at Great Park Ice in 2021. Chen is an investor in the nonprofit collective Gold House, which promotes the interests and safety of people of Asian and Pacific Islander descent. Chen was part of a delegation when Gold House rang the opening bell at the Nasdaq Stock Exchange on May 2, 2023. He spoke against violence against Asian Americans in 2021, calling it "unacceptable". He said, "I worry about my parents more so than myself. I don't want them to go out in the park to walk and then get beat up or [have] worse things to happen to them."

In early 2022, Chen helped the United States Department of Health and Human Services with their public education initiative "We Can Do This", a campaign to promote COVID-19 vaccines, and he spoke to immunologist and former National Institute of Allergy and Infectious Diseases (NIAID) director Anthony Fauci. Chen had been open about his anxiety before traveling to the 2021 World Championships in Stockholm during the pandemic. In 2023, Chen joined the Elton John AIDS Foundation's social-media awareness campaign called InnerElton, an initiative protesting against LGBTQIA+ stigma and championing equality, health equity, and love. The campaign was launched with Elton John's and David Furnish's Rocket Fund, which aims to raise $125 million to help eliminate HIV/AIDS by 2030. In January 2024, Athletes for Hope announced a new Athlete Leadership Council fronted by Chen, professional basketball player Stephen Curry, and Olympic swimmer Katie Ledecky. The non-profit was created in 2006 by Muhammad Ali, Jackie Joyner-Kersee, Andre Agassi, and other top athletes to help athletes make a difference in their communities.

== Accolades and impact ==
Nathan Chen has received numerous accolades for his achievements, and impact on figure skating and the Asian American community. In 2023, he was nominated for a Laureus World Sports Award for Breakthrough of the Year and was named Most Valuable Skater at the International Skating Union's annual ISU Skating Awards 2023. Chen has received nominations for an ESPY Award, a People's Choice Award, and James E. Sullivan Award; and been recognized on reputable lists such as Time magazine's Time 100 that lists the 100 most-influential people in the world, the Time Next Generation Leaders List, Forbes 30 Under 30 Sports list, and Harper's Bazaar's Icons.

Committee of 100, a non-partisan leadership organization of prominent Chinese Americans, presented Chen with its Trailblazer Award for Commitment to Excellence in 2022. Chen is also a Gold House A100 Honoree and has been inducted into the Gold House A100 Hall of Fame. He attended Gold House's 2024 Gold Gala in Los Angeles in May 2024. On January 26, 2023, U.S. President Joe Biden acknowledged Chen during a speech at the White House, where Chen was a guest at the President and First Lady Jill Biden's Lunar New Year reception.

Chen's gold medal-winning performance at the 2022 Winter Olympics played a central role in boosting his public profile. A report from Morning Consult, showed that the rise in recognition and favorability was significant, not just in absolute numbers but in terms of percentage growth. Chen's 13-point increase in recognition (from 27% to 40%) and 10-point rise in favorability (from 15% to 25%) marked the largest jumps among all U.S. athletes surveyed.

Chen was inducted into the U.S. Figure Skating Hall of Fame alongside his longtime coach Rafael Arutyunyan on January 9, 2026, in St. Louis, Missouri, coinciding with the 2026 U.S. Figure Skating Championships. He was honored by the Ice Theatre of New York at their annual benefit gala that took place on May 4, 2026.

== Personal life and education ==
Nathan Chen attended Hawthorne Elementary School in Salt Lake City; he was accepted into the school district's extended learning program, in which he took classes one level above his grade. He later attended West High School in Salt Lake City and Rim of the World High School in Lake Arrowhead, California, and graduated from high school at California Connections Academy. He was admitted to Yale University in 2018 and was in Jonathan Edwards College. After his sophomore year, Chen took a leave of absence to prepare for the 2022 Winter Olympics but returned in late 2022 to complete his baccalaureate degree in statistics and data science. During his junior year, Chen worked in cardio-oncologist Jennifer M. Kwan's research lab at Yale School of Medicine and received an American Heart Association undergraduate research award to support his genomics and cardiovascular research projects. As a senior, Chen wrote manuscripts and gave talks at science symposiums. He graduated from Yale in May 2024 and won a Statistics and Data Science Outstanding Thesis Award for his senior project, entitled "Utilizing Deep Learning to Predict Somatic Variant Pathogenicity."

Chen enrolled in a one-year post-baccalaureate program at Goucher College in Baltimore in 2025 in preparation for medical school admission. While residing in Baltimore, he worked as a research assistant in Johns Hopkins University’s Malone Center for Engineering in Healthcare. He matriculated at Harvard Medical School in August 2026 and is serving as an Ambassador for Public Outreach for the American Junior Investigators Association (AJIA), an initiative established in 2024 to advocate for physician-scientists in the early stages of their careers.

== Records and achievements ==
Nathan Chen holds the highest winning percentage in modern figure skating at 73%. In the 13 season period from the 2009–2010 season, when he entered the novice level, until the 2021–2022 season, his final competitive season, Chen won the U.S. Championship ten times, twice as a novice, twice as a junior and six consecutive times as a senior, only once failing to defend his same-level title; in two of the three remaining seasons, he earned bronze medals.

Chen has seven world record scores in the +5/-5 Grade of Execution (GOE) system, one in the short program, three in the free skate, and three in the combined total score.

The highest segment scores are recognized as world records by Guinness World Records.

Chronological list of world record scores in the +5/-5 GOE system
Date	Segment	Score	Event	Note
October 20, 2018	Free skate	189.99	2018 Skate America	Chen broke Mikhail Kolyada's record from September 2018.
October 20, 2018	Combined total	280.57	2018 Skate America	Chen broke Shoma Uno's record from September 2018.
March 23, 2019	Free skate	216.02	2019 World Championships	Chen broke Yuzuru Hanyu's record from November 2018.
March 23, 2019	Combined total	323.42	2019 World Championships	Chen broke Hanyu's record from November 2018.
December 7, 2019	Free skate	224.92	2019–20 Grand Prix Final	Chen broke his own record from March 2019.
December 7, 2019	Combined total	335.30	2019–20 Grand Prix Final	Chen broke his own record from March 2019.
February 8, 2022	Short program	113.97	2022 Winter Olympics	Chen broke Hanyu's record from February 2020.

== Programs ==
=== Competition and exhibition programs ===
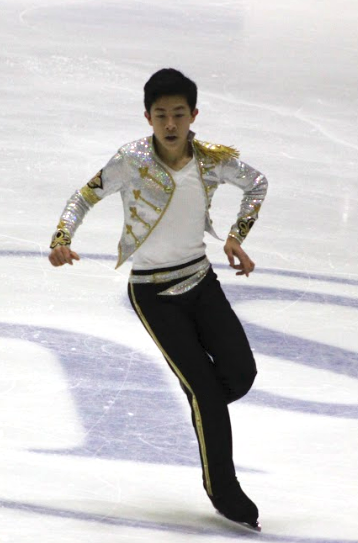
Chen performing his Michael Jackson-medley at the 2015–16 JGP Final

- Program details mentioned at first occurrence
- Olympic seasons highlighted in blue
- Programs performed at the Winter Olympics highlighted in **bold**

Competition and exhibition programs by season
Season	Short program	Free skate program	Exhibition program
2009–10	Kung Fu Panda: Composed by Hans Zimmer; Choreo. by Stephanie Grosscup	Peter and the Wolf: Composed by Sergei Prokofiev; Choreo. by Evgenia Chernyshova	Peter and the Wolf
2010–11	"Rawhide": Composed by Dimitri Tiomkin; Choreo. by Evgenia Chernyshova	Hungarian Rhapsody No. 2: Composed by Franz Liszt; Choreo. by Evgenia Chernyshova	"Rawhide"
2011–12	WALL-E: Composed by Thomas Newman; Choreo. by Stephanie Grosscup	The Godfather: Composed by Nino Rota; Choreo. by Evgenia Chernyshova	"Stereo Hearts": Performed by Gym Class Heroes; Choreo. by Evgenia Chernyshova
2012–13	Praeludium and Allegro: Composed by Fritz Kreisler; Choreo. by Nadia Kanaeva, Rafael Arutyunyan	The Three Musketeers: Composed by Paul Haslinger; Choreo. by Stephanee Grosscup	—N/a
2013–14	The Four Seasons: Composed by Antonio Vivaldi; Choreo. by Nadia Kanaeva	Medley: 1. "Chattanooga Choo Choo"; Composed by Glenn Miller; 2. "Summertime"; Composed by George Gershwin; Choreo. by Nadia Kanaeva	"Home": Performed by Phillip Phillips; Choreo. by Phillip Mills
2014–15	Michael Jackson Medley: Performed by Michael Jackson; Choreo. by Nadia Kanaeva; **Tracks used**: 1. "Smile"; 2. "Smooth Criminal"	Piano Concerto No. 1 in E minor: Composed by Frédéric Chopin; Choreo. by Nadia Kanaeva	"Best Day of My Life": Performed by American Authors; Choreo. by Adam Rippon
2015–16	Michael Jackson Medley	Organ Symphony: Composed by Camille Saint-Saëns; Choreo. by Nikolai Morozov	"Dream On": Performed by Aerosmith
2016–17	Le Corsaire: Composed by Adolphe Adam; Choreo. by Marina Zueva	Polovtsian Dances: From Prince Igor; Composed by Alexander Borodin; Choreo. by Nadia Kanaeva	"Parachute": Performed by Otto Knows; Choreo. by Benoît Richaud
2016–17	Le Corsaire: Composed by Adolphe Adam; Choreo. by Marina Zueva	Polovtsian Dances: From Prince Igor; Composed by Alexander Borodin; Choreo. by Nadia Kanaeva	"Stole the Show": Performed by Kygo ft. Parson James
2017–18	"**Nemesis**": Composed by Benjamin Clementine; Choreo. by Shae-Lynn Bourne	**Mao's Last Dancer**: 1. Mao's Last Dancer; Composed by Christopher Gordon; 2. The Rite of Spring; Composed by Igor Stravinsky; Choreo. by Lori Nichol	"Parachute"
2017–18	"**Nemesis**": Composed by Benjamin Clementine; Choreo. by Shae-Lynn Bourne	**Mao's Last Dancer**: 1. Mao's Last Dancer; Composed by Christopher Gordon; 2. The Rite of Spring; Composed by Igor Stravinsky; Choreo. by Lori Nichol	"Nemesis"
2017–18	"**Nemesis**": Composed by Benjamin Clementine; Choreo. by Shae-Lynn Bourne	**Mao's Last Dancer**: 1. Mao's Last Dancer; Composed by Christopher Gordon; 2. The Rite of Spring; Composed by Igor Stravinsky; Choreo. by Lori Nichol	"Back from the Edge": Performed by James Arthur
2017–18	"**Nemesis**": Composed by Benjamin Clementine; Choreo. by Shae-Lynn Bourne	**Mao's Last Dancer**: 1. Mao's Last Dancer; Composed by Christopher Gordon; 2. The Rite of Spring; Composed by Igor Stravinsky; Choreo. by Lori Nichol	"No Good": Performed by Kaleo; Choreo. by Shae-Lynn Bourne
2018–19	"Caravan": 1. Moliendo Café; 2. "Caravan"; Performed by Fanfare Ciocărlia; Choreo. by Shae-Lynn Bourne	"Land of All": Composed by Woodkid; Choreo. by Marie-France Dubreuil, Samuel Chouinard	"Next to Me": Performed by Otto Knows
2018–19	"Caravan": 1. Moliendo Café; 2. "Caravan"; Performed by Fanfare Ciocărlia; Choreo. by Shae-Lynn Bourne	"Land of All": Composed by Woodkid; Choreo. by Marie-France Dubreuil, Samuel Chouinard	"Nemesis"
2018–19	"Caravan": 1. Moliendo Café; 2. "Caravan"; Performed by Fanfare Ciocărlia; Choreo. by Shae-Lynn Bourne	"Land of All": Composed by Woodkid; Choreo. by Marie-France Dubreuil, Samuel Chouinard	"No Good"
2019–20	"La Bohème": Performed by Charles Aznavour; Choreo. by Shae-Lynn Bourne	Rocket Man: Composed by Elton John, Bernie Taupin; Choreo. by Marie-France Dubreuil, Samuel Chouinard; **Tracks used**: 1. "Goodbye Yellow Brick Road"; 2. "Rocket Man"; 3. "Bennie and the Jets"	"Next to Me"
2020–21	Desperado: 1. "Asturias (Suite Española)"; Composed by Frida Lopez; 2. "Canción del Mariachi"; Performed by Antonio Banderas, Los Lobos; Choreo. by Shae-Lynn Bourne	Philip Glass medley: Composed by Philip Glass; Choreo. by Shae-Lynn Bourne; **Tracks used**: 1. "Metamorphosis II"; 2. Violin Concerto No. 1; 3. Truman Sleeps	Rocket Man
2021–22	"Eternity": 1. "Eternity"; 2. "Nemesis"; Performed by Benjamin Clementine; Choreo. by Shae-Lynn Bourne	Mozart Medley: Composed by Wolfgang Amadeus Mozart; Choreo. by Shae-Lynn Bourne; **Tracks used**: 1. Piano Concerto No. 23; 2. Lacrimosa; 3. "Lacrymosa (Apashe remix")	"The Nights": Performed by Avicii
2021–22	"**La Bohème**"	**Rocket Man**: Choreo. by Massimo Scali (Add'l. choreography)	"**Caravan**"
2021–22	"**La Bohème**"	**Rocket Man**: Choreo. by Massimo Scali (Add'l. choreography)	"Space Song": Performed by Beach House; Choreo. by Massimo Scali
2021–22	"**La Bohème**"	**Rocket Man**: Choreo. by Massimo Scali (Add'l. choreography)	Rocket Man

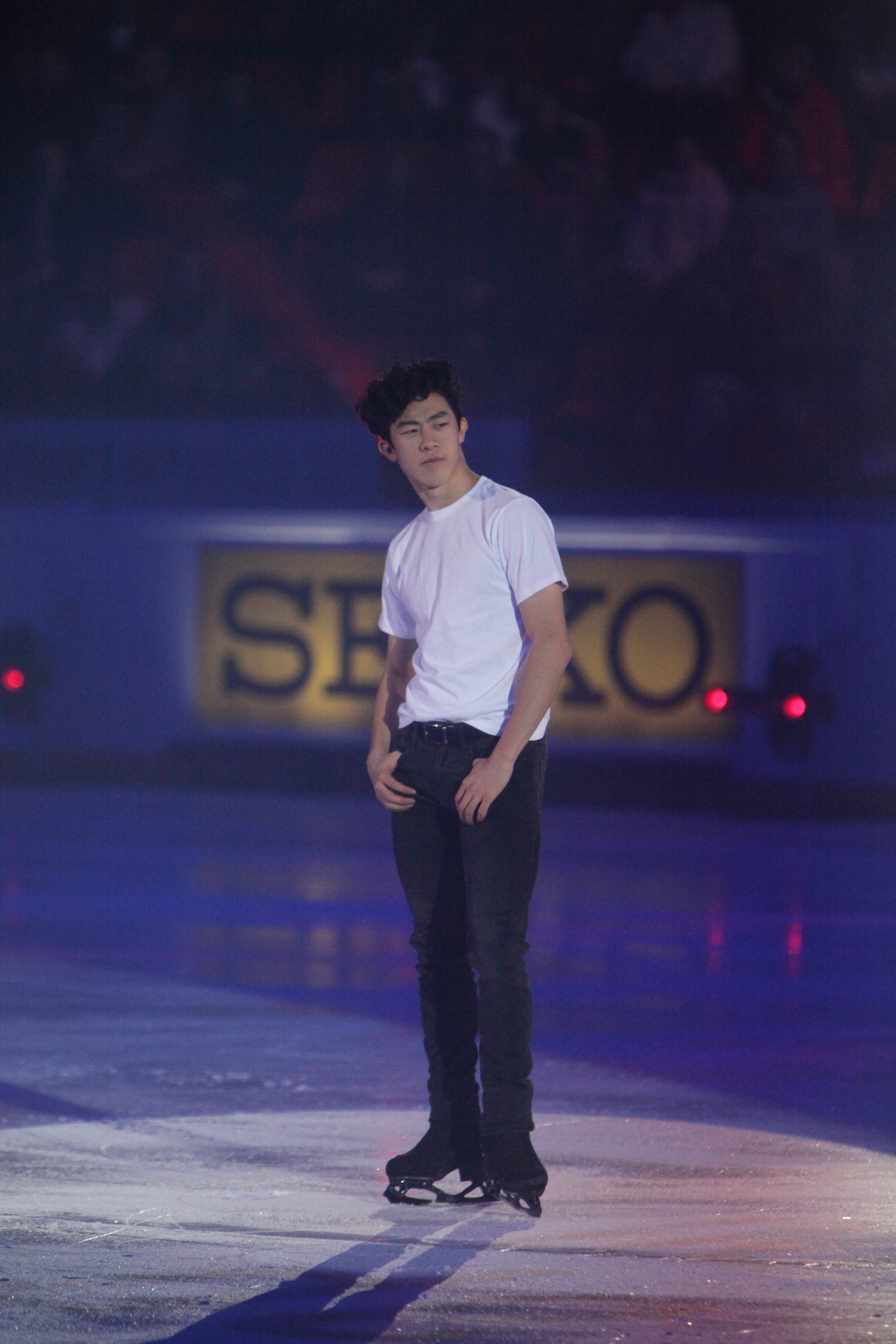
Chen at the 2018 Internationaux de France gala

=== Programs after the 2022 Winter Olympics ===
- Programs performed at three or more ice shows within the same year are only listed with selected shows.
- Show openings and finales are not included in the list.

Show programs after the 2022 Winter Olympics
Year	Program	Event
2022	Rocket Man	Dreams On Ice
2022	"Heat Waves"	THE ICE
2022	Mozart Medley	THE ICE
2022	"Gabriel's Oboe"	THE ICE
2022	Rocket Man"	Vail Skating Festival Ice Spectacular
2022	"Let It Be"	Vail Skating Festival Ice Spectacular
2023	"Vienna"	Ice Chips
2023	"Mr. Blue Sky"	Ice Chips
2023	"Hold Me Closer"	Stars On Ice
2023	"Mr. Blue Sky"	Stars On Ice
2023	"On the Nature of Daylight"	THE ICE
2023	"Hold On Tight"	THE ICE
2023	"Mr. Blue Sky"	THE ICE
2023	"Vienna"	20th Annual Detroit Tree Lighting
2023	"It's the Most Wonderful Time of the Year"	20th Annual Detroit Tree Lighting
2023	"Ladies Love Country Boys"	Scott Hamilton & Friends

== Competitive highlights ==
- GP – Event of the ISU Grand Prix Series
- JGP – Event of the ISU Junior Grand Prix Series
- CS – Event of the ISU Challenger Series
- C – Event was cancelled
- WD – Withdrew from competition
- Medals at team events are awarded for the team results only. Individual placements at team event are listed in parentheses.

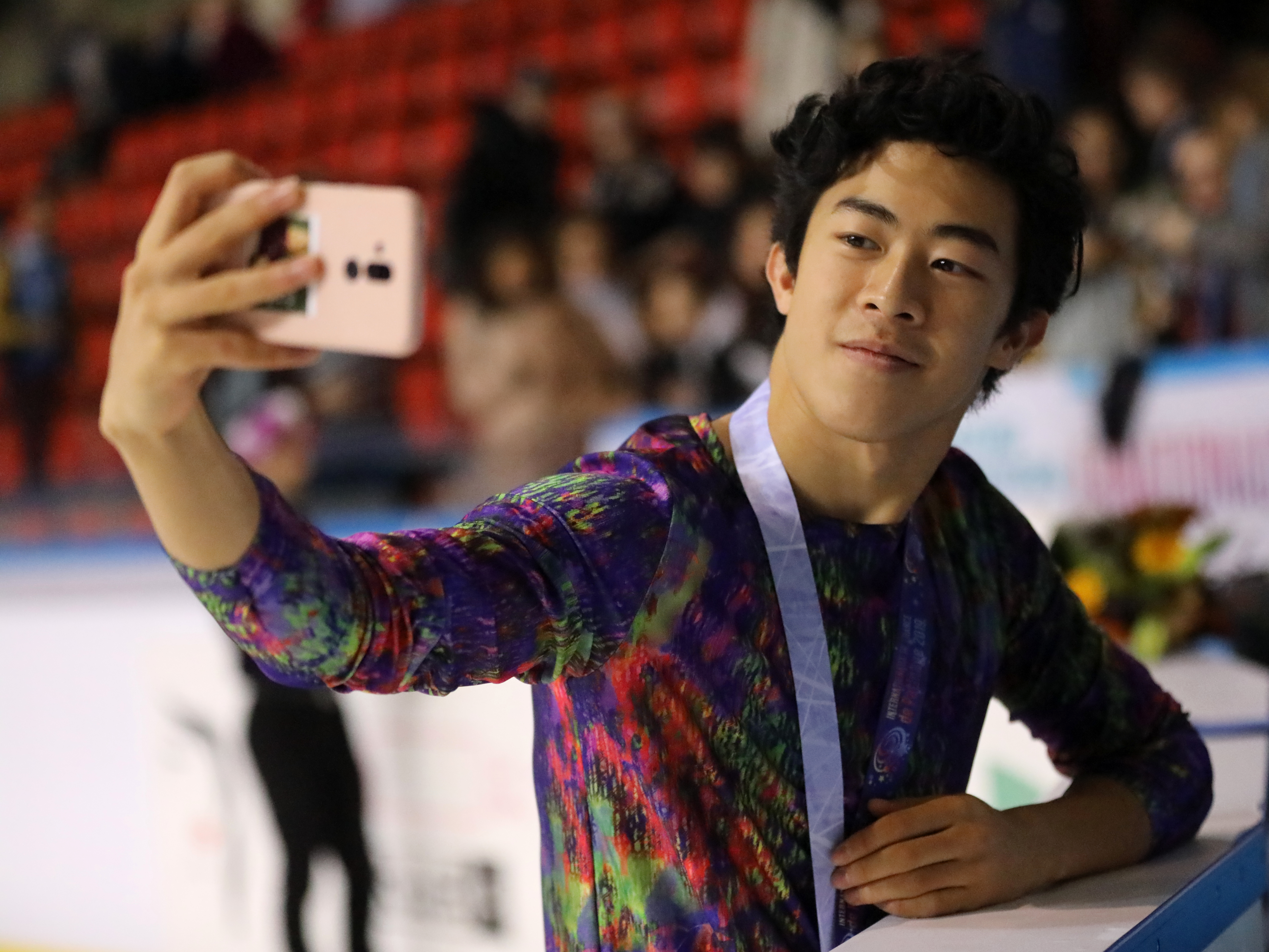
Chen at the 2019 Internationaux de France

Competition placements at senior level
Season	2014–15	2015–16	2016–17	2017–18	2018–19	2019–20	2020–21	2021–22
Winter Olympics				5th				1st
Winter Olympics (Team event)				3rd				1st
World Championships			6th	1st	1st	C	1st	
Four Continents Championships			1st					
Grand Prix Final			2nd	1st	1st	1st	C	C
U.S. Championships	8th	3rd	1st	1st	1st	1st	1st	1st
GP France			4th		1st	1st		
GP NHK Trophy			2nd					
GP Rostelecom Cup				1st				
GP Skate America				1st	1st	1st	1st	3rd
GP Skate Canada								1st
CS Finlandia Trophy			1st					
CS U.S. Classic				1st				
Japan Open				3rd (2nd)	3rd (4th)	3rd (1st)		
World Team Trophy			3rd (2nd)		1st (1st)		2nd (1st)	

Competition placements at junior level
Season	2011–12	2012–13	2013–14	2014–15	2015–16
World Junior Championships			3rd	4th	
Junior Grand Prix Final			3rd		1st
U.S. Championships	1st	3rd	1st		
JGP Austria		1st			
JGP Belarus			1st		
JGP Croatia		WD		2nd	
JGP Mexico			1st		
JGP Spain					1st
JGP United States					1st

== Bibliography ==
=== Books and compilations ===
- Chen, Nathan (November 22, 2022). One Jump at a Time: My Story. New York: HarperCollins. ISBN 978-0-06-328052-6. 240 p.
- With Nam, Lorraine (February 21, 2023). Wei Skates On. New York: HarperCollins. ISBN 978-0-06-328282-7. 40 p.
- ————— (March 29, 2023). 自伝 ワンジャンプ [One Jump at a Time: My Story] (in Japanese). Translated by Naito, Fumiko; Kodama, Atsuko; Nakamura, Kuriko. Chiyoda, Tokyo: Kadokawa. ISBN 978-4-04-113436-8. 368 p.
- With Nam, Lorraine (August 1, 2023). ウェイと金のスケートぐつ [Wei Skates On] (in Japanese). Translated by Noriko, Suga. Bunkyō, Tokyo: Shinshokan. ISBN 978-4-403-31155-0. 32 p.
- ————— (November 7, 2023). "Freedom on the Ice". In Glass, Philip; Brumbach, Linda; Regas, Alisa E. (eds.). Philip Glass Piano Etudes: The Complete Folios 1–20 & Essays from 20 Fellow Artists. New York: Artisan. pp. 96–101. ISBN 978-1-64829-188-3. 136 p.
- ————— (October 2, 2024). К мечте прыжок за прыжком [One Jump at a Time: My Story] (in Russian). Moscow, Russia: AST. ISBN 978-5-17-159790-0. 288 p.

=== Audio ===
- Chen, Nathan (November 22, 2022). One Jump at a Time: My Story [Narrated by Nathan Chen and Eunice Wong]. Audible (Audio book). New York: HarperAudio. Archived from the original on November 7, 2023.
- ————— (February 20, 2023). "Time to Walk with Nathan Chen". Apple (Podcast). No. 80. Cupertino, California: Apple Fitness+. Archived from the original on November 7, 2023.

=== Abstracts and conferences ===
- Chen, Nathan; Shen, Miles; Rao, Veena; Ivey Miranda, Juan; Tan, Zhen; Wei, Wei; Testani, Jeffrey M; Halene, Stephanie; Gu, Jianlei; Zhao, Hongyu; Hwa, John; Jha, Alokkumar; Kwan, Jennifer M (November 7, 2023). "Abstract 17773: Novel Partition Scores Identify Pathways Implicated in Clonal Hematopoiesis of Indeterminate Potential (CHIP) Mediated Heart Failure". Circulation. 148 (Suppl_1). doi:10.1161/circ.148.suppl_1.17773.
- Matute Martinez, Carlos F; Jayakrishnan, Ritujith; Ferrigno Guajardo, Ana; Leveille, Etienne; Lin, Derrick; Im, Yunju; Christofides, Anthos; Chen, Nathan; Baldassarre, Lauren A; VanOudenhove, Jennifer; Halene, Stephanie; Hwa, John; Kwan, Jennifer M (November 7, 2023). "Abstract 17607: Clonal Hematopoiesis of Indeterminate Potential (CHIP) is an Independent Risk Factor for Cardiomyopathy in Patients With Solid Malignancy". Circulation. 148 (Suppl_1). doi:10.1161/circ.148.suppl_1.17607.
- Ryu, Allen; Christofides, Anthos; Matute Martinez, Carlos; Jayakrishnan, Ritujith; Ahn, Shawn; Ferrigno Guajardo, Ana; Espinoza, Jeacy; Chen, Nathan; Jha, Alokkumar; Im, Yunju; Halene, Stephanie; VanOudenhove, Jennifer; Mojibian, Hamid; Duncan, James; Dvornek, Nicha; Kwan, Jennifer M (November 7, 2023). "Abstract 17610: A Novel Approach Using Deep Neural Networks on Clinical Cardiac MRIs Can Identify Patients With Clonal Hematopoiesis of Indeterminate Potential With High Accuracy". Circulation. 148 (Suppl_1). doi:10.1161/circ.148.suppl_1.17610.
- Chehayeb, Rachel Jaber; Hong, Dat; Chen, Nathan W.; Martinez, Carlos Matute; Jayakrishnan, Ritujith; Guajardo, Ana Ferrigno; Lin, Derrick; Im, Yunju; Halene, Stephanie; VanOudenhove, Jennifer; Hwa, John; Jha, Alokkumar; Kwan, Jennifer M. (March 22, 2024). "Abstract 3632: Cytokine profiles associated with ICI myocarditis using machine learning approaches identifies novel cytokines and implicated pathways". Cancer Research. 84 (6_Supplement): 3632. doi:10.1158/1538-7445.AM2024-3632.
- Chen, Nathan; Martinez, Carlos Felipe Matute; Jayakrishnan, Ritujith; Jiang, Matthew; Guajardo, Ana Ferrigno; Vanoudenhove, Jennifer; Im, Yunju; Hwa, John; Halene, Stephanie; Kwan, Jennifer (April 2024). "Clonal Hematopoiesis of Indeterminate Potential (CHIP) is an Independent Risk Factor for Immune Checkpoint Inhibitor Myocarditis". Journal of the American College of Cardiology. 83 (13): 2492. doi:10.1016/S0735-1097(24)04482-6.
- Chen, Nathan (April 13, 2024). "Designing the Optimal Figure Skating Program: Leveraging Data for a Competitive Edge". UConn Sports Analytics Symposium (UCSAS 2024). University of Connecticut, Storrs, CT. Archived from the original on April 6, 2024.
- With Kaur, Harleen; Halder, Saiti; VanOudenhove, Jennifer; Biancon, Giulia; Gu, Sean; Chakraborty, Raja; Jain, Kanika; Park, Jinkyu; Qyang, Yibing; Eiman, Ibrahim; Halene, Stephanie; Hwa, John; Campbell, Stuart; Jha, Allokumar; Kwan, Jennifer (November 11, 2024). "Abstract 4144255: Treatment of Human Engineered Heart Tissue with Serum from Cancer Patients with Clonal Hematopoiesis of Indeterminate Potential Cytokine Leads to Impaired Function". Circulation. 150 (Suppl_1). Lippincott Williams & Wilkins for the American Heart Association: A4144255. doi:10.1161/circ.150.suppl_1.414425 (inactive February 1, 2026). Archived from the original on December 4, 2024.

=== Publications ===
- Obradovic, Aleksandar; Toubat, Omar; Chen, Nathan W.; Siebert, Aisha; Jansen, Carey; Christophers, Briana; Leveille, Etienne; Noch, Evan; Kwan, Jennifer M. (May 28, 2024). "Impact of COVID-19 Pandemic on Physician-Scientist Trainees to Faculty One Year into the Pandemic". BMC Med Educ. 24 (1) 587. BioMed Central: 587 (2024). doi:10.1186/s12909-024-05541-9. PMC 11134762. PMID 38807106.
- Leveille, Etienne; Jaber Chehayeb, Rachel; Matute-Martinez, Carlos; Chen, Nathan W.; Jayakrishnan, Ritujith; Christofides, Anthos; Lin, Derrick; Im, Yunju; Biancon, Giulia; VanOudenhove, Jennifer; Halene, Stephanie; Kwan, Jennifer M. (August 2024). "Clonal Hematopoiesis Is Associated With Cardiomyopathy During Solid Tumor Therapy". JACC: CardioOncology. 6 (4): 605–607. doi:10.1016/j.jaccao.2024.05.013. PMC 11372300. PMID 39239339.
- With Jaber Chehayeb, Rachel; Singh, Jaiveer; Matute-Martinez, Carlos; Ferrigno Guarjardo, Ana; Lin, Derrick; Jayakrishnan, Ritujith; Christofides, Anthos; Leveille, Etienne; Im, Yunju; Biancon, Giulia; VanOudenhove, Jennifer; Ibrahim, Eiman; Ardasheva, Anastasias; Jha, Allokumar; Hwa, John; Halene, Stephanie; Kwan, Jennifer (November 26, 2024). "Clonal hematopoiesis of indeterminate potential is associated with increased risk of immune checkpoint inhibitor myocarditis in a prospective study of a cardio-oncology cohort". Cardio-Oncology. 10 (1) 84 (2024). BMC. doi:10.1186/s40959-024-00289-z. PMC 11590368. PMID 39587635.

== Filmography ==
=== Television ===
Year	Title	Role	Notes	Ref.
2021	From the Top: Olympians and Rockstars	Himself	3 episodes	
2022	Inspiring America: The 2022 Inspiration List	Himself	Special	
2022	Dancing with Myself	Himself	1 episode	
2022	Secret Celebrity Renovation	Himself	1 episode	
2022	Celebrity Family Feud	Himself	1 episode	
2022	A Toast to 2022	Himself	Special	

=== Music video appearance ===
Year	Title	Artist	Ref.
2022	"Hold Me Closer" (Acoustic)	Elton John, Britney Spears	

== See also ==
- List of career achievements by Nathan Chen
- Nathan Chen programs
- List of highest scores in figure skating
- List of Olympic medalists in figure skating
- World medalists
