= Janice Chen =

US biotech entrepreneur

- Born: 1990 or 1991 (age 34–35)
- Education: Johns Hopkins University (BS); University of California, Berkeley (PhD)
- Occupation: Chief technology officer
- Employer: Mammoth Biosciences
- Relatives: Nathan Chen (brother)

Janice Chen is the co-founder and chief technology officer of Mammoth Biosciences, a Brisbane, California-based company, founded in 2018, that is developing diagnostic tests using CRISPR. She received her B.S. degree from Johns Hopkins University and her Ph.D. in Molecular and Cell Biology. from the University of California, Berkeley, where she worked in the lab of CRISPR pioneer Jennifer Doudna.

== Awards and honors ==
Along with two of her co-founders at Mammoth Biosciences, Chen was named to the 2019 Forbes 30 Under 30 Healthcare list and 2020 Business Insider's 30 Under 40 in Healthcare. She was also selected to the 2020 Endpoints Top 20 Women in Biopharma, and 35 Innovators Under 35 in MIT Technology Review in 2021.

== Personal life ==
Chen grew up in Salt Lake City, Utah, and is one of five siblings. Her youngest brother is Olympic figure skater Nathan Chen. Their parents had immigrated to the United States from China in 1988. Chen competed in chess tournaments, where she was often the youngest and the only female. She discovered her love of science at her father's biotech business in Utah.

In 2017, Chen and fellow Berkeley classmate and researcher Lucas Harrington, along with their doctoral advisor, Nobel laureate and Berkeley professor Jennifer Doudna, founded Mammoth Biosciences, a biotech company in San Francisco's Dogpatch neighborhood. In September 2021, Mammoth—now in a state-of-the-art facility in Brisbane, California—completed its seventh round of funding, raising US$195 million at a valuation of over US$1 billion.
