= Ice Chips (ice show) =

Figure skating club

Coordinates: 42.363618°N 71.136947°W

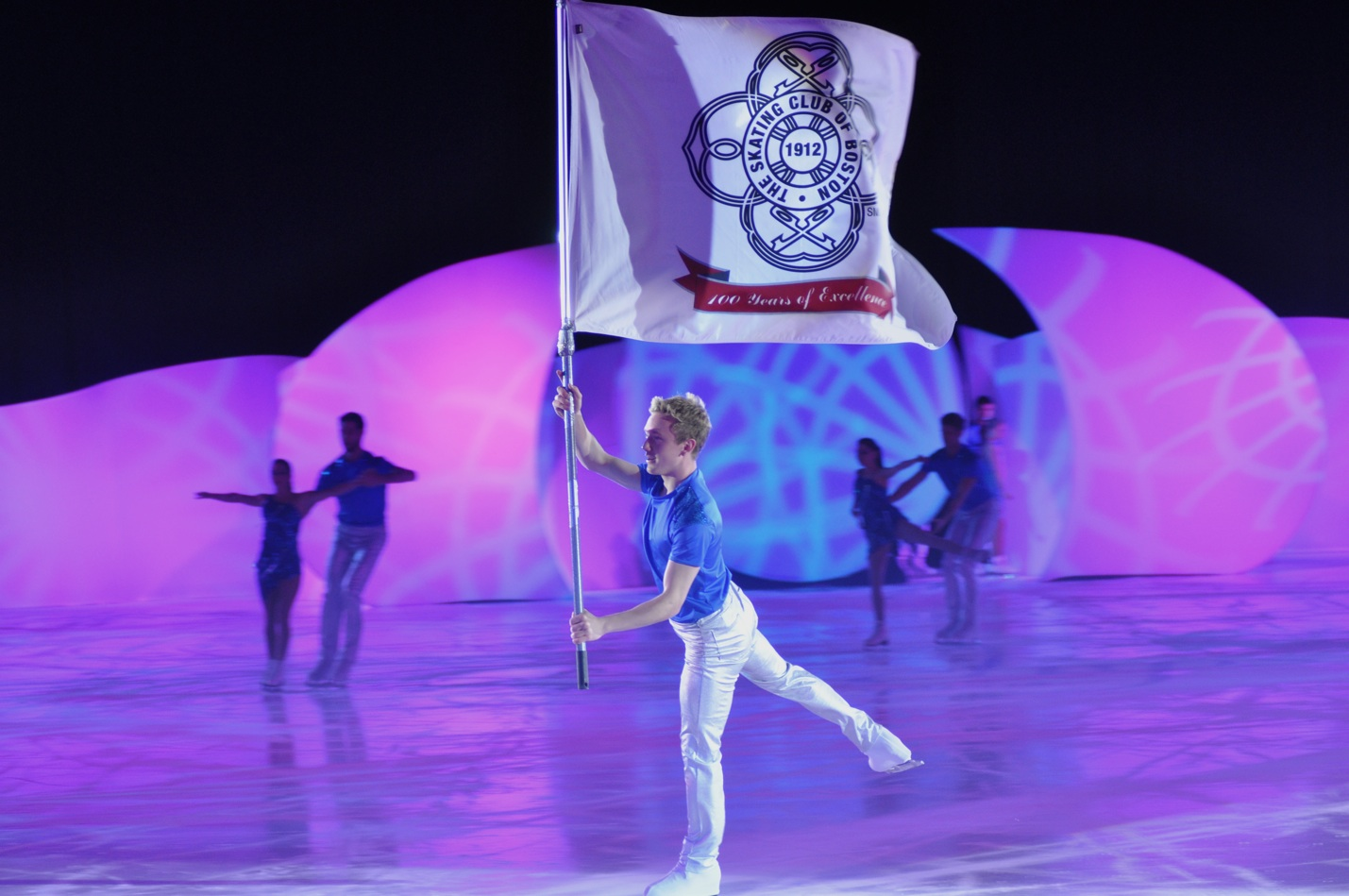
- Ice Chips 2012 - 100th Anniversary Show
- Formation: 1912
- Type: Figure Skating Show
- Location: Boston, Massachusetts United States
- Status: Active
- Parent organization: The Skating Club of Boston
- Website: www.icechips.org
- Formerly called: Ice Carnival

Ice Chips is The Skating Club of Boston's annual ice show held in Boston, Massachusetts. Originating in 1912, Ice Chips is the longest running club-produced show in the world. The show is a two-day event which takes place each spring, showcasing national, international and Olympic champions from around the world. More recently, the show has been held at the Tenley E. Albright Performance Center at the club's facilities in Norwood.

== History ==
Originally referred to as an ice carnival, Ice Chips developed many of the techniques used in professional ice shows today. In the 1920s and 1930s, the ice carnival served as a touring show, showcasing the club's premiere skaters on the East Coast. Revenue from these early shows funded the building of The Skating Club of Boston's current facility on Soldiers Field Road in 1938. Over the years, Ice Chips has showcased some of the greatest skaters in figure skating history. In the early years, Olympic champions Gillis Grafström, Sonja Henie, Karl Schäfer, Andrée Brunet, Pierre Brunet, Maxi Herber and Ernst Baier, and World champions, Cecilia Colledge and Felix Kaspar.

In 1946, the show adopted the name Ice Chips, and went on to feature many more major champions including Dick Button, Barbara Ann Scott, Tenley Albright, Hayes Jenkins, Carol Heiss, Sjoukje Dijkstra, Donald Jackson, Barbara Wagner, Robert Paul, Peggy Fleming, Dorothy Hamill, Charles Tickner, Elaine Zayak, Scott Hamilton, Brian Boitano, Kurt Browning, Yuka Sato, Frances Dafoe, Norris Bowden, Tai Babilonia and Randy Gardner, Alexei Yagudin, Stephane Lambiel, Xue Shen and Hongbo Zhao, Jeffrey Buttle, Javier Fernandez, Kaetlyn Osmond, and Nathan Chen.

Preceding a 7-year run at Harvard University's Bright Arena, Ice Chips had been held in some of Boston's most historic venues, including the original Boston Garden, Northeastern University's Matthews Arena, and Boston University's Walter Brown Arena. While at Harvard University, the show featured Olympic medalists, Xue Shen and Hongbo Zhao, Meryl Davis and Charlie White, Evan Lysacek, and Javier Fernandez. With the opening of the Skating Club of Boston's new facilities in Norwood in the fall of 2020, the show currently, as of 2023, takes place at the Tenley E. Albright Performance Center.

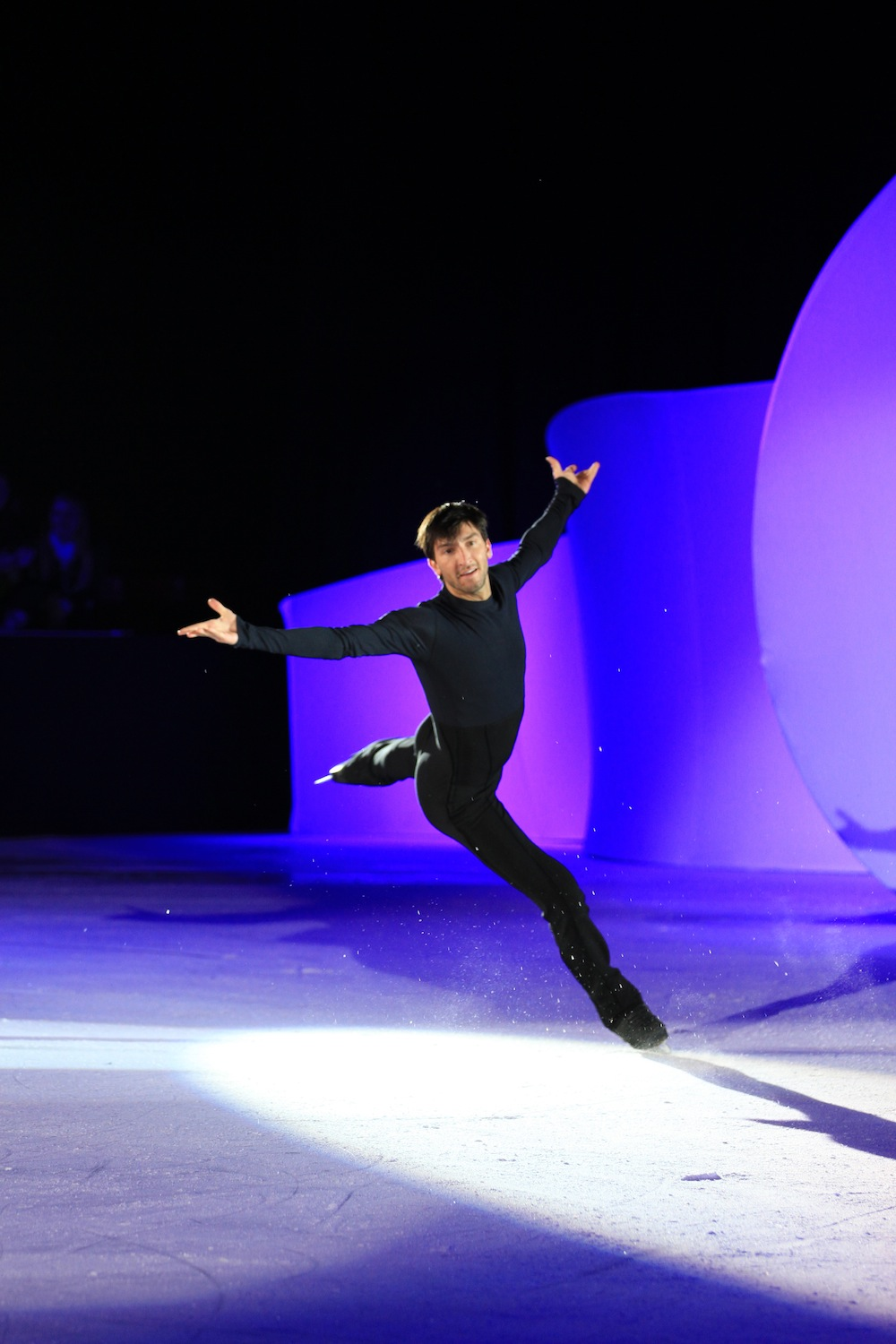
Evan Lysacek - Ice Chips 2012

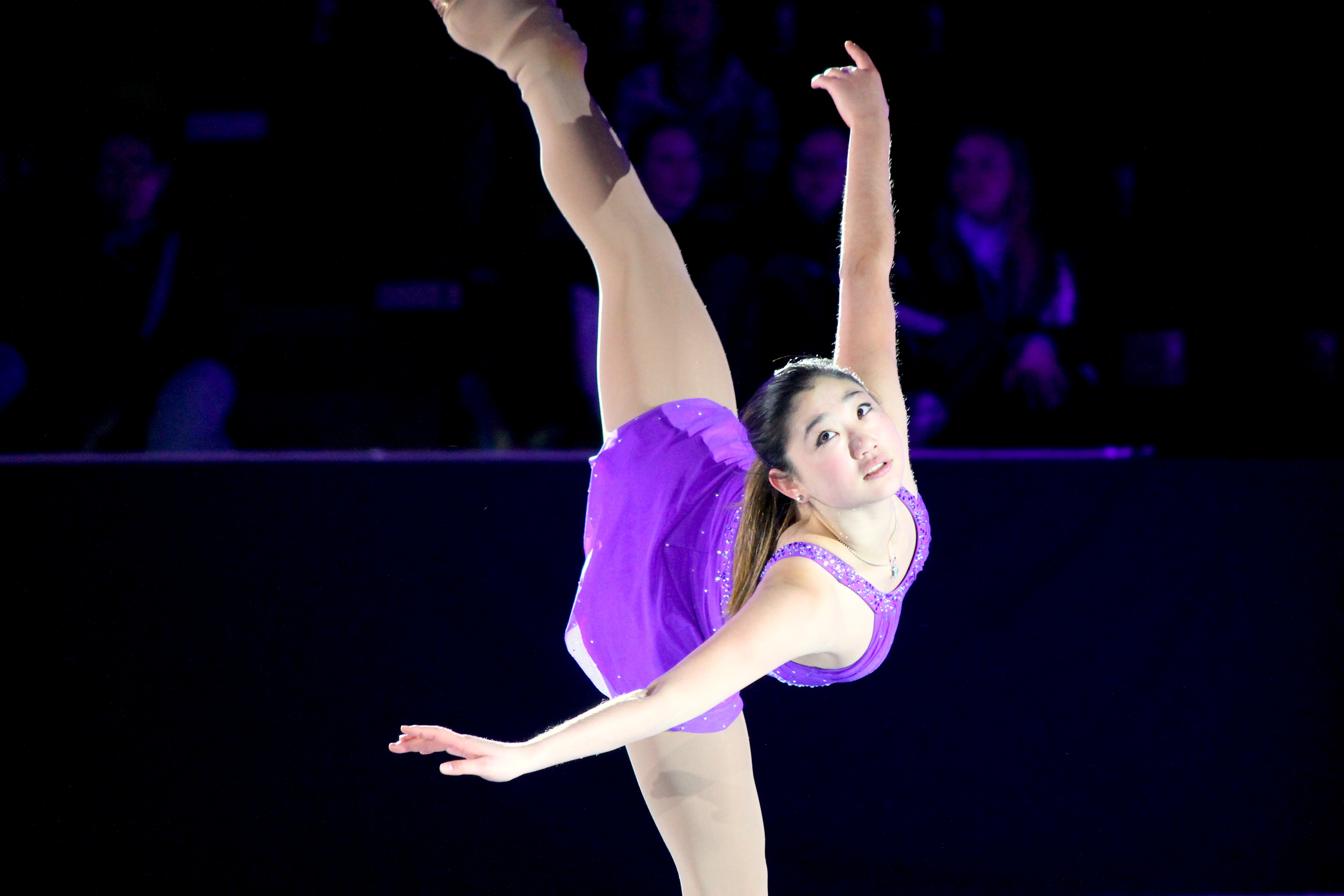
Mirai Nagasu - Ice Chips 2012

=== 100th Anniversary ===
The 2012 production titled "Ice Chips of 2012 - 100 Years of Excellence" marked the 100th anniversary of Ice Chips and showcased over 400 skaters, including singles, pairs, ice dance, synchronized skating and theatre on ice teams. Some of the top performers in the production included Ross Miner, Marissa Castelli and Simon Shnapir, Gretchen Donlan and Andrew Speroff and guest stars Evan Lysacek and Mirai Nagasu.

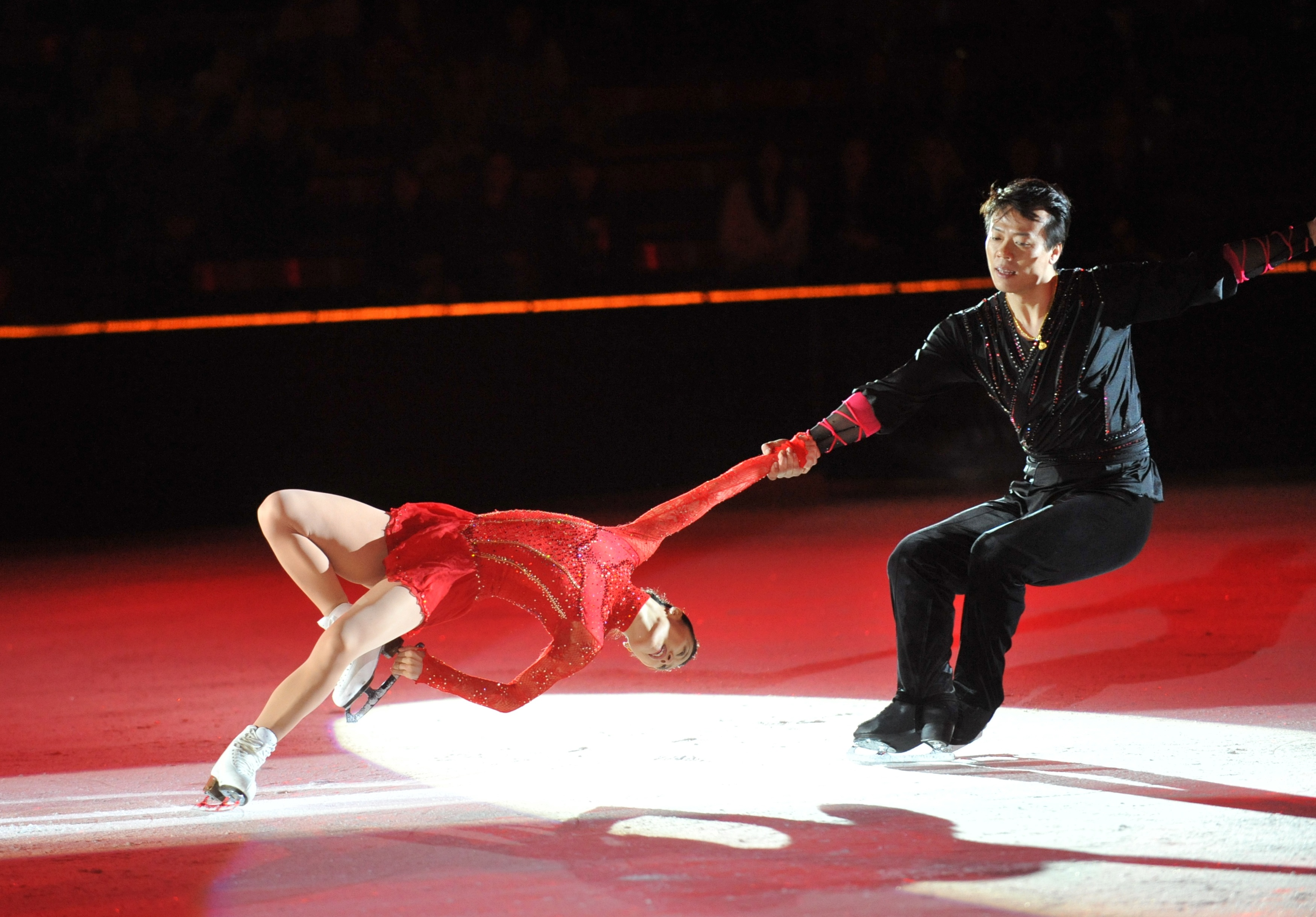
Xue Shen & Hongbo Zhao - Ice Chips 2011

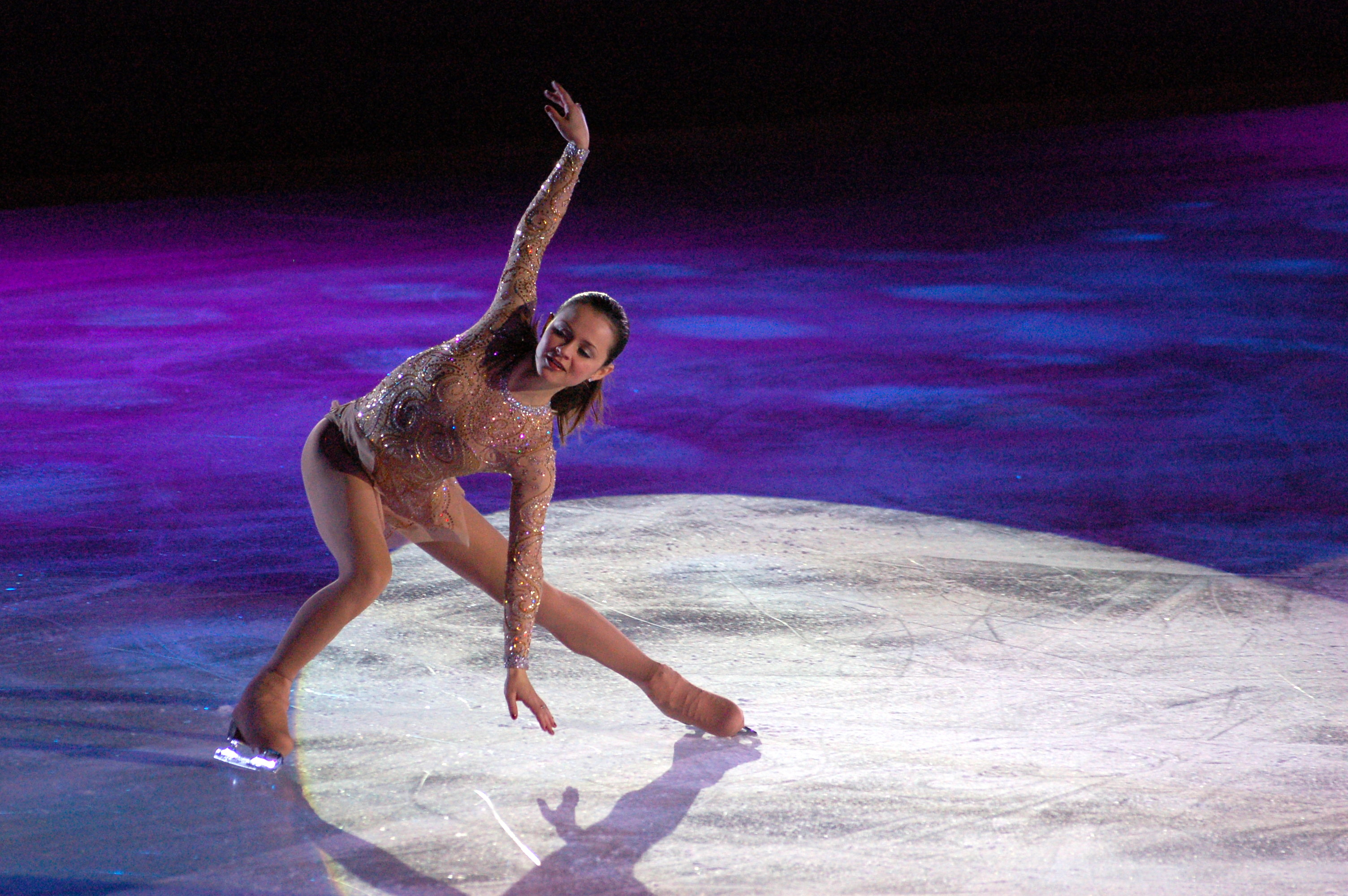
Sasha Cohen - Ice Chips 2007

== Notable Performers ==
A partial list of notable skaters who have performed in Ice Chips include:

- Theresa Weld Blanchard and Nathaniel Niles
- Beatrix Loughran and Sherwin Badger
- Joan Tozzer and Bernard Fox
- Roger F. Turner
- Maribel Vinson
- Gretchen Merrill
- Dick Button
- Tenley Albright
- Laurence Owen
- Maribel Owen and Dudley Richards
- Bradley Lord
- Lorraine Hanlon
- Albertina Noyes
- John Misha Petkevich
- Suna Murray
- Paul Wylie
- Mark Mitchell
- Alexei Yagudin
- Jennifer Kirk
- Sasha Cohen
- Stephen Carriere
- Emily Hughes
- Ryan Bradley
- Ross Miner
- Meryl Davis and Charlie White
- Xue Shen and Hongbo Zhao
- Mirai Nagasu
- Evan Lysacek
- Gracie Gold
- Jason Brown
- Javier Fernandez
- Nathan Chen
- Maxim Naumov
- Jimmy Ma
- Amber Glenn
- Alysa Liu

== Beneficiaries ==
Ice Chips has donated revenues from the shows to various charities over the last 80 years. In recent years, Ice Chips has generated donations close to $100,000 for the Division of Sports Medicine at Children's Hospital Boston, Girl Scouts of Eastern Massachusetts, and Make-a-Wish Foundation.
