= 2017–18 ISU Season's World Ranking =

Merit-based ice skating ranking

2017–18 ISU World Standings and Season's World Ranking
Season-end No. 1 skaters
- Men's singles: (Japan) Yuzuru Hanyu
- Ladies' singles: (Canada) Kaetlyn Osmond
- Pairs: (Germany) Aljona Savchenko / Bruno Massot
- Ice dance: (Canada) Tessa Virtue / Scott Moir

Season's No. 1 skaters
- Men's singles: (United States) Nathan Chen
- Ladies' singles: (Russia) Alina Zagitova
- Pairs: (Germany) Aljona Savchenko / Bruno Massot
- Ice dance: (France) Gabriella Papadakis / Guillaume Cizeron

Season-end No. 1 teams
- Senior Synchronized: (Russia) Team Paradise
- Junior Synchronized: (Russia) Team Junost Junior

Navigation

The 2017–18 ISU World Standings and Season's World Ranking, are the World Standings and Season's World Ranking published by the International Skating Union (ISU) during the 2017–18 season.

The 2017–18 ISU Season's World Ranking is based on the results of the 2017–18 season only, for single & pair skating and ice dance.

== Season's World Ranking ==
The remainder of this section is a complete list, by discipline, published by the ISU.

=== Men's singles (149 skaters) ===
As of 24 March 2018

Rank	Nation	Skater	Points	Season	ISU Championships or Olympics	(Junior) Grand Prix and Final		Selected International Competition	
Rank	Nation	Skater	Points	Season	Best	Best	2nd Best	Best	2nd Best
1	USA	Nathan Chen	2700	2017/2018 season (100%)	1200	800	400	300	0
2	RUS	Mikhail Kolyada	2539	2017/2018 season (100%)	972	648	400	300	219
3	JPN	Shoma Uno	2500	2017/2018 season (100%)	1080	720	400	300	0
4	ISR	Alexei Bychenko	1909	2017/2018 season (100%)	875	324	262	270	178
5	ESP	Javier Fernandez	1908	2017/2018 season (100%)	972	400	236	300	0
6	JPN	Yuzuru Hanyu	1830	2017/2018 season (100%)	1200	360	0	270	0
7	CHN	Boyang Jin	1827	2017/2018 season (100%)	875	360	292	300	0
8	USA	Jason Brown	1782	2017/2018 season (100%)	680	472	360	270	0
9	LAT	Deniss Vasiļjevs	1605	2017/2018 season (100%)	709	236	191	250	219
10	USA	Adam Rippon	1593	2017/2018 season (100%)	465	525	360	243	0
11	USA	Max Aaron	1561	2017/2018 season (100%)	551	324	213	270	203
12	RUS	Sergei Voronov	1553	2017/2018 season (100%)	0	583	400	300	270
13	RUS	Dmitri Aliev	1483	2017/2018 season (100%)	756	236	191	300	0
14	JPN	Kazuki Tomono	1423	2017/2018 season (100%)	787	213	0	225	198
15	UZB	Misha Ge	1352	2017/2018 season (100%)	517	324	292	219	0
16	GEO	Morisi Kvitelashvili	1332	2017/2018 season (100%)	264	262	236	300	270
17	ITA	Matteo Rizzo	1328	2017/2018 season (100%)	405	250	148	300	225
18	RUS	Alexander Samarin	1310	2017/2018 season (100%)	496	324	292	198	0
19	USA	Vincent Zhou	1271	2017/2018 season (100%)	709	292	0	270	0
20	CAN	Keegan Messing	1270	2017/2018 season (100%)	574	262	191	243	0
21	JPN	Keiji Tanaka	1219	2017/2018 season (100%)	612	213	0	250	144
22	BEL	Jorik Hendrickx	1112	2017/2018 season (100%)	325	262	0	300	225
23	CHN	Han Yan	1099	2017/2018 season (100%)	325	262	262	250	0
24	USA	Alexei Krasnozhon	1052	2017/2018 season (100%)	0	350	250	270	182
25	RUS	Alexey Erokhov	1000	2017/2018 season (100%)	500	250	250	0	0
26	RUS	Roman Savosin	954	2017/2018 season (100%)	328	225	182	219	0
27	SWE	Alexander Majorov	946	2017/2018 season (100%)	446	0	0	250	250
28	CZE	Michal Brezina	879	2017/2018 season (100%)	465	236	0	178	0
29	USA	Camden Pulkinen	860	2017/2018 season (100%)	295	315	250	0	0
30	RUS	Makar Ignatov	838	2017/2018 season (100%)	0	255	225	198	160
31	CAN	Patrick Chan	809	2017/2018 season (100%)	517	292	0	0	0
32	ITA	Daniel Grassl	781	2017/2018 season (100%)	0	148	133	250	250
33	CAN	Nam Nguyen	773	2017/2018 season (100%)	362	213	0	198	0
34	CAN	Joseph Phan	772	2017/2018 season (100%)	365	225	182	0	0
35	KAZ	Denis Ten	766	2017/2018 season (100%)	192	191	0	219	164
36	JPN	Mitsuki Sumoto	749	2017/2018 season (100%)	215	284	250	0	0
37	AUS	Brendan Kerry	723	2017/2018 season (100%)	237	0	0	243	243
38	UKR	Ivan Pavlov	711	2017/2018 season (100%)	239	164	148	160	0
39	CAN	Liam Firus	677	2017/2018 season (100%)	0	191	0	243	243
40	USA	Tomoki Hiwatashi	672	2017/2018 season (100%)	266	203	203	0	0
41	FRA	Chafik Besseghier	656	2017/2018 season (100%)	293	0	0	203	160
42	JPN	Takahito Mura	637	2017/2018 season (100%)	264	213	0	160	0
42	CAN	Kevin Reynolds	637	2017/2018 season (100%)	446	191	0	0	0
44	FRA	Romain Ponsart	632	2017/2018 season (100%)	247	0	0	203	182
45	SUI	Stephane Walker	613	2017/2018 season (100%)	140	0	0	270	203
46	USA	Ross Miner	612	2017/2018 season (100%)	0	236	0	198	178
47	USA	Andrew Torgashev	610	2017/2018 season (100%)	0	225	207	178	0
48	GER	Paul Fentz	595	2017/2018 season (100%)	275	0	0	160	160
49	RUS	Artur Danielian	583	2017/2018 season (100%)	450	133	0	0	0
50	ISR	Daniel Samohin	582	2017/2018 season (100%)	339	0	0	243	0
51	TUR	Başar Oktar	555	2017/2018 season (100%)	0	182	148	225	0
52	FIN	Valtter Virtanen	554	2017/2018 season (100%)	126	0	0	225	203
53	MAS	Julian Zhi Jie Yee	549	2017/2018 season (100%)	173	0	0	198	178
54	POL	Igor Reznichenko	522	2017/2018 season (100%)	74	0	0	250	198
55	FRA	Luc Economides	521	2017/2018 season (100%)	114	225	182	0	0
56	USA	Grant Hochstein	512	2017/2018 season (100%)	293	0	0	219	0
57	CAN	Conrad Orzel	477	2017/2018 season (100%)	141	203	133	0	0
58	GBR	Graham Newberry	475	2017/2018 season (100%)	0	0	0	250	225
58	ITA	Maurizio Zandron	475	2017/2018 season (100%)	0	0	0	250	225
60	FRA	Adam Siao Him Fa	473	2017/2018 season (100%)	93	108	108	164	0
61	ITA	Ivan Righini	469	2017/2018 season (100%)	0	0	0	250	219
62	TUR	Burak Demirboga	468	2017/2018 season (100%)	83	0	0	203	182
62	UKR	Yaroslav Paniot	468	2017/2018 season (100%)	0	0	0	243	225
64	EST	Daniel Albert Naurits	466	2017/2018 season (100%)	102	0	0	182	182
65	FRA	Adrien Tesson	453	2017/2018 season (100%)	0	0	0	250	203
66	ESP	Javier Raya	450	2017/2018 season (100%)	0	0	0	225	225
67	GBR	Phillip Harris	440	2017/2018 season (100%)	237	0	0	203	0
68	USA	Alexander Johnson	434	2017/2018 season (100%)	0	0	0	270	164
69	SUI	Lukas Britschgi	428	2017/2018 season (100%)	0	0	0	225	203
69	USA	Timothy Dolensky	428	2017/2018 season (100%)	0	0	0	250	178
71	GER	Peter Liebers	422	2017/2018 season (100%)	0	0	0	219	203
72	KOR	Geon Hyeong An	413	2017/2018 season (100%)	113	97	0	203	0
73	KOR	June Hyoung Lee	412	2017/2018 season (100%)	214	0	0	198	0
74	CAN	Elladj Balde	402	2017/2018 season (100%)	402	0	0	0	0
75	CAN	Nicolas Nadeau	391	2017/2018 season (100%)	0	213	0	178	0
76	JPN	Ryuju Hino	389	2017/2018 season (100%)	0	0	0	225	164
77	ISR	Mark Gorodnitsky	388	2017/2018 season (100%)	127	164	97	0	0
78	KOR	Sihyeong Lee	379	2017/2018 season (100%)	174	108	97	0	0
79	RUS	Igor Efimchuk	367	2017/2018 season (100%)	0	203	164	0	0
80	HUN	Alexander Maszljanko	364	2017/2018 season (100%)	0	0	0	182	182
81	SUI	Nurullah Sahaka	353	2017/2018 season (100%)	103	0	0	250	0
82	GEO	Irakli Maysuradze	339	2017/2018 season (100%)	157	182	0	0	0
83	TPE	Chih-I Tsao	338	2017/2018 season (100%)	156	0	0	182	0
84	ARM	Slavik Hayrapetyan	336	2017/2018 season (100%)	192	0	0	144	0
85	JPN	Tatsuya Tsuboi	328	2017/2018 season (100%)	0	164	164	0	0
86	AUS	Mark Webster	326	2017/2018 season (100%)	0	0	0	182	144
87	RUS	Egor Murashov	323	2017/2018 season (100%)	0	203	120	0	0
88	RUS	Andrei Lazukin	322	2017/2018 season (100%)	0	0	0	178	144
89	RUS	Alexander Petrov	304	2017/2018 season (100%)	0	0	0	160	144
90	JPN	Yuto Kishina	297	2017/2018 season (100%)	0	164	133	0	0
90	JPN	Koshiro Shimada	297	2017/2018 season (100%)	0	164	133	0	0
92	NOR	Sondre Oddvoll Bøe	295	2017/2018 season (100%)	92	0	0	203	0
93	FRA	Maxence Collet	279	2017/2018 season (100%)	0	97	0	182	0
94	KOR	Jun Hwan Cha	275	2017/2018 season (100%)	275	0	0	0	0
95	MEX	Donovan Carrillo	273	2017/2018 season (100%)	140	133	0	0	0
96	CZE	Petr Kotlarik	271	2017/2018 season (100%)	68	0	0	203	0
97	CZE	Jiri Belohradsky	256	2017/2018 season (100%)	0	148	108	0	0
98	FRA	Kevin Aymoz	250	2017/2018 season (100%)	0	0	0	250	0
98	RUS	Konstantin Miliukov	250	2017/2018 season (100%)	0	0	0	250	0
100	KAZ	Abzal Rakimgaliev	247	2017/2018 season (100%)	83	0	0	164	0
101	RUS	Artur Dmitriev	243	2017/2018 season (100%)	0	0	0	243	0
102	CHN	Yan Hao	240	2017/2018 season (100%)	0	120	120	0	0
103	ITA	Alessandro Fadini	225	2017/2018 season (100%)	0	0	0	225	0
103	GBR	Peter James Hallam	225	2017/2018 season (100%)	0	0	0	225	0
103	NED	Thomas Kennes	225	2017/2018 season (100%)	0	0	0	225	0
103	RUS	Vladimir Samoilov	225	2017/2018 season (100%)	0	225	0	0	0
107	HUN	Alexander Borovoj	203	2017/2018 season (100%)	0	0	0	203	0
107	ITA	Jari Kessler	203	2017/2018 season (100%)	0	0	0	203	0
107	JPN	Sena Miyake	203	2017/2018 season (100%)	83	120	0	0	0
107	RUS	Egor Rukhin	203	2017/2018 season (100%)	0	203	0	0	0
107	FRA	Philip Warren	203	2017/2018 season (100%)	0	0	0	203	0
112	GER	Jonathan Hess	194	2017/2018 season (100%)	194	0	0	0	0
113	ITA	Adrien Bannister	182	2017/2018 season (100%)	0	0	0	182	0
113	POL	Krzysztof Gala	182	2017/2018 season (100%)	0	0	0	182	0
113	JPN	Hiroaki Sato	182	2017/2018 season (100%)	0	0	0	182	0
113	JPN	Jun Suzuki	182	2017/2018 season (100%)	0	0	0	182	0
117	SWE	Gabriel Folkesson	175	2017/2018 season (100%)	55	120	0	0	0
118	TUR	Engin Ali Artan	164	2017/2018 season (100%)	0	0	0	164	0
118	ITA	Mattia Dalla Torre	164	2017/2018 season (100%)	0	0	0	164	0
118	POL	Lukasz Kedzierski	164	2017/2018 season (100%)	0	0	0	164	0
118	SVK	Marco Klepoch	164	2017/2018 season (100%)	0	0	0	164	0
118	FRA	Landry Le May	164	2017/2018 season (100%)	0	0	0	164	0
118	AUT	Luc Maierhofer	164	2017/2018 season (100%)	0	0	0	164	0
118	SVK	Michael Neuman	164	2017/2018 season (100%)	0	0	0	164	0
118	SWE	Illya Solomin	164	2017/2018 season (100%)	0	0	0	164	0
118	GER	Thomas Stoll	164	2017/2018 season (100%)	0	0	0	164	0
118	SUI	Nicola Todeschini	164	2017/2018 season (100%)	0	0	0	164	0
118	HKG	Harrison Jon-Yen Wong	164	2017/2018 season (100%)	0	0	0	164	0
118	JPN	Sota Yamamoto	164	2017/2018 season (100%)	0	0	0	164	0
130	CZE	Matyas Belohradsky	148	2017/2018 season (100%)	0	148	0	0	0
130	RUS	Evgeni Semenenko	148	2017/2018 season (100%)	0	148	0	0	0
132	PHI	Michael Christian Martinez	144	2017/2018 season (100%)	0	0	0	144	0
132	JPN	Daisuke Murakami	144	2017/2018 season (100%)	0	0	0	144	0
132	USA	Sean Rabbitt	144	2017/2018 season (100%)	0	0	0	144	0
135	CHN	Shuai Fang	133	2017/2018 season (100%)	0	133	0	0	0
136	CHN	He Zhang	126	2017/2018 season (100%)	126	0	0	0	0
137	USA	Maxim Naumov	120	2017/2018 season (100%)	0	120	0	0	0
137	USA	Eric Sjoberg	120	2017/2018 season (100%)	0	120	0	0	0
139	ESP	Felipe Montoya	113	2017/2018 season (100%)	113	0	0	0	0
140	MAS	Kai Xiang Chew	108	2017/2018 season (100%)	0	108	0	0	0
140	USA	Ryan Dunk	108	2017/2018 season (100%)	0	108	0	0	0
140	AUS	James Min	108	2017/2018 season (100%)	0	108	0	0	0
143	AUS	Andrew Dodds	102	2017/2018 season (100%)	102	0	0	0	0
144	ITA	Nik Folini	97	2017/2018 season (100%)	0	97	0	0	0
144	AZE	Larry Loupolover	97	2017/2018 season (100%)	0	97	0	0	0
144	JPN	Taichiro Yamakuma	97	2017/2018 season (100%)	0	97	0	0	0
147	KOR	Younghyun Cha	75	2017/2018 season (100%)	75	0	0	0	0
148	HKG	Leslie Man Cheuk Ip	74	2017/2018 season (100%)	74	0	0	0	0
149	THA	Micah Kai Lynette	49	2017/2018 season (100%)	49	0	0	0	0

=== Ladies' singles (157 skaters) ===
As of 23 March 2018

Rank	Nation	Skater	Points	Season	ISU Championships or Olympics	(Junior) Grand Prix and Final		Selected International Competition	
Rank	Nation	Skater	Points	Season	Best	Best	2nd Best	Best	2nd Best
1	RUS	Alina Zagitova	2700	2017/2018 season (100%)	1200	800	400	300	0
2	CAN	Kaetlyn Osmond	2548	2017/2018 season (100%)	1200	648	400	300	0
3	JPN	Wakaba Higuchi	2432	2017/2018 season (100%)	1080	472	360	270	250
4	ITA	Carolina Kostner	2331	2017/2018 season (100%)	875	583	360	270	243
5	RUS	Evgenia Medvedeva	2180	2017/2018 season (100%)	1080	400	400	300	0
6	RUS	Maria Sotskova	1992	2017/2018 season (100%)	612	720	360	300	0
7	JPN	Kaori Sakamoto	1937	2017/2018 season (100%)	840	360	262	250	225
8	JPN	Satoko Miyahara	1897	2017/2018 season (100%)	972	525	400	0	0
9	JPN	Mai Mihara	1860	2017/2018 season (100%)	756	292	292	270	250
10	USA	Bradie Tennell	1502	2017/2018 season (100%)	709	324	0	250	219
11	KAZ	Elizabet Tursynbaeva	1414	2017/2018 season (100%)	418	262	191	300	243
12	CAN	Gabrielle Daleman	1288	2017/2018 season (100%)	638	236	236	178	0
13	RUS	Stanislava Konstantinova	1168	2017/2018 season (100%)	365	203	0	300	300
14	RUS	Alexandra Trusova	1100	2017/2018 season (100%)	500	350	250	0	0
15	USA	Karen Chen	1065	2017/2018 season (100%)	418	213	191	243	0
16	JPN	Marin Honda	1027	2017/2018 season (100%)	0	262	262	300	203
16	USA	Mirai Nagasu	1027	2017/2018 season (100%)	465	292	0	270	0
18	RUS	Alena Kostornaia	1015	2017/2018 season (100%)	450	315	250	0	0
19	GER	Nicole Schott	1014	2017/2018 season (100%)	339	213	0	243	219
20	USA	Mariah Bell	985	2017/2018 season (100%)	551	236	0	198	0
21	JPN	Rika Hongo	944	2017/2018 season (100%)	0	236	213	270	225
22	SUI	Alexia Paganini	939	2017/2018 season (100%)	446	0	0	250	243
23	BEL	Loena Hendrickx	884	2017/2018 season (100%)	551	108	0	225	0
24	KOR	Hanul Kim	859	2017/2018 season (100%)	496	0	0	203	160
24	RUS	Elena Radionova	859	2017/2018 season (100%)	0	324	292	243	0
26	KOR	Dabin Choi	857	2017/2018 season (100%)	638	0	0	219	0
27	JPN	Yuna Shiraiwa	855	2017/2018 season (100%)	0	236	191	225	203
28	RUS	Alena Leonova	845	2017/2018 season (100%)	0	236	213	198	198
29	SVK	Nicole Rajičová	838	2017/2018 season (100%)	496	0	0	182	160
30	JPN	Mako Yamashita	833	2017/2018 season (100%)	405	225	203	0	0
31	RUS	Serafima Sakhanovich	832	2017/2018 season (100%)	0	262	0	300	270
32	SWE	Anita Östlund	820	2017/2018 season (100%)	156	133	108	225	198
33	FIN	Viveca Lindfors	819	2017/2018 season (100%)	247	97	0	250	225
34	ITA	Elisabetta Leccardi	815	2017/2018 season (100%)	146	97	97	250	225
35	USA	Angela Wang	806	2017/2018 season (100%)	362	0	0	225	219
36	GER	Lea Johanna Dastich	800	2017/2018 season (100%)	194	148	120	178	160
37	FIN	Emmi Peltonen	794	2017/2018 season (100%)	362	0	0	250	182
38	USA	Starr Andrews	788	2017/2018 season (100%)	446	164	0	178	0
39	USA	Courtney Hicks	754	2017/2018 season (100%)	0	292	0	243	219
40	AUS	Kailani Craine	747	2017/2018 season (100%)	222	0	0	300	225
41	CHN	Xiangning Li	741	2017/2018 season (100%)	325	191	0	225	0
42	CZE	Eliška Březinová	739	2017/2018 season (100%)	264	0	0	250	225
43	FRA	Maé-Bérénice Méité	737	2017/2018 season (100%)	402	191	0	144	0
44	KOR	Eunsoo Lim	735	2017/2018 season (100%)	328	225	182	0	0
45	RUS	Alisa Fedichkina	722	2017/2018 season (100%)	0	182	0	270	270
46	JPN	Rika Kihira	719	2017/2018 season (100%)	239	255	225	0	0
47	RUS	Elizaveta Tuktamysheva	699	2017/2018 season (100%)	0	213	0	243	243
48	ITA	Micol Cristini	692	2017/2018 season (100%)	192	0	0	250	250
49	FRA	Laurine Lecavelier	678	2017/2018 season (100%)	305	191	0	182	0
50	USA	Emmy Ma	640	2017/2018 season (100%)	75	203	164	198	0
51	ITA	Giada Russo	626	2017/2018 season (100%)	126	0	0	250	250
52	RUS	Polina Tsurskaya	616	2017/2018 season (100%)	0	324	292	0	0
53	SLO	Dasa Grm	606	2017/2018 season (100%)	131	0	0	250	225
54	CAN	Alaine Chartrand	600	2017/2018 season (100%)	402	0	0	198	0
55	KOR	Young You	561	2017/2018 season (100%)	215	182	164	0	0
56	AUS	Brooklee Han	534	2017/2018 season (100%)	214	0	0	160	160
56	RUS	Anastasia Tarakanova	534	2017/2018 season (100%)	0	284	250	0	0
58	SGP	Chloe Ing	532	2017/2018 season (100%)	126	0	0	203	203
59	BRA	Isadora Williams	529	2017/2018 season (100%)	106	0	0	225	198
60	RUS	Sofia Samodurova	500	2017/2018 season (100%)	0	250	250	0	0
61	HUN	Ivett Tóth	487	2017/2018 season (100%)	237	0	0	250	0
62	RUS	Daria Panenkova	480	2017/2018 season (100%)	0	250	230	0	0
63	LAT	Diana Nikitina	475	2017/2018 season (100%)	0	0	0	250	225
64	SWE	Matilda Algotsson	473	2017/2018 season (100%)	0	0	0	270	203
65	GER	Nathalie Weinzierl	469	2017/2018 season (100%)	0	0	0	250	219
66	UKR	Anna Khnychenkova	464	2017/2018 season (100%)	83	0	0	203	178
67	JPN	Yuhana Yokoi	459	2017/2018 season (100%)	295	164	0	0	0
68	AZE	Morgan Flood	450	2017/2018 season (100%)	0	0	0	225	225
68	AUT	Kerstin Frank	450	2017/2018 season (100%)	0	0	0	225	225
70	GBR	Natasha McKay	428	2017/2018 season (100%)	0	0	0	225	203
70	JPN	Rin Nitaya	428	2017/2018 season (100%)	0	0	0	250	178
72	KOR	So Hyun An	425	2017/2018 season (100%)	0	0	0	243	182
73	JPN	Yura Matsuda	423	2017/2018 season (100%)	0	0	0	225	198
74	GBR	Nina Povey	422	2017/2018 season (100%)	0	0	0	219	203
75	CAN	Alicia Pineault	415	2017/2018 season (100%)	237	0	0	178	0
76	USA	Ting Cui	414	2017/2018 season (100%)	266	148	0	0	0
77	JPN	Nana Araki	407	2017/2018 season (100%)	0	225	182	0	0
77	UKR	Anastasiia Arkhipova	407	2017/2018 season (100%)	141	133	133	0	0
77	GBR	Kristen Spours	407	2017/2018 season (100%)	61	0	0	182	164
80	USA	Caroline Zhang	397	2017/2018 season (100%)	0	0	0	219	178
81	GBR	Danielle Harrison	385	2017/2018 season (100%)	0	0	0	203	182
81	AUT	Natalie Klotz	385	2017/2018 season (100%)	0	0	0	203	182
81	SVK	Nina Letenayova	385	2017/2018 season (100%)	0	0	0	203	182
84	ITA	Lucrezia Gennaro	367	2017/2018 season (100%)	0	0	0	203	164
84	JPN	Riko Takino	367	2017/2018 season (100%)	0	203	164	0	0
84	SWE	Josefin Taljegard	367	2017/2018 season (100%)	0	0	0	203	164
87	NOR	Camilla Gjersem	346	2017/2018 season (100%)	0	0	0	182	164
88	NOR	Anne Line Gjersem	343	2017/2018 season (100%)	140	0	0	203	0
89	CAN	Michelle Long	336	2017/2018 season (100%)	192	0	0	144	0
90	CAN	Aurora Cotop	334	2017/2018 season (100%)	93	133	108	0	0
91	KOR	Ye Lim Kim	330	2017/2018 season (100%)	0	182	148	0	0
92	SRB	Antonina Dubinina	328	2017/2018 season (100%)	0	0	0	164	164
92	USA	Kaitlyn Nguyen	328	2017/2018 season (100%)	0	164	164	0	0
92	ITA	Chenny Paolucci	328	2017/2018 season (100%)	0	0	0	164	164
95	USA	Ashley Wagner	324	2017/2018 season (100%)	0	324	0	0	0
96	KAZ	Aiza Mambekova	316	2017/2018 season (100%)	113	0	0	203	0
97	JPN	Akari Matsuoka	315	2017/2018 season (100%)	0	182	133	0	0
98	USA	Amber Glenn	308	2017/2018 season (100%)	0	0	0	164	144
99	RUS	Alexandra Avstriyskaya	304	2017/2018 season (100%)	0	0	0	160	144
100	KOR	Soyoun Park	293	2017/2018 season (100%)	293	0	0	0	0
101	DEN	Pernille Sorensen	266	2017/2018 season (100%)	102	0	0	164	0
102	EST	Gerli Liinamäe	250	2017/2018 season (100%)	0	0	0	250	0
102	AUT	Sophia Schaller	250	2017/2018 season (100%)	0	0	0	250	0
102	NED	Niki Wories	250	2017/2018 season (100%)	0	0	0	250	0
105	THA	Thita Lamsam	247	2017/2018 season (100%)	83	0	0	164	0
106	ITA	Lucrezia Beccari	236	2017/2018 season (100%)	103	133	0	0	0
107	SWE	Selma Ihr	235	2017/2018 season (100%)	127	108	0	0	0
108	KOR	Hyun Soo Lee	228	2017/2018 season (100%)	0	120	108	0	0
108	CAN	Alison Schumacher	228	2017/2018 season (100%)	0	120	108	0	0
110	RUS	Anastasia Gulyakova	225	2017/2018 season (100%)	0	225	0	0	0
110	FRA	Lea Serna	225	2017/2018 season (100%)	0	0	0	225	0
112	RUS	Anastasia Gracheva	219	2017/2018 season (100%)	0	0	0	219	0
113	EST	Kristina Shkuleta-Gromova	217	2017/2018 season (100%)	0	120	97	0	0
114	RUS	Valeria Mikhailova	213	2017/2018 season (100%)	0	213	0	0	0
115	JPN	Rino Kasakake	203	2017/2018 season (100%)	0	203	0	0	0
115	ITA	Anna Memola	203	2017/2018 season (100%)	0	0	0	203	0
117	KAZ	Zhansaya Adykhanova	182	2017/2018 season (100%)	0	0	0	182	0
117	RUS	Anastasiia Gubanova	182	2017/2018 season (100%)	0	182	0	0	0
117	FRA	Sandra Ramond	182	2017/2018 season (100%)	0	0	0	182	0
117	GBR	Karly Robertson	182	2017/2018 season (100%)	0	0	0	182	0
117	FIN	Jenni Saarinen	182	2017/2018 season (100%)	0	0	0	182	0
117	AUT	Alisa Stomakhina	182	2017/2018 season (100%)	0	0	0	182	0
123	CHN	Hongyi Chen	180	2017/2018 season (100%)	83	97	0	0	0
124	CAN	Emy Decelles	178	2017/2018 season (100%)	0	0	0	178	0
125	HKG	Yi Christy Leung	174	2017/2018 season (100%)	174	0	0	0	0
126	FRA	Julie Froetscher	164	2017/2018 season (100%)	0	0	0	164	0
126	SWE	Elin Hallberg	164	2017/2018 season (100%)	0	0	0	164	0
126	BUL	Svetoslava Ryadkova	164	2017/2018 season (100%)	0	0	0	164	0
126	ROU	Julia Sauter	164	2017/2018 season (100%)	0	0	0	164	0
126	GER	Alissa Scheidt	164	2017/2018 season (100%)	0	0	0	164	0
126	KOR	Suh Hyun Son	164	2017/2018 season (100%)	0	0	0	164	0
126	SUI	Yasmine Kimiko Yamada	164	2017/2018 season (100%)	0	0	0	164	0
133	HUN	Fruzsina Medgyesi	160	2017/2018 season (100%)	0	0	0	160	0
134	AUT	Stefanie Pesendorfer	157	2017/2018 season (100%)	157	0	0	0	0
135	CHN	Ziquan Zhao	156	2017/2018 season (100%)	156	0	0	0	0
136	USA	Tessa Hong	148	2017/2018 season (100%)	0	148	0	0	0
136	JPN	Moa Iwano	148	2017/2018 season (100%)	0	148	0	0	0
136	USA	Ashley Lin	148	2017/2018 season (100%)	0	148	0	0	0
136	JPN	Akari Matsubara	148	2017/2018 season (100%)	0	148	0	0	0
140	ARM	Anastasia Galustyan	144	2017/2018 season (100%)	0	0	0	144	0
140	USA	Hannah Miller	144	2017/2018 season (100%)	0	0	0	144	0
142	TPE	Amy Lin	140	2017/2018 season (100%)	140	0	0	0	0
143	USA	Hanna Harrell	133	2017/2018 season (100%)	0	133	0	0	0
144	KOR	Su Been Jeon	120	2017/2018 season (100%)	0	120	0	0	0
144	UKR	Sofiia Nesterova	120	2017/2018 season (100%)	0	120	0	0	0
144	FIN	Sofia Sula	120	2017/2018 season (100%)	0	120	0	0	0
147	BUL	Alexandra Feigin	114	2017/2018 season (100%)	114	0	0	0	0
148	KOR	Eun Bi Ko	108	2017/2018 season (100%)	0	108	0	0	0
149	HKG	Joanna So	102	2017/2018 season (100%)	102	0	0	0	0
150	TUR	Guzide Irmak Bayir	97	2017/2018 season (100%)	0	97	0	0	0
150	USA	Angelina Huang	97	2017/2018 season (100%)	0	97	0	0	0
152	LTU	Elzbieta Kropa	92	2017/2018 season (100%)	92	0	0	0	0
152	THA	Natalie Sangkagalo	92	2017/2018 season (100%)	92	0	0	0	0
154	SVK	Silvia Hugec	74	2017/2018 season (100%)	74	0	0	0	0
155	GER	Ann-Christin Marold	68	2017/2018 season (100%)	68	0	0	0	0
156	KAZ	Alana Toktarova	55	2017/2018 season (100%)	55	0	0	0	0
157	NED	Kyarha Van Tiel	44	2017/2018 season (100%)	44	0	0	0	0

== See also ==
- 2017–18 ISU World Standings
- ISU World Standings
- ISU Season's World Ranking
- 2017–18 figure skating season
- 2017–18 synchronized skating season
