= Sherlock Biosciences =

American biotechnology company

Sherlock Biosciences was a biotechnology company based in Cambridge, Massachusetts that developed diagnostic tests using CRISPR-Cas13. The company was founded in 2019 by Feng Zhang, Jim Collins, Omar Abudayyeh, and Jonathan Gootenberg of the Broad Institute and MIT.

Cas13 was discovered by teams led by Zhang and Eugene Koonin using computational methods, then further characterized by Jennifer Doudna's team at the University of California, Berkeley. In 2020, both Sherlock Biosciences and Mammoth Biosciences from Doudna's lab at UC Berkeley used their similar CRISPR technologies to develop tests for COVID-19.

In 2021, Sherlock Biosciences and The Forsyth Institute announced a strategic partnership focusing on the development of products related to the “detection of human biomarkers in oral cavity and other oral health applications."

In December 2024, Sherlock Biosciences was acquired by OraSure Technologies.

== See also ==
- Mammoth Biosciences
