= Nathan Chen programs =

Figure skating programs

Nathan Chen
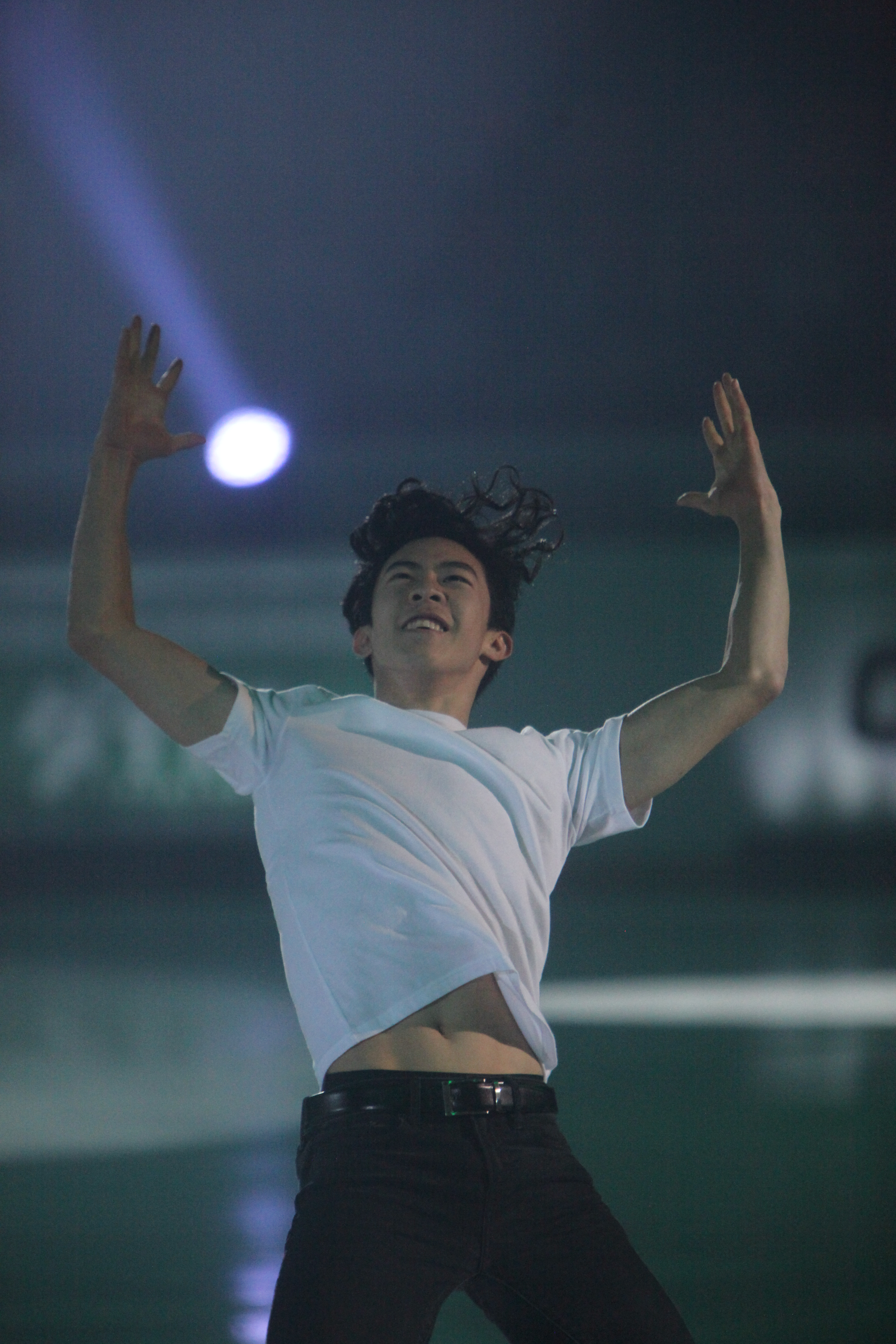
- Chen at 2018 Internationaux de France

Nathan Chen article series
- Skating career: Career achievements; Awards; Competition results; List of programs

Nathan Chen is an American figure skater who won his first competition in 2003 at age 3. He spent the beginning of his career in Salt Lake City, progressing through the lower levels of U.S. Figure Skating's developmental pipeline before relocating to Southern California in 2011. His first basic skills and pre-preliminary competition programs (Note: When figure skaters perform on the ice, they are performing a program. A figure skating program consists of choreographed moves set to music.) as a young skater were set to instrumental versions of Zip-A-Dee-Doo-Dah and Three Blind Mice. Chen qualified for his first U.S. Junior Figure Skating Championships in 2007 and rose through the juvenile and intermediate ranks between 2007 and 2009. A recording of his early 2007 exhibition performance to "I Just Can't Wait to Be King" from The Lion King resurfaced before the 2018 Winter Olympics. Chen made it to his first U.S. Figure Skating Championships in 2010 where, at 10 years old, he became the youngest novice champion in history, skating to music from Kung Fu Panda and Peter and the Wolf. At the end of the championships, he was featured in NBC's coverage of the exhibition gala and was later chosen as the ABC Person of the Week.

During his junior years, Chen performed to music from the Godfather soundtrack, Praeludium and Allegro, The Four Seasons, Michael Jackson, Glenn Miller and George Gershwin. He won the national junior title twice (2012, 2014) and the ISU Junior Grand Prix Final in 2015. Throughout the span of his senior career, Chen explored a plethora of musical genres, performing to classical works from Le Corsaire, Mao's Last Dancer, Prince Igor, Mozart, songs from avant-garde artists like Benjamin Clementine, piano pieces from Philip Glass, and music from the Desperado soundtrack. In the 2019–20 season, Chen skated to Armenian artist Charles Aznavour's "La Bohème" and music from the Elton John biopic Rocketman. Chen later decided to return to these two programs for the 2021–22 Olympic season where his win at the 2022 Winter Olympics in Beijing earned him a congratulatory shoutout from John. In November 2022, Chen starred in the official music video for the acoustic version of "Hold Me Closer" by John and Britney Spears. Between his senior debut in 2016 until his gold medal win in Beijing, Chen also won six U.S. titles, three world championships, and three Grand Prix Final titles, and broke national and world records multiple times.

== Programs ==
=== Competition and exhibition programs ===
- Program details mentioned at first occurrence.
- Olympic seasons highlighted in blue.

Competition and exhibition programs by season
Season	Short program	Free skate program	Exhibition program
2003–04	—N/a	"Zip-A-Dee-Doo-Dah": Composed by Allie Wrubel, Ray Gilbert; Choreo. by Stephanee Grosscup	—N/a
2004–05	—N/a	"Three Blind Mice": Composed by Thomas Ravenscroft; Choreo. by Stephanee Grosscup	—N/a
2005–06	—N/a	A Bug's Life: Composed by Randy Newman; Choreo. by Karel Kovar	—N/a
2006–07	—N/a	"Jupiter": From The Planets; Composed by Gustav Holst; Choreo. by Karel Kovar	"I Just Can't Wait to Be King": From The Lion King; Composed by Elton John, Tim Rice; Performed by Jason Weaver, Laura Williams
2007–08	—N/a	The Nutcracker: Composed by Tchaikovsky; Choreo. by Karel Kovar	—N/a
2008–09	The Nutcracker: Choreo. by Stephanie Grosscup	Transformers: Composed by Steve Jablonsky; Choreo. by Stephanie Grosscup	—N/a
2009–10	Kung Fu Panda: Composed by Hans Zimmer; Choreo. by Stephanie Grosscup	Peter and the Wolf: Composed by Sergei Prokofiev; Choreo. by Evgenia Chernyshova	Peter and the Wolf
2010–11	"Rawhide": Composed by Dimitri Tiomkin; Choreo. by Evgenia Chernyshova	Hungarian Rhapsody No. 2: Composed by Sergei Prokofiev; Choreo. by Evgenia Chernyshova	"Rawhide"
2011–12	WALL-E: Composed by Thomas Newman; Choreo. by Stephanie Grosscup	The Godfather: Composed by Nino Rota; Choreo. by Evgenia Chernyshova	"Stereo Hearts": Performed by Gym Class Heroes; Choreo. by Evgenia Chernyshova
2012–13	Praeludium and Allegro: Composed by Fritz Kreisler; Choreo. by Nadia Kanaeva, Rafael Arutyunyan	The Three Musketeers: Composed by Paul Haslinger; Choreo. by Stephanee Grosscup	—N/a
2013–14	The Four Seasons: Composed by Antonio Vivaldi; Choreo. by Nadia Kanaeva	Medley: 1. "Chattanooga Choo Choo"; Composed by Glenn Miller; 2. "Summertime"; Composed by George Gershwin; Choreo. by Nadia Kanaeva	"Home": Performed by Phillip Phillips; Choreo. by Phillip Mills
2014–15	Michael Jackson Medley: Performed by Michael Jackson; Choreo. by Nadia Kanaeva; Tracks used: 1. "Smile"; 2. "Smooth Criminal"	Piano Concerto No. 1 in E minor: Composed by Frédéric Chopin; Choreo. by Nadia Kanaeva	"Best Day of My Life": Performed by American Authors; Choreo. by Adam Rippon
2015–16	Michael Jackson Medley	Organ Symphony: Composed by Camille Saint-Saëns; Choreo. by Nikolai Morozov	"Dream On": Performed by Aerosmith
2016–17	Le Corsaire: Composed by Adolphe Adam; Choreo. by Marina Zueva	Polovtsian Dances: From Prince Igor; Composed by Alexander Borodin; Choreo. by Nadia Kanaeva	"Parachute": Performed by Otto Knows; Choreo. by Benoît Richaud
2016–17	Le Corsaire: Composed by Adolphe Adam; Choreo. by Marina Zueva	Polovtsian Dances: From Prince Igor; Composed by Alexander Borodin; Choreo. by Nadia Kanaeva	"Stole the Show": Performed by Kygo ft. Parson James
2017–18	"Nemesis": Composed by Benjamin Clementine; Choreo. by Shae-Lynn Bourne	Mao's Last Dancer: 1. Mao's Last Dancer; Composed by Christopher Gordon; 2. The Rite of Spring; Composed by Igor Stravinsky; Choreo. by Lori Nichol	"Parachute"
2017–18	"Nemesis": Composed by Benjamin Clementine; Choreo. by Shae-Lynn Bourne	Mao's Last Dancer: 1. Mao's Last Dancer; Composed by Christopher Gordon; 2. The Rite of Spring; Composed by Igor Stravinsky; Choreo. by Lori Nichol	"Nemesis"
2017–18	"Nemesis": Composed by Benjamin Clementine; Choreo. by Shae-Lynn Bourne	Mao's Last Dancer: 1. Mao's Last Dancer; Composed by Christopher Gordon; 2. The Rite of Spring; Composed by Igor Stravinsky; Choreo. by Lori Nichol	"Back from the Edge": Performed by James Arthur
2017–18	"Nemesis": Composed by Benjamin Clementine; Choreo. by Shae-Lynn Bourne	Mao's Last Dancer: 1. Mao's Last Dancer; Composed by Christopher Gordon; 2. The Rite of Spring; Composed by Igor Stravinsky; Choreo. by Lori Nichol	"No Good": Performed by Kaleo; Choreo. by Shae-Lynn Bourne
2018–19	"Caravan": 1. Moliendo Café; 2. "Caravan"; Performed by Fanfare Ciocărlia; Choreo. by Shae-Lynn Bourne	"Land of All": Composed by Woodkid; Choreo. by Marie-France Dubreuil, Samuel Chouinard	"Next to Me": Performed by Otto Knows
2018–19	"Caravan": 1. Moliendo Café; 2. "Caravan"; Performed by Fanfare Ciocărlia; Choreo. by Shae-Lynn Bourne	"Land of All": Composed by Woodkid; Choreo. by Marie-France Dubreuil, Samuel Chouinard	"Nemesis"
2018–19	"Caravan": 1. Moliendo Café; 2. "Caravan"; Performed by Fanfare Ciocărlia; Choreo. by Shae-Lynn Bourne	"Land of All": Composed by Woodkid; Choreo. by Marie-France Dubreuil, Samuel Chouinard	"No Good"
2019–20	"La Bohème": Performed by Charles Aznavour; Choreo. by Shae-Lynn Bourne	Rocket Man: Composed by Elton John, Bernie Taupin; Choreo. by Marie-France Dubreuil, Samuel Chouinard; Tracks used: 1. "Goodbye Yellow Brick Road"; 2. "Rocket Man"; 3. "Bennie and the Jets"	"Next to Me"
2020–21	Desperado: 1. "Asturias (Suite Española)"; Composed by Frida Lopez; 2. "Canción del Mariachi"; Performed by Antonio Banderas, Los Lobos; Choreo. by Shae-Lynn Bourne	Philip Glass medley: Composed by Philip Glass; Choreo. by Shae-Lynn Bourne; Tracks used: 1. "Metamorphosis II"; 2. Violin Concerto No. 1; 3. Truman Sleeps	Rocket Man
2021–22	"Eternity": 1. "Eternity"; 2. "Nemesis"; Performed by Benjamin Clementine; Choreo. by Shae-Lynn Bourne	Mozart Medley: Composed by Wolfgang Amadeus Mozart; Choreo. by Shae-Lynn Bourne; Tracks used: 1. Piano Concerto No. 23; 2. Lacrymosa; 3. "Lacrymosa (Apashe remix")	"The Nights": Performed by Avicii
2021–22	"La Bohème"	Rocket Man	"Caravan"
2021–22	"La Bohème"	Rocket Man	"Space Song": Performed by Beach House; Choreo. by Massimo Scali
2021–22	"La Bohème"	Rocket Man	Rocket Man

=== Show programs as a competitive skater ===
- Live collaborations with other skaters and artists are highlighted in purple.
- Programs performed at three or more ice shows within the same year are only listed with selected shows.
- Show openings and finales are not included in the list.

Show programs from 2003–2022
Year	Program	Event
2003	Penguin Cafe Orchestra Medley: Composed by Penguin Cafe Orchestra; Performed live with Stephanie Rosenthal and other skaters; Choreo. by Douglas Webster; Tracks used: 1. Air À Danser; 2. Southern Jukebox Music; 3. Numbers 1–4	Community ice theatre, Salt Lake City (Note: The piece consists of three movements: 1. The offerings to the young king, 2. The sky falls, 3. Building the Rainbow and the Golden Comet. The young king is crowned, and his imagination transforms colors into rainbows of hope. The sky falls, and the young king sees the sadness in the world. However, he is able to capture the spirit of the golden comet that allows him to bring beauty and joy back to the world and to restore the sky. The goal of Ice Dance International is to build community through skating.)
2007	"I Just Can't Wait to Be King"	Salt Lake City show
2010	Peter and the Wolf	WIWA
2010	"Singin' in the Rain": Composed by Nacio Herb Brown, Arthur Freed; Performed live with Richard "Mr. Debonair" Dwyer; Choreo. by David Liu	WIWA (Note: WIWA is an abbreviation for “Wind and Water.” Choreographer David Liu made Chen, who was 10, the star of the show. WIWA was a story about the journey of a boy who wanted to experiment with wind and water, about his fantasy of meeting different people and flying in the wind and playing with water. Chen also performed with Richard Dwyer, a well-known skater known as “Mr Debonair” because he used to always hand out roses to the women in the audience. Liu created a program for Chen and Dwyer envisioning a grandfather and grandson or older and younger generation meeting.)
2010	Kung Fu Panda	Sun Valley on Ice
2010	"Nathan and the Spider": From Fantastic Mr. Fox; Composed by Alexandre Desplat; Choreo. by Joel Dear; Tracks used: 1. "Mr. Fox's Promenade"	Sun Valley on Ice
2010	"Go the Distance": From Hercules; Composed by Alan Menken, David Zippel	Galleria Dallas
2011	"Stereo Hearts"	Michael Weiss Foundation Ice Champions
2012	"Stereo Hearts"	Skate Asia
2013	"Home"	An Evening with Champions
2014	"Best Day of My Life"	An Evening with Champions
2015	Michael Jackson Medley	An Evening with Champions
2016	"Stole the Show"	An Evening with Champions
2016	"Golden Slumbers": Performed by The Beatles; Choreo. by Phillip Mills	Sun Valley on Ice
2017	"Nemesis"	Sun Valley on Ice
2017	"Stole the Show"	Stars on Ice
2017	"Parachute"	Stars on Ice
2018	"Nemesis"	Dreams on Ice, Stars on Ice
2018	"Back from the Edge"	Stars on Ice
2018	"Land of All"	Sun Valley on Ice
2018	"Caravan"	Sun Valley on Ice, The Ice
2018	"The Other Side": From The Greatest Showman; Performed by Hugh Jackman, Zac Efron; Performed live with Shoma Uno, Jin Boyang	The Ice
2018	"Tu Sei": Performed by Vittorio Grigolo; Performed live with Nobunari Oda, Jin Boyang, Dmitri Aliev, Sergei Voronov, Morgan Cipres, Alina Zagitova, Mirai Nagasu, Takato Mura; Choreo. by David Wilson	The Ice
2019	"Nemesis"	All That Skate
2019	"Next to Me"	All That Skate, Stars on Ice
2019	"Thunder": Performed by Imagine Dragons; Performed live with Shoma Uno, Javier Fernández, Lee June-hyoung; Choreo. by Sandra Bezic, David Wilson	All That Skate
2019	"Land of All"	Dreams on Ice
2019	"La Boheme"	The Ice
2019	Rocket Man	Sun Valley on Ice
2020	Rocket Man	Carnival on Ice
2021	"Caravan"	Sun Valley on Ice
2021	Rocket Man	Sun Valley on Ice
2022	"Space Song"	Stars on Ice
2022	Rocket Man	Stars on Ice

=== Programs after the 2022 Winter Olympics ===
Show programs after the 2021–22 season
Year	Program	Event
2022	Rocket Man	Dreams On Ice
2022	"The Nights"	Sun Valley on Ice
2022	"Heat Waves": Performed by Glass Animals; Choreo. by Sam Chouinard	The Ice
2022	Mozart Medley	The Ice
2022	"Gabriel's Oboe": From The Mission; Composed by Ennio Morricone; Performed live with Shoma Uno; Choreo. by Miki Sakagami	The Ice
2022	"Let It Be": Performed by The Beatles	Vail Skating Festival Ice Spectacular
2022	Rocket Man"	Vail Skating Festival Ice Spectacular
2023	"Vienna": Performed by Billy Joel	Ice Chips
2023	"Mr. Blue Sky": Performed by Electric Light Orchestra	Ice Chips
2023	"Hold Me Closer": Performed by Elton John, Britney Spears; Choreo. by Jean-Luc Baker, Nathan Chen	Stars On Ice
2023	"Mr. Blue Sky"	Stars On Ice
2023	"Hold On Tight"/"The Dreamer in Her" (Laz Masso & Jon Schulder Remix): Performed by Thomas Azier; Choreo. by Nathan Chen	The Ice
2023	"Mr. Blue Sky"	The Ice
2023	"On the Nature of Daylight": Composed by Max Richter; Performed live with Shoma Uno; Choreo. by Yuka Sato	The Ice
2023	"Hold On Tight"/"The Dreamer in Her"	Sun Valley on Ice
2023	"Vienna"	20th Annual Detroit Tree Lighting
2023	"It's the Most Wonderful Time of the Year": Composed by Edward Pola, George Wyle; Performed by Andy Williams	20th Annual Detroit Tree Lighting
2023	"Ladies Love Country Boys": Composed by Jamey Johnson, Rivers Rutherford, George Teren; Performed live with Trace Adkins	Scott Hamilton & Friends
2023	"Viva la Vida": Composed by Chris Martin, Guy Berryman, Johnny Buckland, Will Champion; Performed by Coldplay	Vail Skating Festival Ice Spectacular
2023	"Hold On Tight"/"The Dreamer in Her"	Vail Skating Festival Ice Spectacular

Other programs, projects and collaborations
Year	Program	Video
2022	"Hold Me Closer": Choreo. by Nathan Chen	Elton John, Britney Spears (Acoustic) (Official Video) (Stars On Ice)
