= Million Voices =

Single by Otto Knows
- Released: 31 May 2012
- Recorded: 2012
- Genre: Progressive house
- Length: 5:57 (original mix); 3:10 (radio edit)
- Label: Refune, Mercury
- Songwriter: Otto Jettman
- Producer: Otto Knows

Otto Knows singles chronology
"iTrack" (2011)	"Million Voices" (2012)	"Parachute" (2014)

Music video
- "Million Voices" on YouTube

Music video
- "Sampled From Wyclef Jean - Million Voices" on YouTube

"Million Voices" is a song by Swedish DJ and producer Otto Knows. It was released in Belgium as a digital download on 31 May 2012. The song has charted in Belgium, the Netherlands, the United Kingdom and Sweden.

== Background and composition ==
"Million Voices" is a mostly instrumental track that samples Wyclef Jean's 2005 single of the same name.

Knows said that the song was inspired by "Calling (Lose My Mind)" by his compatriots Sebastian Ingrosso and Alesso, who had been finishing up their track in the recording studio next to him. "I could hear how good it sounded," Knows told MusicRadar. "I thought to myself, I needed to do something and had all this inspiration. I started with the voice samples from a sample pack and the idea was finished within a day I think."

== Music video ==
An accompanying music video for the song was released on 18 November 2012. It was filmed in Lésigny, Seine-et-Marne, France. As of September 2024, the video has received over 42 million views on YouTube.

== Track listing ==
=== Digital download ===
1. "Million Voices" – 5:57 (original mix)

=== iTunes EP ===
1. "Million Voices (Radio Edit) – 3:13
2. "Million Voices (Extended Mix) – 5:58
3. "Million Voices (TORN Remix) – 6:26

== Charts ==
=== Weekly charts ===
Chart (2012–2013)	Peak position
Australia (ARIA)	44
Austria (Ö3 Austria Top 40)	14
Belgium (Ultratop 50 Flanders)	3
Belgium (Ultratop 50 Wallonia)	5
Czech Republic Airplay (ČNS IFPI)	73
Denmark (Tracklisten)	35
France (SNEP)	52
Germany (GfK)	20
Hungary (Dance Top 40)	16
Hungary (Rádiós Top 40)	14
Ireland (IRMA)	15
Netherlands (Dutch Top 40)	5
Netherlands (Single Top 100)	6
Poland Dance (ZPAV)	42
Poland (Polish Airplay New)	1
Romania (Airplay 100)	40
Scotland Singles (Official Charts)	13
Slovakia Airplay (ČNS IFPI)	40
Sweden (Sverigetopplistan)	36
Switzerland (Schweizer Hitparade)	19
UK Dance (Official Charts)	2
UK Singles (Official Charts)	14
US Hot Dance/Electronic Songs (Billboard)	39

=== Year-end charts ===
Chart (2012)	Position
Belgium (Ultratop Flanders)	36
Belgium (Ultratop Wallonia)	48
Hungary (Dance Top 40)	84
Hungary (Rádiós Top 40)	72
Netherlands (Dutch Top 40)	30
Netherlands (Single Top 100)	49
UK Singles (Official Charts Company)	107
Chart (2013)	Position
Hungary (Dance Top 40)	42
UK Singles (Official Charts Company)	176
US Hot Dance/Electronic Songs (Billboard)	92

== Certifications ==
Region	Certification	Certified units/sales
Australia (ARIA)	Gold	35,000^{^}
Belgium (BRMA)	Gold	15,000^{*}
Brazil (Pro-Música Brasil)	Gold	30,000^{‡}
Germany (BVMI)	Platinum	300,000^{‡}
New Zealand (RMNZ)	Platinum	30,000^{‡}
Sweden (GLF)	Platinum	40,000^{‡}
United Kingdom (BPI)	Platinum	600,000^{‡}
Streaming
Denmark (IFPI Danmark)	Platinum	1,800,000^{†}
^{*} Sales figures based on certification alone.^{^} Shipments figures based on certification alone.^{‡} Sales+streaming figures based on certification alone.^{†} Streaming-only figures based on certification alone.

== Release history ==
Region	Date	Format	Label
Belgium	31 May 2012	Digital download	Refune Records
