= List of career achievements by Nathan Chen =

Nathan Chen
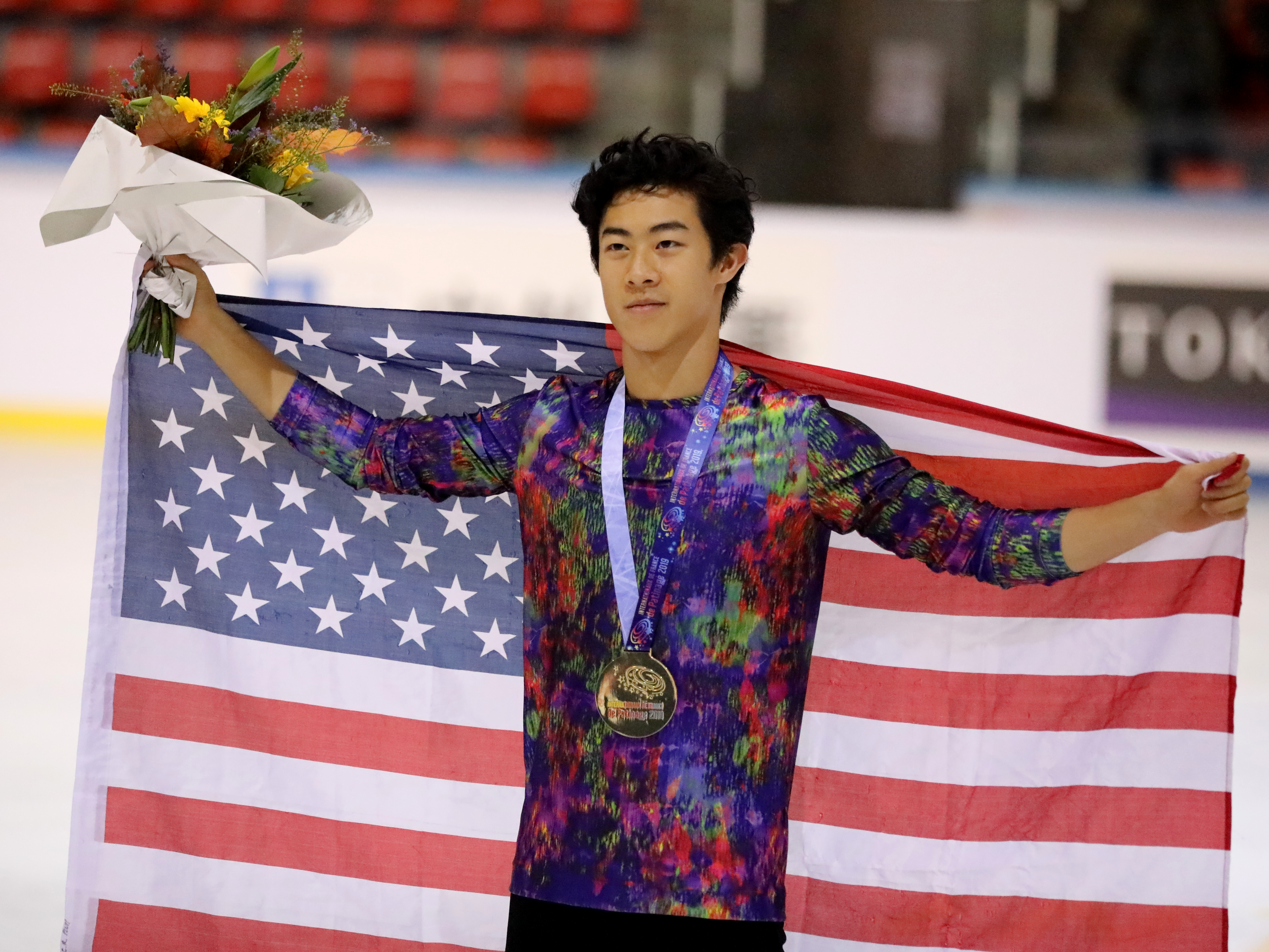
- Chen at 2019 Internationaux de France

Nathan Chen article series
- Skating career: Career achievements; Awards; Competition results; List of programs

Nathan Chen is an American figure skater who made his senior debut in international competition in 2016. Chen, the 2022 Olympic champion and a three-time world champion (2018, 2019, 2021), was the first skater to land five types of quadruple jumps in competition, the first skater to land six quadruple jumps in a free program, and the first skater to land eight quadruple jumps across a single competition. Chen has broken multiple world and national records and is the current world record holder for two competition segments in the senior men's discipline; the short program and combined total score, and former world record holder in the free skate.

When Chen captured his first U.S. title at the 2017 U.S Championships at age 17, he became the youngest national champion since Dick Button (1946). That same year, he won the Four Continents title and the first of three successive grand prix final titles. Chen won his first world title in 2018 and became the youngest world champion since Evgeni Plushenko (2001). He repeated as world champion in 2019, and in 2021, he was the first U.S. man to win three world titles in a row since Scott Hamilton (1982–1984). (Note: The 2020 World Championships were canceled as a result of the COVID-19 pandemic.) In early January 2022, Chen became the first man to win six consecutive U.S. championships since Button (1946–52), and a month later, at the 2022 Winter Olympics in Beijing, he was the first Asian American man to win Olympic gold.

Chen has received numerous accolades in recognition of his achievements and impact. In the ensuing months after he stood atop the podium in Beijing, Chen earned nominations for several notable awards, including a Laureus World Sports Award, a People's Choice Award, an ESPY, and a James E. Sullivan Award. He was named Most Valuable Skater at the International Skating Union's ISU Awards in 2023, and Time magazine included him in its annual list of the 100 most influential people in the world in 2022.

== World record scores ==
Chen set seven world record scores in the +5/-5 grade of execution (GOE) system; one in the short program, three in the free program, and three in the combined total score. (Note: Figure skating was formerly judged in a system with a 6.0 scale. The International Skating Union adopted a new judging system in 2003 based on a code of points, using grades of execution (GOE) within a range of −3 to +3. The range changed to −5 to +5 from the 2018–19 season.)

- SP – Short program
- FS – Free skating

Chronological list of world record scores in the +5/-5 GOE system
| No. | Date | Score | Seg. | Event | Note |
|---|---|---|---|---|---|
| 1 | Oct 20, 2018 | 189.99 | FS | 2018 Skate America | Chen broke Mikhail Kolyada's record from September 2018. |
| 2 | Oct 20, 2018 | 280.57 | Total | 2018 Skate America | Chen broke Shoma Uno's record from September 2018. |
| 3 | Mar 23, 2019 | 216.02 | FS | 2019 World Championships | Chen broke Yuzuru Hanyu's record from November 2018. |
| 4 | Mar 23, 2019 | 323.42 | Total | 2019 World Championships | Chen broke Hanyu's record from November 2018. |
| 5 | Dec 7, 2019 | 224.92 | FS | 2019–20 Grand Prix Final | Chen broke his own record from March 2019. |
| 6 | Dec 7, 2019 | 335.30 | Total | 2019–20 Grand Prix Final | Chen broke his own record from March 2019. |
| 7 | Feb 8, 2022 | 113.97 | SP | 2022 Winter Olympics | Chen broke Hanyu's record from February 2020. |

== Firsts and other records ==
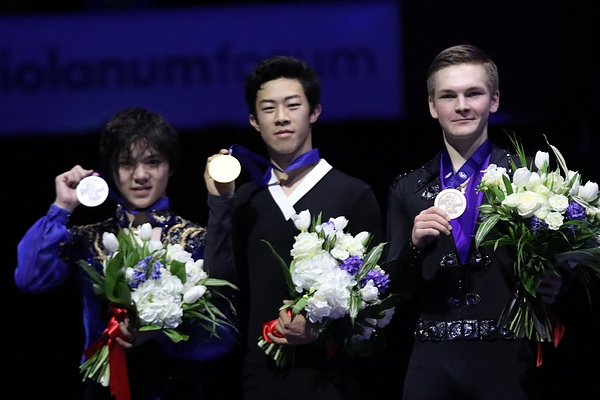
Chen (center) with Shoma Uno (left) and Mikhail Kolyada (right) at the medal ceremony at the 2018 World Championships

Chronological list of firsts and records in titles, medals, and scoring
| Date | Achievement | Event | Reference |
|---|---|---|---|
| Jan 18, 2010 | Youngest U.S men's novice champion in history at 10 years old | 2010 U.S. Figure Skating Championships | |
| Jan 24, 2011 | First male skater to repeat as U.S. novice champion | 2011 U.S. Figure Skating Championships | |
| Jan 7–9, 2014 | Broke the U.S. national junior men's record for the short program (79.61) | 2014 U.S. Figure Skating Championships | |
| Jan 7–9, 2014 | Broke the U.S. national junior men's record for the combined total score (223.93) | 2014 U.S. Figure Skating Championships | |
| Dec 8, 2016 | Youngest man to medal at a Grand Prix Final since Evgeni Plushenko in 1999 | 2016 Grand Prix Final | |
| Jan 21, 2017 | Broke the U.S. national record for the short program (106.39) | 2017 U.S. Championships | |
| Jan 21, 2017 | Broke the U.S. national record for the free skate (212.08) | 2017 U.S. Championships | |
| Jan 21, 2017 | Broke the U.S. national record for combined total score (318.47) | 2017 U.S. Championships | |
| Jan 21, 2017 | Youngest U.S. men's champion since Dick Button in 1966 | 2017 U.S. Championships | |
| Feb 19, 2017 | Youngest Four Continents Champion in history at 17 (until Kao Miura's win in 2023) | 2017 Four Continents Championships | |
| Mar 24, 2018 | Youngest (18 years old) men's world champion since Evgeni Plushenko in 2001 | 2018 World Championships | |
| Mar 24, 2018 | New record for the largest margin of victory (47.63 points) in any event at an Olympics, worlds or Grand Prix Final under the historical +3/-3 Grade of Execution (GOE) ISU Judging System | 2018 World Championships | |
| Jan 27, 2019 | Broke his own U.S. national short program record from 2017 (113.42) | 2019 U.S. Championships | |
| Jan 27, 2019 | Broke his own U.S. national free skate record from 2017 (228.80) | 2019 U.S. Championships | |
| Jan 27, 2019 | Broke his own U.S. national record for combined total from 2017 (342.22) | 2019 U.S. Championships | |
| Jan 27, 2019 | First skater to win three consecutive U.S. titles since Johnny Weir (2004–2006) | 2019 U.S. Championships | |
| Nov 2, 2019 | First skater to win eight Grand Prix events in a row since Evgeni Plushenko in 2001 | 2019 Internationaux de France | |
| Jan 26, 2020 | Broke his own U.S. national short program record from 2019 (114.13) | 2020 U.S. Championships | |
| Jan 26, 2020 | First skater to win four consecutive U.S. titles since Brian Boitano in 1988 | 2020 U.S. Championships | |
| Jan 17, 2021 | First skater to win five consecutive U.S. titles since Dick Button (1946–1952) | 2021 U.S. Championships | |
| Mar 27, 2021 | First U.S. man to win three consecutive world titles since Scott Hamilton (1982–1984) | 2021 World Championships | |
| Mar 27, 2021 | First male skater to win three consecutive world titles since Patrick Chan (2011–2013) | 2021 World Championships | |
| Jan 9, 2022 | Broke his own U.S. national short program record from 2020 (115.39) | 2022 U.S. Championships | |
| Jan 9, 2022 | First skater to win six consecutive U.S. titles in 70 years since Dick Button | 2022 U.S. Championships | |
| Feb 10, 2022 | First Asian American man to earn Olympic gold at the Olympics in single skating | 2022 Winter Olympics | |

Firsts and records in technical elements
| Date | Achievement | Event | Details | Reference |
|---|---|---|---|---|
| Jan 22–24, 2016 | First U.S. skater to land two quadruple jumps in the short program | 2016 U.S. Championships | | |
| Jan 22–24, 2016 | First U.S. skater to land four quadruple jumps in the free skate | 2016 U.S. Championships | | |
| Jan 22–24, 2016 | First U.S. skater to land six quadruple jumps across a single competition | 2016 U.S. Championships | | |
| Jan 21, 2017 | First skater in the world to land five quadruple jumps in a free skate | 2017 U.S. Championships | | |
| Sep 16, 2017 | First skater to land five different quadruple jumps (quadruple toe loop, quadruple Salchow, quadruple loop, quadruple flip, and quadruple Lutz) in competition | 2017 U.S. International Classic | | |
| Feb 17, 2018 | First skater to land six quadruple jumps in a free skate | 2018 Winter Olympics | | |
| Mar 24, 2018 | First skater to land eight quadruple jumps across a single competition | 2018 World Championships | | |
| Feb 4, 2022 | First skater to land a quadruple Lutz-triple toe loop combination in the second half of the short program | 2022 Winter Olympics ^{team} | | |

== Honors and accolades ==
Laureus World Sports Awards

- Breakthrough of the Year Award (nominated in 2023)

ISU Skating Awards

- Most Valuable Skater (2023)

ESPY Awards

- Best Olympian, Men's Sports Award (nominated in 2022)

People's Choice Awards

- Game Changer Award (nominated in 2022)

Amateur Athletic Union

- James E. Sullivan Award (nominated in 2022)

Committee of 100

- Trailblazer Award for Commitment to Excellence (2022)

Gold House

- A100 Honoree (2018, 2019, 2020)
- A100 Hall of Fame (2021)

Professional Skaters Association

- Gustave Lussi Award (2019, 2021, 2022)

United States Olympic & Paralympic Committee

- Male Olympic Athlete of the Year (2019)

U.S. Figure Skating

- Ron and Gayle Hershberger Award (2012)
- Athlete Alumni Ambassador Award (2011)
- Cecilia Colledge Memorial Fund Award (2010, 2011)

U.S. Figure Skating Hall of Fame

- Class of 2026.

=== Ice Theatre of New York ===
- Honoree (2026)

Media

- Time: Named to the Time100 List (the 100 most influential people in the world) (2022)
- Time: Named to the Time Next Generation Leaders List (2017)
- Forbes: Named to the Forbes 30 Under 30 Sports list (2020)
- Harper's Bazaar: Named to their list of "Icons" (2022)
- SportsPro: "Most Marketable Athletes" (#65 in 2022)
- The Salt Lake Tribune: Nominated for "Utahn of the Year" (2022)
- SKATING Magazine: Recipient of the "Reader's Choice Award" (Michelle Kwan Trophy) (2016–17, 2017–18 and 2018–2019)
- ABC News: Named Person of the Week (February 19, 2010)

Municipality

- Sun Valley: Presented with a key to the city (2022)
- Utah: Awarded a proclamation, making May 18 "Nathan Chen Day" (2022)
- Salt Lake County: Awarded a proclamation, making May 16 "Nathan Chen Day" (2018)

=== Yale University ===
- Statistics and Data Science Outstanding Thesis Award (2024)

== Medals and major titles ==
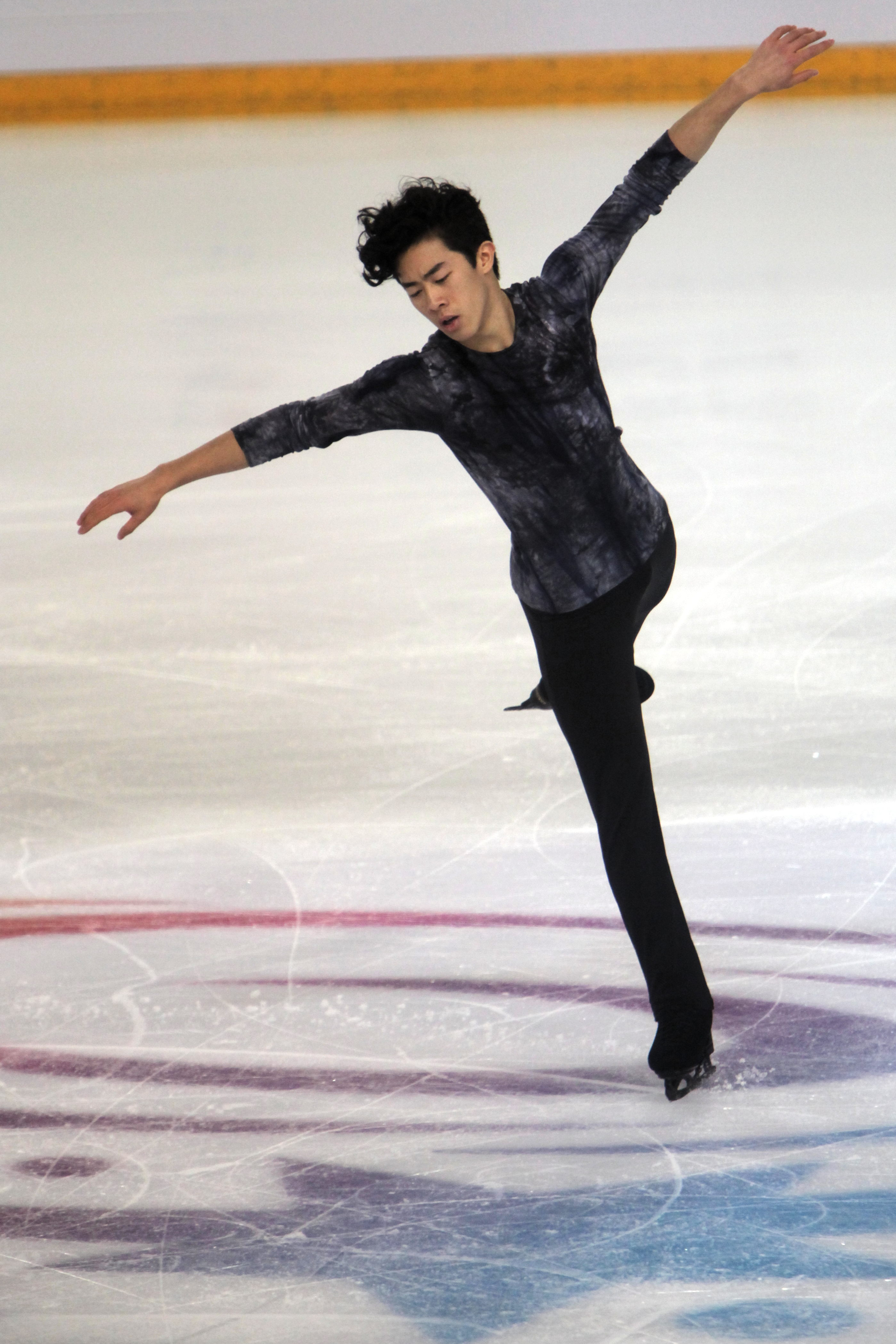
Nathan Chen at 2018 Internationaux de France

Throughout the years, Chen has won all major competitions at the junior and senior level except for junior worlds.

Chronological list of won major international senior and junior titles
| No. | Date | Competition | Reference |
|---|---|---|---|
| 1 | December 11, 2015 | Junior Grand Prix Final | Details |
| 2 | February 19, 2017 | Four Continents Championships | Details |
| 3 | December 8, 2017 | Grand Prix Final | Details |
| 4 | March 24, 2018 | World Championships | Details |
| 5 | December 7, 2018 | Grand Prix Final | Details |
| 6 | March 23, 2019 | World Championships | Details |
| 7 | December 7, 2019 | Grand Prix Final | Details |
| 8 | March 27, 2021 | World Championships | Details |
| 9 | February 10, 2022 | Winter Olympics | Details |

=== Medal record by event ===
- The list records medals and participations in senior and junior events.
- Medals at team events are included only by team result, not individual result.

Medal record at major international senior and junior events
| Season | Events | Gold | Silver | Bronze | Total |
|---|---|---|---|---|---|
| Winter Olympics | 3 | 2 | 0 | 1 | 3 |
| World Championships | 4 | 3 | 0 | 0 | 3 |
| Four Continents Championships | 1 | 1 | 0 | 0 | 1 |
| Grand Prix Final | 4 | 3 | 1 | 0 | 4 |
| Junior World Championships | 2 | 0 | 0 | 1 | 1 |
| Junior Grand Prix Final | 2 | 1 | 0 | 1 | 2 |
| Total | 16 | 10 | 1 | 3 | 14 |

Medal record at national senior and junior events
| Season | Events | Gold | Silver | Bronze | Total |
|---|---|---|---|---|---|
| (United States) U.S. Championships | 8 | 6 | 0 | 1 | 7 |
| (United States) U.S. Junior Championships | 3 | 2 | 0 | 1 | 3 |
| (United States) US Novice Championships | 2 | 2 | 0 | 0 | 2 |
| Total | 13 | 10 | 0 | 2 | 12 |

Medal record in the Grand Prix series
| Event | Events | Gold | Silver | Bronze | Total |
|---|---|---|---|---|---|
| (Japan) NHK Trophy | 1 | 0 | 1 | 0 | 1 |
| (Russia) Rostelecom Cup | 1 | 1 | 0 | 0 | 1 |
| Skate Canada | 1 | 1 | 0 | 0 | 1 |
| Internationaux de France | 2 | 2 | 0 | 0 | 2 |
| (United States) Skate America | 5 | 4 | 0 | 1 | 5 |
| Total | 10 | 8 | 1 | 1 | 10 |

Medal record in the Challenger Series and other international events
| Event | Part. | Gold | Silver | Bronze | Total |
|---|---|---|---|---|---|
| (United States) US International Classic | 1 | 1 | 0 | 0 | 1 |
| (Finland) Finlandia Trophy | 1 | 1 | 0 | 0 | 1 |
| Total | 2 | 2 | 0 | 0 | 2 |

Medal record in the Junior Grand Prix Series
| Event | Part. | Gold | Silver | Bronze | Total |
|---|---|---|---|---|---|
| JGP Austria | 1 | 1 | 0 | 0 | 1 |
| JGP Belarus | 1 | 1 | 0 | 0 | 1 |
| JGP Croatia | 2 | 0 | 1 | 0 | 1 |
| JGP Mexico | 1 | 1 | 0 | 0 | 1 |
| JGP Spain | 1 | 1 | 0 | 0 | 1 |
| (United States) JGP U.S. | 1 | 1 | 0 | 0 | 1 |
| Total | 7 | 5 | 1 | 0 | 6 |

Medal record at team events
| Event | Part. | Gold | Silver | Bronze | Total |
|---|---|---|---|---|---|
| Winter Olympics (Team) | 2 | 0 | 1 | 1 | 2 |
| World Team Trophy | 3 | 1 | 1 | 1 | 3 |
| Total | 5 | 1 | 2 | 2 | 5 |

=== Medal record by season ===
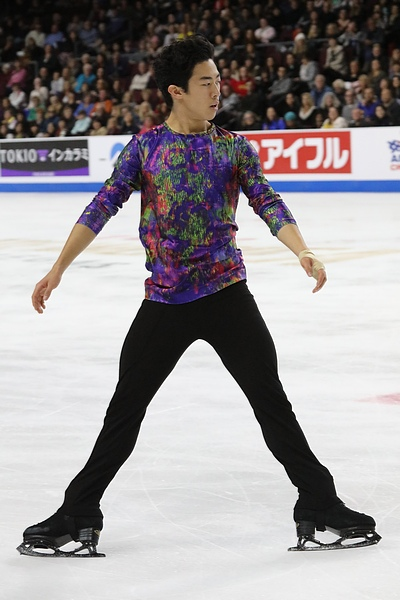
Chen at 2019 Skate America

- The list records medals and participations at national and international events.
- Medals at team events are included only by team result, not individual result.
- Withdrawals and cancelled events are not included in the list.

Medal record in novice seasons
| Season | Events | Gold | Silver | Bronze | Total |
|---|---|---|---|---|---|
| 2009–10 | 1 | 1 | 0 | 0 | 1 |
| 2010–11 | 1 | 1 | 0 | 0 | 1 |
| Total | 2 | 2 | 0 | 0 | 2 |

Medal record in junior seasons
| Season | Events | Gold | Silver | Bronze | Total |
|---|---|---|---|---|---|
| 2011–12 | 1 | 1 | 0 | 0 | 1 |
| 2012–13 | 2 | 1 | 0 | 1 | 2 |
| 2013–14 | 5 | 3 | 0 | 2 | 5 |
| 2014–15 | 2 | 0 | 1 | 0 | 1 |
| 2015–16 | 3 | 3 | 0 | 0 | 3 |
| Total | 13 | 8 | 1 | 2 | 11 |

Medal record in senior seasons
| Season | Events | Gold | Silver | Bronze | Total |
|---|---|---|---|---|---|
| 2016–17 | 8 | 3 | 2 | 1 | 6 |
| 2017–18 | 9 | 6 | 0 | 2 | 8 |
| 2018–19 | 7 | 6 | 0 | 1 | 7 |
| 2019–20 | 5 | 4 | 0 | 1 | 5 |
| 2020–21 | 5 | 4 | 1 | 0 | 5 |
| 2021–22 | 6 | 4 | 1 | 1 | 6 |
| Total | 40 | 27 | 4 | 6 | 37 |

== International record scores ==
=== International record scores by segment ===
Chen holds all current records except for the program component score in the men's short program which was set by Yuzuru Hanyu.

- TSS – Total segment score
- TES – Technical element score
- PCS – Program component score
- World record scores are highlighted in **bold and italic**
- Highest total segment scores (TSS) are recognized as world records by Guinness World Records.

Record scores by competition segment, including the TES and PCS
| Segment | Type | Score | Event | Date |
|---|---|---|---|---|
| Combined total | – | **335.30** | 2019 Grand Prix Final | Dec 7, 2019 |
| Short program | TES | 65.98 | 2022 Winter Olympics | Feb 8, 2022 |
| Short program | TSS | **113.97** | 2022 Winter Olympics | Feb 8, 2022 |
| Free skate | TES | 129.14 | 2019 Grand Prix Final | Dec 7, 2019 |
| Free skate | PCS | 97.22 | 2022 Winter Olympics | Feb 10, 2022 |
| Free skate | TSS | **224.92** | 2019 Grand Prix Final | Dec 7, 2019 |

Chen holds the historical record for the technical element score in the men's free skate. The other historical records were all set by Yuzuru Hanyu.

Historical record scores by competition segment, including the TES and PCS
| Segment | Type | Score | Event | Date |
|---|---|---|---|---|
| Free skate | TES | 127.64 | 2018 Winter Olympics | Feb 17, 2018 |

=== International record scores achieved at main events ===
The major international events include the Olympics (men's individual event), World Championships, Four Continent Championships, and the Grand Prix Final, but exclude the European Championships as Chen is ineligible to compete. Chen currently holds eight of the twelve records. Yuzuru Hanyu has the records for the short program and total combined score at Four Continents, and Shoma Uno achieved the highest scores for the free skate at Four Continents and the short program at Worlds.

- SP – Short program
- FS – Free skating
- World records highlighted in **bold and italic**

Record scores in the different competition segments by event
| Event | Segment | Score | Date |
|---|---|---|---|
| Winter Olympics | Total | 332.60 | Feb 10, 2022 |
| Winter Olympics | SP | **113.97** | Feb 8, 2022 |
| Winter Olympics | FS | 218.63 | Feb 10, 2022 |
| World Championships | Total | 323.42 | Mar 23, 2019 |
| World Championships | FS | 222.03 | Mar 27, 2021 |
| Grand Prix Final | Total | **335.30** | Dec 7, 2019 |
| Grand Prix Final | SP | 110.38 | Dec 5, 2019 |
| Grand Prix Final | FS | **224.92** | Dec 7, 2019 |

Chen set three of the twelve historical record scores at main events. The other nine records were set by Hanyu.

Historical record scores in the different competition segments by event
| Event | Segment | Score | Date |
|---|---|---|---|
| Winter Olympics | FS | 215.08 | Feb 17, 2018 |
| Four Continents | Total | 307.46 | Feb 19, 2017 |
| Four Continents | SP | 103.12 | Feb 17, 2017 |

=== International maximum scores ===
==== Technical element scores ====
Each technical element of a program is assigned a base value, which gives skaters credit for every element they perform. Some elements, such as spins, and step sequences, have levels of difficulty (level 1 is the lowest, level 4 is the highest) on which the base values are established. A judging panel grades the quality of each element using the grade of execution score (GOE) within a range of −5 to +5 (the historical system prior to the 2018–19 season had a range between +3/-3), which is added to or deducted from the base value. GOEs are proportional to the base value of each element. The highest and lowest scores for each element are thrown out, and the remaining scores are averaged to determine the final GOE for each element. The GOE is then added to or subtracted from the base value for each element, and the sum of the scores for all elements forms the technical score. In the current +5/-5 system, Chen has received 4 perfect scores for two technical elements in international competition, his choreographic sequence and level four step sequence.

- SP – Short program
- FS – Free skate
- Unanimous +5 GOE marks from the judging panel highlighted in **bold**

Technical elements with maximum score in the +5/-5 GOE system
| No. | Element | Score | +5s | Seg. | Event | Reference |
|---|---|---|---|---|---|---|
| 1 | ChSq1 | 5.50 | 8/9 | FS | (United States) 2019 Skate America | Details |
| 1 | ChSq1 | 5.50 | **9/9** | FS | 2019 Internationaux de France | Details |
| 1 | StSq4 | 5.85 | 6/7 | SP | (United States) 2020 Skate America | Details |
| 1 | StSq4 | 5.85 | 8/9 | SP | (China) 2022 Winter Olympics | Details |

Prior to the system change (before the 2018–19 season), Chen achieved one perfect score for his level four step sequence at the 2017 Grand Prix Final.

Technical elements with maximum score in the +3/-3 GOE system
| No. | Element | Score | +3s | Seg. | Event | Reference |
|---|---|---|---|---|---|---|
| 1 | Stsq4 | 6.00 | 8/9 | SP | (Japan) 2017 Grand Prix Final | Details |

== National record scores ==
Chen is the historical national record holder for the senior men's short program, the senior men's free skate, and accumulative score. He also holds the current national record scores for all three segments for the senior men's discipline at the U.S. Figure Skating Championships.

- SP – Short program
- FS – Free skating
- World record scores are highlighted in **bold and italic**
- Scores achieved at domestic competitions are not recognized by the International Skating Union as personal best scores. Only scores at sanctioned international events are considered as official and ratified national records.

U.S. national record scores by competition segment
| System | Segment | Score | Event |
|---|---|---|---|
| Current | Total | **335.30** | 2019 Grand Prix Final |
| Current | SP | **113.92** | 2022 Winter Olympics |
| Current | FS | **224.92** | 2019 Grand Prix Final |
| Historical | Total | 321.40 | 2018 World Championships |
| Historical | SP | 104.12 | 2017 Skate America |
| Historical | FS | 219.46 | 2018 World Championships |

Record scores at the U.S. Championships by competition segment
| System | Segment | Score | Event | Reference |
|---|---|---|---|---|
| Current | Total | 342.22 | 2019 U.S Championships | Details |
| Current | SP | 115.39 | 2022 U.S Championships | Details |
| Current | FS | 228.80 | 2019 U.S Championships | Details |
| Historical | Total | 318.47 | 2017 U.S. Championships | Details |
| Historical | SP | 106.39 | 2017 U.S. Championships | Details |
| Historical | FS | 212.08 | 2017 U.S. Championships | Details |

=== National maximum scores ===
Chen has received a total of seven perfect scores for technical elements at the U.S. Championships. In the current +5/-5 GOE system, Chen was awarded maximum scores for a step sequence, a choreographic sequence, a jump and a jump combination. In the old +3/-3 GOE system, he received perfect scores for two step sequences. Furthermore, Chen was awarded perfect 10.00s in the performance component for his free skate at the 2019 U.S. Championships.

- x – 10% bonus in the base value for a jump executed in the second half of the program
- Unanimous +5 GOE marks from the judging panel highlighted in **bold**

Technical elements with maximum score at the U.S. Championships in the +5/-5 GOE system
| No. | Element | Score | +5s | Seg. | Event | Reference |
|---|---|---|---|---|---|---|
| 1 | Stsq4 | 19.82 | 8/9 | SP | 2019 US Championships | Details |
| 2 | 4T3Tx | 19.82 | 8/9 | SP | 2019 US Championships | Details |
| 3 | 4Lz | 17.25 | **9/9** | FS | 2019 US Championships | Details |
| 4 | ChS1 | 5.50 | 8/9 | FS | 2020 US Championships | Details |

- Unanimous +3 GOE marks from the judging panel highlighted in **bold**

Technical elements with maximum score at the U.S. Championships in the +3/-3 GOE system
| No. | Element | Score | +5s | Seg. | Event | Reference |
|---|---|---|---|---|---|---|
| 1 | Stsq4 | 6.00 | 8/9 | SP | 2018 Grand Prix Final | Details |
| 2 | Stsq4 | 6.00 | **9/9** | SP | 2018 US Championships | Details |

Program components with maximum score at the U.S. Championships
| No. | Component | Score | 10s | Seg. | Event | Reference |
|---|---|---|---|---|---|---|
| 1 | Performance | 10.00 | 8/9 | FS | 2019 US Championships | Details |

== Absolute best scores ==
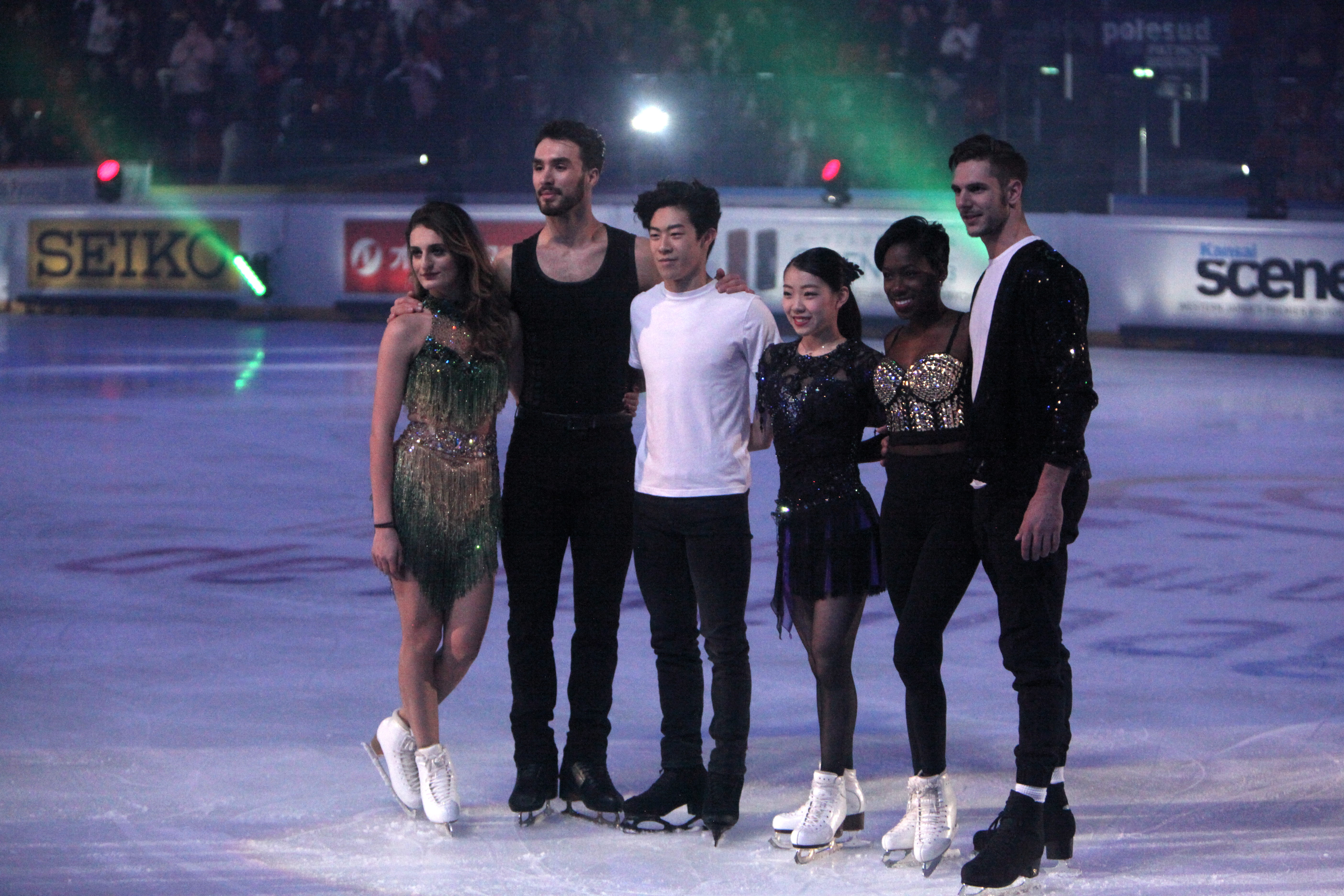
Chen (center left) with Gabriella Papadakis/Guillaume Cizeron (left), Rika Kihira (center right) and Vanessa James/Morgan Cipres (right) at 2018 Internationaux de France Exhibition

Chen has achieved combined total scores above 300 points seven times since the implementation of the +5/-5 system in the 2018–19 season, twice in the +3/-3 system season prior to that season.

Total scores above 300 points in the +5/-5 system
| No. | Score | Event |
|---|---|---|
| 1 | 323.42 | (Japan) 2019 World Championships |
| 2 | 301.44 | (Japan) 2019 World Team Trophy^{team} |
| 3 | 335.30 | (Italy) 2019 Grand Prix Final |
| 4 | 320.88 | (Sweden) 2021 World Championships |
| 5 | 312.89 | (Japan) 2021 World Team Trophy^{team} |
| 6 | 307.18 | 2021 Skate Canada International |
| 7 | 332.60 | (China) 2022 Winter Olympics |

Total scores above 300 points in the +3/-3 system
| No. | Score | Event |
|---|---|---|
| 1 | 307.46 | (South Korea) 2017 Four Continents Champs. |
| 2 | 321.40 | (Italy) 2018 World Championships |

Chen passed the 100 mark in the short program ten times since the 2018–19 season and five times in the historical system prior to that season.

Short program scores above 100 points in the +5/-5 system
| No. | Score | Event |
|---|---|---|
| 1 | 107.40 | (Japan) 2019 World Championships |
| 2 | 101.95 | (Japan) 2019 World Team Trophy ^{team} |
| 3 | 102.71 | (United States) 2019 Skate America |
| 4 | 102.48 | 2019 Internationaux de France |
| 5 | 110.38 | (Italy) 2019 Grand Prix Final |
| 6 | 111.17 | (United States) 2020 Skate America |
| 7 | 109.65 | (Japan) 2021 World Team Trophy^{team} |
| 8 | 106.72 | 2021 Skate Canada International |
| 9 | 111.71 | (China) 2022 Winter Olympics ^{team} |
| 10 | 113.97 | (China) 2022 Winter Olympics |

Short program scores above 100 points in the +3/-3 system
| No. | Score | Event |
|---|---|---|
| 1 | 103.12 | (South Korea) 2017 Four Continents Champs. . |
| 2 | 100.54 | (Russia) 2017 Rostelecom |
| 3 | 104.12 | (United States) 2018 Skate America |
| 4 | 103.32 | (Japan) 2017 Grand Prix Final |
| 5 | 101.94 | (Italy) 2018 World Championships |

Chen received more than 200 points for his free skate six times since the 2018–19 season, three times in the previous system.

Free skate scores above 200 points in the +5/-5 system
| No. | Score | Event |
|---|---|---|
| 1 | 216.02 | (Japan) 2019 World Championships |
| 2 | 224.92 | (Italy) 2019 Grand Prix Final |
| 3 | 222.03 | (Sweden) 2021 World Championships |
| 4 | 203.24 | (Japan) 2021 World Team Trophy^{team} |
| 5 | 200.46 | 2021 Skate Canada International |
| 6 | 218.63 | (China) 2022 Winter Olympics |

Free skate scores above 200 points in the +3/-3 system
| No. | Score | Event |
|---|---|---|
| 1 | 204.34 | (South Korea) 2017 Four Continents Championships |
| 2 | 215.08 | (South Korea) 2018 Winter Olympics |
| 3 | 219.46 | (Italy) 2018 World Championships |

== Detailed results ==
=== Senior level in +5/-5 GOE system ===
- Small medals for the short program and free skating are only awarded at ISU Championships.
- Medals at team events are awarded for the team results only. Individual placements at team events are listed in parentheses.

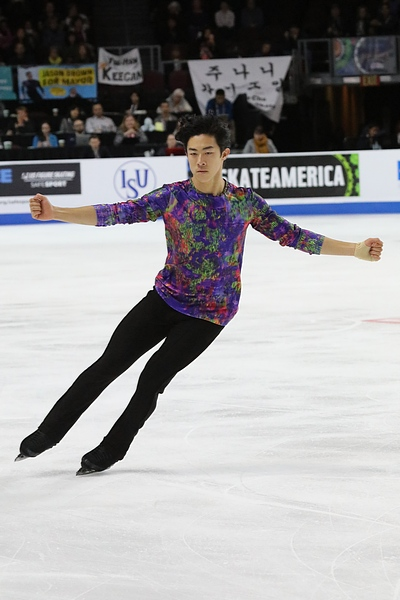
Chen during his free skate at the 2019 Skate America

Results in the 2018–19 season
| Date | Event | SP | | FS | | Total | | Details |
| Date | Event | P | Score | P | Score | P | Score | Details |
|---|---|---|---|---|---|---|---|---|
| Oct 6, 2018 | 2018 Japan Open | – | – | 4 | 144.96 | 3 | – | Details |
| Oct 19–21, 2018 | (United States) 2018 Skate America | 1 | 90.58 | 1 | 189.99 | 1 | 280.57 | Details |
| Nov 23–25, 2018 | 2018 Internationaux de France | 3 | 86.94 | 1 | 184.64 | 1 | 271.58 | Details |
| Dec 6–9, 2018 | (Canada) 2018–19 Grand Prix Final | 1 | 92.99 | 1 | 189.43 | 1 | 282.42 | Details |
| Jan 19–27, 2019 | (United States) 2019 U.S. Championships | 1 | 113.42 | 1 | 228.80 | 1 | 342.22 | Details |
| Mar 18–24, 2019 | (Japan) 2019 World Championships | 1 | 107.40 | 1 | 216.02 | 1 | 323.42 | Details |
| Apr 11–14, 2019 | (Japan) 2019 World Team Trophy | 1 | 101.95 | 1 | 199.49 | 1 (1) | 301.44 | Details |

Results in the 2019–20 season
| Date | Event | SP | | FS | | Total | | Details |
| Date | Event | P | Score | P | Score | P | Score | Details |
|---|---|---|---|---|---|---|---|---|
| Oct 5, 2019 | 2019 Japan Open | – | – | 1 | 189.83 | 3 | – | Details |
| Oct 18–20, 2019 | (United States) 2019 Skate America | 1 | 102.71 | 1 | 196.38 | 1 | 299.09 | Details |
| Nov 1–3, 2019 | 2019 Internationaux de France | 1 | 102.48 | 1 | 194.68 | 1 | 297.16 | Details |
| Dec 5–8, 2019 | (Italy) 2019–20 Grand Prix Final | 1 | 110.38 | 1 | 224.92 | 1 | 335.30 | Details |
| Jan 20–26, 2020 | (United States) 2020 U.S. Championships | 1 | 114.13 | 1 | 216.04 | 1 | 330.17 | Details |

Results in the 2020–21 season
| Date | Event | SP | | FS | | Total | | Details |
| Date | Event | P | Score | P | Score | P | Score | Details |
|---|---|---|---|---|---|---|---|---|
| Oct 23–24, 2020 | (United States) 2020 Skate America | 1 | 111.17 | 1 | 187.98 | 1 | 299.15 | Details |
| Jan 9–21, 2021 | (United States) 2021 U.S. Championships | 1 | 113.92 | 1 | 208.36 | 1 | 322.28 | Details |
| Mar 22–28, 2021 | (Sweden) 2021 World Championships | 3 | 98.85 | 1 | 222.03 | 1 | 320.88 | Details |
| Apr 15–18, 2021 | (Japan) 2021 World Team Trophy | 1 | 109.65 | 1 | 203.24 | 2 (1) | 312.89 | Details |

Results in the 2021–22 season
| Date | Event | SP | | FS | | Total | | Details |
| Date | Event | P | Score | P | Score | P | Score | Details |
|---|---|---|---|---|---|---|---|---|
| Oct 22–24, 2021 | (United States) 2021 Skate America | 4 | 82.89 | 2 | 186.48 | 3 | 269.37 | Details |
| Oct 29–31, 2021 | 2021 Skate Canada International | 1 | 106.72 | 1 | 200.46 | 1 | 307.18 | Details |
| Jan 3–9, 2022 | (United States) 2022 U.S. Championships | 1 | 115.39 | 1 | 212.62 | 1 | 328.01 | Details |
| Feb 4–7, 2022 | (China) 2022 Winter Olympics (Team event) | 1 | 111.71 | – | – | 1 | – | Details |
| Feb 8–10, 2022 | (China) 2022 Winter Olympics | 1 | 113.97 | 1 | 218.63 | 1 | 332.60 | Details |

=== Senior level in +3/-3 GOE system ===
- Small medals for the short program and free skating are only awarded at ISU Championships.
- Medals at team events are awarded for the team results only. Individual placements at team events are listed in parentheses.

Results in the 2016–17 season
| Date | Event | SP | | FS | | Total | | Details |
| Date | Event | P | Score | P | Score | P | Score | Details |
|---|---|---|---|---|---|---|---|---|
| Oct 6–10, 2016 | (Finland) 2016 CS Finlandia Trophy | 2 | 87.50 | 1 | 168.94 | 1 | 256.44 | Details |
| Nov 11–13, 2016 | 2016 Trophée de France | 2 | 92.85 | 4 | 171.95 | 4 | 264.80 | Details |
| Nov 25–27, 2016 | (Japan) 2016 NHK Trophy | 2 | 87.94 | 2 | 180.97 | 2 | 268.91 | Details |
| Dec 8–11, 2016 | (France) 2016–17 Grand Prix Final | 5 | 85.30 | 1 | 197.55 | 2 | 282.85 | Details |
| Jan 14–22, 2017 | (United States) 2017 U.S. Championships | 1 | 106.39 | 1 | 212.08 | 1 | 318.47 | Details |
| Feb 14–19, 2017 | (South Korea) 2017 Four Continents Championships | 1 | 103.12 | 2 | 204.34 | 1 | 307.46 | Details |
| Mar 29 – Apr 2, 2017 | (Finland) 2017 World Championships | 6 | 97.33 | 4 | 193.39 | 6 | 290.72 | Details |
| Apr 20–23, 2017 | (Japan) 2017 World Team Trophy | 2 | 99.28 | 4 | 185.24 | 3 (3) | 284.52 | Details |

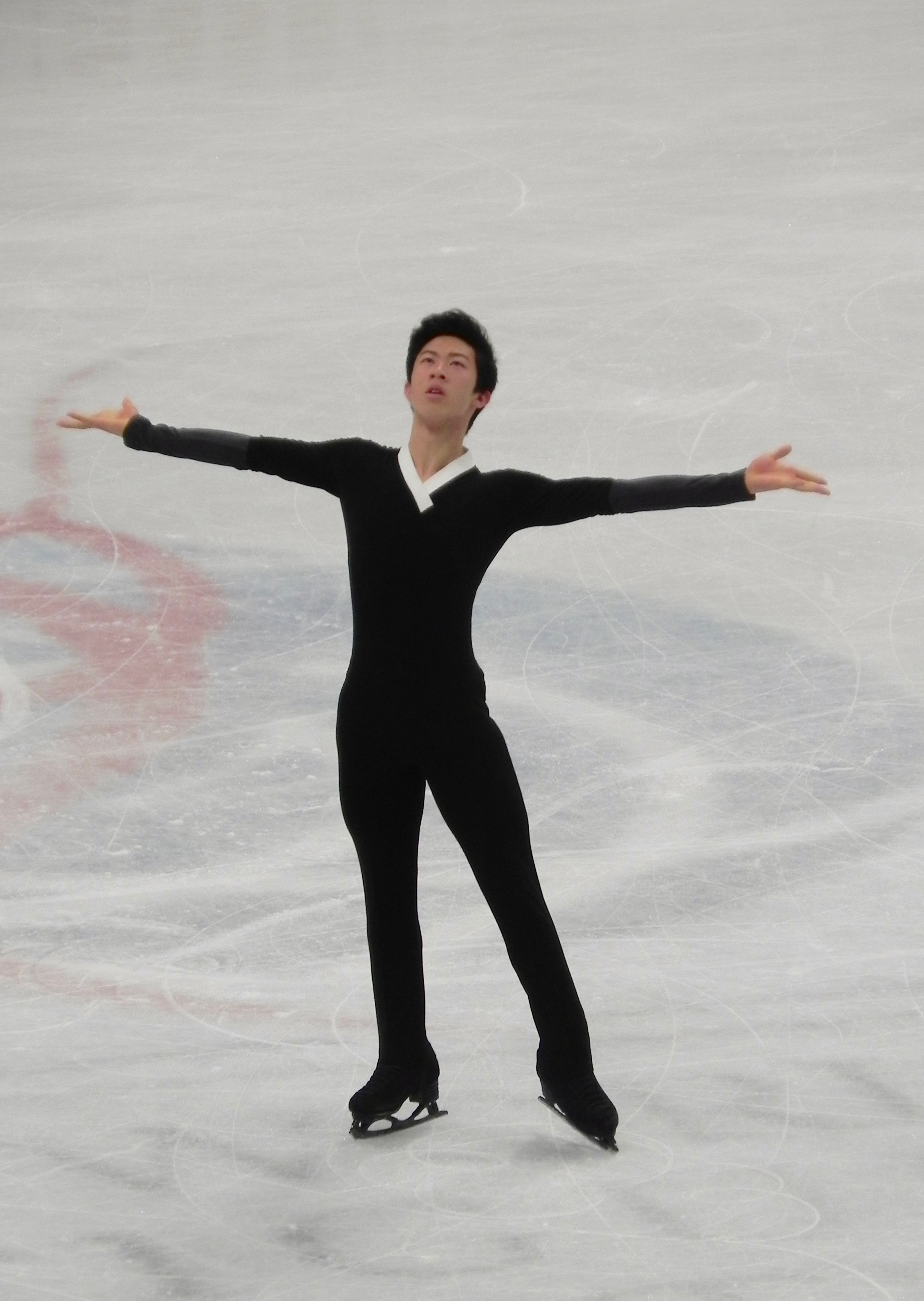
Chen in his free skate at the 2018 World Championships

Results in the 2017–18 season
| Date | Event | SP | | FS | | Total | | Details |
| Date | Event | P | Score | P | Score | P | Score | Details |
|---|---|---|---|---|---|---|---|---|
| Sep 13–17, 2017 | (United States) 2017 CS U.S. International Classic | 1 | 91.80 | 1 | 183.24 | 1 | 275.04 | Details |
| Oct 7, 2017 | 2017 Japan Open | – | – | 2 | 178.46 | 3 | – | Details |
| Oct 20–22, 2017 | (Russia) 2017 Rostelecom Cup | 1 | 100.54 | 2 | 193.25 | 1 | 293.79 | Details |
| Nov 24–26, 2017 | (United States) 2017 Skate America | 1 | 104.12 | 2 | 171.76 | 1 | 275.88 | Details |
| Dec 7–10, 2017 | (Japan) 2017–18 Grand Prix Final | 1 | 103.32 | 2 | 183.19 | 1 | 286.51 | Details |
| Dec 29 – Jan 8, 2018 | (United States) 2018 U.S. Championships | 1 | 104.45 | 1 | 210.78 | 1 | 315.23 | Details |
| Feb 9–12, 2018 | (South Korea) 2018 Winter Olympics (Team event) | 4 | 80.61 | – | – | 3 | – | Details |
| Feb 14–23, 2018 | (South Korea) 2018 Winter Olympics | 17 | 82.27 | 1 | 215.08 | 5 | 297.35 | Details |
| Mar 19–25, 2018 | (Italy) 2018 World Championships | 1 | 101.94 | 1 | 219.46 | 1 | 321.40 | Details |

=== Junior level in +3/-3 GOE system ===
- S – senior level
- Small medals for the short program and free skating are only awarded at ISU Championships.

Results in the 2011–12 season
| Date | Event | SP | | FS | | Total | | Details |
| Date | Event | P | Score | P | Score | P | Score | Details |
|---|---|---|---|---|---|---|---|---|
| Jan 22–29, 2012 | (United States) 2012 U.S. Championships | 2 | 63.15 | 1 | 130.75 | 1 | 193.90 | Details |

Results in the 2012–13 season
| Date | Event | SP | | FS | | Total | | Details |
| Date | Event | P | Score | P | Score | P | Score | Details |
|---|---|---|---|---|---|---|---|---|
| Sep 13–14, 2012 | 2012 JGP Austria | 1 | 75.15 | 1 | 146.85 | 1 | 222.00 | Details |
| Jan 19–27, 2013 | (United States) 2013 U.S. Championships | 3 | 63.60 | 4 | 117.71 | 3 | 181.31 | Details |

Results in the 2013–14 season
| Date | Event | SP | | FS | | Total | | Details |
| Date | Event | P | Score | P | Score | P | Score | Details |
|---|---|---|---|---|---|---|---|---|
| Sep 4–8, 2013 | 2013 JGP Mexico | 1 | 74.22 | 1 | 144.40 | 1 | 218.62 | Details |
| Sep 25–28, 2013 | 2013 JGP Belarus | 1 | 69.96 | 1 | 141.15 | 1 | 211.11 | Details |
| Dec 5–8, 2013 | (Japan) 2013 Junior Grand Prix Final | 3 | 71.52 | 3 | 143.09 | 3 | 214.61 | Details |
| Jan 5–12, 2014 | (United States) 2014 U.S. Championships | 1 | 79.61 | 1 | 144.32 | 1 | 223.93 | Details |
| Mar 10–16, 2014 | (Bulgaria) 2014 World Junior Championships | 6 | 69.65 | 3 | 142.38 | 3 | 212.03 | Details |

Results in the 2014–15 season
| Date | Event | SP | | FS | | Total | | Details |
| Date | Event | P | Score | P | Score | P | Score | Details |
|---|---|---|---|---|---|---|---|---|
| Oct 9–10, 2014 | 2014 JGP Croatia | 2 | 72.57 | 2 | 135.59 | 2 | 208.16 | Details |
| Jan 17–25, 2015 | (United States) 2015 U.S. Championships (S) | 8 | 76.20 | 8 | 154.79 | 8 | 230.99 | Details |
| Mar 2–8, 2015 | (Estonia) 2015 World Junior Championships | 9 | 69.87 | 4 | 143.98 | 4 | 213.85 | Details |

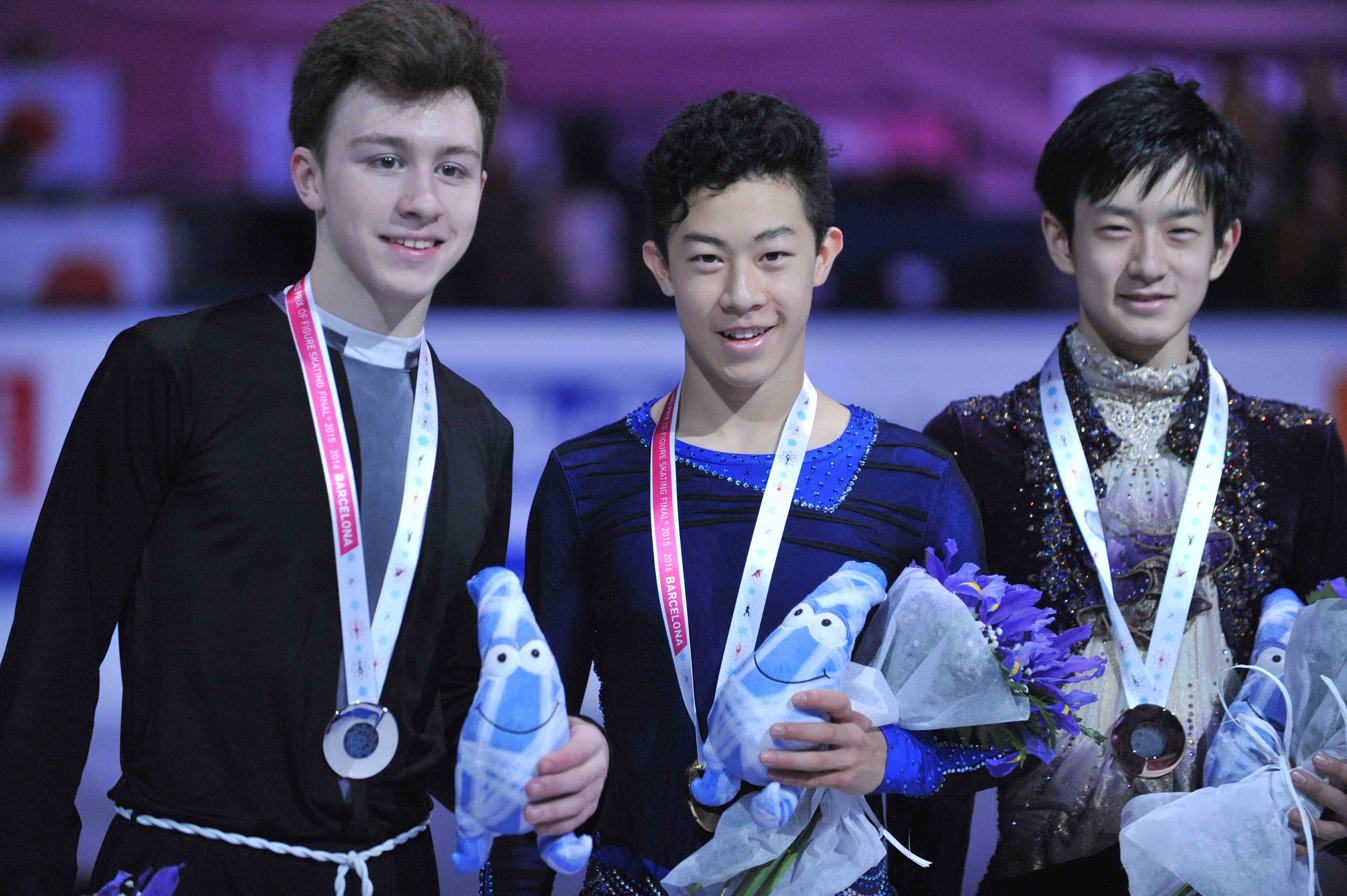
Chen with Dmitri Aliev (left), Sōta Yamamoto (right) at the 2015 JGP Final podium

Results in the 2015–16 season
| Date | Event | SP | | FS | | Total | | Details |
| Date | Event | P | Score | P | Score | P | Score | Details |
|---|---|---|---|---|---|---|---|---|
| Sep 2–5, 2015 | 2015 JGP United States | 1 | 77.13 | 1 | 159.63 | 1 | 236.76 | Details |
| Sep 30 – Oct 3, 2015 | 2015 JGP Spain | 1 | 77.94 | 2 | 158.43 | 1 | 236.37 | Details |
| Dec 9–13, 2015 | (Spain) 2015 Junior Grand Prix Final | 1 | 78.59 | 2 | 146.45 | 1 | 225.04 | Details |
| Jan 16–24, 2016 | (United States) 2016 U.S. Senior Championships (S) | 4 | 86.33 | 2 | 180.60 | 3 | 266.93 | Details |
