= Work Bitch =

2013 single by Britney Spears

Single by Britney Spears

from the album Britney Jean
- Released: September 16, 2013
- Recorded: May 2013
- Studio: KBK (Stockholm); Glenwood Place (Burbank)
- Genre: EDM
- Length: 4:07
- Label: RCA
- Songwriters: William Adams; Otto Jettman; Sebastian Ingrosso; Anthony Preston; Ruth-Anne Cunningham; Britney Spears
- Producers: Sebastian Ingrosso; Otto Knows; will.i.am

Britney Spears singles chronology
"Ooh La La" (2013)	"Work Bitch" (2013)	"Perfume" (2013)

Music video
- "Work Bitch" on YouTube

"Work Bitch" (edited for radio as "Work Work") is a song recorded by American singer Britney Spears for her eighth studio album Britney Jean (2013). It was written by Spears, will.i.am, Otto Knows, Sebastian Ingrosso, Anthony Preston and Ruth-Anne Cunningham. The song's production was handled by Ingrosso, Jettman and Adams, while vocal production was done by Adams and Preston. "Work Bitch" made its premiere on September 15, 2013, on iHeartRadio and select Clear Channel radio stations and was released as the lead single from Britney Jean the following day, by RCA Records.

"Work Bitch" is an EDM song containing mostly spoken lyrics, where Spears repeatedly exhorts "bitches" to "get to work". "Work Bitch" garnered critical acclaim, with praise drawn towards its production and female empowerment lyrics. It received several certifications from multiple countries. "Work Bitch" debuted and peaked at number 12 on the Billboard Hot 100. Outside of the United States, "Work Bitch" peaked within the top ten of the charts in 14 countries, including Canada, France, Spain and the United Kingdom.

An accompanying music video for "Work Bitch" was directed by Ben Mor and filmed in Malibu, California, and released in October 2013. It is one of the most expensive music videos of all time and has generated acclaim from critics, who praised Spears' dancing and the visual cinematography.

== Background and release ==
Previously, in 2012, Spears and will.i.am collaborated on the song "Scream & Shout"; will.i.am was later announced in March 2013 as the executive producer for Spears' eighth studio album. In preparation for the single and album, Spears began working with a vocal coach and choreographer collaboratively. "Work Bitch" was confirmed by Spears on September 7, 2013, during the video's filming. On August 20, 2013, Spears' official website launched a countdown titled "All Eyes on Me" counting down to September 17, 2013, which lead fans to speculate that this was, in fact, the single title. In response, Spears told fans that new music was coming "much sooner than you think".

On September 10, 2013; Spears confirmed "Work Bitch"'s worldwide radio premiere for September 16, 2013, at 6 p.m. ET on her official Twitter account, following up with a second tweet, "Work Bitch will be available on @iTunesMusic that night at 12:01am ET, Sept 17th... are u ready?! #YouBettaWorkB #1Week". On September 11, Spears revealed the writers of the song. The next day, Spears revealed the official single cover. The artwork features her posing in front of a vanity mirror, wearing a bedazzled leotard complete with feathered shoulders. A small sign can be seen behind her reading "Welcome to Fabulous Las Vegas", referencing her Las Vegas residency. The song leaked in full on September 15, 2013, one day before it was due for release on iHeartRadio and was therefore premiered a day earlier than scheduled. A clean version of the song, titled "Work Work" has also been released. A CD single of the song was released in Germany on October 18, 2013.

== Composition ==
"Work Bitch"
A 23-second sample of the song, where Spears sings over an EDM-influenced strong club beat. Critics noted that it "features mostly spoken lyrics, [and] serves as a testament to the fine things a strong work ethic can bring about".

"Work Bitch" was written by Spears with will.i.am and Anthony Preston, and features a beat from DJ Otto Knows. Knows is managed by Swedish House Mafia member Sebastian Ingrosso, who also received a songwriting credit; however, Ingrosso revealed he did not write the lyrics. "Work Bitch" is an EDM song written in common time in the key of E minor, at a tempo of 128 beats per minute, wherein Spears, repeatedly exhorts "bitches" to "get to work". It starts with a basic club beat, with a monotone taunting chorus: "You want a hot body? / You want a Bugatti? / You want a Maserati? / You better work bitch!" Spears alludes to the luxuries she has attained due to her strong work ethic: "You want a Lamborghini? / Sip martinis? / Look hot in a bikini? / You better work bitch!" and "You wanna live fancy? / Live in a big mansion? / Party in France?"

According to Miriam Coleman of Rolling Stone, it "features mostly spoken lyrics, [and] serves as a testament to the fine things a strong work ethic can bring about". Idolator contributor Christina Lee thought that the song "sounds like the lights-out after-party" to RuPaul's 1993 debut single "Supermodel (You Better Work)". will.i.am commented that the song "is a reflection of Britney moreso than [Britney Jean]. The album is what the album is, but we felt that song needed to come out to keep the foundation on what Britney represents. But it shouldn't reflect the album—an album is a body of work as a collective. If we had to pick a song like, 'Oh, what song fits every color of the record,' you shouldn't do that… We felt that song represents 'Piece of Me', that Britney oomph." Some critics noted Spears's apparent British accent in her performance, with Billboard writing: "Britney utilizes a British accent on “Work Bitch.” This is an okay thing!"

== Critical response ==
A writer for Billboard described the track as a "full-on club banger with Spears giving fans the secret to her success". Writing for MuuMuse, Bradley Stern complimented the song as a "thrilling, thunderously bold slice of forward-thinking dance-pop". A reviewer for Popjustice called the track "amazing", and suggested that the lyrical content "has the right attitude for a Blackout 2.0 sort of album". Michael Cragg from The Guardian felt that "Work Bitch" is a "pretty relentless onslaught that reflects pop's current love for chucking in everything up to and including the kitchen sink", but felt that Spears' personality "[made] sure she hasn't been fully obliterated by will.i.am's production sledgehammer". Chris Eggertsen from HitFix called that it was a "perfect club track", but questioned how it would perform on mainstream radio. However, Sal Cinquemani from Slant Magazine gave a negative review for the song, opining that it "follows the current EDM model of painfully aggressive, treble-heavy beats, harsh synths, and tuneless hooks, but makes even 'Scream & Shout' sound like a melodic feast". Caryb Ganz of Rolling Stone noted that "will.i.am draws up the perfect nü-Britney blueprint: a squelchy thumper that's light on singing and heavy on hilarious directives barked in an English accent... Blasts of clubby synths do most of the work, while Britney winks at the world". About.com writer Bill Lamb called the single forward thinking and gave the single praise, stating, "This is a single that is pushing boundaries and will likely feel more exhilarating each time you listen".

== Commercial performance ==
The song debuted on the Billboard Hot 100 at number 12, marking Spears' 31st song on the chart and the fifth highest debut of her career on the chart, and her seventh in the top 20. It also marked Spears' 19th top 20 single and overall her 23rd top 40 single. It also entered the top 10 on the Hot Digital Songs chart at number six. "Work Bitch" sold 174,000 copies in its first week, marking Spears' highest first-week sales since her 2011 number-one single "Hold It Against Me". With its debut on the Mainstream Top 40 at number 25, the song marks Spears' 31st chart entry, pushing her past Mariah Carey (30) for the second-most entries to the chart's October 3, 1992, launch. In its second week, the song fell to number 41 on the Billboard Hot 100. The following week, it climbed back to number 13 after the release of the accompanying music video. As of July 2016, "Work Bitch" has sold 967,000 copies in the United States.

In the United Kingdom, "Work Bitch" debuted and peaked at number seven on the UK Singles Chart on November 10, 2013 – for the week ending date November 16, 2013 – falling 30 places to number 37 the following week. The song also peaked at number two on the UK Dance Chart.

== Accolades ==
Listicles
Year	Award	Category	Result	Ref.
2014	PopCrush Fan Choice Award	Song of the Year	Nominated	
2014	PopCrush Fan Choice Award	Video of the Year	Nominated	
2014	World Music Awards	World’s Best Song	Nominated	
2014	World Music Awards	World’s Best Video	Nominated	

Listicles
Publication	Accolade	Rank	Ref.
DigitalDreamDoor	100 Greatest Songs From 2013	88th	
Rolling Stone	100 Best Songs Of 2013	46th	

== Music video ==
=== Development ===
"A lot of sex goes into what I do. But sometimes I would like to bring it back to the old days when there was like one outfit through the whole video, and you're dancing the whole video, and there's like not that much sex stuff going on. It's about the dance and it's about being old school, it's like keeping it real and just making it about the dance. I'd love to do a video like that"

— Spears discussing her creative control over the music video.

The music video for "Work Bitch" was shot by Ben Mor, who had previously worked on the video for Spears and will.i.am's 2012 single, "Scream & Shout". The visual effects for the music video were provided by HOAX Films, who completed sky replacements shots, set extensions and cleanup. It is produced for Black Dog Films/Little Minx, executive producer Coleen Haynes and producer Tony McGarry. Spears revealed she was rehearsing for something "top secret next week", on August 29. Filming took place in Malibu, California and at around Lake Powell/Antelope Canyon in Arizona/Utah, on September 7, 8, 9 and 10. On the first day, Spears tweeted, "Hot day on set... ;) A little dirty, little flirty, danced my ASS off. Stoked for tomorrow!" following the tweet up with a still of herself in a yellow and black bra with long, black gloves. Spears released a sneak peek of the video on September 26, 2013, through her Instagram account. The full version of the music video premiered on October 1 on The CW Television Network, during the second day broadcast of the iHeartRadio Music Festival.

Spears revealed that the video was supposed to have more sexual scenes; however, she edited many scenes out "because I am a mother and because, you know, I have children, and it's just hard to play sexy mom while you're being a pop star as well. I just have to be true to myself and you know, feel it out when I do stuff." Mor replied to the singer's comment, saying he never forced or made her do anything she didn't want to during the shoot, and continued, "she's in complete control the whole time. It was easy to make a racier cut only because of the extras and the cutaways, and that's it". Spears manager Larry Rudolph and father Jamie Spears also released a statement, revealing that "Britney is never pressured into anything. She reviews all creative and for her 'Work Bitch' video she discussed toning down some parts in finding a balance of sexy and being a mom." The original airing of the premiere in the United States was viewed by 1.09 million viewers and received a Nielsen rating of 0.4/1 in the key adults 18–49 demographic, up 33 percent from the previous night.

==== Production costs ====
Planet Hollywood reported that the music video's total production and editing costs amounted to $6.5 million, as stipulated by the contract Spears signed in her residency requirements, which may have made it the second-most-expensive music video of all time. Upon the reporting, director Ben Mor refuted all claims on the production costs.

=== Synopsis ===
A scene of the video where Spears portrays a dominatrix, and channels the erotic romance novel Fifty Shades of Grey. Music video networks in the United Kingdom were prohibited from airing the video before 10 p.m., for displaying bondage-esque scenes.

Mor said the video is not story-based as Spears' previous videos, but it has "more of a theme ... rather than a narrative. This one is basically [saying] 'The queen is back and she's about to show all these bitches how it's done.' It's her being really fierce and taking back her throne in a way." The video opens with several intercalated shots of the singer, who portrays a dominatrix, and her dancers in front of a pool, a car, and in the middle of the desert. Spears is seen at the top of Planet Hollywood Resort and Casino dancing. Bruna Nessif of E! Online compared the video to the erotic romance novel Fifty Shades of Grey, mentioning the singer "whipping some woman ... and using a riding crop". Product placement for Spears' fragrance Fantasy and Beats Pill wireless speakers (being used as a bit gag) can also be seen.

=== Reception ===
Bruna Nessif of E! Online praised the singer's figure, saying the video is "everything Britney Spears fans could want and more", adding, "There is just so much going on, we don't even know where to start! But how about Brit's bangin' body? Yes, let's start there." Mike Wass of Idolator compared the desert scenes to the ones of Ciara's "Got Me Good" (2012), and wrote, "not only does [Spears] look absolutely gorgeous in an array of skimpy outfits, there's some life in her eyes and, dare I say it, a spring in her step". The Hollywood Reporter contributor Sophie Schillaci thought the video was a return to Spears' early 2000s, comparing it to "I'm a Slave 4 U" (2001) and "My Prerogative" (2004). A reviewer for Fuse called the video a "sleek and sexy" return to form, while Ryan Roschke of PopSugar commented that "even though the premise of the video is a little unclear, we're going to go ahead and give Brit an 'A' for 'Abs.'" Similarly, Sharnaz Shahid of Entertainment Wise thought "the pop princess oozes sex appeal" and "is back to her old provocative ways".

Jocelyn Vena of MTV felt Mor "wasn't lying" when he said the video would show a more adult side of Spears, and argued the clip proves the singer is "ready for her next era to launch". Samantha Highfill from Entertainment Weekly described the video as a prequel to Beyoncé's "Run the World (Girls)", saying that it had similar desert setting, "sexy" clothes, wavy hair, wild animals and both are all-female dance numbers. She further viewed Spears' video as "offensive to women" but concluded that "However, the more I thought about the songs and watched the videos, the more I realized that even though Beyoncé's song is all about the power of women, Britney's is too. Sure, Britney is a little more blunt in finding a way to, er, 'encourage' women to work hard, but the song is about the fact that women can and should work hard and find success." A mixed review came from HitFix's Melinda Newman, who wasn't too impressed with the production, noting, however, that Spears' "dancing has certainly improved" and that "it's clear that she's definitely doing so much better than she was just a few years ago". In the United Kingdom, the music video was banned from airing on music video networks before 10 pm, for displaying "a number of risqué scenes featuring bondage gear and Spears whipping her dancers". The country's MTV and The Box networks requested a clean edit of the video to air through the day, as a heavily censored version of the song titled "Work" is also available. This music video was Vevo certified on March 16, 2014, becoming Spears' fourth Vevo certified clip.

== Live performances ==
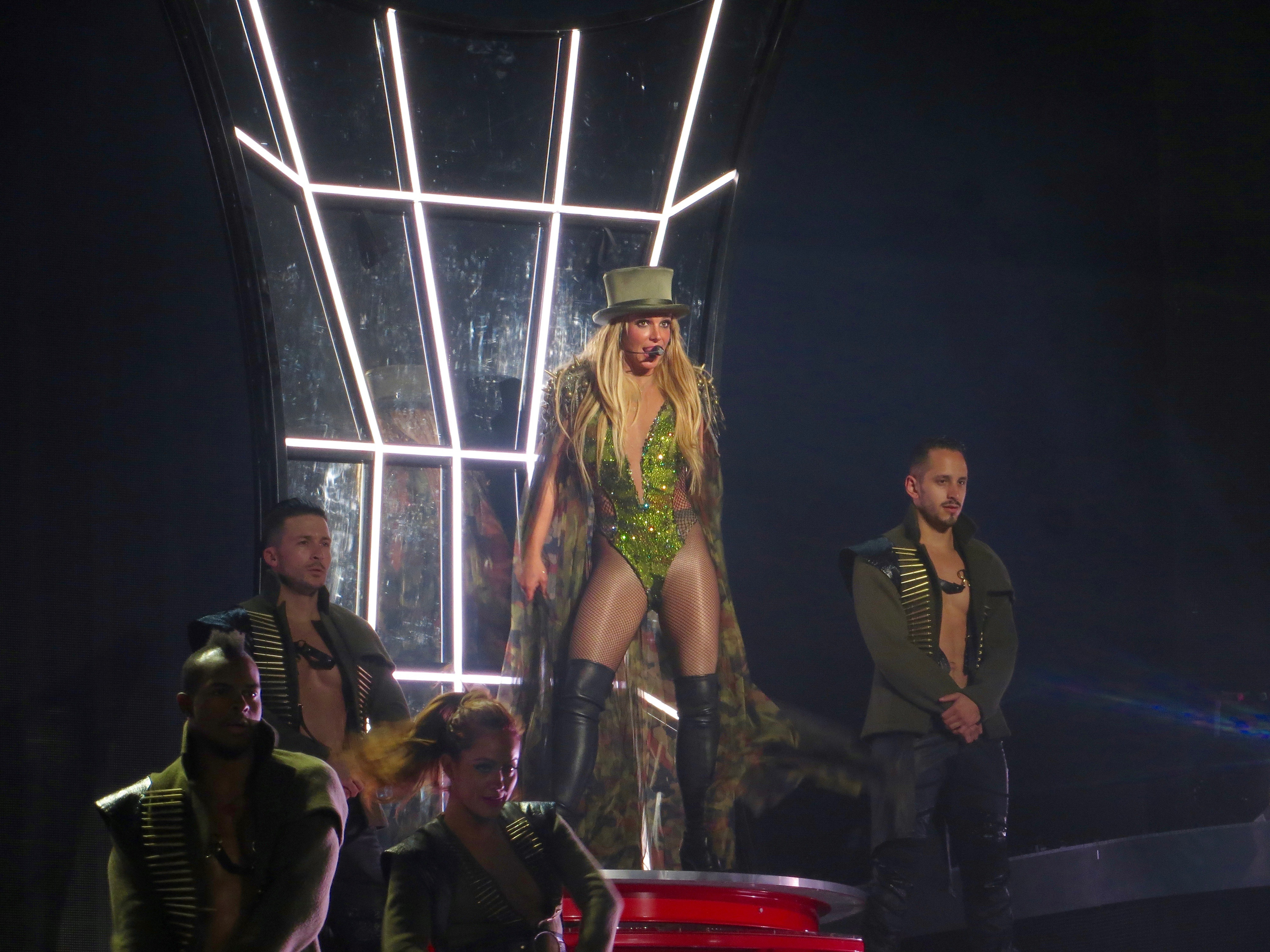
Spears opening the Britney: Piece of Me show with a performance of "Work Bitch"

Spears performed "Work Bitch" as the opening act of her Las Vegas residency, Britney: Piece of Me (2013–17). The performance begins with the singer "descending from the sky in a globe-like cage". After exiting the cage, she performs the choreography from the music video, accompanied by 16 alien-masked dancers. Spears sports a "skin-tight, sequined bodysuit" for the performance, similar to the diamond outfit she wore during the "Toxic" music video (2004). Keith Caulfield of Billboard said "Spears was particularly energetic in the number, which seemed to delight the crowd". Caryn Ganz of Rolling Stone considered it the best moment of the concert, noting that "Spears stomped around the stage with authority and nailed her choreography, setting a hopeful tone for the night". On May 22, 2016, Spears performed the song in a medley of her greatest hits at the 2016 Billboard Music Awards. It was also the opening number at Spears's set on the iHeartRadio Music Festival on September 24, and on the 2016 Apple Music Festival on September 27, 2016. The song was also streamed live along with "Toxic" from Spears' final Britney: Piece of Me show date on December 31, 2017, on ABC's Dick Clark's New Year's Rockin' Eve to an audience of 25.6 million.

On October 14, 2013, Nicole "Snooki" Polizzi and her dance partner Sasha Farber performed "Work Bitch" on the season 17 of Dancing with the Stars. Polizzi explained that the performance was "a celebration of me being a mother, a woman, a new person, and working seven days a week to provide a great life for my family".

== Track listings ==
- CD single
1. "Work Bitch" – 4:07
2. "Work Bitch" (Instrumental) – 4:07
- Digital download
1. "Work Bitch" – 4:07
- Clean digital download
1. "Work Work" – 4:07

== Credits and personnel ==
Credits adapted from the liner notes of the "Work Bitch" CD single.

Recording

- Recorded and engineered at KBK Studios, Stockholm, Sweden
- Mixed at Record Plant, Los Angeles, California, U.S.
- Vocals recorded and engineered at Glenwood Studio, Burbank, California, U.S.

Personnel

- Britney Spears – lead vocals and backing vocals, songwriter
- will.i.am – songwriter, executive producer, producer, vocal producer, guest vocals and backing vocals
- Otto Knows – songwriter, producer, instrumentation, programming, recording, engineer
- Sebastian Ingrosso – songwriter, producer, instrumentation, programming, recording, engineer
- Anthony Preston – songwriter, vocal producer, backing vocals
- Ruth-Anne Cunningham – songwriter
- Myah Marie – backing vocals
- Joe Peluso – mixer
- Julian Prindle – vocal recording, vocal engineer
- Jacob Dennis – assistant vocal engineer
- Chris Kahn – assistant vocal engineer

== Charts ==
=== Weekly charts ===
2013–2014 weekly chart performance
Chart	Peak position
Australia (ARIA)	22
Austria (Ö3 Austria Top 40)	37
Belgium (Ultratop 50 Flanders)	14
Belgium (Ultratop 50 Wallonia)	11
Canada Hot 100 (Billboard)	5
Canada CHR/Top 40 (Billboard)	9
Canada Hot AC (Billboard)	23
CIS Airplay (TopHit)	16
Colombia (National-Report)	60
Czech Republic Airplay (ČNS IFPI)	17
Denmark (Tracklisten)	17
Euro Digital Song Sales (Billboard)	19
Finland Airplay (Radiosoittolista)	24
Finland Download (Latauslista)	9
France (SNEP)	6
Germany (GfK)	36
Greece Digital Songs (Billboard)	3
Hungary (Dance Top 40)	12
Hungary (Single Top 40)	12
Ireland (IRMA)	13
Italy (FIMI)	6
Japan (Billboard Japan Hot 100)	25
Lebanon (Lebanese Top 20)	9
Mexico (Billboard Ingles Airplay)	3
Mexico Anglo (Monitor Latino)	5
Netherlands (Dutch Top 40 Tipparade)	2
Netherlands (Single Top 100)	45
New Zealand (Recorded Music NZ)	28
Norway Digital Songs (Billboard)	10
Poland Dance (ZPAV)	32
Russia Airplay (TopHit)	14
Scottish Singles Sales (Official Charts)	7
Slovakia Airplay (ČNS IFPI)	26
South Korea International Singles (Gaon)	3
Spain (Promusicae)	8
Sweden (Sverigetopplistan)	30
Switzerland (Schweizer Hitparade)	25
Ukraine Airplay (TopHit)	48
UK Singles (Official Charts)	7
UK Dance (Official Charts)	2
US Billboard Hot 100	12
US Dance Club Songs (Billboard)	2
US Hot Dance/Electronic Songs (Billboard)	4
US Pop Airplay (Billboard)	14
US Rhythmic Airplay (Billboard)	30
Venezuela (Record Report)	81
Venezuela Pop Rock General (Record Report)	2

=== Year-end charts ===
2013 year-end chart performance
Chart	Position
Belgium (Ultratop 50 Wallonia)	94
Belgium Dance (Ultratop 50 Wallonia)	34
Canada (Canadian Hot 100)	89
CIS (TopHit)	120
France (SNEP)	95
Hungary (Dance Top 40)	75
Russia Airplay (TopHit)	168
US Hot Dance/Electronic Songs (Billboard)	17

2014 year-end chart performance
Chart	Position
Hungary (Dance Top 40)	63
US Hot Dance/Electronic Songs (Billboard)	26

== Certifications ==
Certifications and sales
Region	Certification	Certified units/sales
Australia (ARIA)	Gold	35,000^{^}
Canada (Music Canada)	Platinum	80,000^{*}
Denmark (IFPI Danmark)	Gold	900,000^{†}
France	—	34,200
Italy (FIMI)	Gold	15,000^{*}
Mexico (AMPROFON)	Gold	30,000^{*}
New Zealand (RMNZ)	Platinum	30,000^{‡}
South Korea (Gaon)	—	43,788
Sweden (GLF)	Platinum	40,000^{‡}
United Kingdom (BPI)	Gold	400,000^{‡}
United States (RIAA)	2× Platinum	2,000,000^{‡}
^{*} Sales figures based on certification alone.^{^} Shipments figures based on certification alone.^{‡} Sales+streaming figures based on certification alone.^{†} Streaming-only figures based on certification alone.

== Release history ==
Release dates and formats
Region	Date	Format(s)	Version(s)	Label(s)	Ref.
Various	September 16, 2013	Digital download	Original	RCA	(Note: attributed to digital platforms in France, Germany, Italy, New Zealand, and Spain)
Italy	September 16, 2013	Contemporary hit radio	Original	Sony	
United States	September 17, 2013	Digital download	Original	RCA	
United States	September 24, 2013	Contemporary hit radio; rhythmic contemporary radio	Original	RCA	
Various	September 27, 2013	Digital download	Clean	RCA	
Germany	October 18, 2013	CD	Original	Sony	
United Kingdom	November 3, 2013	Digital download	Original	RCA	

== See also ==
- List of most expensive music videos
