= Otto Knows =

Swedish DJ and producer (born 1989)

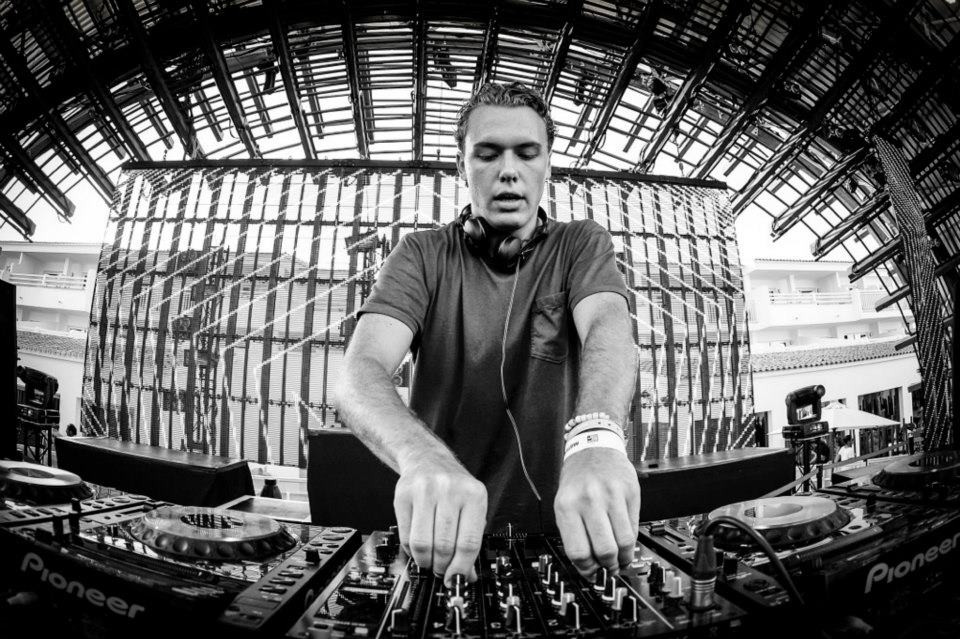

Background information
- Born: Otto Jettman; 6 May 1989 (age 37); Stockholm, Sweden
- Genres: Electro house; house; progressive house
- Occupations: DJ; music producer; remixer
- Years active: 2010–present
- Label: Refune

Otto Jettman (born 6 May 1989), better known by his stage name Otto Knows, is a Swedish DJ, producer and remixer who has had a number of hits in Sweden, Belgium and the Netherlands and has collaborated with artists including Britney Spears, Avicii, Sebastian Ingrosso, Alesso and has made remixes for ATB, Imogen Heap, Lindsey Stirling and others. He is best known for his songs like "Starlight (Otto Knows Remix)", "Parachute", "Next to Me", "Dying for You" and "Million Voices".

Jettman met Sebastian Ingrosso in Stockholm and soon after joined Ingrosso's Refune, touring alongside Ingrosso as a DJ and producer. Jettman also collaborated with Tim Bergling, also known as Avicii and Oliver Ingrosso on the song "iTrack". He followed this up with "Million Voices", created in the back room of the studio whilst Ingrosso and Alesso penned the popular festival song "Calling". "Million Voices" was later added to the A playlist at BBC Radio 1. It later charted in the top 15 of the UK Singles Chart and achieved gold in Australia, Ireland, the Netherlands, Sweden and platinum in Belgium.

== Career ==
=== 2010–2013: Breakthrough ===
His break came in 2010 on the electronic scene with a remix of "Hide and Seek" by Imogen Heap. This caught the attention of Tim Bergling that used his production in "Hide & Seek (Avicii Remix)". He has had a number of chart successes including his single "iTrack" credited to Tim Berg vs Oliver Ingrosso & Otto Knows and with his remix of Dada Life's "Kick Out the Epic Motherf**ker". His biggest hit is his 2012 European single "Million Voices" that has reached number three on the Ultratop 50, the Belgian Singles Chart and number six on the Dutch Singles Chart. It has also charted within the top 15 of the UK Singles Chart. In late 2012, Otto remixed "Lies" by British DJ/record producer Burns, which was included in the extended play release of the single in the UK. The remix proved to fair commercially better and peaked at number 32 in the UK Singles Chart on 24 December 2012 after four weeks. In 2013, he co-wrote and co-produced "Work Bitch" by Britney Spears.

=== 2014–present ===
In June 2014, Otto's follow‐up single "Parachute" was released. It was premiered by Danny Howard on his BBC1 radio show. In September 2014, Otto Knows also released a rework of Bebe Rexha's "I Can't Stop Drinking About You". The track was premiered by Otto at Bråvalla Festival in June and was played throughout the summer at Ushuaïa in Ibiza. In October 2014, four remixes of "Parachute" were released by Bottai, Drumsound & Bassline Smith, CamelPhat and Zastenker. In May 2015 Otto released the single "Next to Me".

In 2016, Otto released the single "Dying for You" featuring Lindsey Stirling and Alex Aris. The lyric video for the song was released on YouTube on 14 January 2016, with the official video following on 1 February.

== Discography ==
=== Singles ===
Title	Year	Peak chart positions									Certifications	Album
Title	Year	SWE	AUT	BEL	DEN	FRA	GER	NL	SWI	UK	Certifications	Album
"iTrack" (Avicii vs. Oliver Ingrosso & Otto Knows)	2010	—	—	—	—	—	—	53	—	—		Non-album singles
"Million Voices"	2012	36	14	3	35	52	20	6	19	14	GLF: Platinum; BEA: Gold; BPI: Platinum; BVMI: Platinum; IFPI DEN: Platinum	Non-album singles
"Parachute"	2014	27	—	—	—	—	67	64	—	—	GLF: 2× Platinum	Non-album singles
"Next to Me"	2015	7	55	69	—	—	—	—	52	103	GLF: 3× Platinum	Non-album singles
"Dying for You" (featuring Lindsey Stirling and Alex Aris)	2016	7	—	—	—	—	—	—	—	—		Non-album singles
"Back Where I Belong" (featuring Avicii)	2016	32	—	—	—	—	—	—	—	—		Non-album singles
"Not Alone"	2016	—	—	—	—	—	—	—	—	—		Non-album singles
"With You"	2017	— (Note: "With You" did not enter the Swedish Singellista Chart, but peaked at number three on the Swedish Heatseeker Chart.)	—	—	—	—	—	—	—	—		Non-album singles
"Friends"	2017	—	—	—	—	—	—	—	—	—		Non-album singles
"One in a Million"	2019	—	—	—	—	—	—	—	—	—		Non-album singles
"Something For Nothing" (with Klahr)	2019	—	—	—	—	—	—	—	—	—		Non-album singles
"About You"	2019	— (Note: "About You" did not enter the Swedish Singellista Chart, but peaked at number 14 on the Swedish Heatseeker Chart.)	—	—	—	—	—	—	—	—		Non-album singles
"Pyramids"	2022	—	—	—	—	—	—	—	—	—		Non-album singles
"Lover"	2022	—	—	—	—	—	—	—	—	—		Non-album singles
"Electricity"	2022	—	—	—	—	—	—	—	—	—		Non-album singles
"Randomize"	2022	—	—	—	—	—	—	—	—	—		Non-album singles
"Rosa"	2023	—	—	—	—	—	—	—	—	—		Non-album singles
"Say It To Me"	2023	—	—	—	—	—	—	—	—	—		Non-album singles
"Be Somebody"	2023	—	—	—	—	—	—	—	—	—		Non-album singles
"Your Love"	2024	—	—	—	—	—	—	—	—	—		Non-album singles
"Goodbye"	2025	—	—	—	—	—	—	—	—	—		Non-album singles
"Tequila" (with Håkan Hellström)	2026	82	—	—	—	—	—	—	—	—		Non-album singles
"—" denotes a single that did not chart or was not released in that territory.

=== Remixes ===
Title	Year	Peak chart positions		
Title	Year	BEL	NL	UK
"Hide and Seek" (Imogen Heap) (Otto Knows Bootleg Remix)	2011	—	—	—
"Twisted Love" (ATB) (Otto Knows Remix)	2011	—	—	—
"Kick Out the Epic Motherfucker" (Dada Life) (Otto Knows Remix)	2012	—	—	—
"Starlight (Could You Be Mine)" (Don Diablo) (Otto Knows Remix)	2012	—	—	—
"Lies" (Burns) (Otto Knows Remix)	2012	36	68	32
"Can't Stop Drinking About You" (Otto Knows vs Bebe Rexha)	2014	—	—	—
"Din tid kommer" (Håkan Hellström) (Otto Knows Remix)	2016	—	—	—
"Without You" (Avicii) (Otto Knows Remix)	2017	—	—	32
"—" denotes a song that did not chart or was not released in that territory.
