= Sun Valley on Ice =

Annual ice show

- Status: Ongoing
- Genre: Ice show
- Frequency: Annual
- Country: Sun Valley, Idaho, U.S.
- Inaugurated: 1937
- Most recent: 2023
- Major events: Skating exhibitions
- Organizer: Sun Valley Resort
- Website: www.sunvalley.com/things-to-do/ice-shows/

Sun Valley on Ice is an annual ice show organized by Sun Valley Resort. The show was created in 1937 and takes place on Saturday night throughout the summer, featuring the Sun Valley on Ice cast with invited national and international guest stars. The show takes place under the stars in Sun Valley Resort's outdoor ice rink with grandstand seating and seating at the terrace of Sun Valley Lodge that has a buffet and bar service throughout the performances.

== History ==
Sun Valley Lodge was specifically designed to display its outdoor ice rink with Sun Valley Resort founder Averell Harriman asking architect Gilbert Stanley Underwood to make the rink a focus. The resort and its rink opened in 1936, and in 1937, Sun Valley Lodge, Union Pacific and Sun Valley Skating Club created Sun Valley on Ice. Initially, the ice surface of the rink measured a small 120’ by 60’ until a larger rink was built in its place in 1955. In the 1940s, Sun Valley installed a refrigeration system that made it possible to keep the rink open all year, and the resort added an indoor rink in 1975. The well-known outdoor rink has appeared in the Sonia Henie movie Sun Valley Serenade (1941), an episode of Lucille Ball's I Love Lucy, and has played host to numerous world class skaters throughout the years.

In 2022, Sun Valley Resort started building a new refrigeration system after an electrical failure before the final show of the summer starring Jason Brown and Alysa Liu. The show had to be canceled for the safety of the skaters.

== Concept ==
Sun Valley on Ice consists of a season of outdoor summer ice shows that aim to highlight new stars, athletic performances and new sounds. Sun Valley on Ice was initially developed by Audrey Peppe and Herman Maricich. Peppe, a national champion and Olympic competitor from New York, headlined the first edition of the show and was one of the early head skating instructors at Sun Valley. Maricich eventually took over from her.

== Cast ==
Past invited skaters performing at Sun Valley on Ice include:

- (United States) Peggy Fleming
- (United States) Scott Hamilton
- (United States) Kristi Yamaguchi
- (Germany) Katarina Witt
- (Ukraine) Viktor Petrenko
- (United States) Brian Boitano
- (United States) Paul Wylie
- (Ukraine) Oksana Baiul
- (United States) Nancy Kerrigan
- (Slovakia) Jozef Sabovcik
- (United States) Tara Lipinski
- (Canada) Kurt Browning
- (United States) Michelle Kwan
- (United States) Sasha Cohen
- (United States) Johnny Weir
- (United States) Evan Lysacek
- (United States) Meryl Davis / Charlie White
- (United States) Ashley Wagner
- (United States) Jason Brown
- (United States) Nathan Chen
- (United States) Madison Chock / Evan Bates
- (United States) Mariah Bell
- (United States) Alexa Knierim / Brandon Frazier
- (United States) Isabeau Levito
- (United States) Madison Hubbell / Zachary Donahue
- (United States) Alysa Liu
