= Next to Me (Otto Knows song) =

Single by Otto Knows
- Released: 8 May 2015
- Recorded: 2014–15
- Genre: Progressive house
- Length: 3:22
- Label: Warner
- Songwriter(s): Otto Knows; Simon Strömstedt
- Producer(s): Otto Jettman

Otto Knows singles chronology
"Can't Stop Drinking About You" (2014)	"Next to Me" (2015)	"Dying For You" (2016)

"Next to Me" is a song by Swedish DJ and music producer Otto Knows. The song was released in Sweden as a digital download on 8 May 2015 through Warner Music Sweden. The song features uncredited vocals by Simon Strömstedt, who, with Otto Knows, wrote the song. The song has peaked at number 7 on the Swedish Singles Chart, making it his first Top 10 single in Sweden. The song has also charted in Austria, Belgium and Switzerland.

== Music video ==
A music video to accompany the release of "Next to Me" was first released on YouTube on 8 May 2015 at a total length of three minutes and twenty-three seconds. As of August 2021 the official music video has received over 12 million views. The official music video on YouTube is restricted by Warner Music Group in every country in the world except for Cuba, Iran (Islamic Republic of), North Korea & Syrian Arab Republic.

== Track listing ==
Digital download
No.	Title	Length
1.	"Next to Me"	3:22

Extended Version - CD
No.	Title	Length
2.	"Next to Me (Club Mix)"	5:44
Total length:		9:06

Remix - CD
No.	Title	Length
3.	"Next to Me (Matisse & Sadko Remix)"	5:02
Total length:		14:08

== Charts ==
=== Weekly charts ===
Chart (2014–15)	Peak position
Austria (Ö3 Austria Top 40)	55
Belgium (Ultratip Bubbling Under Flanders)	22
Belgium (Ultratip Bubbling Under Wallonia)	19
Sweden (Sverigetopplistan)	7
Switzerland (Schweizer Hitparade)	52
UK Dance (OCC)	25
UK Singles (Official Charts Company)	103
US Hot Dance/Electronic Songs (Billboard)	28

=== Year-end charts ===
Chart (2015)	Position
Sweden (Sverigetopplistan)	38

== Certifications ==
Region	Certification	Certified units/sales
Sweden (GLF)	3× Platinum	120,000^{‡}
^{‡} Sales+streaming figures based on certification alone.

== Release history ==
Region	Date	Format	Label
Sweden	8 May 2015	Digital download	Warner Music Sweden
