= Parachute (Otto Knows song) =

Single by Otto Knows
- Released: June 2014
- Recorded: 2014
- Genre: Dance; Electro house
- Length: 3:22
- Label: Refune Music
- Songwriter(s): Otto Knows; Simon Strömstedt
- Producer(s): Otto Jettman

Otto Knows singles chronology
"Million Voices" (2012)	"Parachute" (2014)	"Can't Stop Drinking About You" (2014)

"Parachute" is a song by Swedish DJ and music producer Otto Knows. The song was released as a digital download in June 2014 through Refune Music. The song was written by Otto Knows and Simon Strömstedt. The song peaked to number 27 on the Swedish Singles Chart and also charted in Germany and the Netherlands.

== Music video ==
A music video to accompany the release of "Parachute" was first released onto YouTube on 3 June 2014 at a total length of three minutes and forty-two seconds. It has received more than 3.2 million views as of March 2016.

== Track listing ==
Digital download
No.	Title	Length
1.	"Parachute" (Radio Edit)	3:22
2.	"Parachute" (Extended)	5:54

== Chart performance ==
=== Weekly charts ===
Chart (2014)	Peak position
Germany (GfK)	67
Netherlands (Single Top 100)	64
Sweden (Sverigetopplistan)	27

== Release history ==
Region	Date	Format	Label
Sweden	June 2014	Digital download	Refune Music
