= 2007–08 ISU World Standings =

Merit-based ice skating ranking

Season-end No. 1 skaters
- Men's singles: (Japan) Daisuke Takahashi
- Ladies' singles: (Japan) Mao Asada
- Pairs: (Germany) Aliona Savchenko / Robin Szolkowy
- Ice dance: (France) Isabelle Delobel / Olivier Schoenfelder

Navigation

The 2007–08 ISU World Standings, are the World Standings published by the International Skating Union (ISU) during the 2007–08 season.

The 2007–08 ISU World Standings for single & pair skating and ice dance, are taking into account results of the 2005–06, 2006–07 and 2007–08 seasons.

== World Standings for single & pair skating and ice dance ==
=== Season-end standings ===
The remainder of this section is a complete list, by discipline, published by the ISU.

==== Men's singles (193 skaters) ====
As of 22 March 2008

Rank	Nation	Skater	Points	Season	ISU Championships or Olympics	(Junior) Grand Prix and Final		Selected International Competition	
Rank	Nation	Skater	Points	Season	Best	Best	2nd Best	Best	2nd Best
1	JPN	Daisuke Takahashi	4249	2007/2008 season (100%)	875	720	400	0	0
1	JPN	Daisuke Takahashi	4249	2006/2007 season (100%)	1080	720	400	0	0
1	JPN	Daisuke Takahashi	4249	2005/2006 season (70%)	402	454	280	0	0
2	FRA	Brian Joubert	4132	2007/2008 season (100%)	1080	400	0	0	0
2	FRA	Brian Joubert	4132	2006/2007 season (100%)	1200	800	400	0	0
2	FRA	Brian Joubert	4132	2005/2006 season (70%)	756	252	227	0	0
3	SUI	Stéphane Lambiel	3932	2007/2008 season (100%)	787	800	360	0	0
3	SUI	Stéphane Lambiel	3932	2006/2007 season (100%)	972	400	0	0	0
3	SUI	Stéphane Lambiel	3932	2005/2006 season (70%)	840	560	252	0	0
4	CZE	Tomáš Verner	3793	2007/2008 season (100%)	840	360	236	250	203
4	CZE	Tomáš Verner	3793	2006/2007 season (100%)	875	292	262	250	225
4	CZE	Tomáš Verner	3793	2005/2006 season (70%)	237	0	0	175	142
5	CAN	Jeffrey Buttle	3356	2007/2008 season (100%)	1200	324	292	0	0
5	CAN	Jeffrey Buttle	3356	2006/2007 season (100%)	756	0	0	0	0
5	CAN	Jeffrey Buttle	3356	2005/2006 season (70%)	680	504	280	0	0
6	USA	Evan Lysacek	3288	2007/2008 season (100%)	680	648	360	0	0
6	USA	Evan Lysacek	3288	2006/2007 season (100%)	840	400	360	0	0
6	USA	Evan Lysacek	3288	2005/2006 season (70%)	680	252	252	0	0
7	USA	Johnny Weir	3213	2007/2008 season (100%)	972	583	400	0	0
7	USA	Johnny Weir	3213	2006/2007 season (100%)	574	360	324	0	0
7	USA	Johnny Weir	3213	2005/2006 season (70%)	551	227	149	0	0
8	BEL	Kevin van der Perren	3202	2007/2008 season (100%)	709	472	360	250	203
8	BEL	Kevin van der Perren	3202	2006/2007 season (100%)	680	292	236	0	0
8	BEL	Kevin van der Perren	3202	2005/2006 season (70%)	362	204	183	0	0
9	JPN	Nobunari Oda	2987	2007/2008 season (100%)	0	0	0	0	0
9	JPN	Nobunari Oda	2987	2006/2007 season (100%)	638	648	400	0	0
9	JPN	Nobunari Oda	2987	2005/2006 season (70%)	613	408	280	0	0
10	USA	Stephen Carriere	2793	2007/2008 season (100%)	612	324	292	0	0
10	USA	Stephen Carriere	2793	2006/2007 season (100%)	715	600	250	0	0
10	USA	Stephen Carriere	2793	2005/2006 season (70%)	365	248	175	0	0
11	CAN	Patrick Chan	2624	2007/2008 season (100%)	517	525	400	0	0
11	CAN	Patrick Chan	2624	2006/2007 season (100%)	644	262	213	0	0
11	CAN	Patrick Chan	2624	2005/2006 season (70%)	295	276	175	0	0
12	USA	Brandon Mroz	2622	2007/2008 season (100%)	521	540	250	0	0
12	USA	Brandon Mroz	2622	2006/2007 season (100%)	521	540	250	0	0
12	USA	Brandon Mroz	2622	2005/2006 season (70%)	0	0	0	0	0
13	FRA	Alban Préaubert	2427	2007/2008 season (100%)	325	324	262	0	0
13	FRA	Alban Préaubert	2427	2006/2007 season (100%)	496	583	360	0	0
13	FRA	Alban Préaubert	2427	2005/2006 season (70%)	402	165	0	0	0
14	JPN	Takahiko Kozuka	2317	2007/2008 season (100%)	574	262	191	0	0
14	JPN	Takahiko Kozuka	2317	2006/2007 season (100%)	0	324	236	0	0
14	JPN	Takahiko Kozuka	2317	2005/2006 season (70%)	501	420	175	0	0
15	BLR	Sergei Davydov	2254	2007/2008 season (100%)	377	292	236	0	0
15	BLR	Sergei Davydov	2254	2006/2007 season (100%)	612	360	262	0	0
15	BLR	Sergei Davydov	2254	2005/2006 season (70%)	264	134	0	115	0
16	CAN	Emanuel Sandhu	2147	2007/2008 season (100%)	0	0	0	0	0
16	CAN	Emanuel Sandhu	2147	2006/2007 season (100%)	362	324	262	0	0
16	CAN	Emanuel Sandhu	2147	2005/2006 season (70%)	551	368	280	0	0
17	RUS	Sergei Voronov	2074	2007/2008 season (100%)	638	360	0	0	0
17	RUS	Sergei Voronov	2074	2006/2007 season (100%)	579	213	0	0	0
17	RUS	Sergei Voronov	2074	2005/2006 season (70%)	451	142	142	0	0
18	CHN	Jinlin Guan	2028	2007/2008 season (100%)	579	394	250	0	0
18	CHN	Jinlin Guan	2028	2006/2007 season (100%)	422	225	0	0	0
18	CHN	Jinlin Guan	2028	2005/2006 season (70%)	83	158	127	0	0
19	RUS	Artem Borodulin	2021	2007/2008 season (100%)	644	250	203	0	0
19	RUS	Artem Borodulin	2021	2006/2007 season (100%)	380	319	225	0	0
19	RUS	Artem Borodulin	2021	2005/2006 season (70%)	0	127	115	0	0
20	USA	Jeremy Abbott	1964	2007/2008 season (100%)	551	292	191	0	0
20	USA	Jeremy Abbott	1964	2006/2007 season (100%)	680	0	0	250	0
20	USA	Jeremy Abbott	1964	2005/2006 season (70%)	0	0	0	0	0
21	CAN	Kevin Reynolds	1945	2007/2008 season (100%)	422	191	0	0	0
21	CAN	Kevin Reynolds	1945	2006/2007 season (100%)	469	486	250	0	0
21	CAN	Kevin Reynolds	1945	2005/2006 season (70%)	266	127	84	0	0
22	FRA	Yannick Ponsero	1881	2007/2008 season (100%)	264	236	236	250	0
22	FRA	Yannick Ponsero	1881	2006/2007 season (100%)	305	236	213	0	0
22	FRA	Yannick Ponsero	1881	2005/2006 season (70%)	405	183	149	0	0
23	CAN	Christopher Mabee	1767	2007/2008 season (100%)	0	292	191	0	0
23	CAN	Christopher Mabee	1767	2006/2007 season (100%)	551	0	0	0	0
23	CAN	Christopher Mabee	1767	2005/2006 season (70%)	529	204	0	0	0
24	JPN	Takahito Mura	1738	2007/2008 season (100%)	107	203	203	0	0
24	JPN	Takahito Mura	1738	2006/2007 season (100%)	342	437	225	0	0
24	JPN	Takahito Mura	1738	2005/2006 season (70%)	328	115	84	0	0
25	USA	Adam Rippon	1669	2007/2008 season (100%)	715	600	250	0	0
25	USA	Adam Rippon	1669	2006/2007 season (100%)	0	0	0	0	0
25	USA	Adam Rippon	1669	2005/2006 season (70%)	0	104	0	0	0
26	SWE	Kristoffer Berntsson	1652	2007/2008 season (100%)	446	0	0	250	0
26	SWE	Kristoffer Berntsson	1652	2006/2007 season (100%)	517	236	0	203	0
26	SWE	Kristoffer Berntsson	1652	2005/2006 season (70%)	150	0	0	0	0
27	RUS	Andrei Lutai	1598	2007/2008 season (100%)	402	213	0	0	0
27	RUS	Andrei Lutai	1598	2006/2007 season (100%)	551	0	0	250	182
27	RUS	Andrei Lutai	1598	2005/2006 season (70%)	0	0	0	0	0
28	SWE	Adrian Schultheiss	1582	2007/2008 season (100%)	496	182	148	225	0
28	SWE	Adrian Schultheiss	1582	2006/2007 season (100%)	182	164	148	0	0
28	SWE	Adrian Schultheiss	1582	2005/2006 season (70%)	103	175	158	0	0
29	CZE	Michal Brezina	1552	2007/2008 season (100%)	469	225	133	250	0
29	CZE	Michal Brezina	1552	2006/2007 season (100%)	147	164	0	164	0
29	CZE	Michal Brezina	1552	2005/2006 season (70%)	0	0	0	0	0
30	RUS	Alexander Uspenski	1530	2007/2008 season (100%)	0	262	213	0	0
30	RUS	Alexander Uspenski	1530	2006/2007 season (100%)	0	262	236	225	0
30	RUS	Alexander Uspenski	1530	2005/2006 season (70%)	239	306	175	0	0
31	SLO	Gregor Urbas	1522	2007/2008 season (100%)	293	0	0	250	203
31	SLO	Gregor Urbas	1522	2006/2007 season (100%)	362	0	0	250	164
31	SLO	Gregor Urbas	1522	2005/2006 season (70%)	109	0	0	158	0
32	CAN	Shawn Sawyer	1487	2007/2008 season (100%)	362	213	0	0	0
32	CAN	Shawn Sawyer	1487	2006/2007 season (100%)	0	292	191	0	0
32	CAN	Shawn Sawyer	1487	2005/2006 season (70%)	264	165	149	0	0
33	JPN	Kensuke Nakaniwa	1415	2007/2008 season (100%)	264	213	191	0	0
33	JPN	Kensuke Nakaniwa	1415	2006/2007 season (100%)	402	262	0	0	0
33	JPN	Kensuke Nakaniwa	1415	2005/2006 season (70%)	347	0	0	0	0
34	RUS	Sergei Dobrin	1403	2007/2008 season (100%)	0	262	0	0	0
34	RUS	Sergei Dobrin	1403	2006/2007 season (100%)	140	324	191	203	0
34	RUS	Sergei Dobrin	1403	2005/2006 season (70%)	134	149	0	0	0
35	CZE	Pavel Kaska	1339	2007/2008 season (100%)	0	213	0	182	182
35	CZE	Pavel Kaska	1339	2006/2007 season (100%)	126	203	164	0	0
35	CZE	Pavel Kaska	1339	2005/2006 season (70%)	68	201	115	0	0
36	RUS	Andrei Griazev	1305	2007/2008 season (100%)	0	324	213	0	0
36	RUS	Andrei Griazev	1305	2006/2007 season (100%)	173	213	213	0	0
36	RUS	Andrei Griazev	1305	2005/2006 season (70%)	155	227	0	0	0
37	USA	Ryan Bradley	1301	2007/2008 season (100%)	0	262	236	0	0
37	USA	Ryan Bradley	1301	2006/2007 season (100%)	612	191	0	0	0
37	USA	Ryan Bradley	1301	2005/2006 season (70%)	0	0	0	0	0
38	CHN	Chengjiang Li	1284	2007/2008 season (100%)	496	0	0	0	0
38	CHN	Chengjiang Li	1284	2006/2007 season (100%)	0	292	0	0	0
38	CHN	Chengjiang Li	1284	2005/2006 season (70%)	362	134	0	0	0
39	ITA	Karel Zelenka	1275	2007/2008 season (100%)	247	236	0	0	0
39	ITA	Karel Zelenka	1275	2006/2007 season (100%)	446	0	0	182	164
39	ITA	Karel Zelenka	1275	2005/2006 season (70%)	88	0	0	0	0
40	USA	Austin Kanallakan	1269	2007/2008 season (100%)	0	354	250	0	0
40	USA	Austin Kanallakan	1269	2006/2007 season (100%)	0	287	250	0	0
40	USA	Austin Kanallakan	1269	2005/2006 season (70%)	0	378	158	0	0
41	USA	Tommy Steenberg	1235	2007/2008 season (100%)	308	148	0	0	0
41	USA	Tommy Steenberg	1235	2006/2007 season (100%)	0	354	250	0	0
41	USA	Tommy Steenberg	1235	2005/2006 season (70%)	0	175	76	0	0
42	CHN	Jialiang Wu	1203	2007/2008 season (100%)	325	0	0	0	0
42	CHN	Jialiang Wu	1203	2006/2007 season (100%)	496	191	191	0	0
42	CHN	Jialiang Wu	1203	2005/2006 season (70%)	228	0	0	0	0
43	CAN	Vaughn Chipeur	1124	2007/2008 season (100%)	446	262	0	0	0
43	CAN	Vaughn Chipeur	1124	2006/2007 season (100%)	0	213	0	203	0
43	CAN	Vaughn Chipeur	1124	2005/2006 season (70%)	0	0	0	0	0
44	RUS	Evgeni Plushenko	1120	2007/2008 season (100%)	0	0	0	0	0
44	RUS	Evgeni Plushenko	1120	2006/2007 season (100%)	0	0	0	0	0
44	RUS	Evgeni Plushenko	1120	2005/2006 season (70%)	840	280	0	0	0
45	FRA	Kim Lucine	1113	2007/2008 season (100%)	249	164	148	0	0
45	FRA	Kim Lucine	1113	2006/2007 season (100%)	224	164	164	0	0
45	FRA	Kim Lucine	1113	2005/2006 season (70%)	92	104	68	0	0
46	JPN	Tatsuki Machida	1073	2007/2008 season (100%)	0	250	108	0	0
46	JPN	Tatsuki Machida	1073	2006/2007 season (100%)	308	225	182	0	0
46	JPN	Tatsuki Machida	1073	2005/2006 season (70%)	0	93	68	0	0
47	CAN	Jeremy Ten	1050	2007/2008 season (100%)	342	203	120	0	0
47	CAN	Jeremy Ten	1050	2006/2007 season (100%)	0	203	182	0	0
47	CAN	Jeremy Ten	1050	2005/2006 season (70%)	0	84	0	0	0
48	CHN	Chao Yang	1031	2007/2008 season (100%)	164	203	164	0	0
48	CHN	Chao Yang	1031	2006/2007 season (100%)	0	164	0	0	0
48	CHN	Chao Yang	1031	2005/2006 season (70%)	194	142	0	0	0
49	RUS	Ilia Klimkin	1002	2007/2008 season (100%)	0	0	0	0	0
49	RUS	Ilia Klimkin	1002	2006/2007 season (100%)	0	324	292	0	0
49	RUS	Ilia Klimkin	1002	2005/2006 season (70%)	386	0	0	0	0
50	USA	Eliot Halverson	980	2007/2008 season (100%)	0	164	133	0	0
50	USA	Eliot Halverson	980	2006/2007 season (100%)	277	203	203	0	0
50	USA	Eliot Halverson	980	2005/2006 season (70%)	0	0	0	0	0
51	GER	Stefan Lindemann	941	2007/2008 season (100%)	0	0	0	0	0
51	GER	Stefan Lindemann	941	2006/2007 season (100%)	377	0	0	0	0
51	GER	Stefan Lindemann	941	2005/2006 season (70%)	185	204	0	175	0
52	RUS	Ivan Bariev	924	2007/2008 season (100%)	380	319	225	0	0
52	RUS	Ivan Bariev	924	2006/2007 season (100%)	0	0	0	0	0
52	RUS	Ivan Bariev	924	2005/2006 season (70%)	0	0	0	0	0
53	SUI	Moris Pfeifhofer	923	2007/2008 season (100%)	224	133	0	0	0
53	SUI	Moris Pfeifhofer	923	2006/2007 season (100%)	214	148	120	0	0
53	SUI	Moris Pfeifhofer	923	2005/2006 season (70%)	127	84	68	0	0
54	FRA	Florent Amodio	920	2007/2008 season (100%)	277	164	133	0	0
54	FRA	Florent Amodio	920	2006/2007 season (100%)	164	182	0	0	0
54	FRA	Florent Amodio	920	2005/2006 season (70%)	0	0	0	0	0
55	USA	Scott Smith	914	2007/2008 season (100%)	0	0	0	0	0
55	USA	Scott Smith	914	2006/2007 season (100%)	0	292	236	0	0
55	USA	Scott Smith	914	2005/2006 season (70%)	386	0	0	0	0
56	USA	Douglas Razzano	899	2007/2008 season (100%)	0	437	225	0	0
56	USA	Douglas Razzano	899	2006/2007 season (100%)	0	133	0	0	0
56	USA	Douglas Razzano	899	2005/2006 season (70%)	0	104	0	0	0
57	RUS	Vladimir Uspenski	835	2007/2008 season (100%)	0	182	120	203	0
57	RUS	Vladimir Uspenski	835	2006/2007 season (100%)	0	203	108	0	0
57	RUS	Vladimir Uspenski	835	2005/2006 season (70%)	0	127	0	0	0
58	USA	Matthew Savoie	808	2007/2008 season (100%)	0	0	0	0	0
58	USA	Matthew Savoie	808	2006/2007 season (100%)	0	0	0	0	0
58	USA	Matthew Savoie	808	2005/2006 season (70%)	476	183	149	0	0
59	FRA	Mark Vaillant	805	2007/2008 season (100%)	0	148	120	225	0
59	FRA	Mark Vaillant	805	2006/2007 season (100%)	0	164	148	0	0
59	FRA	Mark Vaillant	805	2005/2006 season (70%)	0	0	0	0	0
60	RUS	Ivan Tretiakov	790	2007/2008 season (100%)	0	120	0	164	0
60	RUS	Ivan Tretiakov	790	2006/2007 season (100%)	0	182	182	0	0
60	RUS	Ivan Tretiakov	790	2005/2006 season (70%)	0	142	104	0	0
61	USA	Curran Oi	767	2007/2008 season (100%)	0	148	0	0	0
61	USA	Curran Oi	767	2006/2007 season (100%)	0	394	225	0	0
61	USA	Curran Oi	767	2005/2006 season (70%)	0	0	0	0	0
62	USA	Armin Mahbanoozadeh	736	2007/2008 season (100%)	0	486	250	0	0
62	USA	Armin Mahbanoozadeh	736	2006/2007 season (100%)	0	0	0	0	0
62	USA	Armin Mahbanoozadeh	736	2005/2006 season (70%)	0	0	0	0	0
63	SUI	Jamal Othman	724	2007/2008 season (100%)	131	191	0	0	0
63	SUI	Jamal Othman	724	2006/2007 season (100%)	402	0	0	0	0
63	SUI	Jamal Othman	724	2005/2006 season (70%)	71	0	0	0	0
64	JPN	Ryo Shibata	719	2007/2008 season (100%)	0	0	0	164	0
64	JPN	Ryo Shibata	719	2006/2007 season (100%)	0	0	0	0	0
64	JPN	Ryo Shibata	719	2005/2006 season (70%)	157	223	175	0	0
65	USA	Geoffry Varner	714	2007/2008 season (100%)	0	0	0	0	0
65	USA	Geoffry Varner	714	2006/2007 season (100%)	0	0	0	0	0
65	USA	Geoffry Varner	714	2005/2006 season (70%)	216	340	158	0	0
66	JPN	Yasuharu Nanri	710	2007/2008 season (100%)	180	0	0	0	0
66	JPN	Yasuharu Nanri	710	2006/2007 season (100%)	264	0	0	0	0
66	JPN	Yasuharu Nanri	710	2005/2006 season (70%)	312	134	0	0	0
67	RUS	Artem Grigoriev	672	2007/2008 season (100%)	0	203	203	0	0
67	RUS	Artem Grigoriev	672	2006/2007 season (100%)	0	133	133	0	0
67	RUS	Artem Grigoriev	672	2005/2006 season (70%)	0	93	0	0	0
68	GER	Philipp Tischendorf	668	2007/2008 season (100%)	0	0	0	0	0
68	GER	Philipp Tischendorf	668	2006/2007 season (100%)	202	120	120	0	0
68	GER	Philipp Tischendorf	668	2005/2006 season (70%)	0	142	84	0	0
69	CHN	Min Zhang	643	2007/2008 season (100%)	0	0	0	0	0
69	CHN	Min Zhang	643	2006/2007 season (100%)	0	0	0	0	0
69	CHN	Min Zhang	643	2005/2006 season (70%)	326	183	134	0	0
70	UKR	Nikolai Bondar	619	2007/2008 season (100%)	182	164	97	0	0
70	UKR	Nikolai Bondar	619	2006/2007 season (100%)	0	108	0	0	0
70	UKR	Nikolai Bondar	619	2005/2006 season (70%)	0	68	0	0	0
70	CAN	Marc Andre Craig	619	2007/2008 season (100%)	0	0	0	0	0
70	CAN	Marc Andre Craig	619	2006/2007 season (100%)	0	191	0	0	0
70	CAN	Marc Andre Craig	619	2005/2006 season (70%)	428	0	0	0	0
72	CHN	Ming Xu	618	2007/2008 season (100%)	293	0	0	0	0
72	CHN	Ming Xu	618	2006/2007 season (100%)	325	0	0	0	0
72	CHN	Ming Xu	618	2005/2006 season (70%)	0	0	0	0	0
73	GER	Clemens Brummer	599	2007/2008 season (100%)	214	0	0	203	182
73	GER	Clemens Brummer	599	2006/2007 season (100%)	0	0	0	0	0
73	GER	Clemens Brummer	599	2005/2006 season (70%)	0	0	0	0	0
74	USA	Daisuke Murakami	559	2007/2008 season (100%)	0	0	0	0	0
74	USA	Daisuke Murakami	559	2006/2007 season (100%)	0	203	182	0	0
74	USA	Daisuke Murakami	559	2005/2006 season (70%)	174	0	0	0	0
75	GER	Martin Liebers	549	2007/2008 season (100%)	0	0	0	182	164
75	GER	Martin Liebers	549	2006/2007 season (100%)	0	0	0	203	0
75	GER	Martin Liebers	549	2005/2006 season (70%)	0	0	0	0	0
76	CAN	Joey Russell	546	2007/2008 season (100%)	0	0	0	0	0
76	CAN	Joey Russell	546	2006/2007 season (100%)	249	182	0	0	0
76	CAN	Joey Russell	546	2005/2006 season (70%)	0	115	0	0	0
77	CAN	Ian Martinez	522	2007/2008 season (100%)	0	164	97	0	0
77	CAN	Ian Martinez	522	2006/2007 season (100%)	0	164	97	0	0
77	CAN	Ian Martinez	522	2005/2006 season (70%)	0	0	0	0	0
77	JPN	Hirofumi Torii	522	2007/2008 season (100%)	0	0	0	0	0
77	JPN	Hirofumi Torii	522	2006/2007 season (100%)	78	203	148	0	0
77	JPN	Hirofumi Torii	522	2005/2006 season (70%)	0	93	0	0	0
79	RUS	Artur Gachinski	512	2007/2008 season (100%)	0	287	225	0	0
79	RUS	Artur Gachinski	512	2006/2007 season (100%)	0	0	0	0	0
79	RUS	Artur Gachinski	512	2005/2006 season (70%)	0	0	0	0	0
80	GER	Peter Liebers	505	2007/2008 season (100%)	237	0	0	0	0
80	GER	Peter Liebers	505	2006/2007 season (100%)	0	0	0	0	0
80	GER	Peter Liebers	505	2005/2006 season (70%)	141	127	0	0	0
81	KAZ	Denis Ten	489	2007/2008 season (100%)	147	148	97	0	0
81	KAZ	Denis Ten	489	2006/2007 season (100%)	0	97	0	0	0
81	KAZ	Denis Ten	489	2005/2006 season (70%)	0	0	0	0	0
82	SVK	Igor Macypura	484	2007/2008 season (100%)	146	0	0	182	0
82	SVK	Igor Macypura	484	2006/2007 season (100%)	156	0	0	0	0
82	SVK	Igor Macypura	484	2005/2006 season (70%)	0	0	0	0	0
83	ROU	Gheorghe Chiper	480	2007/2008 season (100%)	0	0	0	0	0
83	ROU	Gheorghe Chiper	480	2006/2007 season (100%)	0	0	0	0	0
83	ROU	Gheorghe Chiper	480	2005/2006 season (70%)	253	227	0	0	0
84	CAN	Elladj Balde	465	2007/2008 season (100%)	87	133	0	0	0
84	CAN	Elladj Balde	465	2006/2007 season (100%)	0	148	97	0	0
84	CAN	Elladj Balde	465	2005/2006 season (70%)	0	0	0	0	0
85	AUT	Viktor Pfeifer	460	2007/2008 season (100%)	0	0	0	0	0
85	AUT	Viktor Pfeifer	460	2006/2007 season (100%)	0	0	0	0	0
85	AUT	Viktor Pfeifer	460	2005/2006 season (70%)	115	115	115	115	0
86	USA	Parker Pennington	450	2007/2008 season (100%)	0	0	0	225	0
86	USA	Parker Pennington	450	2006/2007 season (100%)	0	0	0	225	0
86	USA	Parker Pennington	450	2005/2006 season (70%)	0	0	0	0	0
87	AUS	Sean Carlow	422	2007/2008 season (100%)	0	0	0	0	0
87	AUS	Sean Carlow	422	2006/2007 season (100%)	237	0	0	0	0
87	AUS	Sean Carlow	422	2005/2006 season (70%)	185	0	0	0	0
88	UKR	Anton Kovalevski	410	2007/2008 season (100%)	162	0	0	0	0
88	UKR	Anton Kovalevski	410	2006/2007 season (100%)	237	0	0	0	0
88	UKR	Anton Kovalevski	410	2005/2006 season (70%)	173	0	0	0	0
88	SWE	Alexander Majorov	410	2007/2008 season (100%)	0	97	97	0	0
88	SWE	Alexander Majorov	410	2006/2007 season (100%)	0	108	108	0	0
88	SWE	Alexander Majorov	410	2005/2006 season (70%)	0	0	0	0	0
90	ITA	Samuel Contesti	408	2007/2008 season (100%)	0	0	0	225	0
90	ITA	Samuel Contesti	408	2006/2007 season (100%)	0	0	0	0	0
90	ITA	Samuel Contesti	408	2005/2006 season (70%)	0	183	0	0	0
91	RUS	Denis Leushin	407	2007/2008 season (100%)	0	0	0	0	0
91	RUS	Denis Leushin	407	2006/2007 season (100%)	0	0	0	225	182
91	RUS	Denis Leushin	407	2005/2006 season (70%)	0	0	0	0	0
92	NZL	Tristan Thode	406	2007/2008 season (100%)	214	0	0	0	0
92	NZL	Tristan Thode	406	2006/2007 season (100%)	192	0	0	0	0
92	NZL	Tristan Thode	406	2005/2006 season (70%)	98	0	0	0	0
93	FRA	Christopher Boyadji	392	2007/2008 season (100%)	0	164	108	0	0
93	FRA	Christopher Boyadji	392	2006/2007 season (100%)	0	120	0	0	0
93	FRA	Christopher Boyadji	392	2005/2006 season (70%)	0	0	0	0	0
94	UKR	Alexei Bychenko	391	2007/2008 season (100%)	0	0	0	203	0
94	UKR	Alexei Bychenko	391	2006/2007 season (100%)	0	120	0	0	0
94	UKR	Alexei Bychenko	391	2005/2006 season (70%)	0	68	0	0	0
95	USA	Nicholas Laroche	389	2007/2008 season (100%)	0	0	0	225	0
95	USA	Nicholas Laroche	389	2006/2007 season (100%)	0	0	0	164	0
95	USA	Nicholas Laroche	389	2005/2006 season (70%)	0	0	0	0	0
95	RUS	Konstantin Menshov	389	2007/2008 season (100%)	0	0	0	225	164
95	RUS	Konstantin Menshov	389	2006/2007 season (100%)	0	0	0	0	0
95	RUS	Konstantin Menshov	389	2005/2006 season (70%)	0	0	0	0	0
97	RUS	Daniil Gleichengauz	364	2007/2008 season (100%)	0	164	0	0	0
97	RUS	Daniil Gleichengauz	364	2006/2007 season (100%)	107	0	0	0	0
97	RUS	Daniil Gleichengauz	364	2005/2006 season (70%)	0	93	0	0	0
98	CAN	Kevin Darwish	357	2007/2008 season (100%)	0	0	0	0	0
98	CAN	Kevin Darwish	357	2006/2007 season (100%)	0	133	120	0	0
98	CAN	Kevin Darwish	357	2005/2006 season (70%)	0	104	0	0	0
99	NZL	Joel Watson	354	2007/2008 season (100%)	140	0	0	0	0
99	NZL	Joel Watson	354	2006/2007 season (100%)	214	0	0	0	0
99	NZL	Joel Watson	354	2005/2006 season (70%)	71	0	0	0	0
100	MEX	Luis Hernandez	348	2007/2008 season (100%)	192	0	0	0	0
100	MEX	Luis Hernandez	348	2006/2007 season (100%)	156	0	0	0	0
100	MEX	Luis Hernandez	348	2005/2006 season (70%)	109	0	0	0	0
101	KAZ	Abzal Rakimgaliev	345	2007/2008 season (100%)	237	108	0	0	0
101	KAZ	Abzal Rakimgaliev	345	2006/2007 season (100%)	0	0	0	0	0
101	KAZ	Abzal Rakimgaliev	345	2005/2006 season (70%)	0	0	0	0	0
102	BUL	Ivan Dinev	339	2007/2008 season (100%)	0	0	0	0	0
102	BUL	Ivan Dinev	339	2006/2007 season (100%)	0	0	0	0	0
102	BUL	Ivan Dinev	339	2005/2006 season (70%)	205	134	0	0	0
103	SVK	Jakub Strobl	336	2007/2008 season (100%)	70	0	0	0	0
103	SVK	Jakub Strobl	336	2006/2007 season (100%)	0	133	133	0	0
103	SVK	Jakub Strobl	336	2005/2006 season (70%)	0	0	0	0	0
104	AUS	Nicholas Fernandez	329	2007/2008 season (100%)	156	0	0	0	0
104	AUS	Nicholas Fernandez	329	2006/2007 season (100%)	173	0	0	0	0
104	AUS	Nicholas Fernandez	329	2005/2006 season (70%)	0	0	0	0	0
105	UKR	Vitali Sazonets	326	2007/2008 season (100%)	113	0	0	0	0
105	UKR	Vitali Sazonets	326	2006/2007 season (100%)	0	0	0	0	0
105	UKR	Vitali Sazonets	326	2005/2006 season (70%)	44	93	76	0	0
106	JPN	Akio Sasaki	314	2007/2008 season (100%)	132	182	0	0	0
106	JPN	Akio Sasaki	314	2006/2007 season (100%)	0	0	0	0	0
106	JPN	Akio Sasaki	314	2005/2006 season (70%)	0	0	0	0	0
107	ESP	Javier Fernandez	310	2007/2008 season (100%)	202	108	0	0	0
107	ESP	Javier Fernandez	310	2006/2007 season (100%)	0	0	0	0	0
107	ESP	Javier Fernandez	310	2005/2006 season (70%)	0	0	0	0	0
108	ITA	Paolo Bacchini	308	2007/2008 season (100%)	126	0	0	182	0
108	ITA	Paolo Bacchini	308	2006/2007 season (100%)	0	0	0	0	0
108	ITA	Paolo Bacchini	308	2005/2006 season (70%)	0	0	0	0	0
109	ITA	Marco Fabbri	307	2007/2008 season (100%)	0	0	0	0	0
109	ITA	Marco Fabbri	307	2006/2007 season (100%)	119	120	0	0	0
109	ITA	Marco Fabbri	307	2005/2006 season (70%)	0	68	0	0	0
110	RSA	Justin Pietersen	299	2007/2008 season (100%)	173	0	0	0	0
110	RSA	Justin Pietersen	299	2006/2007 season (100%)	126	0	0	0	0
110	RSA	Justin Pietersen	299	2005/2006 season (70%)	121	0	0	0	0
111	CHN	Zhixue Yang	293	2007/2008 season (100%)	0	0	0	0	0
111	CHN	Zhixue Yang	293	2006/2007 season (100%)	293	0	0	0	0
111	CHN	Zhixue Yang	293	2005/2006 season (70%)	0	0	0	0	0
112	GBR	John Hamer	284	2007/2008 season (100%)	0	0	0	0	0
112	GBR	John Hamer	284	2006/2007 season (100%)	102	0	0	182	0
112	GBR	John Hamer	284	2005/2006 season (70%)	0	0	0	0	0
113	GER	Silvio Smalun	281	2007/2008 season (100%)	0	0	0	0	0
113	GER	Silvio Smalun	281	2006/2007 season (100%)	0	0	0	0	0
113	GER	Silvio Smalun	281	2005/2006 season (70%)	281	0	0	0	0
114	POL	Przemyslaw Domanski	277	2007/2008 season (100%)	0	0	0	164	0
114	POL	Przemyslaw Domanski	277	2006/2007 season (100%)	113	0	0	0	0
114	POL	Przemyslaw Domanski	277	2005/2006 season (70%)	0	0	0	0	0
115	GER	Christopher Berneck	253	2007/2008 season (100%)	0	133	120	0	0
115	GER	Christopher Berneck	253	2006/2007 season (100%)	0	0	0	0	0
115	GER	Christopher Berneck	253	2005/2006 season (70%)	0	0	0	0	0
116	FRA	Yoann Deslot	250	2007/2008 season (100%)	0	0	0	250	0
116	FRA	Yoann Deslot	250	2006/2007 season (100%)	0	0	0	0	0
116	FRA	Yoann Deslot	250	2005/2006 season (70%)	0	0	0	0	0
117	USA	Craig Ratterree	246	2007/2008 season (100%)	0	0	0	0	0
117	USA	Craig Ratterree	246	2006/2007 season (100%)	0	0	0	0	0
117	USA	Craig Ratterree	246	2005/2006 season (70%)	0	142	104	0	0
118	ITA	Yannick Kocon	243	2007/2008 season (100%)	0	0	0	0	0
118	ITA	Yannick Kocon	243	2006/2007 season (100%)	0	0	0	0	0
118	ITA	Yannick Kocon	243	2005/2006 season (70%)	75	84	84	0	0
119	USA	Traighe Rouse	242	2007/2008 season (100%)	0	0	0	0	0
119	USA	Traighe Rouse	242	2006/2007 season (100%)	0	0	0	0	0
119	USA	Traighe Rouse	242	2005/2006 season (70%)	0	158	84	0	0
120	POL	Maciej Cieplucha	236	2007/2008 season (100%)	63	0	0	0	0
120	POL	Maciej Cieplucha	236	2006/2007 season (100%)	97	0	0	0	0
120	POL	Maciej Cieplucha	236	2005/2006 season (70%)	0	76	0	0	0
121	CAN	Andrew Lum	230	2007/2008 season (100%)	0	133	0	0	0
121	CAN	Andrew Lum	230	2006/2007 season (100%)	0	97	0	0	0
121	CAN	Andrew Lum	230	2005/2006 season (70%)	0	0	0	0	0
122	RUS	Gordei Gorshkov	228	2007/2008 season (100%)	0	120	0	0	0
122	RUS	Gordei Gorshkov	228	2006/2007 season (100%)	0	108	0	0	0
122	RUS	Gordei Gorshkov	228	2005/2006 season (70%)	0	0	0	0	0
123	USA	Shaun Rogers	225	2007/2008 season (100%)	0	0	0	225	0
123	USA	Shaun Rogers	225	2006/2007 season (100%)	0	0	0	0	0
123	USA	Shaun Rogers	225	2005/2006 season (70%)	0	0	0	0	0
124	JPN	Takemochi Ogami	220	2007/2008 season (100%)	0	0	0	0	0
124	JPN	Takemochi Ogami	220	2006/2007 season (100%)	0	0	0	0	0
124	JPN	Takemochi Ogami	220	2005/2006 season (70%)	0	127	93	0	0
125	BLR	Alexandr Kazakov	216	2007/2008 season (100%)	140	0	0	0	0
125	BLR	Alexandr Kazakov	216	2006/2007 season (100%)	0	0	0	0	0
125	BLR	Alexandr Kazakov	216	2005/2006 season (70%)	0	76	0	0	0
126	FRA	Romain Ponsart	205	2007/2008 season (100%)	0	108	97	0	0
126	FRA	Romain Ponsart	205	2006/2007 season (100%)	0	0	0	0	0
126	FRA	Romain Ponsart	205	2005/2006 season (70%)	0	0	0	0	0
126	CAN	Nicholas Young	205	2007/2008 season (100%)	0	0	0	0	0
126	CAN	Nicholas Young	205	2006/2007 season (100%)	0	0	0	0	0
126	CAN	Nicholas Young	205	2005/2006 season (70%)	205	0	0	0	0
128	FRA	Jeremie Colot	203	2007/2008 season (100%)	0	0	0	203	0
128	FRA	Jeremie Colot	203	2006/2007 season (100%)	0	0	0	0	0
128	FRA	Jeremie Colot	203	2005/2006 season (70%)	0	0	0	0	0
129	CAN	Jean-Simon Legare	196	2007/2008 season (100%)	0	120	0	0	0
129	CAN	Jean-Simon Legare	196	2006/2007 season (100%)	0	0	0	0	0
129	CAN	Jean-Simon Legare	196	2005/2006 season (70%)	0	76	0	0	0
129	JPN	Yukihiro Yoshida	196	2007/2008 season (100%)	0	0	0	0	0
129	JPN	Yukihiro Yoshida	196	2006/2007 season (100%)	0	120	0	0	0
129	JPN	Yukihiro Yoshida	196	2005/2006 season (70%)	0	76	0	0	0
131	RUS	Nikita Mikhailov	194	2007/2008 season (100%)	97	0	0	0	0
131	RUS	Nikita Mikhailov	194	2006/2007 season (100%)	0	97	0	0	0
131	RUS	Nikita Mikhailov	194	2005/2006 season (70%)	0	0	0	0	0
132	MEX	Humberto Contreras	190	2007/2008 season (100%)	102	0	0	0	0
132	MEX	Humberto Contreras	190	2006/2007 season (100%)	0	0	0	0	0
132	MEX	Humberto Contreras	190	2005/2006 season (70%)	88	0	0	0	0
133	RUS	Ilia Gurilev	182	2007/2008 season (100%)	0	182	0	0	0
133	RUS	Ilia Gurilev	182	2006/2007 season (100%)	0	0	0	0	0
133	RUS	Ilia Gurilev	182	2005/2006 season (70%)	0	0	0	0	0
133	USA	Alexander Johnson	182	2007/2008 season (100%)	0	182	0	0	0
133	USA	Alexander Johnson	182	2006/2007 season (100%)	0	0	0	0	0
133	USA	Alexander Johnson	182	2005/2006 season (70%)	0	0	0	0	0
133	FRA	Jeremy Prevoteaux	182	2007/2008 season (100%)	0	0	0	182	0
133	FRA	Jeremy Prevoteaux	182	2006/2007 season (100%)	0	0	0	0	0
133	FRA	Jeremy Prevoteaux	182	2005/2006 season (70%)	0	0	0	0	0
133	CHN	Nan Song	182	2007/2008 season (100%)	0	182	0	0	0
133	CHN	Nan Song	182	2006/2007 season (100%)	0	0	0	0	0
133	CHN	Nan Song	182	2005/2006 season (70%)	0	0	0	0	0
137	CAN	Karolin Metivier	180	2007/2008 season (100%)	0	0	0	0	0
137	CAN	Karolin Metivier	180	2006/2007 season (100%)	0	0	0	0	0
137	CAN	Karolin Metivier	180	2005/2006 season (70%)	0	104	76	0	0
138	AUS	Robert McNamara	177	2007/2008 season (100%)	113	0	0	0	0
138	AUS	Robert McNamara	177	2006/2007 season (100%)	0	0	0	0	0
138	AUS	Robert McNamara	177	2005/2006 season (70%)	64	0	0	0	0
139	USA	Ryan Jahnke	165	2007/2008 season (100%)	0	0	0	0	0
139	USA	Ryan Jahnke	165	2006/2007 season (100%)	0	0	0	0	0
139	USA	Ryan Jahnke	165	2005/2006 season (70%)	0	165	0	0	0
140	USA	Derrick Delmore	164	2007/2008 season (100%)	0	0	0	164	0
140	USA	Derrick Delmore	164	2006/2007 season (100%)	0	0	0	0	0
140	USA	Derrick Delmore	164	2005/2006 season (70%)	0	0	0	0	0
141	PHI	Michael Novales	150	2007/2008 season (100%)	0	0	0	0	0
141	PHI	Michael Novales	150	2006/2007 season (100%)	0	0	0	0	0
141	PHI	Michael Novales	150	2005/2006 season (70%)	150	0	0	0	0
142	USA	Dennis Phan	149	2007/2008 season (100%)	0	0	0	0	0
142	USA	Dennis Phan	149	2006/2007 season (100%)	0	0	0	0	0
142	USA	Dennis Phan	149	2005/2006 season (70%)	0	149	0	0	0
143	CHN	Gongming Cheng	148	2007/2008 season (100%)	0	148	0	0	0
143	CHN	Gongming Cheng	148	2006/2007 season (100%)	0	0	0	0	0
143	CHN	Gongming Cheng	148	2005/2006 season (70%)	0	0	0	0	0
143	USA	Richard Dornbush	148	2007/2008 season (100%)	0	148	0	0	0
143	USA	Richard Dornbush	148	2006/2007 season (100%)	0	0	0	0	0
143	USA	Richard Dornbush	148	2005/2006 season (70%)	0	0	0	0	0
143	GER	Norman Keck	148	2007/2008 season (100%)	0	0	0	0	0
143	GER	Norman Keck	148	2006/2007 season (100%)	0	148	0	0	0
143	GER	Norman Keck	148	2005/2006 season (70%)	0	0	0	0	0
143	USA	Princeton Kwong	148	2007/2008 season (100%)	0	0	0	0	0
143	USA	Princeton Kwong	148	2006/2007 season (100%)	0	148	0	0	0
143	USA	Princeton Kwong	148	2005/2006 season (70%)	0	0	0	0	0
143	CAN	Patrick Wong	148	2007/2008 season (100%)	0	0	0	0	0
143	CAN	Patrick Wong	148	2006/2007 season (100%)	0	148	0	0	0
143	CAN	Patrick Wong	148	2005/2006 season (70%)	0	0	0	0	0
148	AUT	Manuel Koll	146	2007/2008 season (100%)	83	0	0	0	0
148	AUT	Manuel Koll	146	2006/2007 season (100%)	63	0	0	0	0
148	AUT	Manuel Koll	146	2005/2006 season (70%)	0	0	0	0	0
149	GEO	Vakhtang Murvanidze	142	2007/2008 season (100%)	0	0	0	0	0
149	GEO	Vakhtang Murvanidze	142	2006/2007 season (100%)	0	0	0	0	0
149	GEO	Vakhtang Murvanidze	142	2005/2006 season (70%)	0	0	0	142	0
150	FIN	Ari-Pekka Nurmenkari	141	2007/2008 season (100%)	0	0	0	0	0
150	FIN	Ari-Pekka Nurmenkari	141	2006/2007 season (100%)	83	0	0	0	0
150	FIN	Ari-Pekka Nurmenkari	141	2005/2006 season (70%)	58	0	0	0	0
151	ISR	Roman Serov	140	2007/2008 season (100%)	0	0	0	0	0
151	ISR	Roman Serov	140	2006/2007 season (100%)	0	0	0	0	0
151	ISR	Roman Serov	140	2005/2006 season (70%)	140	0	0	0	0
151	NZL	Mathieu Wilson	140	2007/2008 season (100%)	0	0	0	0	0
151	NZL	Mathieu Wilson	140	2006/2007 season (100%)	140	0	0	0	0
151	NZL	Mathieu Wilson	140	2005/2006 season (70%)	0	0	0	0	0
153	AUS	Bradley Santer	134	2007/2008 season (100%)	0	0	0	0	0
153	AUS	Bradley Santer	134	2006/2007 season (100%)	0	0	0	0	0
153	AUS	Bradley Santer	134	2005/2006 season (70%)	134	0	0	0	0
154	FRA	Benjamin Chauvineau	133	2007/2008 season (100%)	0	0	0	0	0
154	FRA	Benjamin Chauvineau	133	2006/2007 season (100%)	0	133	0	0	0
154	FRA	Benjamin Chauvineau	133	2005/2006 season (70%)	0	0	0	0	0
154	CAN	Dave Ferland	133	2007/2008 season (100%)	0	133	0	0	0
154	CAN	Dave Ferland	133	2006/2007 season (100%)	0	0	0	0	0
154	CAN	Dave Ferland	133	2005/2006 season (70%)	0	0	0	0	0
154	ESP	Manuel Legaz	133	2007/2008 season (100%)	0	0	0	0	0
154	ESP	Manuel Legaz	133	2006/2007 season (100%)	0	133	0	0	0
154	ESP	Manuel Legaz	133	2005/2006 season (70%)	0	0	0	0	0
157	UKR	Vitali Danilchenko	127	2007/2008 season (100%)	0	0	0	0	0
157	UKR	Vitali Danilchenko	127	2006/2007 season (100%)	0	0	0	0	0
157	UKR	Vitali Danilchenko	127	2005/2006 season (70%)	0	0	0	127	0
157	PRK	Jong In Han	127	2007/2008 season (100%)	0	0	0	0	0
157	PRK	Jong In Han	127	2006/2007 season (100%)	0	0	0	0	0
157	PRK	Jong In Han	127	2005/2006 season (70%)	0	0	0	127	0
159	BRA	Kevin Alves	126	2007/2008 season (100%)	126	0	0	0	0
159	BRA	Kevin Alves	126	2006/2007 season (100%)	0	0	0	0	0
159	BRA	Kevin Alves	126	2005/2006 season (70%)	0	0	0	0	0
160	CAN	Andrei Rogozine	120	2007/2008 season (100%)	0	120	0	0	0
160	CAN	Andrei Rogozine	120	2006/2007 season (100%)	0	0	0	0	0
160	CAN	Andrei Rogozine	120	2005/2006 season (70%)	0	0	0	0	0
161	CZE	Tomas Janecko	115	2007/2008 season (100%)	0	0	0	0	0
161	CZE	Tomas Janecko	115	2006/2007 season (100%)	0	0	0	0	0
161	CZE	Tomas Janecko	115	2005/2006 season (70%)	0	115	0	0	0
162	AUS	Dean Timmins	113	2007/2008 season (100%)	0	0	0	0	0
162	AUS	Dean Timmins	113	2006/2007 season (100%)	113	0	0	0	0
162	AUS	Dean Timmins	113	2005/2006 season (70%)	0	0	0	0	0
163	CZE	Petr Bidar	108	2007/2008 season (100%)	0	108	0	0	0
163	CZE	Petr Bidar	108	2006/2007 season (100%)	0	0	0	0	0
163	CZE	Petr Bidar	108	2005/2006 season (70%)	0	0	0	0	0
163	FRA	Alexandre Briancon	108	2007/2008 season (100%)	0	0	0	0	0
163	FRA	Alexandre Briancon	108	2006/2007 season (100%)	0	108	0	0	0
163	FRA	Alexandre Briancon	108	2005/2006 season (70%)	0	0	0	0	0
163	GBR	Elliot Hilton	108	2007/2008 season (100%)	0	108	0	0	0
163	GBR	Elliot Hilton	108	2006/2007 season (100%)	0	0	0	0	0
163	GBR	Elliot Hilton	108	2005/2006 season (70%)	0	0	0	0	0
163	JPN	Takuya Kondoh	108	2007/2008 season (100%)	0	108	0	0	0
163	JPN	Takuya Kondoh	108	2006/2007 season (100%)	0	0	0	0	0
163	JPN	Takuya Kondoh	108	2005/2006 season (70%)	0	0	0	0	0
163	FRA	Bruno Massot	108	2007/2008 season (100%)	0	0	0	0	0
163	FRA	Bruno Massot	108	2006/2007 season (100%)	0	108	0	0	0
163	FRA	Bruno Massot	108	2005/2006 season (70%)	0	0	0	0	0
163	AZE	Danil Privalov	108	2007/2008 season (100%)	0	0	0	0	0
163	AZE	Danil Privalov	108	2006/2007 season (100%)	0	108	0	0	0
163	AZE	Danil Privalov	108	2005/2006 season (70%)	0	0	0	0	0
169	CAN	Maxime-Billy Fortin	104	2007/2008 season (100%)	0	0	0	0	0
169	CAN	Maxime-Billy Fortin	104	2006/2007 season (100%)	0	0	0	0	0
169	CAN	Maxime-Billy Fortin	104	2005/2006 season (70%)	0	104	0	0	0
170	MEX	Adrian Alvarado	102	2007/2008 season (100%)	0	0	0	0	0
170	MEX	Adrian Alvarado	102	2006/2007 season (100%)	102	0	0	0	0
170	MEX	Adrian Alvarado	102	2005/2006 season (70%)	0	0	0	0	0
170	POL	Konstantin Tupikov	102	2007/2008 season (100%)	102	0	0	0	0
170	POL	Konstantin Tupikov	102	2006/2007 season (100%)	0	0	0	0	0
170	POL	Konstantin Tupikov	102	2005/2006 season (70%)	0	0	0	0	0
172	GER	Marcel Kotzian	97	2007/2008 season (100%)	0	0	0	0	0
172	GER	Marcel Kotzian	97	2006/2007 season (100%)	0	97	0	0	0
172	GER	Marcel Kotzian	97	2005/2006 season (70%)	0	0	0	0	0
172	RUS	Stanislav Kovalev	97	2007/2008 season (100%)	0	0	0	0	0
172	RUS	Stanislav Kovalev	97	2006/2007 season (100%)	0	97	0	0	0
172	RUS	Stanislav Kovalev	97	2005/2006 season (70%)	0	0	0	0	0
172	JPN	Kento Nakamura	97	2007/2008 season (100%)	0	97	0	0	0
172	JPN	Kento Nakamura	97	2006/2007 season (100%)	0	0	0	0	0
172	JPN	Kento Nakamura	97	2005/2006 season (70%)	0	0	0	0	0
172	POL	Edwin Siwkowski	97	2007/2008 season (100%)	0	0	0	0	0
172	POL	Edwin Siwkowski	97	2006/2007 season (100%)	0	97	0	0	0
172	POL	Edwin Siwkowski	97	2005/2006 season (70%)	0	0	0	0	0
172	GER	Franz Streubel	97	2007/2008 season (100%)	0	97	0	0	0
172	GER	Franz Streubel	97	2006/2007 season (100%)	0	0	0	0	0
172	GER	Franz Streubel	97	2005/2006 season (70%)	0	0	0	0	0
177	USA	Jordan Brauninger	93	2007/2008 season (100%)	0	0	0	0	0
177	USA	Jordan Brauninger	93	2006/2007 season (100%)	0	0	0	0	0
177	USA	Jordan Brauninger	93	2005/2006 season (70%)	0	93	0	0	0
177	CHN	Lei Wang	93	2007/2008 season (100%)	0	0	0	0	0
177	CHN	Lei Wang	93	2006/2007 season (100%)	0	0	0	0	0
177	CHN	Lei Wang	93	2005/2006 season (70%)	0	93	0	0	0
179	CRO	Boris Martinec	92	2007/2008 season (100%)	0	0	0	0	0
179	CRO	Boris Martinec	92	2006/2007 season (100%)	92	0	0	0	0
179	CRO	Boris Martinec	92	2005/2006 season (70%)	0	0	0	0	0
180	MEX	Miguel Angel Moyron	79	2007/2008 season (100%)	0	0	0	0	0
180	MEX	Miguel Angel Moyron	79	2006/2007 season (100%)	0	0	0	0	0
180	MEX	Miguel Angel Moyron	79	2005/2006 season (70%)	79	0	0	0	0
181	GER	Denis Wieczorek	78	2007/2008 season (100%)	78	0	0	0	0
181	GER	Denis Wieczorek	78	2006/2007 season (100%)	0	0	0	0	0
181	GER	Denis Wieczorek	78	2005/2006 season (70%)	0	0	0	0	0
182	CRO	Josip Gluhak	74	2007/2008 season (100%)	74	0	0	0	0
182	CRO	Josip Gluhak	74	2006/2007 season (100%)	0	0	0	0	0
182	CRO	Josip Gluhak	74	2005/2006 season (70%)	0	0	0	0	0
182	ISR	Sergei Kotov	74	2007/2008 season (100%)	0	0	0	0	0
182	ISR	Sergei Kotov	74	2006/2007 season (100%)	74	0	0	0	0
182	ISR	Sergei Kotov	74	2005/2006 season (70%)	0	0	0	0	0
182	HUN	Zoltan Toth	74	2007/2008 season (100%)	0	0	0	0	0
182	HUN	Zoltan Toth	74	2006/2007 season (100%)	0	0	0	0	0
182	HUN	Zoltan Toth	74	2005/2006 season (70%)	74	0	0	0	0
182	SRB	Trifun Živanovic	74	2007/2008 season (100%)	0	0	0	0	0
182	SRB	Trifun Živanovic	74	2006/2007 season (100%)	0	0	0	0	0
182	SRB	Trifun Živanovic	74	2005/2006 season (70%)	74	0	0	0	0
186	NOR	Michael Chrolenko	70	2007/2008 season (100%)	0	0	0	0	0
186	NOR	Michael Chrolenko	70	2006/2007 season (100%)	70	0	0	0	0
186	NOR	Michael Chrolenko	70	2005/2006 season (70%)	0	0	0	0	0
187	CAN	Jamie Forsythe	68	2007/2008 season (100%)	0	0	0	0	0
187	CAN	Jamie Forsythe	68	2006/2007 season (100%)	0	0	0	0	0
187	CAN	Jamie Forsythe	68	2005/2006 season (70%)	0	68	0	0	0
187	ESP	Juan Legaz	68	2007/2008 season (100%)	0	0	0	0	0
187	ESP	Juan Legaz	68	2006/2007 season (100%)	0	0	0	0	0
187	ESP	Juan Legaz	68	2005/2006 season (70%)	0	68	0	0	0
189	SLO	Luka Cadez	61	2007/2008 season (100%)	0	0	0	0	0
189	SLO	Luka Cadez	61	2006/2007 season (100%)	0	0	0	0	0
189	SLO	Luka Cadez	61	2005/2006 season (70%)	61	0	0	0	0
190	RSA	Gareth Echardt	58	2007/2008 season (100%)	0	0	0	0	0
190	RSA	Gareth Echardt	58	2006/2007 season (100%)	0	0	0	0	0
190	RSA	Gareth Echardt	58	2005/2006 season (70%)	58	0	0	0	0
191	POL	Mateusz Chruscinski	55	2007/2008 season (100%)	0	0	0	0	0
191	POL	Mateusz Chruscinski	55	2006/2007 season (100%)	0	0	0	0	0
191	POL	Mateusz Chruscinski	55	2005/2006 season (70%)	55	0	0	0	0
192	RSA	Konrad Giering	52	2007/2008 season (100%)	0	0	0	0	0
192	RSA	Konrad Giering	52	2006/2007 season (100%)	0	0	0	0	0
192	RSA	Konrad Giering	52	2005/2006 season (70%)	52	0	0	0	0
193	GBR	David Richardson	49	2007/2008 season (100%)	0	0	0	0	0
193	GBR	David Richardson	49	2006/2007 season (100%)	0	0	0	0	0
193	GBR	David Richardson	49	2005/2006 season (70%)	49	0	0	0	0

==== Ladies' singles (212 skaters) ====
As of 20 March 2008

Rank	Nation	Skater	Points	Season	ISU Championships or Olympics	(Junior) Grand Prix and Final		Selected International Competition	
Rank	Nation	Skater	Points	Season	Best	Best	2nd Best	Best	2nd Best
1	JPN	Mao Asada	4680	2007/2008 season (100%)	1200	720	400	0	0
1	JPN	Mao Asada	4680	2006/2007 season (100%)	1080	720	400	0	0
1	JPN	Mao Asada	4680	2005/2006 season (70%)	451	560	280	0	0
2	KOR	Yuna Kim	4364	2007/2008 season (100%)	972	800	400	0	0
2	KOR	Yuna Kim	4364	2006/2007 season (100%)	972	800	400	0	0
2	KOR	Yuna Kim	4364	2005/2006 season (70%)	501	420	175	0	0
3	ITA	Carolina Kostner	3735	2007/2008 season (100%)	1080	648	400	250	203
3	ITA	Carolina Kostner	3735	2006/2007 season (100%)	840	0	0	0	0
3	ITA	Carolina Kostner	3735	2005/2006 season (70%)	476	165	149	0	0
4	JPN	Miki Ando	3573	2007/2008 season (100%)	680	360	292	0	0
4	JPN	Miki Ando	3573	2006/2007 season (100%)	1200	525	400	0	0
4	JPN	Miki Ando	3573	2005/2006 season (70%)	193	408	252	0	0
5	JPN	Yukari Nakano	3361	2007/2008 season (100%)	875	525	360	0	0
5	JPN	Yukari Nakano	3361	2006/2007 season (100%)	787	360	324	0	0
5	JPN	Yukari Nakano	3361	2005/2006 season (70%)	551	454	280	0	0
6	SUI	Sarah Meier	3327	2007/2008 season (100%)	756	360	292	0	0
6	SUI	Sarah Meier	3327	2006/2007 season (100%)	756	648	400	0	0
6	SUI	Sarah Meier	3327	2005/2006 season (70%)	496	183	149	115	0
7	USA	Kimmie Meissner	3271	2007/2008 season (100%)	638	472	400	0	0
7	USA	Kimmie Meissner	3271	2006/2007 season (100%)	875	360	324	0	0
7	USA	Kimmie Meissner	3271	2005/2006 season (70%)	840	183	183	0	0
8	USA	Caroline Zhang	3152	2007/2008 season (100%)	644	583	360	0	0
8	USA	Caroline Zhang	3152	2006/2007 season (100%)	715	600	250	0	0
8	USA	Caroline Zhang	3152	2005/2006 season (70%)	0	0	0	0	0
9	HUN	Júlia Sebestyén	3128	2007/2008 season (100%)	612	262	213	250	164
9	HUN	Júlia Sebestyén	3128	2006/2007 season (100%)	377	472	400	203	0
9	HUN	Júlia Sebestyén	3128	2005/2006 season (70%)	150	165	134	175	0
10	CAN	Joannie Rochette	2807	2007/2008 season (100%)	787	324	324	0	0
10	CAN	Joannie Rochette	2807	2006/2007 season (100%)	680	400	292	0	0
10	CAN	Joannie Rochette	2807	2005/2006 season (70%)	551	252	204	0	0
11	FIN	Kiira Korpi	2753	2007/2008 season (100%)	551	292	0	225	164
11	FIN	Kiira Korpi	2753	2006/2007 season (100%)	680	236	213	250	0
11	FIN	Kiira Korpi	2753	2005/2006 season (70%)	347	142	93	0	0
12	JPN	Fumie Suguri	2578	2007/2008 season (100%)	325	292	262	0	0
12	JPN	Fumie Suguri	2578	2006/2007 season (100%)	0	583	360	0	0
12	JPN	Fumie Suguri	2578	2005/2006 season (70%)	756	252	134	0	0
13	RUS	Elena Sokolova	2387	2007/2008 season (100%)	0	0	0	0	0
13	RUS	Elena Sokolova	2387	2006/2007 season (100%)	446	292	213	0	0
13	RUS	Elena Sokolova	2387	2005/2006 season (70%)	613	368	280	175	0
14	USA	Emily Hughes	2373	2007/2008 season (100%)	0	292	292	0	0
14	USA	Emily Hughes	2373	2006/2007 season (100%)	756	324	262	0	0
14	USA	Emily Hughes	2373	2005/2006 season (70%)	447	183	183	0	0
15	USA	Ashley Wagner	2357	2007/2008 season (100%)	402	324	262	0	0
15	USA	Ashley Wagner	2357	2006/2007 season (100%)	579	540	250	0	0
15	USA	Ashley Wagner	2357	2005/2006 season (70%)	0	0	0	0	0
16	FIN	Susanna Pöykiö	2343	2007/2008 season (100%)	0	191	0	225	0
16	FIN	Susanna Pöykiö	2343	2006/2007 season (100%)	612	262	262	225	0
16	FIN	Susanna Pöykiö	2343	2005/2006 season (70%)	362	204	0	0	0
17	USA	Beatrisa Liang	2327	2007/2008 season (100%)	465	236	191	0	0
17	USA	Beatrisa Liang	2327	2006/2007 season (100%)	0	292	262	250	0
17	USA	Beatrisa Liang	2327	2005/2006 season (70%)	476	204	0	142	0
18	FIN	Laura Lepisto	2226	2007/2008 season (100%)	680	262	213	203	182
18	FIN	Laura Lepisto	2226	2006/2007 season (100%)	380	164	0	0	0
18	FIN	Laura Lepisto	2226	2005/2006 season (70%)	216	142	127	0	0
19	FIN	Jenni Vähämaa	2172	2007/2008 season (100%)	521	394	225	250	0
19	FIN	Jenni Vähämaa	2172	2006/2007 season (100%)	521	164	97	0	0
19	FIN	Jenni Vähämaa	2172	2005/2006 season (70%)	239	0	0	0	0
20	USA	Alissa Czisny	2142	2007/2008 season (100%)	0	236	0	0	0
20	USA	Alissa Czisny	2142	2006/2007 season (100%)	551	292	0	0	0
20	USA	Alissa Czisny	2142	2005/2006 season (70%)	295	330	280	158	0
21	USA	Mirai Nagasu	2073	2007/2008 season (100%)	579	600	250	0	0
21	USA	Mirai Nagasu	2073	2006/2007 season (100%)	644	0	0	0	0
21	USA	Mirai Nagasu	2073	2005/2006 season (70%)	0	0	0	0	0
22	GEO	Elene Gedevanishvili	2050	2007/2008 season (100%)	446	236	191	0	0
22	GEO	Elene Gedevanishvili	2050	2006/2007 season (100%)	402	0	0	250	0
22	GEO	Elene Gedevanishvili	2050	2005/2006 season (70%)	386	223	175	127	0
23	JPN	Aki Sawada	1946	2007/2008 season (100%)	0	0	0	0	0
23	JPN	Aki Sawada	1946	2006/2007 season (100%)	612	262	191	0	0
23	JPN	Aki Sawada	1946	2005/2006 season (70%)	328	378	175	0	0
24	JPN	Nana Takeda	1877	2007/2008 season (100%)	0	324	236	0	0
24	JPN	Nana Takeda	1877	2006/2007 season (100%)	308	394	250	0	0
24	JPN	Nana Takeda	1877	2005/2006 season (70%)	365	158	127	0	0
25	CAN	Mira Leung	1766	2007/2008 season (100%)	551	262	262	0	0
25	CAN	Mira Leung	1766	2006/2007 season (100%)	106	236	191	0	0
25	CAN	Mira Leung	1766	2005/2006 season (70%)	264	165	165	0	0
26	EST	Elena Glebova	1754	2007/2008 season (100%)	275	236	191	0	0
26	EST	Elena Glebova	1754	2006/2007 season (100%)	422	203	148	164	0
26	EST	Elena Glebova	1754	2005/2006 season (70%)	174	104	0	115	0
27	ITA	Valentina Marchei	1715	2007/2008 season (100%)	496	0	0	250	0
27	ITA	Valentina Marchei	1715	2006/2007 season (100%)	551	236	0	182	0
27	ITA	Valentina Marchei	1715	2005/2006 season (70%)	88	0	0	0	0
28	CHN	Binshu Xu	1620	2007/2008 season (100%)	237	0	0	0	0
28	CHN	Binshu Xu	1620	2006/2007 season (100%)	402	292	191	0	0
28	CHN	Binshu Xu	1620	2005/2006 season (70%)	0	340	158	0	0
29	JPN	Rumi Suizu	1534	2007/2008 season (100%)	147	203	203	0	0
29	JPN	Rumi Suizu	1534	2006/2007 season (100%)	469	287	225	0	0
29	JPN	Rumi Suizu	1534	2005/2006 season (70%)	0	115	115	0	0
30	USA	Rachael Flatt	1505	2007/2008 season (100%)	715	540	250	0	0
30	USA	Rachael Flatt	1505	2006/2007 season (100%)	0	0	0	0	0
30	USA	Rachael Flatt	1505	2005/2006 season (70%)	0	0	0	0	0
31	CAN	Lesley Hawker	1405	2007/2008 season (100%)	0	213	0	0	0
31	CAN	Lesley Hawker	1405	2006/2007 season (100%)	446	191	0	0	0
31	CAN	Lesley Hawker	1405	2005/2006 season (70%)	428	0	0	127	0
32	ITA	Stefania Berton	1374	2007/2008 season (100%)	237	148	133	0	0
32	ITA	Stefania Berton	1374	2006/2007 season (100%)	277	354	225	0	0
32	ITA	Stefania Berton	1374	2005/2006 season (70%)	0	76	0	0	0
33	FIN	Alisa Drei	1320	2007/2008 season (100%)	0	0	0	0	0
33	FIN	Alisa Drei	1320	2006/2007 season (100%)	496	0	0	203	182
33	FIN	Alisa Drei	1320	2005/2006 season (70%)	281	0	0	158	0
34	JPN	Mai Asada	1286	2007/2008 season (100%)	0	191	0	0	0
34	JPN	Mai Asada	1286	2006/2007 season (100%)	0	236	236	0	0
34	JPN	Mai Asada	1286	2005/2006 season (70%)	347	276	175	0	0
34	RUS	Arina Martinova	1286	2007/2008 season (100%)	0	0	0	0	0
34	RUS	Arina Martinova	1286	2006/2007 season (100%)	247	213	213	225	0
34	RUS	Arina Martinova	1286	2005/2006 season (70%)	157	127	104	0	0
34	USA	Christine Zukowski	1286	2007/2008 season (100%)	0	0	0	0	0
34	USA	Christine Zukowski	1286	2006/2007 season (100%)	0	262	213	0	0
34	USA	Christine Zukowski	1286	2005/2006 season (70%)	405	248	158	0	0
37	KOR	Na-Young Kim	1255	2007/2008 season (100%)	612	203	0	0	0
37	KOR	Na-Young Kim	1255	2006/2007 season (100%)	237	203	0	0	0
37	KOR	Na-Young Kim	1255	2005/2006 season (70%)	0	0	0	0	0
37	USA	Katy Taylor	1255	2007/2008 season (100%)	0	0	0	0	0
37	USA	Katy Taylor	1255	2006/2007 season (100%)	0	0	0	203	0
37	USA	Katy Taylor	1255	2005/2006 season (70%)	588	306	158	0	0
39	CHN	Yan Liu	1236	2007/2008 season (100%)	214	0	0	0	0
39	CHN	Yan Liu	1236	2006/2007 season (100%)	362	0	0	0	0
39	CHN	Yan Liu	1236	2005/2006 season (70%)	312	204	183	175	0
40	JPN	Yuki Nishino	1205	2007/2008 season (100%)	469	486	250	0	0
40	JPN	Yuki Nishino	1205	2006/2007 season (100%)	0	0	0	0	0
40	JPN	Yuki Nishino	1205	2005/2006 season (70%)	0	0	0	0	0
41	HUN	Viktória Pavuk	1203	2007/2008 season (100%)	0	213	0	250	0
41	HUN	Viktória Pavuk	1203	2006/2007 season (100%)	140	0	0	250	0
41	HUN	Viktória Pavuk	1203	2005/2006 season (70%)	185	165	0	0	0
42	TUR	Tuğba Karademir	1134	2007/2008 season (100%)	293	0	0	225	164
42	TUR	Tuğba Karademir	1134	2006/2007 season (100%)	325	0	0	0	0
42	TUR	Tuğba Karademir	1134	2005/2006 season (70%)	166	0	0	127	0
43	CAN	Myriane Samson	1088	2007/2008 season (100%)	277	164	164	0	0
43	CAN	Myriane Samson	1088	2006/2007 season (100%)	119	182	182	0	0
43	CAN	Myriane Samson	1088	2005/2006 season (70%)	0	93	0	0	0
44	GER	Annette Dytrt	1070	2007/2008 season (100%)	377	0	0	182	0
44	GER	Annette Dytrt	1070	2006/2007 season (100%)	0	0	0	0	0
44	GER	Annette Dytrt	1070	2005/2006 season (70%)	228	149	134	0	0
45	CHN	Dan Fang	1057	2007/2008 season (100%)	0	213	0	0	0
45	CHN	Dan Fang	1057	2006/2007 season (100%)	325	236	0	0	0
45	CHN	Dan Fang	1057	2005/2006 season (70%)	134	149	0	0	0
46	RUS	Alena Leonova	1035	2007/2008 season (100%)	422	225	164	0	0
46	RUS	Alena Leonova	1035	2006/2007 season (100%)	224	0	0	0	0
46	RUS	Alena Leonova	1035	2005/2006 season (70%)	0	0	0	0	0
47	USA	Sasha Cohen	1008	2007/2008 season (100%)	0	0	0	0	0
47	USA	Sasha Cohen	1008	2006/2007 season (100%)	0	0	0	0	0
47	USA	Sasha Cohen	1008	2005/2006 season (70%)	756	252	0	0	0
48	ESP	Sonia Lafuente	998	2007/2008 season (100%)	224	203	0	0	0
48	ESP	Sonia Lafuente	998	2006/2007 season (100%)	182	225	164	0	0
48	ESP	Sonia Lafuente	998	2005/2006 season (70%)	0	0	0	0	0
49	EST	Svetlana Issakova	917	2007/2008 season (100%)	0	319	225	0	0
49	EST	Svetlana Issakova	917	2006/2007 season (100%)	0	225	148	0	0
49	EST	Svetlana Issakova	917	2005/2006 season (70%)	0	0	0	0	0
50	USA	Megan Oster	894	2007/2008 season (100%)	0	0	0	0	0
50	USA	Megan Oster	894	2006/2007 season (100%)	0	486	250	0	0
50	USA	Megan Oster	894	2005/2006 season (70%)	0	158	0	0	0
51	USA	Juliana Cannarozzo	893	2007/2008 season (100%)	0	182	0	0	0
51	USA	Juliana Cannarozzo	893	2006/2007 season (100%)	0	319	250	0	0
51	USA	Juliana Cannarozzo	893	2005/2006 season (70%)	0	142	142	0	0
52	RUS	Katarina Gerboldt	869	2007/2008 season (100%)	308	0	0	203	0
52	RUS	Katarina Gerboldt	869	2006/2007 season (100%)	0	0	0	164	0
52	RUS	Katarina Gerboldt	869	2005/2006 season (70%)	194	0	0	0	0
52	SWE	Viktoria Helgesson	869	2007/2008 season (100%)	200	182	120	164	0
52	SWE	Viktoria Helgesson	869	2006/2007 season (100%)	0	0	0	203	0
52	SWE	Viktoria Helgesson	869	2005/2006 season (70%)	0	0	0	0	0
54	JPN	Satsuki Muramoto	857	2007/2008 season (100%)	0	225	133	0	0
54	JPN	Satsuki Muramoto	857	2006/2007 season (100%)	249	182	0	0	0
54	JPN	Satsuki Muramoto	857	2005/2006 season (70%)	0	68	0	0	0
55	CZE	Nella Simaova	831	2007/2008 season (100%)	192	133	97	0	0
55	CZE	Nella Simaova	831	2006/2007 season (100%)	0	0	0	250	0
55	CZE	Nella Simaova	831	2005/2006 season (70%)	83	76	0	0	0
56	NED	Karen Venhuizen	828	2007/2008 season (100%)	214	0	0	182	0
56	NED	Karen Venhuizen	828	2006/2007 season (100%)	0	0	0	250	182
56	NED	Karen Venhuizen	828	2005/2006 season (70%)	0	0	0	0	0
57	USA	Melissa Bulanhagui	826	2007/2008 season (100%)	0	164	0	0	0
57	USA	Melissa Bulanhagui	826	2006/2007 season (100%)	0	437	225	0	0
57	USA	Melissa Bulanhagui	826	2005/2006 season (70%)	0	0	0	0	0
58	KOR	Ji Eun Choi	820	2007/2008 season (100%)	0	0	0	0	0
58	KOR	Ji Eun Choi	820	2006/2007 season (100%)	97	203	182	0	0
58	KOR	Ji Eun Choi	820	2005/2006 season (70%)	166	104	68	0	0
59	KOR	Yea-Ji Shin	805	2007/2008 season (100%)	0	0	0	0	0
59	KOR	Yea-Ji Shin	805	2006/2007 season (100%)	342	203	133	0	0
59	KOR	Yea-Ji Shin	805	2005/2006 season (70%)	127	0	0	0	0
60	GBR	Jenna McCorkell	797	2007/2008 season (100%)	402	0	0	203	0
60	GBR	Jenna McCorkell	797	2006/2007 season (100%)	192	0	0	0	0
60	GBR	Jenna McCorkell	797	2005/2006 season (70%)	0	0	0	0	0
61	UZB	Anastasia Gimazetdinova	775	2007/2008 season (100%)	362	0	0	0	0
61	UZB	Anastasia Gimazetdinova	775	2006/2007 season (100%)	264	0	0	0	0
61	UZB	Anastasia Gimazetdinova	775	2005/2006 season (70%)	102	149	0	0	0
62	SWE	Joshi Helgesson	769	2007/2008 season (100%)	380	148	133	0	0
62	SWE	Joshi Helgesson	769	2006/2007 season (100%)	0	108	0	0	0
62	SWE	Joshi Helgesson	769	2005/2006 season (70%)	0	0	0	0	0
63	ISR	Tamar Katz	743	2007/2008 season (100%)	173	108	0	0	0
63	ISR	Tamar Katz	743	2006/2007 season (100%)	237	0	0	225	0
63	ISR	Tamar Katz	743	2005/2006 season (70%)	0	0	0	0	0
64	JPN	Akiko Kitamura	737	2007/2008 season (100%)	0	0	0	0	0
64	JPN	Akiko Kitamura	737	2006/2007 season (100%)	0	108	0	0	0
64	JPN	Akiko Kitamura	737	2005/2006 season (70%)	253	201	175	0	0
65	KOR	Chae-Hwa Kim	722	2007/2008 season (100%)	173	0	0	0	0
65	KOR	Chae-Hwa Kim	722	2006/2007 season (100%)	214	0	0	0	0
65	KOR	Chae-Hwa Kim	722	2005/2006 season (70%)	266	127	115	0	0
66	POL	Anna Jurkiewicz	668	2007/2008 season (100%)	126	0	0	225	225
66	POL	Anna Jurkiewicz	668	2006/2007 season (100%)	92	0	0	0	0
66	POL	Anna Jurkiewicz	668	2005/2006 season (70%)	0	0	0	0	0
67	USA	Kristine Musademba	662	2007/2008 season (100%)	0	437	225	0	0
67	USA	Kristine Musademba	662	2006/2007 season (100%)	0	0	0	0	0
67	USA	Kristine Musademba	662	2005/2006 season (70%)	0	0	0	0	0
68	USA	Katrina Hacker	660	2007/2008 season (100%)	496	0	0	0	0
68	USA	Katrina Hacker	660	2006/2007 season (100%)	0	164	0	0	0
68	USA	Katrina Hacker	660	2005/2006 season (70%)	0	0	0	0	0
69	CAN	Cynthia Phaneuf	638	2007/2008 season (100%)	446	0	0	0	0
69	CAN	Cynthia Phaneuf	638	2006/2007 season (100%)	192	0	0	0	0
69	CAN	Cynthia Phaneuf	638	2005/2006 season (70%)	0	0	0	0	0
70	SWE	Lina Johansson	612	2007/2008 season (100%)	0	0	0	0	0
70	SWE	Lina Johansson	612	2006/2007 season (100%)	214	0	0	182	164
70	SWE	Lina Johansson	612	2005/2006 season (70%)	52	0	0	0	0
71	RUS	Alexandra Ievleva	610	2007/2008 season (100%)	0	213	0	0	0
71	RUS	Alexandra Ievleva	610	2006/2007 season (100%)	293	0	0	0	0
71	RUS	Alexandra Ievleva	610	2005/2006 season (70%)	0	104	0	0	0
72	RUS	Ekaterina Kozireva	601	2007/2008 season (100%)	0	108	108	0	0
72	RUS	Ekaterina Kozireva	601	2006/2007 season (100%)	0	203	182	0	0
72	RUS	Ekaterina Kozireva	601	2005/2006 season (70%)	0	0	0	0	0
73	ROU	Roxana Luca	600	2007/2008 season (100%)	92	0	0	203	203
73	ROU	Roxana Luca	600	2006/2007 season (100%)	102	0	0	0	0
73	ROU	Roxana Luca	600	2005/2006 season (70%)	0	0	0	0	0
74	RUS	Ksenia Doronina	594	2007/2008 season (100%)	362	0	0	0	0
74	RUS	Ksenia Doronina	594	2006/2007 season (100%)	0	148	0	0	0
74	RUS	Ksenia Doronina	594	2005/2006 season (70%)	0	84	0	0	0
75	GER	Sarah Hecken	592	2007/2008 season (100%)	342	250	0	0	0
75	GER	Sarah Hecken	592	2006/2007 season (100%)	0	0	0	0	0
75	GER	Sarah Hecken	592	2005/2006 season (70%)	0	0	0	0	0
75	USA	Megan Hyatt	592	2007/2008 season (100%)	0	0	0	0	0
75	USA	Megan Hyatt	592	2006/2007 season (100%)	0	225	133	0	0
75	USA	Megan Hyatt	592	2005/2006 season (70%)	141	93	0	0	0
77	UKR	Elena Liashenko	586	2007/2008 season (100%)	0	0	0	0	0
77	UKR	Elena Liashenko	586	2006/2007 season (100%)	0	0	0	0	0
77	UKR	Elena Liashenko	586	2005/2006 season (70%)	155	227	204	0	0
78	USA	Alexe Gilles	579	2007/2008 season (100%)	0	354	225	0	0
78	USA	Alexe Gilles	579	2006/2007 season (100%)	0	0	0	0	0
78	USA	Alexe Gilles	579	2005/2006 season (70%)	0	0	0	0	0
78	RUS	Jana Smekhnova	579	2007/2008 season (100%)	0	203	148	0	0
78	RUS	Jana Smekhnova	579	2006/2007 season (100%)	0	120	108	0	0
78	RUS	Jana Smekhnova	579	2005/2006 season (70%)	0	0	0	0	0
80	KOR	Na-Hee Sin	568	2007/2008 season (100%)	132	164	0	0	0
80	KOR	Na-Hee Sin	568	2006/2007 season (100%)	0	164	108	0	0
80	KOR	Na-Hee Sin	568	2005/2006 season (70%)	0	0	0	0	0
81	EST	Olga Ikonnikova	540	2007/2008 season (100%)	74	120	0	182	0
81	EST	Olga Ikonnikova	540	2006/2007 season (100%)	0	0	0	164	0
81	EST	Olga Ikonnikova	540	2005/2006 season (70%)	0	0	0	0	0
82	USA	Chrissy Hughes	537	2007/2008 season (100%)	0	287	250	0	0
82	USA	Chrissy Hughes	537	2006/2007 season (100%)	0	0	0	0	0
82	USA	Chrissy Hughes	537	2005/2006 season (70%)	0	0	0	0	0
83	RUS	Nina Petushkova	525	2007/2008 season (100%)	156	236	0	0	0
83	RUS	Nina Petushkova	525	2006/2007 season (100%)	0	133	0	0	0
83	RUS	Nina Petushkova	525	2005/2006 season (70%)	0	0	0	0	0
84	USA	Blake Rosenthal	506	2007/2008 season (100%)	0	225	148	0	0
84	USA	Blake Rosenthal	506	2006/2007 season (100%)	0	133	0	0	0
84	USA	Blake Rosenthal	506	2005/2006 season (70%)	0	0	0	0	0
85	JPN	Akiko Suzuki	500	2007/2008 season (100%)	0	0	0	250	250
85	JPN	Akiko Suzuki	500	2006/2007 season (100%)	0	0	0	0	0
85	JPN	Akiko Suzuki	500	2005/2006 season (70%)	0	0	0	0	0
86	FIN	Sofia Otala	489	2007/2008 season (100%)	97	164	108	0	0
86	FIN	Sofia Otala	489	2006/2007 season (100%)	0	120	0	0	0
86	FIN	Sofia Otala	489	2005/2006 season (70%)	0	0	0	0	0
87	SVK	Radka Bartova	461	2007/2008 season (100%)	0	0	0	0	0
87	SVK	Radka Bartova	461	2006/2007 season (100%)	83	120	0	203	0
87	SVK	Radka Bartova	461	2005/2006 season (70%)	55	0	0	0	0
88	AUS	Joanne Carter	454	2007/2008 season (100%)	0	0	0	0	0
88	AUS	Joanne Carter	454	2006/2007 season (100%)	173	0	0	0	0
88	AUS	Joanne Carter	454	2005/2006 season (70%)	281	0	0	0	0
89	FRA	Laura Dutertre	451	2007/2008 season (100%)	0	0	0	0	0
89	FRA	Laura Dutertre	451	2006/2007 season (100%)	0	108	108	0	0
89	FRA	Laura Dutertre	451	2005/2006 season (70%)	0	142	93	0	0
90	JPN	Yuka Ishikawa	450	2007/2008 season (100%)	0	182	120	0	0
90	JPN	Yuka Ishikawa	450	2006/2007 season (100%)	0	148	0	0	0
90	JPN	Yuka Ishikawa	450	2005/2006 season (70%)	0	0	0	0	0
91	RUS	Viktoria Volchkova	444	2007/2008 season (100%)	0	0	0	0	0
91	RUS	Viktoria Volchkova	444	2006/2007 season (100%)	0	191	0	0	0
91	RUS	Viktoria Volchkova	444	2005/2006 season (70%)	253	0	0	0	0
92	JPN	Haruka Inoue	443	2007/2008 season (100%)	0	0	0	0	0
92	JPN	Haruka Inoue	443	2006/2007 season (100%)	0	164	0	0	0
92	JPN	Haruka Inoue	443	2005/2006 season (70%)	0	175	104	0	0
93	SLO	Teodora Postic	425	2007/2008 season (100%)	0	0	0	182	164
93	SLO	Teodora Postic	425	2006/2007 season (100%)	0	0	0	0	0
93	SLO	Teodora Postic	425	2005/2006 season (70%)	79	0	0	0	0
93	SVK	Ivana Reitmayerova	425	2007/2008 season (100%)	164	97	0	164	0
93	SVK	Ivana Reitmayerova	425	2006/2007 season (100%)	0	0	0	0	0
93	SVK	Ivana Reitmayerova	425	2005/2006 season (70%)	0	0	0	0	0
95	SWE	Linnea Mellgren	421	2007/2008 season (100%)	0	148	0	0	0
95	SWE	Linnea Mellgren	421	2006/2007 season (100%)	0	108	97	0	0
95	SWE	Linnea Mellgren	421	2005/2006 season (70%)	0	68	0	0	0
96	MEX	Loretta Hamui	412	2007/2008 season (100%)	156	108	0	0	0
96	MEX	Loretta Hamui	412	2006/2007 season (100%)	0	148	0	0	0
96	MEX	Loretta Hamui	412	2005/2006 season (70%)	0	0	0	0	0
97	FIN	Henriikka Hietaniemi	407	2007/2008 season (100%)	0	0	0	0	0
97	FIN	Henriikka Hietaniemi	407	2006/2007 season (100%)	0	0	0	225	182
97	FIN	Henriikka Hietaniemi	407	2005/2006 season (70%)	0	0	0	0	0
98	FRA	Vinciane Fortin	399	2007/2008 season (100%)	0	0	0	0	0
98	FRA	Vinciane Fortin	399	2006/2007 season (100%)	0	182	133	0	0
98	FRA	Vinciane Fortin	399	2005/2006 season (70%)	0	84	0	0	0
99	CAN	Amelie Lacoste	396	2007/2008 season (100%)	0	0	0	0	0
99	CAN	Amelie Lacoste	396	2006/2007 season (100%)	0	0	0	0	0
99	CAN	Amelie Lacoste	396	2005/2006 season (70%)	205	115	76	0	0
100	MEX	Michele Cantu	395	2007/2008 season (100%)	0	0	0	182	0
100	MEX	Michele Cantu	395	2006/2007 season (100%)	92	0	0	0	0
100	MEX	Michele Cantu	395	2005/2006 season (70%)	121	0	0	0	0
101	JPN	Mutsumi Takayama	393	2007/2008 season (100%)	0	0	0	0	0
101	JPN	Mutsumi Takayama	393	2006/2007 season (100%)	0	182	0	0	0
101	JPN	Mutsumi Takayama	393	2005/2006 season (70%)	0	127	84	0	0
102	AUT	Kathrin Freudelsperger	389	2007/2008 season (100%)	0	0	0	0	0
102	AUT	Kathrin Freudelsperger	389	2006/2007 season (100%)	0	0	0	225	164
102	AUT	Kathrin Freudelsperger	389	2005/2006 season (70%)	0	0	0	0	0
103	CAN	Meagan Duhamel	386	2007/2008 season (100%)	0	0	0	0	0
103	CAN	Meagan Duhamel	386	2006/2007 season (100%)	0	0	0	0	0
103	CAN	Meagan Duhamel	386	2005/2006 season (70%)	386	0	0	0	0
104	AUT	Kerstin Frank	385	2007/2008 season (100%)	0	0	0	182	0
104	AUT	Kerstin Frank	385	2006/2007 season (100%)	70	133	0	0	0
104	AUT	Kerstin Frank	385	2005/2006 season (70%)	0	0	0	0	0
104	BUL	Hristina Vassileva	385	2007/2008 season (100%)	0	0	0	203	182
104	BUL	Hristina Vassileva	385	2006/2007 season (100%)	0	0	0	0	0
104	BUL	Hristina Vassileva	385	2005/2006 season (70%)	0	0	0	0	0
106	CRO	Idora Hegel	378	2007/2008 season (100%)	0	0	0	0	0
106	CRO	Idora Hegel	378	2006/2007 season (100%)	173	0	0	0	0
106	CRO	Idora Hegel	378	2005/2006 season (70%)	205	0	0	0	0
107	FRA	Julie Cagnon	377	2007/2008 season (100%)	0	133	97	0	0
107	FRA	Julie Cagnon	377	2006/2007 season (100%)	147	0	0	0	0
107	FRA	Julie Cagnon	377	2005/2006 season (70%)	0	0	0	0	0
108	AUT	Miriam Ziegler	375	2007/2008 season (100%)	107	148	120	0	0
108	AUT	Miriam Ziegler	375	2006/2007 season (100%)	0	0	0	0	0
108	AUT	Miriam Ziegler	375	2005/2006 season (70%)	0	0	0	0	0
109	SUI	Bettina Heim	367	2007/2008 season (100%)	0	0	0	0	0
109	SUI	Bettina Heim	367	2006/2007 season (100%)	107	148	0	0	0
109	SUI	Bettina Heim	367	2005/2006 season (70%)	44	68	0	0	0
110	JPN	Ayane Nakamura	364	2007/2008 season (100%)	0	182	182	0	0
110	JPN	Ayane Nakamura	364	2006/2007 season (100%)	0	0	0	0	0
110	JPN	Ayane Nakamura	364	2005/2006 season (70%)	0	0	0	0	0
111	GER	Katharina Gierok	358	2007/2008 season (100%)	0	108	0	250	0
111	GER	Katharina Gierok	358	2006/2007 season (100%)	0	0	0	0	0
111	GER	Katharina Gierok	358	2005/2006 season (70%)	0	0	0	0	0
111	UKR	Irina Movchan	358	2007/2008 season (100%)	0	0	0	164	0
111	UKR	Irina Movchan	358	2006/2007 season (100%)	74	120	0	0	0
111	UKR	Irina Movchan	358	2005/2006 season (70%)	0	0	0	0	0
113	FRA	Gwendoline Didier	355	2007/2008 season (100%)	0	191	0	164	0
113	FRA	Gwendoline Didier	355	2006/2007 season (100%)	0	0	0	0	0
113	FRA	Gwendoline Didier	355	2005/2006 season (70%)	0	0	0	0	0
114	FRA	Anne Sophie Calvez	347	2007/2008 season (100%)	0	0	0	0	0
114	FRA	Anne Sophie Calvez	347	2006/2007 season (100%)	156	191	0	0	0
114	FRA	Anne Sophie Calvez	347	2005/2006 season (70%)	0	0	0	0	0
115	BUL	Sonia Radeva	346	2007/2008 season (100%)	0	0	0	225	0
115	BUL	Sonia Radeva	346	2006/2007 season (100%)	0	0	0	0	0
115	BUL	Sonia Radeva	346	2005/2006 season (70%)	121	0	0	0	0
116	USA	Danielle Kahle	340	2007/2008 season (100%)	0	0	0	0	0
116	USA	Danielle Kahle	340	2006/2007 season (100%)	0	0	0	225	0
116	USA	Danielle Kahle	340	2005/2006 season (70%)	0	115	0	0	0
116	USA	Megan Williams Stewart	340	2007/2008 season (100%)	0	0	0	225	0
116	USA	Megan Williams Stewart	340	2006/2007 season (100%)	0	0	0	0	0
116	USA	Megan Williams Stewart	340	2005/2006 season (70%)	0	115	0	0	0
118	RUS	Veronika Kropotina	333	2007/2008 season (100%)	0	0	0	0	0
118	RUS	Veronika Kropotina	333	2006/2007 season (100%)	0	0	0	0	0
118	RUS	Veronika Kropotina	333	2005/2006 season (70%)	0	175	158	0	0
119	JPN	Shoko Ishikawa	328	2007/2008 season (100%)	0	164	0	0	0
119	JPN	Shoko Ishikawa	328	2006/2007 season (100%)	0	164	0	0	0
119	JPN	Shoko Ishikawa	328	2005/2006 season (70%)	0	0	0	0	0
120	GBR	Vanessa James	323	2007/2008 season (100%)	0	0	0	203	0
120	GBR	Vanessa James	323	2006/2007 season (100%)	0	120	0	0	0
120	GBR	Vanessa James	323	2005/2006 season (70%)	0	0	0	0	0
121	CAN	Diane Szmiett	317	2007/2008 season (100%)	0	108	0	0	0
121	CAN	Diane Szmiett	317	2006/2007 season (100%)	0	148	0	0	0
121	CAN	Diane Szmiett	317	2005/2006 season (70%)	61	0	0	0	0
122	PUR	Victoria Muniz	297	2007/2008 season (100%)	0	0	0	0	0
122	PUR	Victoria Muniz	297	2006/2007 season (100%)	132	97	0	0	0
122	PUR	Victoria Muniz	297	2005/2006 season (70%)	0	68	0	0	0
123	MEX	Ana Cecilia Cantu	296	2007/2008 season (100%)	140	0	0	0	0
123	MEX	Ana Cecilia Cantu	296	2006/2007 season (100%)	156	0	0	0	0
123	MEX	Ana Cecilia Cantu	296	2005/2006 season (70%)	98	0	0	0	0
124	KOR	Hyeon-Jeong Kim	290	2007/2008 season (100%)	182	108	0	0	0
124	KOR	Hyeon-Jeong Kim	290	2006/2007 season (100%)	0	0	0	0	0
124	KOR	Hyeon-Jeong Kim	290	2005/2006 season (70%)	0	0	0	0	0
124	GER	Kristin Wieczorek	290	2007/2008 season (100%)	0	0	0	0	0
124	GER	Kristin Wieczorek	290	2006/2007 season (100%)	126	0	0	164	0
124	GER	Kristin Wieczorek	290	2005/2006 season (70%)	0	0	0	0	0
126	SUI	Viviane Käser	286	2007/2008 season (100%)	83	0	0	0	0
126	SUI	Viviane Käser	286	2006/2007 season (100%)	0	0	0	203	0
126	SUI	Viviane Käser	286	2005/2006 season (70%)	0	0	0	0	0
127	AUT	Astrid Mangi	279	2007/2008 season (100%)	0	0	0	0	0
127	AUT	Astrid Mangi	279	2006/2007 season (100%)	0	108	0	0	0
127	AUT	Astrid Mangi	279	2005/2006 season (70%)	103	68	0	0	0
128	GER	Isabel Drescher	268	2007/2008 season (100%)	0	148	120	0	0
128	GER	Isabel Drescher	268	2006/2007 season (100%)	0	0	0	0	0
128	GER	Isabel Drescher	268	2005/2006 season (70%)	0	0	0	0	0
129	CHN	Yueren Wang	264	2007/2008 season (100%)	264	0	0	0	0
129	CHN	Yueren Wang	264	2006/2007 season (100%)	0	0	0	0	0
129	CHN	Yueren Wang	264	2005/2006 season (70%)	0	0	0	0	0
130	FRA	Chloe Depouilly	250	2007/2008 season (100%)	0	0	0	250	0
130	FRA	Chloe Depouilly	250	2006/2007 season (100%)	0	0	0	0	0
130	FRA	Chloe Depouilly	250	2005/2006 season (70%)	0	0	0	0	0
131	CAN	Kathryn Kang	248	2007/2008 season (100%)	0	133	0	0	0
131	CAN	Kathryn Kang	248	2006/2007 season (100%)	0	0	0	0	0
131	CAN	Kathryn Kang	248	2005/2006 season (70%)	0	115	0	0	0
131	USA	Molly Oberstar	248	2007/2008 season (100%)	0	0	0	0	0
131	USA	Molly Oberstar	248	2006/2007 season (100%)	0	133	0	0	0
131	USA	Molly Oberstar	248	2005/2006 season (70%)	0	115	0	0	0
133	UKR	Galina Efremenko	247	2007/2008 season (100%)	0	0	0	0	0
133	UKR	Galina Efremenko	247	2006/2007 season (100%)	0	0	0	0	0
133	UKR	Galina Efremenko	247	2005/2006 season (70%)	113	134	0	0	0
134	AUS	Cheltzie Lee	234	2007/2008 season (100%)	70	164	0	0	0
134	AUS	Cheltzie Lee	234	2006/2007 season (100%)	0	0	0	0	0
134	AUS	Cheltzie Lee	234	2005/2006 season (70%)	0	0	0	0	0
135	USA	Michelle Boulos	225	2007/2008 season (100%)	0	0	0	225	0
135	USA	Michelle Boulos	225	2006/2007 season (100%)	0	0	0	0	0
135	USA	Michelle Boulos	225	2005/2006 season (70%)	0	0	0	0	0
135	GER	Mira Sonnenberg	225	2007/2008 season (100%)	0	0	0	225	0
135	GER	Mira Sonnenberg	225	2006/2007 season (100%)	0	0	0	0	0
135	GER	Mira Sonnenberg	225	2005/2006 season (70%)	0	0	0	0	0
137	MEX	Emily Naphtal	219	2007/2008 season (100%)	0	0	0	0	0
137	MEX	Emily Naphtal	219	2006/2007 season (100%)	140	0	0	0	0
137	MEX	Emily Naphtal	219	2005/2006 season (70%)	79	0	0	0	0
138	LUX	Fleur Maxwell	216	2007/2008 season (100%)	0	0	0	0	0
138	LUX	Fleur Maxwell	216	2006/2007 season (100%)	0	0	0	0	0
138	LUX	Fleur Maxwell	216	2005/2006 season (70%)	74	0	0	142	0
139	NZL	Alexandra Rout	211	2007/2008 season (100%)	78	133	0	0	0
139	NZL	Alexandra Rout	211	2006/2007 season (100%)	0	0	0	0	0
139	NZL	Alexandra Rout	211	2005/2006 season (70%)	0	0	0	0	0
140	USA	Becky Bereswill	203	2007/2008 season (100%)	0	0	0	203	0
140	USA	Becky Bereswill	203	2006/2007 season (100%)	0	0	0	0	0
140	USA	Becky Bereswill	203	2005/2006 season (70%)	0	0	0	0	0
140	USA	Angela Maxwell	203	2007/2008 season (100%)	0	203	0	0	0
140	USA	Angela Maxwell	203	2006/2007 season (100%)	0	0	0	0	0
140	USA	Angela Maxwell	203	2005/2006 season (70%)	0	0	0	0	0
140	THA	Charissa Tansomboon	203	2007/2008 season (100%)	83	120	0	0	0
140	THA	Charissa Tansomboon	203	2006/2007 season (100%)	0	0	0	0	0
140	THA	Charissa Tansomboon	203	2005/2006 season (70%)	0	0	0	0	0
140	RUS	Margarita Tertichnaia	203	2007/2008 season (100%)	0	0	0	0	0
140	RUS	Margarita Tertichnaia	203	2006/2007 season (100%)	0	203	0	0	0
140	RUS	Margarita Tertichnaia	203	2005/2006 season (70%)	0	0	0	0	0
144	HUN	Katherine Hadford	199	2007/2008 season (100%)	102	0	0	0	0
144	HUN	Katherine Hadford	199	2006/2007 season (100%)	0	97	0	0	0
144	HUN	Katherine Hadford	199	2005/2006 season (70%)	0	0	0	0	0
145	GER	Christiane Berger	197	2007/2008 season (100%)	0	0	0	0	0
145	GER	Christiane Berger	197	2006/2007 season (100%)	113	0	0	0	0
145	GER	Christiane Berger	197	2005/2006 season (70%)	0	84	0	0	0
146	FIN	Stina Keränen	194	2007/2008 season (100%)	0	97	0	0	0
146	FIN	Stina Keränen	194	2006/2007 season (100%)	0	97	0	0	0
146	FIN	Stina Keränen	194	2005/2006 season (70%)	0	0	0	0	0
147	TPE	Melinda Sherilyn Wang	192	2007/2008 season (100%)	192	0	0	0	0
147	TPE	Melinda Sherilyn Wang	192	2006/2007 season (100%)	0	0	0	0	0
147	TPE	Melinda Sherilyn Wang	192	2005/2006 season (70%)	0	0	0	0	0
148	RUS	Valeria Vorobieva	186	2007/2008 season (100%)	0	0	0	0	0
148	RUS	Valeria Vorobieva	186	2006/2007 season (100%)	0	0	0	0	0
148	RUS	Valeria Vorobieva	186	2005/2006 season (70%)	0	93	93	0	0
148	NED	Martine Zuiderwijk	186	2007/2008 season (100%)	0	0	0	0	0
148	NED	Martine Zuiderwijk	186	2006/2007 season (100%)	0	0	0	0	0
148	NED	Martine Zuiderwijk	186	2005/2006 season (70%)	71	0	0	115	0
150	AUS	Miriam Manzano	185	2007/2008 season (100%)	0	0	0	0	0
150	AUS	Miriam Manzano	185	2006/2007 season (100%)	0	0	0	0	0
150	AUS	Miriam Manzano	185	2005/2006 season (70%)	185	0	0	0	0
151	CAN	Charlotte Belair	182	2007/2008 season (100%)	0	182	0	0	0
151	CAN	Charlotte Belair	182	2006/2007 season (100%)	0	0	0	0	0
151	CAN	Charlotte Belair	182	2005/2006 season (70%)	0	0	0	0	0
151	CAN	Amanda Billings	182	2007/2008 season (100%)	0	0	0	0	0
151	CAN	Amanda Billings	182	2006/2007 season (100%)	0	0	0	182	0
151	CAN	Amanda Billings	182	2005/2006 season (70%)	0	0	0	0	0
151	JPN	Yukina Ohta	182	2007/2008 season (100%)	0	0	0	182	0
151	JPN	Yukina Ohta	182	2006/2007 season (100%)	0	0	0	0	0
151	JPN	Yukina Ohta	182	2005/2006 season (70%)	0	0	0	0	0
154	TPE	Jennie Lee	175	2007/2008 season (100%)	0	0	0	0	0
154	TPE	Jennie Lee	175	2006/2007 season (100%)	78	97	0	0	0
154	TPE	Jennie Lee	175	2005/2006 season (70%)	0	0	0	0	0
155	GER	Denise Zimmermann	169	2007/2008 season (100%)	0	0	0	0	0
155	GER	Denise Zimmermann	169	2006/2007 season (100%)	0	0	0	0	0
155	GER	Denise Zimmermann	169	2005/2006 season (70%)	0	93	76	0	0
156	GER	Jessica Hujsl	164	2007/2008 season (100%)	0	0	0	164	0
156	GER	Jessica Hujsl	164	2006/2007 season (100%)	0	0	0	0	0
156	GER	Jessica Hujsl	164	2005/2006 season (70%)	0	0	0	0	0
156	JPN	Risa Mochizuki	164	2007/2008 season (100%)	0	0	0	0	0
156	JPN	Risa Mochizuki	164	2006/2007 season (100%)	0	164	0	0	0
156	JPN	Risa Mochizuki	164	2005/2006 season (70%)	0	0	0	0	0
158	PRK	Yong Suk Kim	158	2007/2008 season (100%)	0	0	0	0	0
158	PRK	Yong Suk Kim	158	2006/2007 season (100%)	0	0	0	0	0
158	PRK	Yong Suk Kim	158	2005/2006 season (70%)	0	0	0	158	0
159	SWE	Amanda Nylander	155	2007/2008 season (100%)	0	0	0	0	0
159	SWE	Amanda Nylander	155	2006/2007 season (100%)	0	0	0	0	0
159	SWE	Amanda Nylander	155	2005/2006 season (70%)	155	0	0	0	0
160	GER	Constanze Paulinus	149	2007/2008 season (100%)	0	0	0	0	0
160	GER	Constanze Paulinus	149	2006/2007 season (100%)	0	0	0	0	0
160	GER	Constanze Paulinus	149	2005/2006 season (70%)	0	149	0	0	0
161	ITA	Nicole Della Monica	148	2007/2008 season (100%)	0	0	0	0	0
161	ITA	Nicole Della Monica	148	2006/2007 season (100%)	0	148	0	0	0
161	ITA	Nicole Della Monica	148	2005/2006 season (70%)	0	0	0	0	0
161	JPN	Nanoha Sato	148	2007/2008 season (100%)	0	148	0	0	0
161	JPN	Nanoha Sato	148	2006/2007 season (100%)	0	0	0	0	0
161	JPN	Nanoha Sato	148	2005/2006 season (70%)	0	0	0	0	0
163	CHN	Na Hou	134	2007/2008 season (100%)	0	0	0	0	0
163	CHN	Na Hou	134	2006/2007 season (100%)	0	0	0	0	0
163	CHN	Na Hou	134	2005/2006 season (70%)	0	134	0	0	0
164	USA	Carolyn Ann Alba	133	2007/2008 season (100%)	0	133	0	0	0
164	USA	Carolyn Ann Alba	133	2006/2007 season (100%)	0	0	0	0	0
164	USA	Carolyn Ann Alba	133	2005/2006 season (70%)	0	0	0	0	0
164	KOR	Soo-Hyun Kim	133	2007/2008 season (100%)	0	0	0	0	0
164	KOR	Soo-Hyun Kim	133	2006/2007 season (100%)	0	133	0	0	0
164	KOR	Soo-Hyun Kim	133	2005/2006 season (70%)	0	0	0	0	0
166	USA	Danielle Shepard	127	2007/2008 season (100%)	0	0	0	0	0
166	USA	Danielle Shepard	127	2006/2007 season (100%)	0	0	0	0	0
166	USA	Danielle Shepard	127	2005/2006 season (70%)	0	127	0	0	0
167	TPE	Jocelyn Ho	126	2007/2008 season (100%)	0	0	0	0	0
167	TPE	Jocelyn Ho	126	2006/2007 season (100%)	126	0	0	0	0
167	TPE	Jocelyn Ho	126	2005/2006 season (70%)	0	0	0	0	0
167	AUS	Tina Wang	126	2007/2008 season (100%)	126	0	0	0	0
167	AUS	Tina Wang	126	2006/2007 season (100%)	0	0	0	0	0
167	AUS	Tina Wang	126	2005/2006 season (70%)	0	0	0	0	0
169	ITA	Marcella De Trovato	120	2007/2008 season (100%)	0	0	0	0	0
169	ITA	Marcella De Trovato	120	2006/2007 season (100%)	0	120	0	0	0
169	ITA	Marcella De Trovato	120	2005/2006 season (70%)	0	0	0	0	0
169	FRA	Caroline Delome Sensat	120	2007/2008 season (100%)	0	120	0	0	0
169	FRA	Caroline Delome Sensat	120	2006/2007 season (100%)	0	0	0	0	0
169	FRA	Caroline Delome Sensat	120	2005/2006 season (70%)	0	0	0	0	0
169	CAN	Rika Inoda	120	2007/2008 season (100%)	0	120	0	0	0
169	CAN	Rika Inoda	120	2006/2007 season (100%)	0	0	0	0	0
169	CAN	Rika Inoda	120	2005/2006 season (70%)	0	0	0	0	0
169	CAN	Devon Neuls	120	2007/2008 season (100%)	0	0	0	0	0
169	CAN	Devon Neuls	120	2006/2007 season (100%)	0	120	0	0	0
169	CAN	Devon Neuls	120	2005/2006 season (70%)	0	0	0	0	0
169	CAN	Erika Tisluck	120	2007/2008 season (100%)	0	0	0	0	0
169	CAN	Erika Tisluck	120	2006/2007 season (100%)	0	120	0	0	0
169	CAN	Erika Tisluck	120	2005/2006 season (70%)	0	0	0	0	0
174	UKR	Eleonora Vinnichenko	119	2007/2008 season (100%)	119	0	0	0	0
174	UKR	Eleonora Vinnichenko	119	2006/2007 season (100%)	0	0	0	0	0
174	UKR	Eleonora Vinnichenko	119	2005/2006 season (70%)	0	0	0	0	0
175	RSA	Lejeanne Marais	113	2007/2008 season (100%)	113	0	0	0	0
175	RSA	Lejeanne Marais	113	2006/2007 season (100%)	0	0	0	0	0
175	RSA	Lejeanne Marais	113	2005/2006 season (70%)	0	0	0	0	0
175	IND	Ami Parekh	113	2007/2008 season (100%)	0	0	0	0	0
175	IND	Ami Parekh	113	2006/2007 season (100%)	113	0	0	0	0
175	IND	Ami Parekh	113	2005/2006 season (70%)	0	0	0	0	0
177	FRA	Nadege Bobillier	109	2007/2008 season (100%)	0	0	0	0	0
177	FRA	Nadege Bobillier	109	2006/2007 season (100%)	0	0	0	0	0
177	FRA	Nadege Bobillier	109	2005/2006 season (70%)	109	0	0	0	0
178	SUI	Cindy Carquillat	104	2007/2008 season (100%)	0	0	0	0	0
178	SUI	Cindy Carquillat	104	2006/2007 season (100%)	0	0	0	0	0
178	SUI	Cindy Carquillat	104	2005/2006 season (70%)	0	104	0	0	0
178	FRA	Charlotte Gendreau	104	2007/2008 season (100%)	0	0	0	0	0
178	FRA	Charlotte Gendreau	104	2006/2007 season (100%)	0	0	0	0	0
178	FRA	Charlotte Gendreau	104	2005/2006 season (70%)	0	104	0	0	0
178	JPN	Miri Yoshida	104	2007/2008 season (100%)	0	0	0	0	0
178	JPN	Miri Yoshida	104	2006/2007 season (100%)	0	0	0	0	0
178	JPN	Miri Yoshida	104	2005/2006 season (70%)	0	104	0	0	0
181	AUS	Phoebe Di Tommaso	102	2007/2008 season (100%)	0	0	0	0	0
181	AUS	Phoebe Di Tommaso	102	2006/2007 season (100%)	102	0	0	0	0
181	AUS	Phoebe Di Tommaso	102	2005/2006 season (70%)	0	0	0	0	0
181	HKG	Tamami Ono	102	2007/2008 season (100%)	102	0	0	0	0
181	HKG	Tamami Ono	102	2006/2007 season (100%)	0	0	0	0	0
181	HKG	Tamami Ono	102	2005/2006 season (70%)	0	0	0	0	0
183	AUT	Andrea Kreuzer	98	2007/2008 season (100%)	0	0	0	0	0
183	AUT	Andrea Kreuzer	98	2006/2007 season (100%)	0	0	0	0	0
183	AUT	Andrea Kreuzer	98	2005/2006 season (70%)	98	0	0	0	0
184	TPE	Colleen Burkhead	97	2007/2008 season (100%)	0	0	0	0	0
184	TPE	Colleen Burkhead	97	2006/2007 season (100%)	0	97	0	0	0
184	TPE	Colleen Burkhead	97	2005/2006 season (70%)	0	0	0	0	0
184	NOR	Erle Harstad	97	2007/2008 season (100%)	0	97	0	0	0
184	NOR	Erle Harstad	97	2006/2007 season (100%)	0	0	0	0	0
184	NOR	Erle Harstad	97	2005/2006 season (70%)	0	0	0	0	0
184	GER	Isabel Heintges	97	2007/2008 season (100%)	0	97	0	0	0
184	GER	Isabel Heintges	97	2006/2007 season (100%)	0	0	0	0	0
184	GER	Isabel Heintges	97	2005/2006 season (70%)	0	0	0	0	0
184	KOR	Min-Jung Kwak	97	2007/2008 season (100%)	0	97	0	0	0
184	KOR	Min-Jung Kwak	97	2006/2007 season (100%)	0	0	0	0	0
184	KOR	Min-Jung Kwak	97	2005/2006 season (70%)	0	0	0	0	0
184	JPN	Yurina Nobuhara	97	2007/2008 season (100%)	0	97	0	0	0
184	JPN	Yurina Nobuhara	97	2006/2007 season (100%)	0	0	0	0	0
184	JPN	Yurina Nobuhara	97	2005/2006 season (70%)	0	0	0	0	0
184	ISR	Jenna Syken	97	2007/2008 season (100%)	0	0	0	0	0
184	ISR	Jenna Syken	97	2006/2007 season (100%)	0	97	0	0	0
184	ISR	Jenna Syken	97	2005/2006 season (70%)	0	0	0	0	0
190	ITA	Federica Constantini	93	2007/2008 season (100%)	0	0	0	0	0
190	ITA	Federica Constantini	93	2006/2007 season (100%)	0	0	0	0	0
190	ITA	Federica Constantini	93	2005/2006 season (70%)	0	93	0	0	0
191	PHI	Gracielle Jeanne Tan	92	2007/2008 season (100%)	92	0	0	0	0
191	PHI	Gracielle Jeanne Tan	92	2006/2007 season (100%)	0	0	0	0	0
191	PHI	Gracielle Jeanne Tan	92	2005/2006 season (70%)	0	0	0	0	0
192	THA	Tammy Sutan	88	2007/2008 season (100%)	0	0	0	0	0
192	THA	Tammy Sutan	88	2006/2007 season (100%)	0	0	0	0	0
192	THA	Tammy Sutan	88	2005/2006 season (70%)	88	0	0	0	0
193	CHN	Bingwa Geng	87	2007/2008 season (100%)	87	0	0	0	0
193	CHN	Bingwa Geng	87	2006/2007 season (100%)	0	0	0	0	0
193	CHN	Bingwa Geng	87	2005/2006 season (70%)	0	0	0	0	0
193	BLR	Julia Sheremet	87	2007/2008 season (100%)	0	0	0	0	0
193	BLR	Julia Sheremet	87	2006/2007 season (100%)	87	0	0	0	0
193	BLR	Julia Sheremet	87	2005/2006 season (70%)	0	0	0	0	0
195	CHN	Yalu Guo	84	2007/2008 season (100%)	0	0	0	0	0
195	CHN	Yalu Guo	84	2006/2007 season (100%)	0	0	0	0	0
195	CHN	Yalu Guo	84	2005/2006 season (70%)	0	84	0	0	0
195	RUS	Ekaterina Lobanova	84	2007/2008 season (100%)	0	0	0	0	0
195	RUS	Ekaterina Lobanova	84	2006/2007 season (100%)	0	0	0	0	0
195	RUS	Ekaterina Lobanova	84	2005/2006 season (70%)	0	84	0	0	0
195	USA	Tenile Victorsen	84	2007/2008 season (100%)	0	0	0	0	0
195	USA	Tenile Victorsen	84	2006/2007 season (100%)	0	0	0	0	0
195	USA	Tenile Victorsen	84	2005/2006 season (70%)	0	84	0	0	0
198	RSA	Abigail Pietersen	83	2007/2008 season (100%)	0	0	0	0	0
198	RSA	Abigail Pietersen	83	2006/2007 season (100%)	83	0	0	0	0
198	RSA	Abigail Pietersen	83	2005/2006 season (70%)	0	0	0	0	0
199	FRA	Adeline Canac	76	2007/2008 season (100%)	0	0	0	0	0
199	FRA	Adeline Canac	76	2006/2007 season (100%)	0	0	0	0	0
199	FRA	Adeline Canac	76	2005/2006 season (70%)	0	76	0	0	0
199	CAN	Signe Ronka	76	2007/2008 season (100%)	0	0	0	0	0
199	CAN	Signe Ronka	76	2006/2007 season (100%)	0	0	0	0	0
199	CAN	Signe Ronka	76	2005/2006 season (70%)	0	76	0	0	0
199	CAN	Erin Scherrer	76	2007/2008 season (100%)	0	0	0	0	0
199	CAN	Erin Scherrer	76	2006/2007 season (100%)	0	0	0	0	0
199	CAN	Erin Scherrer	76	2005/2006 season (70%)	0	76	0	0	0
199	CAN	Amanda Valentine	76	2007/2008 season (100%)	0	0	0	0	0
199	CAN	Amanda Valentine	76	2006/2007 season (100%)	0	0	0	0	0
199	CAN	Amanda Valentine	76	2005/2006 season (70%)	0	76	0	0	0
203	SWE	Isabelle Nylander	75	2007/2008 season (100%)	0	0	0	0	0
203	SWE	Isabelle Nylander	75	2006/2007 season (100%)	0	0	0	0	0
203	SWE	Isabelle Nylander	75	2005/2006 season (70%)	75	0	0	0	0
204	MEX	Corenne Bruhns	74	2007/2008 season (100%)	74	0	0	0	0
204	MEX	Corenne Bruhns	74	2006/2007 season (100%)	0	0	0	0	0
204	MEX	Corenne Bruhns	74	2005/2006 season (70%)	0	0	0	0	0
205	TPE	Diane Chen	71	2007/2008 season (100%)	0	0	0	0	0
205	TPE	Diane Chen	71	2006/2007 season (100%)	0	0	0	0	0
205	TPE	Diane Chen	71	2005/2006 season (70%)	71	0	0	0	0
206	RUS	Lilia Biktagirova	68	2007/2008 season (100%)	0	0	0	0	0
206	RUS	Lilia Biktagirova	68	2006/2007 season (100%)	0	0	0	0	0
206	RUS	Lilia Biktagirova	68	2005/2006 season (70%)	0	68	0	0	0
207	AUS	Laura Downing	64	2007/2008 season (100%)	0	0	0	0	0
207	AUS	Laura Downing	64	2006/2007 season (100%)	0	0	0	0	0
207	AUS	Laura Downing	64	2005/2006 season (70%)	64	0	0	0	0
207	UKR	Ekaterina Proyda	64	2007/2008 season (100%)	0	0	0	0	0
207	UKR	Ekaterina Proyda	64	2006/2007 season (100%)	0	0	0	0	0
207	UKR	Ekaterina Proyda	64	2005/2006 season (70%)	64	0	0	0	0
209	GER	Brigitte Blickling	63	2007/2008 season (100%)	0	0	0	0	0
209	GER	Brigitte Blickling	63	2006/2007 season (100%)	63	0	0	0	0
209	GER	Brigitte Blickling	63	2005/2006 season (70%)	0	0	0	0	0
210	RSA	Megan Allely	58	2007/2008 season (100%)	0	0	0	0	0
210	RSA	Megan Allely	58	2006/2007 season (100%)	0	0	0	0	0
210	RSA	Megan Allely	58	2005/2006 season (70%)	58	0	0	0	0
210	SVK	Jacqueline Belenyesiova	58	2007/2008 season (100%)	0	0	0	0	0
210	SVK	Jacqueline Belenyesiova	58	2006/2007 season (100%)	0	0	0	0	0
210	SVK	Jacqueline Belenyesiova	58	2005/2006 season (70%)	58	0	0	0	0
212	POL	Laura Czarnotta	49	2007/2008 season (100%)	0	0	0	0	0
212	POL	Laura Czarnotta	49	2006/2007 season (100%)	0	0	0	0	0
212	POL	Laura Czarnotta	49	2005/2006 season (70%)	49	0	0	0	0

==== Pairs (94 couples) ====
As of 19 March 2008

Rank	Nation	Couple	Points	Season	ISU Championships or Olympics	(Junior) Grand Prix and Final		Selected International Competition	
Rank	Nation	Couple	Points	Season	Best	Best	2nd Best	Best	2nd Best
1	GER	Aliona Savchenko / Robin Szolkowy	4971	2007/2008 season (100%)	1200	800	400	250	0
1	GER	Aliona Savchenko / Robin Szolkowy	4971	2006/2007 season (100%)	972	720	400	0	0
1	GER	Aliona Savchenko / Robin Szolkowy	4971	2005/2006 season (70%)	529	454	280	175	0
2	CHN	Dan Zhang / Hao Zhang	4139	2007/2008 season (100%)	1080	720	400	0	0
2	CHN	Dan Zhang / Hao Zhang	4139	2006/2007 season (100%)	787	648	400	0	0
2	CHN	Dan Zhang / Hao Zhang	4139	2005/2006 season (70%)	756	504	280	0	0
3	CHN	Qing Pang / Jian Tong	3658	2007/2008 season (100%)	840	648	400	0	0
3	CHN	Qing Pang / Jian Tong	3658	2006/2007 season (100%)	1080	360	0	0	0
3	CHN	Qing Pang / Jian Tong	3658	2005/2006 season (70%)	840	330	252	0	0
4	RUS	Maria Petrova / Alexei Tikhonov	2996	2007/2008 season (100%)	0	0	0	0	0
4	RUS	Maria Petrova / Alexei Tikhonov	2996	2006/2007 season (100%)	756	472	400	0	0
4	RUS	Maria Petrova / Alexei Tikhonov	2996	2005/2006 season (70%)	680	408	280	0	0
5	CAN	Jessica Dube / Bryce Davison	2962	2007/2008 season (100%)	972	583	400	0	0
5	CAN	Jessica Dube / Bryce Davison	2962	2006/2007 season (100%)	638	0	0	0	0
5	CAN	Jessica Dube / Bryce Davison	2962	2005/2006 season (70%)	447	204	165	0	0
6	RUS	Ksenia Krasilnikova / Konstantin Bezmaternikh	2886	2007/2008 season (100%)	715	540	262	0	0
6	RUS	Ksenia Krasilnikova / Konstantin Bezmaternikh	2886	2006/2007 season (100%)	579	540	250	0	0
6	RUS	Ksenia Krasilnikova / Konstantin Bezmaternikh	2886	2005/2006 season (70%)	405	158	158	0	0
7	USA	Rena Inoue / John Baldwin	2732	2007/2008 season (100%)	612	0	0	0	0
7	USA	Rena Inoue / John Baldwin	2732	2006/2007 season (100%)	680	583	400	0	0
7	USA	Rena Inoue / John Baldwin	2732	2005/2006 season (70%)	613	252	204	0	0
8	RUS	Yuko Kavaguti / Alexander Smirnov	2565	2007/2008 season (100%)	875	525	324	0	0
8	RUS	Yuko Kavaguti / Alexander Smirnov	2565	2006/2007 season (100%)	517	324	0	0	0
8	RUS	Yuko Kavaguti / Alexander Smirnov	2565	2005/2006 season (70%)	0	0	0	0	0
9	USA	Keauna McLaughlin / Rockne Brubaker	2285	2007/2008 season (100%)	0	360	360	0	0
9	USA	Keauna McLaughlin / Rockne Brubaker	2285	2006/2007 season (100%)	715	600	250	0	0
9	USA	Keauna McLaughlin / Rockne Brubaker	2285	2005/2006 season (70%)	0	0	0	0	0
10	RUS	Maria Mukhortova / Maxim Trankov	2265	2007/2008 season (100%)	756	324	292	0	0
10	RUS	Maria Mukhortova / Maxim Trankov	2265	2006/2007 season (100%)	418	262	213	0	0
10	RUS	Maria Mukhortova / Maxim Trankov	2265	2005/2006 season (70%)	264	204	149	0	0
11	CAN	Anabelle Langlois / Cody Hay	2247	2007/2008 season (100%)	574	292	262	0	0
11	CAN	Anabelle Langlois / Cody Hay	2247	2006/2007 season (100%)	465	292	0	0	0
11	CAN	Anabelle Langlois / Cody Hay	2247	2005/2006 season (70%)	347	204	0	158	0
12	RUS	Julia Obertas / Sergei Slavnov	2220	2007/2008 season (100%)	0	0	0	0	0
12	RUS	Julia Obertas / Sergei Slavnov	2220	2006/2007 season (100%)	612	324	236	0	0
12	RUS	Julia Obertas / Sergei Slavnov	2220	2005/2006 season (70%)	428	368	252	0	0
13	UKR	Tatiana Volosozhar / Stanislav Morozov	2216	2007/2008 season (100%)	612	292	262	0	0
13	UKR	Tatiana Volosozhar / Stanislav Morozov	2216	2006/2007 season (100%)	875	0	0	0	0
13	UKR	Tatiana Volosozhar / Stanislav Morozov	2216	2005/2006 season (70%)	326	0	0	175	0
14	RUS	Vera Bazarova / Yuri Larionov	2112	2007/2008 season (100%)	0	600	324	0	0
14	RUS	Vera Bazarova / Yuri Larionov	2112	2006/2007 season (100%)	644	319	225	0	0
14	RUS	Vera Bazarova / Yuri Larionov	2112	2005/2006 season (70%)	0	0	0	0	0
15	USA	Jessica Rose Paetsch / Jon Nuss	1845	2007/2008 season (100%)	469	437	250	0	0
15	USA	Jessica Rose Paetsch / Jon Nuss	1845	2006/2007 season (100%)	0	486	203	0	0
15	USA	Jessica Rose Paetsch / Jon Nuss	1845	2005/2006 season (70%)	0	0	0	0	0
16	CHN	Jiaqi Li / Jiankun Xu	1781	2007/2008 season (100%)	496	262	236	0	0
16	CHN	Jiaqi Li / Jiankun Xu	1781	2006/2007 season (100%)	277	262	213	0	0
16	CHN	Jiaqi Li / Jiankun Xu	1781	2005/2006 season (70%)	312	0	0	0	0
17	USA	Brooke Castile / Benjamin Okolski	1780	2007/2008 season (100%)	680	0	0	0	0
17	USA	Brooke Castile / Benjamin Okolski	1780	2006/2007 season (100%)	551	0	0	250	0
17	USA	Brooke Castile / Benjamin Okolski	1780	2005/2006 season (70%)	0	165	134	0	0
18	USA	Tiffany Vise / Derek Trent	1760	2007/2008 season (100%)	402	292	262	164	0
18	USA	Tiffany Vise / Derek Trent	1760	2006/2007 season (100%)	0	262	236	0	0
18	USA	Tiffany Vise / Derek Trent	1760	2005/2006 season (70%)	0	0	0	142	0
19	CAN	Amanda Velenosi / Mark Fernandez	1700	2007/2008 season (100%)	308	394	225	0	0
19	CAN	Amanda Velenosi / Mark Fernandez	1700	2006/2007 season (100%)	422	203	148	0	0
19	CAN	Amanda Velenosi / Mark Fernandez	1700	2005/2006 season (70%)	0	0	0	0	0
20	RUS	Tatiana Totmianina / Maxim Marinin	1680	2007/2008 season (100%)	0	0	0	0	0
20	RUS	Tatiana Totmianina / Maxim Marinin	1680	2006/2007 season (100%)	0	0	0	0	0
20	RUS	Tatiana Totmianina / Maxim Marinin	1680	2005/2006 season (70%)	840	560	280	0	0
21	POL	Dominika Piatkowska / Dmitri Khromin	1554	2007/2008 season (100%)	362	213	213	0	0
21	POL	Dominika Piatkowska / Dmitri Khromin	1554	2006/2007 season (100%)	339	236	191	0	0
21	POL	Dominika Piatkowska / Dmitri Khromin	1554	2005/2006 season (70%)	214	0	0	0	0
22	RUS	Ekaterina Sheremetieva / Mikhail Kuznetsov	1542	2007/2008 season (100%)	521	486	250	0	0
22	RUS	Ekaterina Sheremetieva / Mikhail Kuznetsov	1542	2006/2007 season (100%)	0	0	0	0	0
22	RUS	Ekaterina Sheremetieva / Mikhail Kuznetsov	1542	2005/2006 season (70%)	0	158	127	0	0
23	EST	Maria Sergejeva / Ilja Glebov	1492	2007/2008 season (100%)	422	236	213	0	0
23	EST	Maria Sergejeva / Ilja Glebov	1492	2006/2007 season (100%)	380	133	108	0	0
23	EST	Maria Sergejeva / Ilja Glebov	1492	2005/2006 season (70%)	0	0	0	0	0
24	CAN	Elizabeth Putnam / Sean Wirtz	1447	2007/2008 season (100%)	0	0	0	0	0
24	CAN	Elizabeth Putnam / Sean Wirtz	1447	2006/2007 season (100%)	0	292	292	0	0
24	CAN	Elizabeth Putnam / Sean Wirtz	1447	2005/2006 season (70%)	476	204	183	0	0
25	GBR	Stacey Kemp / David King	1406	2007/2008 season (100%)	496	213	191	0	0
25	GBR	Stacey Kemp / David King	1406	2006/2007 season (100%)	293	213	0	0	0
25	GBR	Stacey Kemp / David King	1406	2005/2006 season (70%)	205	0	0	0	0
26	CAN	Jessica Miller / Ian Moram	1324	2007/2008 season (100%)	551	324	236	0	0
26	CAN	Jessica Miller / Ian Moram	1324	2006/2007 season (100%)	0	213	0	0	0
26	CAN	Jessica Miller / Ian Moram	1324	2005/2006 season (70%)	0	0	0	0	0
27	FRA	Adeline Canac / Maximin Coia	1204	2007/2008 season (100%)	305	236	213	0	0
27	FRA	Adeline Canac / Maximin Coia	1204	2006/2007 season (100%)	237	213	0	0	0
27	FRA	Adeline Canac / Maximin Coia	1204	2005/2006 season (70%)	0	0	0	0	0
28	USA	Bianca Butler / Joseph Jacobsen	1173	2007/2008 season (100%)	249	319	182	0	0
28	USA	Bianca Butler / Joseph Jacobsen	1173	2006/2007 season (100%)	0	0	0	0	0
28	USA	Bianca Butler / Joseph Jacobsen	1173	2005/2006 season (70%)	0	248	175	0	0
29	CAN	Meagan Duhamel / Craig Buntin	1170	2007/2008 season (100%)	709	236	0	225	0
29	CAN	Meagan Duhamel / Craig Buntin	1170	2006/2007 season (100%)	0	0	0	0	0
29	CAN	Meagan Duhamel / Craig Buntin	1170	2005/2006 season (70%)	0	0	0	0	0
30	ITA	Laura Magitteri / Ondrej Hotárek	1128	2007/2008 season (100%)	339	236	191	0	0
30	ITA	Laura Magitteri / Ondrej Hotárek	1128	2006/2007 season (100%)	362	0	0	0	0
30	ITA	Laura Magitteri / Ondrej Hotárek	1128	2005/2006 season (70%)	0	0	0	0	0
31	GER	Mari Vartmann / Florian Just	1083	2007/2008 season (100%)	446	0	0	0	0
31	GER	Mari Vartmann / Florian Just	1083	2006/2007 season (100%)	446	191	0	0	0
31	GER	Mari Vartmann / Florian Just	1083	2005/2006 season (70%)	140	0	0	0	0
32	FRA	Marylin Pla / Yannick Bonheur	1010	2007/2008 season (100%)	0	0	0	0	0
32	FRA	Marylin Pla / Yannick Bonheur	1010	2006/2007 season (100%)	402	0	0	0	0
32	FRA	Marylin Pla / Yannick Bonheur	1010	2005/2006 season (70%)	347	134	0	127	0
33	RUS	Arina Ushakova / Sergei Karev	999	2007/2008 season (100%)	551	0	0	0	0
33	RUS	Arina Ushakova / Sergei Karev	999	2006/2007 season (100%)	0	164	120	164	0
33	RUS	Arina Ushakova / Sergei Karev	999	2005/2006 season (70%)	0	0	0	0	0
34	CAN	Carolyn Maccuish / Andrew Evans	968	2007/2008 season (100%)	0	225	120	0	0
34	CAN	Carolyn Maccuish / Andrew Evans	968	2006/2007 season (100%)	342	148	133	0	0
34	CAN	Carolyn Maccuish / Andrew Evans	968	2005/2006 season (70%)	0	0	0	0	0
35	CHN	Yue Zhang / Lei Wang	959	2007/2008 season (100%)	380	292	287	0	0
35	CHN	Yue Zhang / Lei Wang	959	2006/2007 season (100%)	0	0	0	0	0
35	CHN	Yue Zhang / Lei Wang	959	2005/2006 season (70%)	0	0	0	0	0
36	USA	Kaela Pflumm / Christopher Pottenger	934	2007/2008 season (100%)	0	182	133	0	0
36	USA	Kaela Pflumm / Christopher Pottenger	934	2006/2007 season (100%)	0	394	225	0	0
36	USA	Kaela Pflumm / Christopher Pottenger	934	2005/2006 season (70%)	0	0	0	0	0
37	RUS	Elena Efaieva / Alexei Menshikov	836	2007/2008 season (100%)	0	0	0	0	0
37	RUS	Elena Efaieva / Alexei Menshikov	836	2006/2007 season (100%)	496	213	0	0	0
37	RUS	Elena Efaieva / Alexei Menshikov	836	2005/2006 season (70%)	0	0	0	127	0
38	RUS	Elizaveta Levshina / Konstantin Gavrin	831	2007/2008 season (100%)	0	0	0	0	0
38	RUS	Elizaveta Levshina / Konstantin Gavrin	831	2006/2007 season (100%)	308	164	0	0	0
38	RUS	Elizaveta Levshina / Konstantin Gavrin	831	2005/2006 season (70%)	0	201	158	0	0
39	USA	Naomi Nari Nam / Themistocles Leftheris	820	2007/2008 season (100%)	0	0	0	0	0
39	USA	Naomi Nari Nam / Themistocles Leftheris	820	2006/2007 season (100%)	496	324	0	0	0
39	USA	Naomi Nari Nam / Themistocles Leftheris	820	2005/2006 season (70%)	0	0	0	0	0
40	TPE	Amanda Sunyoto-Yang / Darryll Sulindro-Yang	751	2007/2008 season (100%)	202	120	0	0	0
40	TPE	Amanda Sunyoto-Yang / Darryll Sulindro-Yang	751	2006/2007 season (100%)	224	108	97	0	0
40	TPE	Amanda Sunyoto-Yang / Darryll Sulindro-Yang	751	2005/2006 season (70%)	0	0	0	0	0
41	CHN	Huibo Dong / Yiming Wu	712	2007/2008 season (100%)	579	133	0	0	0
41	CHN	Huibo Dong / Yiming Wu	712	2006/2007 season (100%)	0	0	0	0	0
41	CHN	Huibo Dong / Yiming Wu	712	2005/2006 season (70%)	0	0	0	0	0
42	SUI	Anaïs Morand / Antoine Dorsaz	678	2007/2008 season (100%)	224	0	0	0	0
42	SUI	Anaïs Morand / Antoine Dorsaz	678	2006/2007 season (100%)	249	108	97	0	0
42	SUI	Anaïs Morand / Antoine Dorsaz	678	2005/2006 season (70%)	0	0	0	0	0
43	RUS	Lubov Iliushechkina / Nodari Maisuradze	644	2007/2008 season (100%)	644	0	0	0	0
43	RUS	Lubov Iliushechkina / Nodari Maisuradze	644	2006/2007 season (100%)	0	0	0	0	0
43	RUS	Lubov Iliushechkina / Nodari Maisuradze	644	2005/2006 season (70%)	0	0	0	0	0
44	USA	Amanda Evora / Mark Ladwig	629	2007/2008 season (100%)	0	292	0	203	0
44	USA	Amanda Evora / Mark Ladwig	629	2006/2007 season (100%)	0	0	0	0	0
44	USA	Amanda Evora / Mark Ladwig	629	2005/2006 season (70%)	0	134	0	0	0
45	CAN	Mylene Brodeur / John Mattatall	628	2007/2008 season (100%)	446	0	0	0	0
45	CAN	Mylene Brodeur / John Mattatall	628	2006/2007 season (100%)	0	0	0	182	0
45	CAN	Mylene Brodeur / John Mattatall	628	2005/2006 season (70%)	0	0	0	0	0
46	FRA	Melodie Chataigner / Medhi Bouzzine	593	2007/2008 season (100%)	402	0	0	0	0
46	FRA	Melodie Chataigner / Medhi Bouzzine	593	2006/2007 season (100%)	0	191	0	0	0
46	FRA	Melodie Chataigner / Medhi Bouzzine	593	2005/2006 season (70%)	0	0	0	0	0
47	RUS	Anastaisa Khodkova / Pavel Sliusarenko	557	2007/2008 season (100%)	0	354	203	0	0
47	RUS	Anastaisa Khodkova / Pavel Sliusarenko	557	2006/2007 season (100%)	0	0	0	0	0
47	RUS	Anastaisa Khodkova / Pavel Sliusarenko	557	2005/2006 season (70%)	0	0	0	0	0
48	BUL	Rumiana Spassova / Stanimir Todorov	536	2007/2008 season (100%)	0	0	0	0	0
48	BUL	Rumiana Spassova / Stanimir Todorov	536	2006/2007 season (100%)	0	0	0	0	0
48	BUL	Rumiana Spassova / Stanimir Todorov	536	2005/2006 season (70%)	253	149	134	0	0
49	CAN	Valene Maheu / Simon-Pierre Cote	492	2007/2008 season (100%)	0	0	0	0	0
49	CAN	Valene Maheu / Simon-Pierre Cote	492	2006/2007 season (100%)	0	133	120	0	0
49	CAN	Valene Maheu / Simon-Pierre Cote	492	2005/2006 season (70%)	239	0	0	0	0
50	USA	Chelsi Guillen / Danny Curzon	482	2007/2008 season (100%)	277	108	97	0	0
50	USA	Chelsi Guillen / Danny Curzon	482	2006/2007 season (100%)	0	0	0	0	0
50	USA	Chelsi Guillen / Danny Curzon	482	2005/2006 season (70%)	0	0	0	0	0
51	CAN	Monica Pisotta / Michael Stewart	462	2007/2008 season (100%)	342	120	0	0	0
51	CAN	Monica Pisotta / Michael Stewart	462	2006/2007 season (100%)	0	0	0	0	0
51	CAN	Monica Pisotta / Michael Stewart	462	2005/2006 season (70%)	0	0	0	0	0
52	GBR	Sally Hoolin / Jake Bennett	412	2007/2008 season (100%)	0	0	0	0	0
52	GBR	Sally Hoolin / Jake Bennett	412	2006/2007 season (100%)	182	0	0	0	0
52	GBR	Sally Hoolin / Jake Bennett	412	2005/2006 season (70%)	0	115	115	0	0
53	EST	Diana Rennik / Aleksei Saks	399	2007/2008 season (100%)	0	0	0	0	0
53	EST	Diana Rennik / Aleksei Saks	399	2006/2007 season (100%)	214	0	0	0	0
53	EST	Diana Rennik / Aleksei Saks	399	2005/2006 season (70%)	185	0	0	0	0
54	CAN	Olivia Jones / Donald Jackson	383	2007/2008 season (100%)	0	250	133	0	0
54	CAN	Olivia Jones / Donald Jackson	383	2006/2007 season (100%)	0	0	0	0	0
54	CAN	Olivia Jones / Donald Jackson	383	2005/2006 season (70%)	0	0	0	0	0
55	UZB	Marina Aganina / Dmitri Zobnin	362	2007/2008 season (100%)	362	0	0	0	0
55	UZB	Marina Aganina / Dmitri Zobnin	362	2006/2007 season (100%)	0	0	0	0	0
55	UZB	Marina Aganina / Dmitri Zobnin	362	2005/2006 season (70%)	0	0	0	0	0
56	POL	Krystyna Klimczak / Janusz Karweta	349	2007/2008 season (100%)	147	0	0	0	0
56	POL	Krystyna Klimczak / Janusz Karweta	349	2006/2007 season (100%)	202	0	0	0	0
56	POL	Krystyna Klimczak / Janusz Karweta	349	2005/2006 season (70%)	0	0	0	0	0
57	POL	Aneta Michalek / Bartosz Paluchowski	332	2007/2008 season (100%)	0	0	0	0	0
57	POL	Aneta Michalek / Bartosz Paluchowski	332	2006/2007 season (100%)	0	0	0	0	0
57	POL	Aneta Michalek / Bartosz Paluchowski	332	2005/2006 season (70%)	141	115	76	0	0
58	RUS	Lubov Bakirova / Artem Patlasov	330	2007/2008 season (100%)	0	0	0	0	0
58	RUS	Lubov Bakirova / Artem Patlasov	330	2006/2007 season (100%)	0	182	148	0	0
58	RUS	Lubov Bakirova / Artem Patlasov	330	2005/2006 season (70%)	0	0	0	0	0
59	CHN	Ni An / Yiming Wu	326	2007/2008 season (100%)	0	0	0	0	0
59	CHN	Ni An / Yiming Wu	326	2006/2007 season (100%)	0	0	0	0	0
59	CHN	Ni An / Yiming Wu	326	2005/2006 season (70%)	127	115	84	0	0
60	ITA	Marika Zanforlin / Federico Degli Esposti	325	2007/2008 season (100%)	325	0	0	0	0
60	ITA	Marika Zanforlin / Federico Degli Esposti	325	2006/2007 season (100%)	0	0	0	0	0
60	ITA	Marika Zanforlin / Federico Degli Esposti	325	2005/2006 season (70%)	0	0	0	0	0
61	JPN	Narumi Takahashi / Mervin Tran	312	2007/2008 season (100%)	164	148	0	0	0
61	JPN	Narumi Takahashi / Mervin Tran	312	2006/2007 season (100%)	0	0	0	0	0
61	JPN	Narumi Takahashi / Mervin Tran	312	2005/2006 season (70%)	0	0	0	0	0
62	UKR	Julia Goreeva / Roman Talan	301	2007/2008 season (100%)	0	0	0	0	0
62	UKR	Julia Goreeva / Roman Talan	301	2006/2007 season (100%)	0	0	0	0	0
62	UKR	Julia Goreeva / Roman Talan	301	2005/2006 season (70%)	174	127	0	0	0
63	RUS	Victoria Kazantseva / Alexander Enbert	277	2007/2008 season (100%)	0	0	0	0	0
63	RUS	Victoria Kazantseva / Alexander Enbert	277	2006/2007 season (100%)	0	120	0	0	0
63	RUS	Victoria Kazantseva / Alexander Enbert	277	2005/2006 season (70%)	157	0	0	0	0
64	ISR	Ekaterina Sosinova / Fedor Sokolov	264	2007/2008 season (100%)	264	0	0	0	0
64	ISR	Ekaterina Sosinova / Fedor Sokolov	264	2006/2007 season (100%)	0	0	0	0	0
64	ISR	Ekaterina Sosinova / Fedor Sokolov	264	2005/2006 season (70%)	0	0	0	0	0
65	USA	Meeran Trombley / Laureano Ibarra	262	2007/2008 season (100%)	0	262	0	0	0
65	USA	Meeran Trombley / Laureano Ibarra	262	2006/2007 season (100%)	0	0	0	0	0
65	USA	Meeran Trombley / Laureano Ibarra	262	2005/2006 season (70%)	0	0	0	0	0
66	AUS	Emma Brien / Stuart Beckingham	253	2007/2008 season (100%)	0	0	0	0	0
66	AUS	Emma Brien / Stuart Beckingham	253	2006/2007 season (100%)	0	0	0	0	0
66	AUS	Emma Brien / Stuart Beckingham	253	2005/2006 season (70%)	253	0	0	0	0
67	CAN	Sarah McCoy / Aaron Van Cleave	245	2007/2008 season (100%)	0	148	0	0	0
67	CAN	Sarah McCoy / Aaron Van Cleave	245	2006/2007 season (100%)	0	97	0	0	0
67	CAN	Sarah McCoy / Aaron Van Cleave	245	2005/2006 season (70%)	0	0	0	0	0
68	UKR	Ekaterina Kostenko / Roman Talan	237	2007/2008 season (100%)	237	0	0	0	0
68	UKR	Ekaterina Kostenko / Roman Talan	237	2006/2007 season (100%)	0	0	0	0	0
68	UKR	Ekaterina Kostenko / Roman Talan	237	2005/2006 season (70%)	0	0	0	0	0
69	USA	Lilly Pixley / John Salway	235	2007/2008 season (100%)	0	0	0	0	0
69	USA	Lilly Pixley / John Salway	235	2006/2007 season (100%)	0	0	0	0	0
69	USA	Lilly Pixley / John Salway	235	2005/2006 season (70%)	0	142	93	0	0
70	RUS	Tatiana Esich / Vitali Babkin	231	2007/2008 season (100%)	0	0	0	0	0
70	RUS	Tatiana Esich / Vitali Babkin	231	2006/2007 season (100%)	0	0	0	0	0
70	RUS	Tatiana Esich / Vitali Babkin	231	2005/2006 season (70%)	0	127	104	0	0
71	UKR	Julia Beloglazova / Andrei Bekh	228	2007/2008 season (100%)	0	0	0	0	0
71	UKR	Julia Beloglazova / Andrei Bekh	228	2006/2007 season (100%)	0	0	0	0	0
71	UKR	Julia Beloglazova / Andrei Bekh	228	2005/2006 season (70%)	228	0	0	0	0
71	CAN	Christianne Steele / Adam Johnson	228	2007/2008 season (100%)	0	120	108	0	0
71	CAN	Christianne Steele / Adam Johnson	228	2006/2007 season (100%)	0	0	0	0	0
71	CAN	Christianne Steele / Adam Johnson	228	2005/2006 season (70%)	0	0	0	0	0
73	ISR	Hayley Anne Sacks / Vadim Akolzin	222	2007/2008 season (100%)	222	0	0	0	0
73	ISR	Hayley Anne Sacks / Vadim Akolzin	222	2006/2007 season (100%)	0	0	0	0	0
73	ISR	Hayley Anne Sacks / Vadim Akolzin	222	2005/2006 season (70%)	0	0	0	0	0
74	CRO	Amy Ireland / Michael Bahoric	214	2007/2008 season (100%)	214	0	0	0	0
74	CRO	Amy Ireland / Michael Bahoric	214	2006/2007 season (100%)	0	0	0	0	0
74	CRO	Amy Ireland / Michael Bahoric	214	2005/2006 season (70%)	0	0	0	0	0
75	CHN	Xue Wang / Jian Wang	197	2007/2008 season (100%)	0	0	0	0	0
75	CHN	Xue Wang / Jian Wang	197	2006/2007 season (100%)	0	0	0	0	0
75	CHN	Xue Wang / Jian Wang	197	2005/2006 season (70%)	0	104	93	0	0
76	GRE	Ariel Fay Gagnon / Chad Tsagris	192	2007/2008 season (100%)	192	0	0	0	0
76	GRE	Ariel Fay Gagnon / Chad Tsagris	192	2006/2007 season (100%)	0	0	0	0	0
76	GRE	Ariel Fay Gagnon / Chad Tsagris	192	2005/2006 season (70%)	0	0	0	0	0
77	POL	Julia Szczerbowska / Lukasz Chluba	188	2007/2008 season (100%)	0	0	0	0	0
77	POL	Julia Szczerbowska / Lukasz Chluba	188	2006/2007 season (100%)	0	0	0	0	0
77	POL	Julia Szczerbowska / Lukasz Chluba	188	2005/2006 season (70%)	0	104	84	0	0
78	ITA	Nicole Della Monica / Yannick Kocon	182	2007/2008 season (100%)	182	0	0	0	0
78	ITA	Nicole Della Monica / Yannick Kocon	182	2006/2007 season (100%)	0	0	0	0	0
78	ITA	Nicole Della Monica / Yannick Kocon	182	2005/2006 season (70%)	0	0	0	0	0
78	CAN	Rachel Kirkland / Eric Radford	182	2007/2008 season (100%)	0	0	0	182	0
78	CAN	Rachel Kirkland / Eric Radford	182	2006/2007 season (100%)	0	0	0	0	0
78	CAN	Rachel Kirkland / Eric Radford	182	2005/2006 season (70%)	0	0	0	0	0
78	CAN	Paige Lawrence / Rudi Swiegers	182	2007/2008 season (100%)	0	182	0	0	0
78	CAN	Paige Lawrence / Rudi Swiegers	182	2006/2007 season (100%)	0	0	0	0	0
78	CAN	Paige Lawrence / Rudi Swiegers	182	2005/2006 season (70%)	0	0	0	0	0
81	UKR	Alina Dikhtiar / Filip Zalevski	166	2007/2008 season (100%)	0	0	0	0	0
81	UKR	Alina Dikhtiar / Filip Zalevski	166	2006/2007 season (100%)	0	0	0	0	0
81	UKR	Alina Dikhtiar / Filip Zalevski	166	2005/2006 season (70%)	166	0	0	0	0
82	USA	Andrea Best / Trevor Young	148	2007/2008 season (100%)	0	0	0	0	0
82	USA	Andrea Best / Trevor Young	148	2006/2007 season (100%)	0	148	0	0	0
82	USA	Andrea Best / Trevor Young	148	2005/2006 season (70%)	0	0	0	0	0
83	LTU	Agne Oradauskaite / Rudy Halmaert	147	2007/2008 season (100%)	0	0	0	0	0
83	LTU	Agne Oradauskaite / Rudy Halmaert	147	2006/2007 season (100%)	147	0	0	0	0
83	LTU	Agne Oradauskaite / Rudy Halmaert	147	2005/2006 season (70%)	0	0	0	0	0
84	RUS	Sabina Imaikina / Andrei Novoselov	133	2007/2008 season (100%)	0	133	0	0	0
84	RUS	Sabina Imaikina / Andrei Novoselov	133	2006/2007 season (100%)	0	0	0	0	0
84	RUS	Sabina Imaikina / Andrei Novoselov	133	2005/2006 season (70%)	0	0	0	0	0
85	SVK	Gabriela Cermanová / Martin Hanulák	132	2007/2008 season (100%)	132	0	0	0	0
85	SVK	Gabriela Cermanová / Martin Hanulák	132	2006/2007 season (100%)	0	0	0	0	0
85	SVK	Gabriela Cermanová / Martin Hanulák	132	2005/2006 season (70%)	0	0	0	0	0
86	FRA	Camille Foucher / Bruno Massot	119	2007/2008 season (100%)	119	0	0	0	0
86	FRA	Camille Foucher / Bruno Massot	119	2006/2007 season (100%)	0	0	0	0	0
86	FRA	Camille Foucher / Bruno Massot	119	2005/2006 season (70%)	0	0	0	0	0
87	USA	Tiffany Scott / Rusty Fein	115	2007/2008 season (100%)	0	0	0	0	0
87	USA	Tiffany Scott / Rusty Fein	115	2006/2007 season (100%)	0	0	0	0	0
87	USA	Tiffany Scott / Rusty Fein	115	2005/2006 season (70%)	0	0	0	115	0
88	USA	Meg Byrne / Nathan Bartholomay	108	2007/2008 season (100%)	0	108	0	0	0
88	USA	Meg Byrne / Nathan Bartholomay	108	2006/2007 season (100%)	0	0	0	0	0
88	USA	Meg Byrne / Nathan Bartholomay	108	2005/2006 season (70%)	0	0	0	0	0
88	USA	Claire Davis / Nathan Miller	108	2007/2008 season (100%)	0	108	0	0	0
88	USA	Claire Davis / Nathan Miller	108	2006/2007 season (100%)	0	0	0	0	0
88	USA	Claire Davis / Nathan Miller	108	2005/2006 season (70%)	0	0	0	0	0
90	CZE	Andrea Hollerova / Jakub Safranek	107	2007/2008 season (100%)	107	0	0	0	0
90	CZE	Andrea Hollerova / Jakub Safranek	107	2006/2007 season (100%)	0	0	0	0	0
90	CZE	Andrea Hollerova / Jakub Safranek	107	2005/2006 season (70%)	0	0	0	0	0
91	HUN	Natalie Ganem / Christopher Trefil	97	2007/2008 season (100%)	97	0	0	0	0
91	HUN	Natalie Ganem / Christopher Trefil	97	2006/2007 season (100%)	0	0	0	0	0
91	HUN	Natalie Ganem / Christopher Trefil	97	2005/2006 season (70%)	0	0	0	0	0
91	USA	Marissa Castelli / Simon Shnapir	97	2007/2008 season (100%)	0	97	0	0	0
91	USA	Marissa Castelli / Simon Shnapir	97	2006/2007 season (100%)	0	0	0	0	0
91	USA	Marissa Castelli / Simon Shnapir	97	2005/2006 season (70%)	0	0	0	0	0
91	RUS	Tatiana Novik / Konstantin Medovikov	97	2007/2008 season (100%)	0	97	0	0	0
91	RUS	Tatiana Novik / Konstantin Medovikov	97	2006/2007 season (100%)	0	0	0	0	0
91	RUS	Tatiana Novik / Konstantin Medovikov	97	2005/2006 season (70%)	0	0	0	0	0
91	IND	Upasana Upadhyay / Aaron Saladanha	97	2007/2008 season (100%)	0	0	0	0	0
91	IND	Upasana Upadhyay / Aaron Saladanha	97	2006/2007 season (100%)	0	97	0	0	0
91	IND	Upasana Upadhyay / Aaron Saladanha	97	2005/2006 season (70%)	0	0	0	0	0

==== Ice dance (143 couples) ====
As of 21 March 2008

Rank	Nation	Couple	Points	Season	ISU Championships or Olympics	(Junior) Grand Prix and Final		Selected International Competition	
Rank	Nation	Couple	Points	Season	Best	Best	2nd Best	Best	2nd Best
1	FRA	Isabelle Delobel / Olivier Schoenfelder	4316	2007/2008 season (100%)	1200	648	400	250	0
1	FRA	Isabelle Delobel / Olivier Schoenfelder	4316	2006/2007 season (100%)	875	583	360	0	0
1	FRA	Isabelle Delobel / Olivier Schoenfelder	4316	2005/2006 season (70%)	613	330	252	0	0
2	RUS	Oksana Domnina / Maxim Shabalin	4125	2007/2008 season (100%)	840	800	400	0	0
2	RUS	Oksana Domnina / Maxim Shabalin	4125	2006/2007 season (100%)	787	648	400	250	0
2	RUS	Oksana Domnina / Maxim Shabalin	4125	2005/2006 season (70%)	447	368	227	0	0
3	USA	Tanith Belbin / Benjamin Agosto	3727	2007/2008 season (100%)	875	720	400	0	0
3	USA	Tanith Belbin / Benjamin Agosto	3727	2006/2007 season (100%)	972	400	360	0	0
3	USA	Tanith Belbin / Benjamin Agosto	3727	2005/2006 season (70%)	756	280	0	0	0
4	CAN	Marie-France Dubreuil / Patrice Lauzon	3690	2007/2008 season (100%)	0	0	0	0	0
4	CAN	Marie-France Dubreuil / Patrice Lauzon	3690	2006/2007 season (100%)	1080	720	400	0	0
4	CAN	Marie-France Dubreuil / Patrice Lauzon	3690	2005/2006 season (70%)	756	454	280	0	0
5	CAN	Tessa Virtue / Scott Moir	3552	2007/2008 season (100%)	1080	583	400	0	0
5	CAN	Tessa Virtue / Scott Moir	3552	2006/2007 season (100%)	709	360	292	0	0
5	CAN	Tessa Virtue / Scott Moir	3552	2005/2006 season (70%)	501	420	175	0	0
6	BUL	Albena Denkova / Maxim Staviski	3492	2007/2008 season (100%)	0	0	0	0	0
6	BUL	Albena Denkova / Maxim Staviski	3492	2006/2007 season (100%)	1200	800	400	0	0
6	BUL	Albena Denkova / Maxim Staviski	3492	2005/2006 season (70%)	840	252	0	0	0
7	RUS	Jana Khokhlova / Sergei Novitski	3354	2007/2008 season (100%)	972	525	360	0	0
7	RUS	Jana Khokhlova / Sergei Novitski	3354	2006/2007 season (100%)	612	525	360	0	0
7	RUS	Jana Khokhlova / Sergei Novitski	3354	2005/2006 season (70%)	264	204	165	0	0
8	USA	Meryl Davis / Charlie White	2680	2007/2008 season (100%)	756	324	292	0	0
8	USA	Meryl Davis / Charlie White	2680	2006/2007 season (100%)	638	292	292	0	0
8	USA	Meryl Davis / Charlie White	2680	2005/2006 season (70%)	405	378	175	0	0
9	ITA	Federica Faiella / Massimo Scali	2600	2007/2008 season (100%)	787	324	324	0	0
9	ITA	Federica Faiella / Massimo Scali	2600	2006/2007 season (100%)	517	324	324	0	0
9	ITA	Federica Faiella / Massimo Scali	2600	2005/2006 season (70%)	402	227	165	0	0
10	RUS	Kristina Gorshkova / Vitali Butikov	2523	2007/2008 season (100%)	579	486	250	0	0
10	RUS	Kristina Gorshkova / Vitali Butikov	2523	2006/2007 season (100%)	521	437	250	0	0
10	RUS	Kristina Gorshkova / Vitali Butikov	2523	2005/2006 season (70%)	0	142	115	0	0
11	USA	Kimberly Navarro / Brent Bommentre	2493	2007/2008 season (100%)	680	236	236	0	0
11	USA	Kimberly Navarro / Brent Bommentre	2493	2006/2007 season (100%)	551	236	236	203	0
11	USA	Kimberly Navarro / Brent Bommentre	2493	2005/2006 season (70%)	0	0	0	115	0
12	USA	Emily Samuelson / Evan Bates	2489	2007/2008 season (100%)	715	540	250	0	0
12	USA	Emily Samuelson / Evan Bates	2489	2006/2007 season (100%)	0	540	250	0	0
12	USA	Emily Samuelson / Evan Bates	2489	2005/2006 season (70%)	194	115	84	0	0
13	GBR	Sinead Kerr / John Kerr	2483	2007/2008 season (100%)	574	292	262	0	0
13	GBR	Sinead Kerr / John Kerr	2483	2006/2007 season (100%)	551	292	262	250	0
13	GBR	Sinead Kerr / John Kerr	2483	2005/2006 season (70%)	326	149	0	0	0
14	FRA	Nathalie Péchalat / Fabian Bourzat	2384	2007/2008 season (100%)	638	472	360	0	0
14	FRA	Nathalie Péchalat / Fabian Bourzat	2384	2006/2007 season (100%)	377	324	213	0	0
14	FRA	Nathalie Péchalat / Fabian Bourzat	2384	2005/2006 season (70%)	205	183	183	0	0
15	RUS	Ekaterina Bobrova / Dmitri Soloviev	2344	2007/2008 season (100%)	339	292	262	0	0
15	RUS	Ekaterina Bobrova / Dmitri Soloviev	2344	2006/2007 season (100%)	715	486	250	0	0
15	RUS	Ekaterina Bobrova / Dmitri Soloviev	2344	2005/2006 season (70%)	0	223	158	0	0
16	AZE	Kristin Fraser / Igor Lukanin	2213	2007/2008 season (100%)	418	262	262	0	0
16	AZE	Kristin Fraser / Igor Lukanin	2213	2006/2007 season (100%)	446	213	0	250	0
16	AZE	Kristin Fraser / Igor Lukanin	2213	2005/2006 season (70%)	253	204	204	158	0
17	ITA	Anna Cappellini / Luca Lanotte	2121	2007/2008 season (100%)	465	360	292	0	0
17	ITA	Anna Cappellini / Luca Lanotte	2121	2006/2007 season (100%)	402	262	191	0	0
17	ITA	Anna Cappellini / Luca Lanotte	2121	2005/2006 season (70%)	365	340	158	0	0
18	USA	Melissa Gregory / Denis Petukhov	2090	2007/2008 season (100%)	0	0	0	0	0
18	USA	Melissa Gregory / Denis Petukhov	2090	2006/2007 season (100%)	465	472	360	0	0
18	USA	Melissa Gregory / Denis Petukhov	2090	2005/2006 season (70%)	362	227	204	0	0
19	ISR	Alexandra Zaretski / Roman Zaretski	2013	2007/2008 season (100%)	517	292	213	0	0
19	ISR	Alexandra Zaretski / Roman Zaretski	2013	2006/2007 season (100%)	305	292	191	203	0
19	ISR	Alexandra Zaretski / Roman Zaretski	2013	2005/2006 season (70%)	134	0	0	0	0
20	CAN	Vanessa Crone / Paul Poirier	2006	2007/2008 season (100%)	644	437	250	0	0
20	CAN	Vanessa Crone / Paul Poirier	2006	2006/2007 season (100%)	308	203	164	0	0
20	CAN	Vanessa Crone / Paul Poirier	2006	2005/2006 season (70%)	0	93	0	0	0
21	CAN	Kaitlyn Weaver / Andrew Poje	1985	2007/2008 season (100%)	551	236	213	0	0
21	CAN	Kaitlyn Weaver / Andrew Poje	1985	2006/2007 season (100%)	579	203	203	0	0
21	CAN	Kaitlyn Weaver / Andrew Poje	1985	2005/2006 season (70%)	0	0	0	0	0
22	RUS	Maria Monko / Ilia Tkachenko	1840	2007/2008 season (100%)	521	600	250	0	0
22	RUS	Maria Monko / Ilia Tkachenko	1840	2006/2007 season (100%)	469	0	0	0	0
22	RUS	Maria Monko / Ilia Tkachenko	1840	2005/2006 season (70%)	0	0	0	0	0
23	EST	Grethe Grünberg / Kristian Rand	1773	2007/2008 season (100%)	0	0	0	0	0
23	EST	Grethe Grünberg / Kristian Rand	1773	2006/2007 season (100%)	644	394	250	0	0
23	EST	Grethe Grünberg / Kristian Rand	1773	2005/2006 season (70%)	216	142	127	0	0
24	FRA	Pernelle Carron / Mathieu Jost	1763	2007/2008 season (100%)	362	324	262	0	0
24	FRA	Pernelle Carron / Mathieu Jost	1763	2006/2007 season (100%)	362	262	191	0	0
24	FRA	Pernelle Carron / Mathieu Jost	1763	2005/2006 season (70%)	0	0	0	0	0
25	USA	Madison Hubbell / Keiffer Hubbell	1741	2007/2008 season (100%)	469	0	0	0	0
25	USA	Madison Hubbell / Keiffer Hubbell	1741	2006/2007 season (100%)	422	600	250	0	0
25	USA	Madison Hubbell / Keiffer Hubbell	1741	2005/2006 season (70%)	0	0	0	0	0
26	ARM	Anastasia Grebenkina / Vazgen Azrojan	1502	2007/2008 season (100%)	0	236	236	203	0
26	ARM	Anastasia Grebenkina / Vazgen Azrojan	1502	2006/2007 season (100%)	214	236	0	0	0
26	ARM	Anastasia Grebenkina / Vazgen Azrojan	1502	2005/2006 season (70%)	150	227	0	0	0
27	CAN	Allie Hann-McCurdy / Michael Coreno	1494	2007/2008 season (100%)	496	292	0	182	0
27	CAN	Allie Hann-McCurdy / Michael Coreno	1494	2006/2007 season (100%)	0	0	0	0	0
27	CAN	Allie Hann-McCurdy / Michael Coreno	1494	2005/2006 season (70%)	239	158	127	0	0
28	UKR	Elena Grushina / Ruslan Goncharov	1464	2007/2008 season (100%)	0	0	0	0	0
28	UKR	Elena Grushina / Ruslan Goncharov	1464	2006/2007 season (100%)	0	0	0	0	0
28	UKR	Elena Grushina / Ruslan Goncharov	1464	2005/2006 season (70%)	680	504	280	0	0
29	UKR	Anna Zadorozhniuk / Sergei Verbillo	1414	2007/2008 season (100%)	293	324	236	0	0
29	UKR	Anna Zadorozhniuk / Sergei Verbillo	1414	2006/2007 season (100%)	325	236	0	0	0
29	UKR	Anna Zadorozhniuk / Sergei Verbillo	1414	2005/2006 season (70%)	102	0	0	0	0
30	UKR	Alisa Agafonova / Dmitri Dun	1366	2007/2008 season (100%)	380	354	225	0	0
30	UKR	Alisa Agafonova / Dmitri Dun	1366	2006/2007 season (100%)	0	225	182	0	0
30	UKR	Alisa Agafonova / Dmitri Dun	1366	2005/2006 season (70%)	0	68	0	0	0
31	FRA	Elodie Brouiller / Benoit Richaud	1307	2007/2008 season (100%)	0	0	0	0	0
31	FRA	Elodie Brouiller / Benoit Richaud	1307	2006/2007 season (100%)	380	319	225	0	0
31	FRA	Elodie Brouiller / Benoit Richaud	1307	2005/2006 season (70%)	141	127	115	0	0
32	GER	Christina Beier / William Beier	1292	2007/2008 season (100%)	192	0	0	225	182
32	GER	Christina Beier / William Beier	1292	2006/2007 season (100%)	0	0	0	0	0
32	GER	Christina Beier / William Beier	1292	2005/2006 season (70%)	237	165	149	142	0
33	JPN	Cathy Reed / Chris Reed	1265	2007/2008 season (100%)	446	191	0	0	0
33	JPN	Cathy Reed / Chris Reed	1265	2006/2007 season (100%)	446	0	0	182	0
33	JPN	Cathy Reed / Chris Reed	1265	2005/2006 season (70%)	0	0	0	0	0
34	RUS	Anastasia Platonova / Andrei Maximishin	1238	2007/2008 season (100%)	0	0	0	0	0
34	RUS	Anastasia Platonova / Andrei Maximishin	1238	2006/2007 season (100%)	0	262	0	225	0
34	RUS	Anastasia Platonova / Andrei Maximishin	1238	2005/2006 season (70%)	328	248	175	0	0
35	CHN	Xintong Huang / Xun Zheng	1168	2007/2008 season (100%)	362	213	0	0	0
35	CHN	Xintong Huang / Xun Zheng	1168	2006/2007 season (100%)	402	0	0	0	0
35	CHN	Xintong Huang / Xun Zheng	1168	2005/2006 season (70%)	228	115	76	0	0
36	ISR	Galit Chait / Sergei Sakhnovski	1156	2007/2008 season (100%)	0	0	0	0	0
36	ISR	Galit Chait / Sergei Sakhnovski	1156	2006/2007 season (100%)	0	0	0	0	0
36	ISR	Galit Chait / Sergei Sakhnovski	1156	2005/2006 season (70%)	496	408	252	0	0
37	UKR	Alla Beknazarova / Vladimir Zuev	1129	2007/2008 season (100%)	214	0	0	250	203
37	UKR	Alla Beknazarova / Vladimir Zuev	1129	2006/2007 season (100%)	237	0	0	225	0
37	UKR	Alla Beknazarova / Vladimir Zuev	1129	2005/2006 season (70%)	74	0	0	0	0
38	RUS	Natalia Mikhailova / Arkadi Sergeev	1123	2007/2008 season (100%)	0	0	0	0	0
38	RUS	Natalia Mikhailova / Arkadi Sergeev	1123	2006/2007 season (100%)	0	191	0	0	0
38	RUS	Natalia Mikhailova / Arkadi Sergeev	1123	2005/2006 season (70%)	451	306	175	0	0
39	LTU	Katherine Copely / Deividas Stagniūnas	1113	2007/2008 season (100%)	305	262	0	203	0
39	LTU	Katherine Copely / Deividas Stagniūnas	1113	2006/2007 season (100%)	140	0	0	203	0
39	LTU	Katherine Copely / Deividas Stagniūnas	1113	2005/2006 season (70%)	0	0	0	0	0
40	ITA	Isabella Pajardi / Stefano Caruso	1081	2007/2008 season (100%)	308	319	250	0	0
40	ITA	Isabella Pajardi / Stefano Caruso	1081	2006/2007 season (100%)	0	120	0	0	0
40	ITA	Isabella Pajardi / Stefano Caruso	1081	2005/2006 season (70%)	0	84	0	0	0
41	GER	Carolina Hermann / Daniel Hermann	1070	2007/2008 season (100%)	0	191	0	225	164
41	GER	Carolina Hermann / Daniel Hermann	1070	2006/2007 season (100%)	277	120	0	0	0
41	GER	Carolina Hermann / Daniel Hermann	1070	2005/2006 season (70%)	0	93	0	0	0
42	RUS	Ekaterina Riazanova / Jonathan Guerreiro	1042	2007/2008 season (100%)	422	287	225	0	0
42	RUS	Ekaterina Riazanova / Jonathan Guerreiro	1042	2006/2007 season (100%)	0	108	0	0	0
42	RUS	Ekaterina Riazanova / Jonathan Guerreiro	1042	2005/2006 season (70%)	0	0	0	0	0
43	CZE	Lucie Myslivecková / Matej Novák	953	2007/2008 season (100%)	224	225	182	203	0
43	CZE	Lucie Myslivecková / Matej Novák	953	2006/2007 season (100%)	119	0	0	0	0
43	CZE	Lucie Myslivecková / Matej Novák	953	2005/2006 season (70%)	75	0	0	0	0
44	RUS	Julia Zlobina / Alexei Sitnikov	944	2007/2008 season (100%)	0	213	0	0	0
44	RUS	Julia Zlobina / Alexei Sitnikov	944	2006/2007 season (100%)	0	354	250	0	0
44	RUS	Julia Zlobina / Alexei Sitnikov	944	2005/2006 season (70%)	0	127	104	0	0
45	RUS	Ekaterina Rubleva / Ivan Shefer	943	2007/2008 season (100%)	275	213	191	0	0
45	RUS	Ekaterina Rubleva / Ivan Shefer	943	2006/2007 season (100%)	264	0	0	0	0
45	RUS	Ekaterina Rubleva / Ivan Shefer	943	2005/2006 season (70%)	0	0	0	0	0
46	POL	Joanna Budner / Jan Moscicki	937	2007/2008 season (100%)	126	148	133	0	0
46	POL	Joanna Budner / Jan Moscicki	937	2006/2007 season (100%)	202	164	133	0	0
46	POL	Joanna Budner / Jan Moscicki	937	2005/2006 season (70%)	157	104	84	0	0
47	GER	Nelli Zhiganshina / Alexander Gazsi	930	2007/2008 season (100%)	162	213	191	164	0
47	GER	Nelli Zhiganshina / Alexander Gazsi	930	2006/2007 season (100%)	200	0	0	0	0
47	GER	Nelli Zhiganshina / Alexander Gazsi	930	2005/2006 season (70%)	0	0	0	0	0
48	AUT	Barbora Silná / Dmitri Matsjuk	879	2007/2008 season (100%)	173	191	0	225	0
48	AUT	Barbora Silná / Dmitri Matsjuk	879	2006/2007 season (100%)	126	0	0	164	0
48	AUT	Barbora Silná / Dmitri Matsjuk	879	2005/2006 season (70%)	0	0	0	0	0
49	USA	Jennifer Wester / Daniil Barantsev	862	2007/2008 season (100%)	612	0	0	250	0
49	USA	Jennifer Wester / Daniil Barantsev	862	2006/2007 season (100%)	0	0	0	0	0
49	USA	Jennifer Wester / Daniil Barantsev	862	2005/2006 season (70%)	0	0	0	0	0
50	HUN	Krisztina Barta / Adam Toth	823	2007/2008 season (100%)	102	0	0	164	0
50	HUN	Krisztina Barta / Adam Toth	823	2006/2007 season (100%)	164	133	108	0	0
50	HUN	Krisztina Barta / Adam Toth	823	2005/2006 season (70%)	92	76	76	0	0
51	CAN	Joanna Lenko / Mitchell Islam	817	2007/2008 season (100%)	0	225	203	0	0
51	CAN	Joanna Lenko / Mitchell Islam	817	2006/2007 season (100%)	0	225	164	0	0
51	CAN	Joanna Lenko / Mitchell Islam	817	2005/2006 season (70%)	0	76	0	0	0
52	UKR	Nadezhda Frolenkova / Mikhail Kasalo	812	2007/2008 season (100%)	0	203	182	0	0
52	UKR	Nadezhda Frolenkova / Mikhail Kasalo	812	2006/2007 season (100%)	224	203	0	0	0
52	UKR	Nadezhda Frolenkova / Mikhail Kasalo	812	2005/2006 season (70%)	0	0	0	0	0
53	LTU	Margarita Drobiazko / Povilas Vanagas	788	2007/2008 season (100%)	0	0	0	0	0
53	LTU	Margarita Drobiazko / Povilas Vanagas	788	2006/2007 season (100%)	0	0	0	0	0
53	LTU	Margarita Drobiazko / Povilas Vanagas	788	2005/2006 season (70%)	613	0	0	175	0
54	CHN	Xiaoyang Yu / Chen Wang	764	2007/2008 season (100%)	402	0	0	0	0
54	CHN	Xiaoyang Yu / Chen Wang	764	2006/2007 season (100%)	362	0	0	0	0
54	CHN	Xiaoyang Yu / Chen Wang	764	2005/2006 season (70%)	312	0	0	0	0
55	CAN	Karen Routhier / Eric Saucke-Lacelle	743	2007/2008 season (100%)	277	164	120	0	0
55	CAN	Karen Routhier / Eric Saucke-Lacelle	743	2006/2007 season (100%)	0	182	0	0	0
55	CAN	Karen Routhier / Eric Saucke-Lacelle	743	2005/2006 season (70%)	0	0	0	0	0
56	USA	Piper Gilles / Timothy McKernan	697	2007/2008 season (100%)	0	182	164	0	0
56	USA	Piper Gilles / Timothy McKernan	697	2006/2007 season (100%)	0	203	148	0	0
56	USA	Piper Gilles / Timothy McKernan	697	2005/2006 season (70%)	0	0	0	0	0
57	USA	Shannon Wingle / Ryan Devereaux	670	2007/2008 season (100%)	0	225	164	0	0
57	USA	Shannon Wingle / Ryan Devereaux	670	2006/2007 season (100%)	0	148	133	0	0
57	USA	Shannon Wingle / Ryan Devereaux	670	2005/2006 season (70%)	0	0	0	0	0
58	CAN	Kharis Ralph / Asher Hill	657	2007/2008 season (100%)	342	182	133	0	0
58	CAN	Kharis Ralph / Asher Hill	657	2006/2007 season (100%)	0	0	0	0	0
58	CAN	Kharis Ralph / Asher Hill	657	2005/2006 season (70%)	0	0	0	0	0
59	USA	Pilar Bosley / John Corona	651	2007/2008 season (100%)	0	203	164	0	0
59	USA	Pilar Bosley / John Corona	651	2006/2007 season (100%)	0	164	120	0	0
59	USA	Pilar Bosley / John Corona	651	2005/2006 season (70%)	0	0	0	0	0
60	USA	Madison Chock / Greg Zuerlein	644	2007/2008 season (100%)	0	394	250	0	0
60	USA	Madison Chock / Greg Zuerlein	644	2006/2007 season (100%)	0	0	0	0	0
60	USA	Madison Chock / Greg Zuerlein	644	2005/2006 season (70%)	0	0	0	0	0
61	UKR	Alina Saprikina / Pavel Khimich	608	2007/2008 season (100%)	0	0	0	0	0
61	UKR	Alina Saprikina / Pavel Khimich	608	2006/2007 season (100%)	0	182	182	0	0
61	UKR	Alina Saprikina / Pavel Khimich	608	2005/2006 season (70%)	83	93	68	0	0
62	POL	Alexandra Kauc / Michal Zych	591	2007/2008 season (100%)	0	0	0	0	0
62	POL	Alexandra Kauc / Michal Zych	591	2006/2007 season (100%)	0	0	0	182	0
62	POL	Alexandra Kauc / Michal Zych	591	2005/2006 season (70%)	126	149	134	0	0
63	UKR	Anastasia Vykhodtseva / Alexei Shumski	581	2007/2008 season (100%)	0	203	182	0	0
63	UKR	Anastasia Vykhodtseva / Alexei Shumski	581	2006/2007 season (100%)	0	120	0	0	0
63	UKR	Anastasia Vykhodtseva / Alexei Shumski	581	2005/2006 season (70%)	0	76	76	0	0
64	CZE	Kamila Hajkova / David Vincour	562	2007/2008 season (100%)	156	0	0	250	0
64	CZE	Kamila Hajkova / David Vincour	562	2006/2007 season (100%)	156	0	0	0	0
64	CZE	Kamila Hajkova / David Vincour	562	2005/2006 season (70%)	88	0	0	0	0
65	MEX	Laura Munana / Luke Munana	546	2007/2008 season (100%)	0	0	0	0	0
65	MEX	Laura Munana / Luke Munana	546	2006/2007 season (100%)	293	0	0	0	0
65	MEX	Laura Munana / Luke Munana	546	2005/2006 season (70%)	253	0	0	0	0
66	UZB	Olga Akimova / Alexander Shakalov	530	2007/2008 season (100%)	0	0	0	0	0
66	UZB	Olga Akimova / Alexander Shakalov	530	2006/2007 season (100%)	325	0	0	0	0
66	UZB	Olga Akimova / Alexander Shakalov	530	2005/2006 season (70%)	205	0	0	0	0
67	RUS	Ksenia Antonova / Roman Mylnikov	527	2007/2008 season (100%)	0	0	0	0	0
67	RUS	Ksenia Antonova / Roman Mylnikov	527	2006/2007 season (100%)	0	203	182	0	0
67	RUS	Ksenia Antonova / Roman Mylnikov	527	2005/2006 season (70%)	0	142	0	0	0
68	GEO	Ekaterina Zaikina / Otar Japaridze	523	2007/2008 season (100%)	0	0	0	0	0
68	GEO	Ekaterina Zaikina / Otar Japaridze	523	2006/2007 season (100%)	147	182	133	0	0
68	GEO	Ekaterina Zaikina / Otar Japaridze	523	2005/2006 season (70%)	61	0	0	0	0
69	AUS	Danielle O'Brien / Gregory Merriman	519	2007/2008 season (100%)	325	0	0	0	0
69	AUS	Danielle O'Brien / Gregory Merriman	519	2006/2007 season (100%)	97	97	0	0	0
69	AUS	Danielle O'Brien / Gregory Merriman	519	2005/2006 season (70%)	49	0	0	0	0
70	FRA	Maureen Ibanez / Neil Brown	505	2007/2008 season (100%)	249	148	108	0	0
70	FRA	Maureen Ibanez / Neil Brown	505	2006/2007 season (100%)	0	0	0	0	0
70	FRA	Maureen Ibanez / Neil Brown	505	2005/2006 season (70%)	0	0	0	0	0
71	AUS	Maria Borounov / Evgeni Borounov	501	2007/2008 season (100%)	237	0	0	0	0
71	AUS	Maria Borounov / Evgeni Borounov	501	2006/2007 season (100%)	264	0	0	0	0
71	AUS	Maria Borounov / Evgeni Borounov	501	2005/2006 season (70%)	150	0	0	0	0
72	GER	Tanja Kolbe / Sascha Rabe	494	2007/2008 season (100%)	0	0	0	182	0
72	GER	Tanja Kolbe / Sascha Rabe	494	2006/2007 season (100%)	0	164	148	0	0
72	GER	Tanja Kolbe / Sascha Rabe	494	2005/2006 season (70%)	0	0	0	0	0
73	FRA	Scarlett Rouzet / Lionel Rumi	476	2007/2008 season (100%)	0	148	108	0	0
73	FRA	Scarlett Rouzet / Lionel Rumi	476	2006/2007 season (100%)	0	0	0	0	0
73	FRA	Scarlett Rouzet / Lionel Rumi	476	2005/2006 season (70%)	0	127	93	0	0
74	GEO	Isabella Tobias / Otar Japaridze	463	2007/2008 season (100%)	182	148	133	0	0
74	GEO	Isabella Tobias / Otar Japaridze	463	2006/2007 season (100%)	0	0	0	0	0
74	GEO	Isabella Tobias / Otar Japaridze	463	2005/2006 season (70%)	0	0	0	0	0
74	RUS	Ekaterina Pushkash / Dmitri Kiselev	463	2007/2008 season (100%)	0	182	148	0	0
74	RUS	Ekaterina Pushkash / Dmitri Kiselev	463	2006/2007 season (100%)	0	133	0	0	0
74	RUS	Ekaterina Pushkash / Dmitri Kiselev	463	2005/2006 season (70%)	0	0	0	0	0
76	FRA	Zoe Blanc / Pierre-Loup Bouquet	436	2007/2008 season (100%)	0	191	0	0	0
76	FRA	Zoe Blanc / Pierre-Loup Bouquet	436	2006/2007 season (100%)	0	148	97	0	0
76	FRA	Zoe Blanc / Pierre-Loup Bouquet	436	2005/2006 season (70%)	0	0	0	0	0
77	UKR	Olga Oksenich / Oleg Tazetdinov	423	2007/2008 season (100%)	0	0	0	0	0
77	UKR	Olga Oksenich / Oleg Tazetdinov	423	2006/2007 season (100%)	0	182	148	0	0
77	UKR	Olga Oksenich / Oleg Tazetdinov	423	2005/2006 season (70%)	0	93	0	0	0
78	GER	Ashley Foy / Benjamin Blum	419	2007/2008 season (100%)	202	120	0	0	0
78	GER	Ashley Foy / Benjamin Blum	419	2006/2007 season (100%)	0	97	0	0	0
78	GER	Ashley Foy / Benjamin Blum	419	2005/2006 season (70%)	0	0	0	0	0
79	RUS	Ksenia Monko / Kirill Khaliavin	406	2007/2008 season (100%)	0	203	203	0	0
79	RUS	Ksenia Monko / Kirill Khaliavin	406	2006/2007 season (100%)	0	0	0	0	0
79	RUS	Ksenia Monko / Kirill Khaliavin	406	2005/2006 season (70%)	0	0	0	0	0
80	FRA	Charlene Guignard / Guillaume Paulmier	391	2007/2008 season (100%)	119	164	108	0	0
80	FRA	Charlene Guignard / Guillaume Paulmier	391	2006/2007 season (100%)	0	0	0	0	0
80	FRA	Charlene Guignard / Guillaume Paulmier	391	2005/2006 season (70%)	0	0	0	0	0
81	CAN	Mylene Lamoureux / Michael Mee	361	2007/2008 season (100%)	0	0	0	0	0
81	CAN	Mylene Lamoureux / Michael Mee	361	2006/2007 season (100%)	0	0	0	0	0
81	CAN	Mylene Lamoureux / Michael Mee	361	2005/2006 season (70%)	115	142	104	0	0
82	SVK	Nikola Visnova / Lukáš Csölley	359	2007/2008 season (100%)	132	120	0	0	0
82	SVK	Nikola Visnova / Lukáš Csölley	359	2006/2007 season (100%)	107	0	0	0	0
82	SVK	Nikola Visnova / Lukáš Csölley	359	2005/2006 season (70%)	0	0	0	0	0
83	EST	Irina Shtork / Taavi Rand	350	2007/2008 season (100%)	78	97	97	0	0
83	EST	Irina Shtork / Taavi Rand	350	2006/2007 season (100%)	78	0	0	0	0
83	EST	Irina Shtork / Taavi Rand	350	2005/2006 season (70%)	0	0	0	0	0
84	USA	Rachel Tibbetts / Collin Brubaker	328	2007/2008 season (100%)	0	164	164	0	0
84	USA	Rachel Tibbetts / Collin Brubaker	328	2006/2007 season (100%)	0	0	0	0	0
84	USA	Rachel Tibbetts / Collin Brubaker	328	2005/2006 season (70%)	0	0	0	0	0
85	RUS	Elizaveta Tchetinkina / Denis Smirnov	312	2007/2008 season (100%)	0	164	148	0	0
85	RUS	Elizaveta Tchetinkina / Denis Smirnov	312	2006/2007 season (100%)	0	0	0	0	0
85	RUS	Elizaveta Tchetinkina / Denis Smirnov	312	2005/2006 season (70%)	0	0	0	0	0
86	GBR	Leigh Rogers / Lloyd Jones	308	2007/2008 season (100%)	0	0	0	0	0
86	GBR	Leigh Rogers / Lloyd Jones	308	2006/2007 season (100%)	132	108	0	0	0
86	GBR	Leigh Rogers / Lloyd Jones	308	2005/2006 season (70%)	68	0	0	0	0
87	USA	Isabella Cannuscio / Ian Lorello	302	2007/2008 season (100%)	0	182	120	0	0
87	USA	Isabella Cannuscio / Ian Lorello	302	2006/2007 season (100%)	0	0	0	0	0
87	USA	Isabella Cannuscio / Ian Lorello	302	2005/2006 season (70%)	0	0	0	0	0
88	ITA	Lorenza Alessandrini / Simone Vaturi	296	2007/2008 season (100%)	0	148	148	0	0
88	ITA	Lorenza Alessandrini / Simone Vaturi	296	2006/2007 season (100%)	0	0	0	0	0
88	ITA	Lorenza Alessandrini / Simone Vaturi	296	2005/2006 season (70%)	0	0	0	0	0
89	CHN	Jiameimei Guo / Fei Meng	293	2007/2008 season (100%)	293	0	0	0	0
89	CHN	Jiameimei Guo / Fei Meng	293	2006/2007 season (100%)	0	0	0	0	0
89	CHN	Jiameimei Guo / Fei Meng	293	2005/2006 season (70%)	0	0	0	0	0
90	JPN	Nakako Tsuzuki / Kenji Miyamoto	281	2007/2008 season (100%)	0	0	0	0	0
90	JPN	Nakako Tsuzuki / Kenji Miyamoto	281	2006/2007 season (100%)	0	0	0	0	0
90	JPN	Nakako Tsuzuki / Kenji Miyamoto	281	2005/2006 season (70%)	281	0	0	0	0
91	UZB	Sun Hye Yu / Ramil Sarkulov	264	2007/2008 season (100%)	264	0	0	0	0
91	UZB	Sun Hye Yu / Ramil Sarkulov	264	2006/2007 season (100%)	0	0	0	0	0
91	UZB	Sun Hye Yu / Ramil Sarkulov	264	2005/2006 season (70%)	0	0	0	0	0
92	RUS	Marina Antipova / Artem Kudashev	253	2007/2008 season (100%)	0	133	0	0	0
92	RUS	Marina Antipova / Artem Kudashev	253	2006/2007 season (100%)	0	120	0	0	0
92	RUS	Marina Antipova / Artem Kudashev	253	2005/2006 season (70%)	0	0	0	0	0
92	USA	Anastasia Cannuscio / Dean Copely	253	2007/2008 season (100%)	0	133	120	0	0
92	USA	Anastasia Cannuscio / Dean Copely	253	2006/2007 season (100%)	0	0	0	0	0
92	USA	Anastasia Cannuscio / Dean Copely	253	2005/2006 season (70%)	0	0	0	0	0
94	USA	Lynn Kriengkrairut / Logan Giulietti-Schmitt	249	2007/2008 season (100%)	0	0	0	0	0
94	USA	Lynn Kriengkrairut / Logan Giulietti-Schmitt	249	2006/2007 season (100%)	249	0	0	0	0
94	USA	Lynn Kriengkrairut / Logan Giulietti-Schmitt	249	2005/2006 season (70%)	0	0	0	0	0
95	POL	Anastasia Gavrylovych / Maciej Bernadowski	244	2007/2008 season (100%)	147	97	0	0	0
95	POL	Anastasia Gavrylovych / Maciej Bernadowski	244	2006/2007 season (100%)	0	0	0	0	0
95	POL	Anastasia Gavrylovych / Maciej Bernadowski	244	2005/2006 season (70%)	0	0	0	0	0
96	UKR	Julia Golovina / Oleg Voiko	243	2007/2008 season (100%)	0	0	0	0	0
96	UKR	Julia Golovina / Oleg Voiko	243	2006/2007 season (100%)	0	0	0	0	0
96	UKR	Julia Golovina / Oleg Voiko	243	2005/2006 season (70%)	109	134	0	0	0
97	USA	Elizabeth Miosi / Dmitri Ponomarev	231	2007/2008 season (100%)	0	0	0	0	0
97	USA	Elizabeth Miosi / Dmitri Ponomarev	231	2006/2007 season (100%)	0	0	0	0	0
97	USA	Elizabeth Miosi / Dmitri Ponomarev	231	2005/2006 season (70%)	0	127	104	0	0
98	HUN	Dorina Molnar / Gabor Balint	228	2007/2008 season (100%)	0	0	0	0	0
98	HUN	Dorina Molnar / Gabor Balint	228	2006/2007 season (100%)	0	120	108	0	0
98	HUN	Dorina Molnar / Gabor Balint	228	2005/2006 season (70%)	0	0	0	0	0
99	RUS	Natalia Mikhailova / Andrei Maximishin	225	2007/2008 season (100%)	0	0	0	225	0
99	RUS	Natalia Mikhailova / Andrei Maximishin	225	2006/2007 season (100%)	0	0	0	0	0
99	RUS	Natalia Mikhailova / Andrei Maximishin	225	2005/2006 season (70%)	0	0	0	0	0
100	GBR	Phillipa Towler-Green / Phillip Poole	223	2007/2008 season (100%)	140	0	0	0	0
100	GBR	Phillipa Towler-Green / Phillip Poole	223	2006/2007 season (100%)	83	0	0	0	0
100	GBR	Phillipa Towler-Green / Phillip Poole	223	2005/2006 season (70%)	79	0	0	0	0
101	HUN	Emese Laszlo / Mate Fejes	205	2007/2008 season (100%)	97	108	0	0	0
101	HUN	Emese Laszlo / Mate Fejes	205	2006/2007 season (100%)	0	0	0	0	0
101	HUN	Emese Laszlo / Mate Fejes	205	2005/2006 season (70%)	0	0	0	0	0
102	USA	Mauri Gustafson / Logan Giulietti-Schmitt	188	2007/2008 season (100%)	0	0	0	0	0
102	USA	Mauri Gustafson / Logan Giulietti-Schmitt	188	2006/2007 season (100%)	0	0	0	0	0
102	USA	Mauri Gustafson / Logan Giulietti-Schmitt	188	2005/2006 season (70%)	0	104	84	0	0
103	AUS	Natalie Buck / Trent Nelson-Bond	185	2007/2008 season (100%)	0	0	0	0	0
103	AUS	Natalie Buck / Trent Nelson-Bond	185	2006/2007 season (100%)	0	0	0	0	0
103	AUS	Natalie Buck / Trent Nelson-Bond	185	2005/2006 season (70%)	185	0	0	0	0
104	HUN	Zsuzsanna Nagy / György Elek	184	2007/2008 season (100%)	0	0	0	0	0
104	HUN	Zsuzsanna Nagy / György Elek	184	2006/2007 season (100%)	113	0	0	0	0
104	HUN	Zsuzsanna Nagy / György Elek	184	2005/2006 season (70%)	71	0	0	0	0
105	CAN	Siobhan Karam / Kevin O'Keefe	182	2007/2008 season (100%)	0	0	0	182	0
105	CAN	Siobhan Karam / Kevin O'Keefe	182	2006/2007 season (100%)	0	0	0	0	0
105	CAN	Siobhan Karam / Kevin O'Keefe	182	2005/2006 season (70%)	0	0	0	0	0
105	USA	Caitlin Mallory / Brent Holdburg	182	2007/2008 season (100%)	0	0	0	0	0
105	USA	Caitlin Mallory / Brent Holdburg	182	2006/2007 season (100%)	0	0	0	182	0
105	USA	Caitlin Mallory / Brent Holdburg	182	2005/2006 season (70%)	0	0	0	0	0
107	SUI	Leonie Krail / Oscar Peter	177	2007/2008 season (100%)	113	0	0	0	0
107	SUI	Leonie Krail / Oscar Peter	177	2006/2007 season (100%)	0	0	0	0	0
107	SUI	Leonie Krail / Oscar Peter	177	2005/2006 season (70%)	64	0	0	0	0
108	THA	Alisa Allapach / Peter Kongkasem	166	2007/2008 season (100%)	0	0	0	0	0
108	THA	Alisa Allapach / Peter Kongkasem	166	2006/2007 season (100%)	0	0	0	0	0
108	THA	Alisa Allapach / Peter Kongkasem	166	2005/2006 season (70%)	166	0	0	0	0
109	GER	Ekaterina Zabolotnaya / Julian Wagner	165	2007/2008 season (100%)	0	97	0	0	0
109	GER	Ekaterina Zabolotnaya / Julian Wagner	165	2006/2007 season (100%)	0	0	0	0	0
109	GER	Ekaterina Zabolotnaya / Julian Wagner	165	2005/2006 season (70%)	0	68	0	0	0
110	ITA	Natalia Mitiushina / Matteo Zanni	164	2007/2008 season (100%)	164	0	0	0	0
110	ITA	Natalia Mitiushina / Matteo Zanni	164	2006/2007 season (100%)	0	0	0	0	0
110	ITA	Natalia Mitiushina / Matteo Zanni	164	2005/2006 season (70%)	0	0	0	0	0
110	GBR	Kira Geil / Andrew Smykowski	164	2007/2008 season (100%)	0	0	0	0	0
110	GBR	Kira Geil / Andrew Smykowski	164	2006/2007 season (100%)	0	0	0	164	0
110	GBR	Kira Geil / Andrew Smykowski	164	2005/2006 season (70%)	0	0	0	0	0
110	CAN	Siobhan Karam / Joshua McGrath	164	2007/2008 season (100%)	0	0	0	0	0
110	CAN	Siobhan Karam / Joshua McGrath	164	2006/2007 season (100%)	0	0	0	164	0
110	CAN	Siobhan Karam / Joshua McGrath	164	2005/2006 season (70%)	0	0	0	0	0
110	CAN	Brooklyn Vienneau / Jonathan Cluett	164	2007/2008 season (100%)	0	0	0	0	0
110	CAN	Brooklyn Vienneau / Jonathan Cluett	164	2006/2007 season (100%)	0	164	0	0	0
110	CAN	Brooklyn Vienneau / Jonathan Cluett	164	2005/2006 season (70%)	0	0	0	0	0
114	USA	Tiffany Stiegler / Sergei Magerovski	149	2007/2008 season (100%)	0	0	0	0	0
114	USA	Tiffany Stiegler / Sergei Magerovski	149	2006/2007 season (100%)	0	0	0	0	0
114	USA	Tiffany Stiegler / Sergei Magerovski	149	2005/2006 season (70%)	0	149	0	0	0
115	HUN	Olivia Lalatka / Gabor Balint	144	2007/2008 season (100%)	0	0	0	0	0
115	HUN	Olivia Lalatka / Gabor Balint	144	2006/2007 season (100%)	0	0	0	0	0
115	HUN	Olivia Lalatka / Gabor Balint	144	2005/2006 season (70%)	0	76	68	0	0
116	KOR	Hye Min Kim / Min Woo Kim	134	2007/2008 season (100%)	0	0	0	0	0
116	KOR	Hye Min Kim / Min Woo Kim	134	2006/2007 season (100%)	0	0	0	0	0
116	KOR	Hye Min Kim / Min Woo Kim	134	2005/2006 season (70%)	134	0	0	0	0
117	USA	Sara Bailey / Kyle Herring	133	2007/2008 season (100%)	0	133	0	0	0
117	USA	Sara Bailey / Kyle Herring	133	2006/2007 season (100%)	0	0	0	0	0
117	USA	Sara Bailey / Kyle Herring	133	2005/2006 season (70%)	0	0	0	0	0
117	RUS	Tatiana Baturintseva / Ivan Volobuiev	133	2007/2008 season (100%)	0	133	0	0	0
117	RUS	Tatiana Baturintseva / Ivan Volobuiev	133	2006/2007 season (100%)	0	0	0	0	0
117	RUS	Tatiana Baturintseva / Ivan Volobuiev	133	2005/2006 season (70%)	0	0	0	0	0
117	CAN	Christina Bourgeois / Frederick Allain	133	2007/2008 season (100%)	0	0	0	0	0
117	CAN	Christina Bourgeois / Frederick Allain	133	2006/2007 season (100%)	0	133	0	0	0
117	CAN	Christina Bourgeois / Frederick Allain	133	2005/2006 season (70%)	0	0	0	0	0
117	CAN	Anna Stanislavska / Dylan Fieldhouse	133	2007/2008 season (100%)	0	133	0	0	0
117	CAN	Anna Stanislavska / Dylan Fieldhouse	133	2006/2007 season (100%)	0	0	0	0	0
117	CAN	Anna Stanislavska / Dylan Fieldhouse	133	2005/2006 season (70%)	0	0	0	0	0
121	USA	Lindsay Cohen / Evan Roberts	120	2007/2008 season (100%)	0	0	0	0	0
121	USA	Lindsay Cohen / Evan Roberts	120	2006/2007 season (100%)	0	120	0	0	0
121	USA	Lindsay Cohen / Evan Roberts	120	2005/2006 season (70%)	0	0	0	0	0
121	UKR	Anastasia Galyeta / Semen Kaplun	120	2007/2008 season (100%)	0	120	0	0	0
121	UKR	Anastasia Galyeta / Semen Kaplun	120	2006/2007 season (100%)	0	0	0	0	0
121	UKR	Anastasia Galyeta / Semen Kaplun	120	2005/2006 season (70%)	0	0	0	0	0
121	CAN	Tarrah Harvey / Keith Gagnon	120	2007/2008 season (100%)	0	120	0	0	0
121	CAN	Tarrah Harvey / Keith Gagnon	120	2006/2007 season (100%)	0	0	0	0	0
121	CAN	Tarrah Harvey / Keith Gagnon	120	2005/2006 season (70%)	0	0	0	0	0
121	FRA	Camille Laure Pradier / Clement Dourval	120	2007/2008 season (100%)	0	120	0	0	0
121	FRA	Camille Laure Pradier / Clement Dourval	120	2006/2007 season (100%)	0	0	0	0	0
121	FRA	Camille Laure Pradier / Clement Dourval	120	2005/2006 season (70%)	0	0	0	0	0
125	HUN	Dora Turoczi / Balazs Major	108	2007/2008 season (100%)	0	108	0	0	0
125	HUN	Dora Turoczi / Balazs Major	108	2006/2007 season (100%)	0	0	0	0	0
125	HUN	Dora Turoczi / Balazs Major	108	2005/2006 season (70%)	0	0	0	0	0
125	CAN	Maja Vermeulen / Andrew Doleman	108	2007/2008 season (100%)	0	108	0	0	0
125	CAN	Maja Vermeulen / Andrew Doleman	108	2006/2007 season (100%)	0	0	0	0	0
125	CAN	Maja Vermeulen / Andrew Doleman	108	2005/2006 season (70%)	0	0	0	0	0
125	CAN	Krista Wolfenden / Justin Trojek	108	2007/2008 season (100%)	0	108	0	0	0
125	CAN	Krista Wolfenden / Justin Trojek	108	2006/2007 season (100%)	0	0	0	0	0
125	CAN	Krista Wolfenden / Justin Trojek	108	2005/2006 season (70%)	0	0	0	0	0
128	CHN	Xueting Guan / Meng Wang	107	2007/2008 season (100%)	107	0	0	0	0
128	CHN	Xueting Guan / Meng Wang	107	2006/2007 season (100%)	0	0	0	0	0
128	CHN	Xueting Guan / Meng Wang	107	2005/2006 season (70%)	0	0	0	0	0
129	GBR	Penny Coomes / Nicholas Buckland	97	2007/2008 season (100%)	0	97	0	0	0
129	GBR	Penny Coomes / Nicholas Buckland	97	2006/2007 season (100%)	0	0	0	0	0
129	GBR	Penny Coomes / Nicholas Buckland	97	2005/2006 season (70%)	0	0	0	0	0
129	UKR	Elena Chigidina / Vitali Nikiforov	97	2007/2008 season (100%)	0	97	0	0	0
129	UKR	Elena Chigidina / Vitali Nikiforov	97	2006/2007 season (100%)	0	0	0	0	0
129	UKR	Elena Chigidina / Vitali Nikiforov	97	2005/2006 season (70%)	0	0	0	0	0
129	CAN	Natalie Feigin / Jason Cusmariu	97	2007/2008 season (100%)	0	97	0	0	0
129	CAN	Natalie Feigin / Jason Cusmariu	97	2006/2007 season (100%)	0	0	0	0	0
129	CAN	Natalie Feigin / Jason Cusmariu	97	2005/2006 season (70%)	0	0	0	0	0
129	FRA	Fanny Regnier / Antoine Charrier	97	2007/2008 season (100%)	0	0	0	0	0
129	FRA	Fanny Regnier / Antoine Charrier	97	2006/2007 season (100%)	0	97	0	0	0
129	FRA	Fanny Regnier / Antoine Charrier	97	2005/2006 season (70%)	0	0	0	0	0
129	CAN	Sabryna Rettino / Dominique Dupuis	97	2007/2008 season (100%)	0	0	0	0	0
129	CAN	Sabryna Rettino / Dominique Dupuis	97	2006/2007 season (100%)	0	97	0	0	0
129	CAN	Sabryna Rettino / Dominique Dupuis	97	2005/2006 season (70%)	0	0	0	0	0
134	UKR	Elena Georgieva / Mikhail Tikhonravov	93	2007/2008 season (100%)	0	0	0	0	0
134	UKR	Elena Georgieva / Mikhail Tikhonravov	93	2006/2007 season (100%)	0	0	0	0	0
134	UKR	Elena Georgieva / Mikhail Tikhonravov	93	2005/2006 season (70%)	0	93	0	0	0
135	BLR	Ksenia Shmirina / Egor Maistrov	92	2007/2008 season (100%)	92	0	0	0	0
135	BLR	Ksenia Shmirina / Egor Maistrov	92	2006/2007 season (100%)	0	0	0	0	0
135	BLR	Ksenia Shmirina / Egor Maistrov	92	2005/2006 season (70%)	0	0	0	0	0
135	SUI	Nora Von Bergen / David Defazio	92	2007/2008 season (100%)	0	0	0	0	0
135	SUI	Nora Von Bergen / David Defazio	92	2006/2007 season (100%)	92	0	0	0	0
135	SUI	Nora Von Bergen / David Defazio	92	2005/2006 season (70%)	0	0	0	0	0
137	SUI	Ramona Elsener / Florian Roost	87	2007/2008 season (100%)	0	0	0	0	0
137	SUI	Ramona Elsener / Florian Roost	87	2006/2007 season (100%)	87	0	0	0	0
137	SUI	Ramona Elsener / Florian Roost	87	2005/2006 season (70%)	0	0	0	0	0
137	DEN	Barbora Heroldova / Nikolaj Sørensen	87	2007/2008 season (100%)	87	0	0	0	0
137	DEN	Barbora Heroldova / Nikolaj Sørensen	87	2006/2007 season (100%)	0	0	0	0	0
137	DEN	Barbora Heroldova / Nikolaj Sørensen	87	2005/2006 season (70%)	0	0	0	0	0
139	FRA	Clemence Chevalier / Clement Perrigouard	84	2007/2008 season (100%)	0	0	0	0	0
139	FRA	Clemence Chevalier / Clement Perrigouard	84	2006/2007 season (100%)	0	0	0	0	0
139	FRA	Clemence Chevalier / Clement Perrigouard	84	2005/2006 season (70%)	0	84	0	0	0
140	EST	Kristina Kiudmaa / Aleksei Trohlev	83	2007/2008 season (100%)	83	0	0	0	0
140	EST	Kristina Kiudmaa / Aleksei Trohlev	83	2006/2007 season (100%)	0	0	0	0	0
140	EST	Kristina Kiudmaa / Aleksei Trohlev	83	2005/2006 season (70%)	0	0	0	0	0
141	FIN	Oksana Klimova / Sasha Palomäki	70	2007/2008 season (100%)	70	0	0	0	0
141	FIN	Oksana Klimova / Sasha Palomäki	70	2006/2007 season (100%)	0	0	0	0	0
141	FIN	Oksana Klimova / Sasha Palomäki	70	2005/2006 season (70%)	0	0	0	0	0
142	POL	Milena Szymczyk / Maciej Bernadowski	68	2007/2008 season (100%)	0	0	0	0	0
142	POL	Milena Szymczyk / Maciej Bernadowski	68	2006/2007 season (100%)	0	0	0	0	0
142	POL	Milena Szymczyk / Maciej Bernadowski	68	2005/2006 season (70%)	0	68	0	0	0
143	BUL	Ina Demireva / Juri Kurakin	63	2007/2008 season (100%)	63	0	0	0	0
143	BUL	Ina Demireva / Juri Kurakin	63	2006/2007 season (100%)	0	0	0	0	0
143	BUL	Ina Demireva / Juri Kurakin	63	2005/2006 season (70%)	0	0	0	0	0

== See also ==
- ISU World Standings
- 2007–08 figure skating season
