= 2009 European Figure Skating Championships =

Sports competition

- Type: ISU Championship
- Date: 20 January – 25
- Season: 2008–09
- Location: Helsinki, Finland
- Venue: Hartwall Areena

Champions
- Men's singles: (France) Brian Joubert
- Ladies' singles: (Finland) Laura Lepistö
- Pairs: (Germany) Aliona Savchenko / Robin Szolkowy
- Ice dance: (Russia) Jana Khokhlova / Sergei Novitski
- Previous: 2008 European Championships
- Next: 2010 European Championships

The 2009 European Figure Skating Championships was a senior international figure skating competition in the 2008–09 season. Medals were awarded in the disciplines of men's singles, ladies' singles, pair skating, and ice dancing. The event was held from 20 to 25 January 2009 at the Hartwall Areena in Helsinki, Finland.

== Qualification ==
The competition was open to skaters from European ISU member nations who had reached the age of 15 before 1 July 2008. The corresponding competition for non-European skaters was the 2009 Four Continents Championships. National associations selected their entries based on their own criteria. Based on the results of the 2008 European Championships, each country was allowed between one and three entries per discipline. The following countries earned more than the minimum.

Spots	Men	Ladies	Pairs	Dance
3	France; Russia; Sweden	Finland; Italy	Germany; Russia	France; Italy; Russia
2	Belarus; Belgium; Czech Republic; Germany; Switzerland	Georgia; United Kingdom; Hungary; Russia; Switzerland	France; United Kingdom; Italy; Poland; Ukraine	Azerbaijan; United Kingdom; Israel; Ukraine

== Competition notes ==
Brian Joubert won his third European title, as did Aliona Savchenko / Robin Szolkowy in the pairs event. It was the first time at the top of the podium for Laura Lepistö and Jana Khokhlova / Sergei Novitski.

Lepistö became the first Finn to win the ladies' single title, and second overall after Susanna Rahkamo / Petri Kokko's 1995 ice dancing title. With Susanna Pöykiö winning bronze, it was also the first time Finns took two spots on the European podium.

== Results ==
=== Men ===
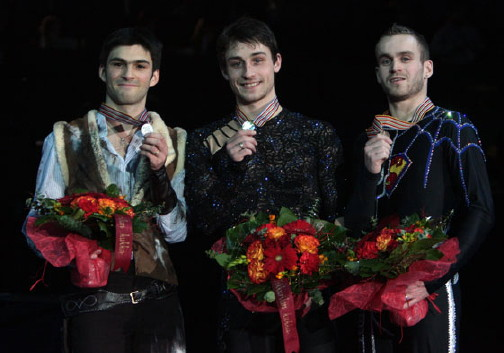
The men's podium. From left: Samuel Contesti (2nd), Brian Joubert (1st), Kevin van der Perren (3rd).

Rank	Name	Nation	Total points	SP		FS	
1	Brian Joubert	France	232.01	1	86.90	2	145.11
2	Samuel Contesti	Italy	220.92	3	75.95	3	144.97
3	Kevin van der Perren	Belgium	219.36	4	75.80	4	143.56
4	Yannick Ponsero	France	219.30	9	67.45	1	151.85
5	Alban Préaubert	France	212.22	5	73.50	5	138.72
6	Tomáš Verner	Czech Republic	207.98	2	81.45	7	126.53
7	Andrei Lutai	Russia	200.57	8	67.75	6	132.82
8	Kristoffer Berntsson	Sweden	186.15	7	68.19	10	117.96
9	Sergei Voronov	Russia	184.96	6	71.29	13	113.67
10	Michal Březina	Czech Republic	183.19	17	59.35	8	123.84
11	Javier Fernández	Spain	182.91	12	65.75	11	117.16
12	Jamal Othman	Switzerland	178.79	20	57.50	9	121.29
13	Artem Borodulin	Russia	175.99	15	61.77	12	114.22
14	Ari-Pekka Nurmenkari	Finland	170.88	10	66.64	19	104.24
15	Peter Liebers	Germany	170.85	14	62.19	16	108.66
16	Igor Macypura	Slovakia	169.76	19	59.20	14	110.56
17	Przemysław Domański	Poland	165.24	16	60.03	18	105.21
18	Adrian Schultheiss	Sweden	164.27	11	66.45	21	97.82
19	Anton Kovalevski	Ukraine	164.03	13	63.35	20	100.68
20	Clemens Brummer	Germany	159.58	22	53.47	17	106.11
21	Gregor Urbas	Slovenia	157.98	24	49.23	15	108.75
22	Alexander Majorov	Sweden	152.03	18	59.24	23	92.79
23	Boris Martinec	Croatia	150.80	21	54.80	22	96.00
24	Elliot Hilton	United Kingdom	139.69	23	51.15	24	88.54
Did not advance to free skating
25	Ruben Blommaert	Belgium		25	49.14		
26	Maxim Shipov	Israel		26	48.39		
27	Kutay Eryoldas	Turkey		27	48.19		
28	Damjan Ostojič	Bosnia and Herzegovina		28	47.09		
29	Viktor Pfeifer	Austria		29	45.65		
30	Georgi Kenchadze	Bulgaria		30	43.66		
31	Alexandr Kazakov	Belarus		31	42.70		
32	Dmitri Kagirov	Belarus		32	41.94		
33	Tomi Pulkkinen	Switzerland		33	41.84		
34	Zoltán Kelemen	Romania		34	41.74		
35	Tigran Vardanjan	Hungary		35	39.46		
36	Boyito Mulder	Netherlands		36	39.39		
37	Saulius Ambrulevičius	Lithuania		37	36.96		
38	Beka Shankulashvili	Georgia		38	36.31		
39	Gegham Vardanyan	Armenia		39	33.37		

=== Ladies ===
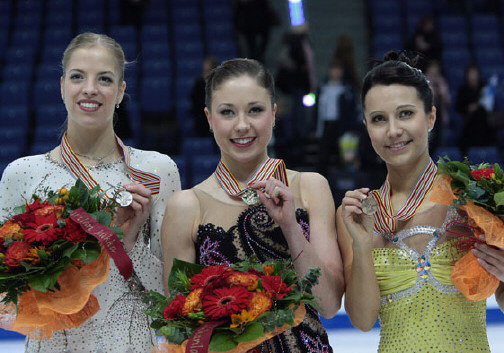
The ladies podium. From left: Carolina Kostner (2nd), Laura Lepistö (1st), Susanna Pöykiö (3rd).

Rank	Name	Nation	Total points	SP		FS	
1	Laura Lepistö	Finland	167.32	1	56.62	2	110.70
2	Carolina Kostner	Italy	165.42	3	51.36	1	114.06
3	Susanna Pöykiö	Finland	156.31	2	56.06	3	100.25
4	Alena Leonova	Russia	143.99	11	45.08	4	98.91
5	Kiira Korpi	Finland	139.01	7	47.60	6	91.41
6	Katarina Gerboldt	Russia	137.05	5	48.62	8	88.43
7	Annette Dytrt	Germany	136.98	12	44.06	5	92.92
8	Júlia Sebestyén	Hungary	134.47	14	43.32	7	91.15
9	Jenna McCorkell	United Kingdom	131.42	4	50.00	12	81.42
10	Tuğba Karademir	Turkey	130.85	9	46.26	10	84.59
11	Ivana Reitmayerová	Slovakia	130.20	6	48.00	11	82.20
12	Jelena Glebova	Estonia	128.36	13	43.68	9	84.68
13	Candice Didier	France	124.07	16	42.84	13	81.23
14	Nella Simaová	Czech Republic	120.61	10	45.24	17	75.37
15	Francesca Rio	Italy	119.61	17	42.24	15	77.37
16	Stefania Berton	Italy	118.97	18	41.94	16	77.03
17	Viktoria Helgesson	Sweden	118.39	24	37.24	14	81.15
18	Teodora Poštič	Slovenia	114.95	15	43.28	18	71.67
19	Irina Movchan	Ukraine	111.52	8	46.48	20	65.04
20	Kerstin Frank	Austria	104.92	22	39.00	19	65.92
21	Karly Robertson	United Kingdom	104.44	21	40.36	21	64.08
22	Manouk Gijsman	Netherlands	103.28	19	40.72	22	62.56
23	Sonia Lafuente	Spain	101.70	20	40.44	23	61.26
24	Isabelle Pieman	Belgium	96.64	23	38.48	24	58.16
did not advance to the free skating
25	Elene Gedevanishvili	Georgia		25	37.20		
26	Nicole Graf	Switzerland		26	36.04		
27	Roxana Luca	Romania		27	35.40		
28	Noemie Silberer	Switzerland		28	35.18		
29	Erle Harstad	Norway		29	34.66		
30	Emma Hagieva	Azerbaijan		30	33.96		
31	Katherine Hadford	Hungary		31	33.76		
32	Žanna Pugača	Latvia		32	30.90		
33	Sonia Radeva	Bulgaria		33	30.64		
34	Mirna Libric	Croatia		34	27.96		
35	Karina Johnson	Denmark		35	27.54		
36	Beatričė Rožinskaitė	Lithuania		36	27.22		
37	Julia Sheremet	Belarus		37	26.56		
38	Clara Peters	Ireland		38	25.82		
39	Maria Papasotiriou	Greece		39	25.28		
40	Ani Vardanyan	Armenia		40	18.62		
WD	Jenna Syken	Israel					

=== Pairs ===
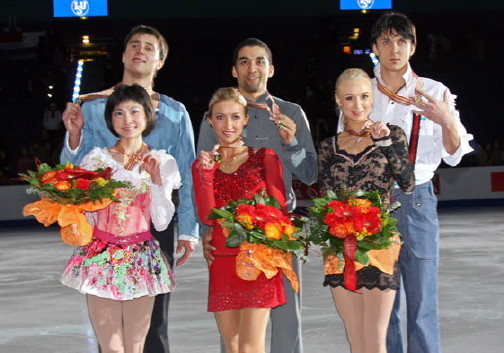
The pairs podium. From left: Yuko Kawaguchi / Alexander Smirnov (2nd), Aliona Savchenko / Robin Szolkowy (1st), Maria Mukhortova / Maxim Trankov (3rd).

Rank	Name	Nation	Total points	SP		FS	
1	Aliona Savchenko / Robin Szolkowy	Germany	199.07	2	66.64	1	132.43
2	Yuko Kawaguchi / Alexander Smirnov	Russia	182.77	3	65.38	2	117.39
3	Maria Mukhortova / Maxim Trankov	Russia	182.07	1	69.62	4	112.45
4	Tatiana Volosozhar / Stanislav Morozov	Ukraine	171.34	4	56.20	3	115.14
5	Lubov Iliushechkina / Nodari Maisuradze	Russia	147.84	5	52.42	5	95.42
6	Nicole Della Monica / Yannick Kocon	Italy	135.33	8	45.50	6	89.83
7	Erica Risseeuw / Robert Paxton	United Kingdom	129.78	10	44.28	7	85.50
8	Maylin Hausch / Daniel Wende	Germany	129.67	9	45.20	8	84.47
9	Adeline Canac / Maximin Coia	France	129.06	7	45.90	10	83.16
10	Vanessa James / Yannick Bonheur	France	127.71	12	43.88	9	83.83
11	Stacey Kemp / David King	United Kingdom	127.47	6	47.98	11	79.49
12	Anaïs Morand / Antoine Dorsaz	Switzerland	120.62	11	43.98	13	76.64
13	Marika Zanforlin / Federico Degli Esposti	Italy	118.52	15	41.42	12	77.10
14	Maria Sergejeva / Ilja Glebov	Estonia	117.00	13	42.38	14	74.62
15	Joanna Sulej / Mateusz Chruściński	Poland	114.96	14	41.94	15	73.02
16	Krystyna Klimczak / Janusz Karweta	Poland	112.20	16	39.50	16	72.70
17	Jessica Crenshaw / Chad Tsagris	Greece	108.09	18	36.78	17	71.31
18	Ekaterina Kostenko / Roman Talan	Ukraine	103.97	17	38.14	18	65.83
19	Gabriela Čermanová / Martin Hanulák	Slovakia	97.21	19	36.76	19	60.45
WD	Ekaterina Sokolova / Fedor Sokolov	Israel		20	36.60		
Did not advance to free skating
21	Nina Ivanova / Filip Zalevski	Bulgaria		21	32.44		

=== Ice dancing ===
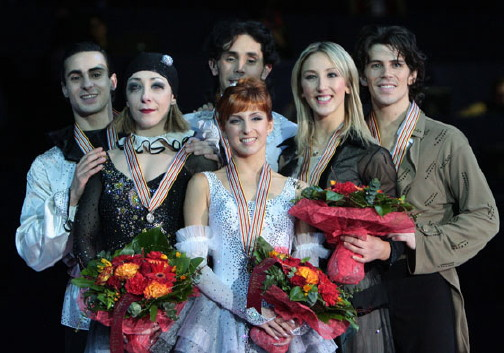
The ice dancing podium. From left: Federica Faiella / Massimo Scali (2nd), Jana Khokhlova / Sergei Novitski (1st), Sinead Kerr / John Kerr (3rd).

Rank	Name	Nation	Total points	CD		OD		FD	
1	Jana Khokhlova / Sergei Novitski	Russia	196.91	1	37.43	1	62.17	1	97.31
2	Federica Faiella / Massimo Scali	Italy	186.17	2	36.03	2	59.03	4	91.11
3	Sinead Kerr / John Kerr	United Kingdom	185.20	3	34.89	3	57.71	3	92.60
4	Nathalie Péchalat / Fabian Bourzat	France	184.84	4	34.38	4	57.56	2	92.90
5	Anna Cappellini / Luca Lanotte	Italy	172.67	7	32.58	6	54.38	5	85.71
6	Pernelle Carron / Matthieu Jost	France	168.03	6	33.21	5	56.18	7	78.64
7	Anna Zadorozhniuk / Sergei Verbillo	Ukraine	160.62	9	30.45	9	50.07	6	80.10
8	Ekaterina Rubleva / Ivan Shefer	Russia	156.43	12	29.04	10	49.97	9	77.42
9	Kristin Fraser / Igor Lukanin	Azerbaijan	156.00	11	29.94	11	49.65	10	76.41
10	Katherine Copely / Deividas Stagniūnas	Lithuania	155.57	15	27.24	8	50.17	8	78.16
11	Alexandra Zaretski / Roman Zaretski	Israel	155.56	10	30.16	7	51.65	11	73.75
12	Carolina Hermann / Daniel Hermann	Germany	146.00	14	28.40	15	45.75	12	71.85
13	Alla Beknazarova / Vladimir Zuev	Ukraine	145.01	13	28.77	13	46.08	13	70.16
14	Caitlin Mallory / Kristian Rand	Estonia	139.03	19	24.22	16	45.70	14	69.11
15	Barbora Silná / Dmitri Matsjuk	Austria	138.46	17	26.10	14	46.02	19	66.34
16	Isabella Pajardi / Stefano Caruso	Italy	138.10	18	24.52	17	45.48	15	68.10
17	Kamila Hájková / David Vincour	Czech Republic	137.87	16	26.66	19	44.00	16	67.21
18	Christina Chitwood / Mark Hanretty	United Kingdom	134.98	20	23.75	18	44.56	17	66.67
19	Terra Findlay / Benoît Richaud	France	131.23	21	23.56	20	43.37	20	64.30
20	Joanna Budner / Jan Mościcki	Poland	128.73	22	22.99	22	39.18	18	66.56
21	Leonie Krail / Oscar Peter	Switzerland	122.19	23	22.88	23	37.90	21	61.41
22	Oksana Klimova / Sasha Palomäki	Finland	120.61	24	21.43	21	39.29	22	59.89
23	Ksenia Shmirina / Egor Maistrov	Belarus	110.85	25	20.91	24	34.38	23	55.56
WD	Nóra Hoffmann / Maxim Zavozin	Hungary	77.96	8	31.13	12	46.83		
Did not advance to free dance
25	Ina Demireva / Juri Kurakin	Bulgaria	48.46	26	17.15	25	31.31		
26	Christa Goulakos / Bradley Yaeger	Greece	45.28	27	15.83	26	29.45		
27	Nadine Ahmed / Bruce Porter	Azerbaijan	42.08	28	15.10	27	26.98		
WD	Oksana Domnina / Maxim Shabalin	Russia		5	33.53				
