= 2008 European Figure Skating Championships =

Figure skating competition

- Type: ISU Championship
- Date: January 21 – 27
- Season: 2007–08
- Location: Zagreb, Croatia
- Venue: Dom Sportova

Champions
- Men's singles: (Czech Republic) Tomáš Verner
- Ladies' singles: (Italy) Carolina Kostner
- Pairs: (Germany) Aliona Savchenko / Robin Szolkowy
- Ice dance: (Russia) Oksana Domnina / Maxim Shabalin
- Previous: 2007 European Championships
- Next: 2009 European Championships

The 2008 European Figure Skating Championships was a senior international figure skating competition in the 2007–08 season. Medals were awarded in the disciplines of men's singles, ladies' singles, pair skating, and ice dancing. The event was held from January 21 through 27, 2008 at Dom Sportova in Zagreb, Croatia.

== Qualifying ==
The competition was open to skaters from European ISU member nations who had reached the age of 15 before July 1, 2007. The corresponding competition for non-European skaters was the 2008 Four Continents Championships. Based on the results of the 2007 European Championships, each country was allowed between one and three entries per discipline. National associations selected their entries based on their own criteria.

== Medals table ==
Rank	Nation	Gold	Silver	Bronze	Total
1	Russia (RUS)	1	1	2	4
2	Czech Republic (CZE)	1	0	0	1
2	Germany (GER)	1	0	0	1
2	Italy (ITA)	1	0	0	1
5	Switzerland (SUI)	0	2	0	2
6	France (FRA)	0	1	1	2
7	Finland (FIN)	0	0	1	1
Totals (7 entries)		4	4	4	12

== Results ==
=== Men ===
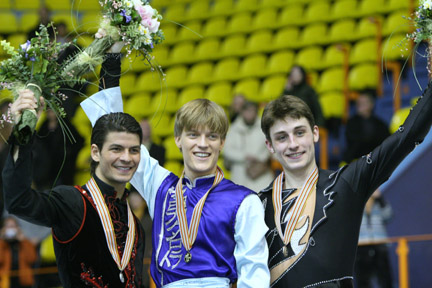
The men's podium. From left: Stéphane Lambiel (2nd), Tomáš Verner (1st), Brian Joubert (3rd).

Rank	Name	Nation	Total points	SP		FS	
1	Tomáš Verner	Czech Republic	232.67	1	79.03	1	153.64
2	Stéphane Lambiel	Switzerland	225.24	3	71.78	2	153.46
3	Brian Joubert	France	219.45	2	75.25	4	144.20
4	Sergei Voronov	Russia	210.13	6	64.26	3	145.87
5	Kevin van der Perren	Belgium	199.57	4	66.33	5	133.24
6	Adrian Schultheiss	Sweden	184.94	8	63.40	6	121.54
7	Kristoffer Berntsson	Sweden	182.45	5	65.62	10	116.83
8	Andrei Lutai	Russia	180.46	9	63.04	9	117.42
9	Sergei Davydov	Belarus	179.90	12	58.63	7	121.27
10	Alban Préaubert	France	178.63	10	60.54	8	118.09
11	Gregor Urbas	Slovenia	176.57	7	63.43	13	113.14
12	Yannick Ponsero	France	172.43	11	59.28	12	113.15
13	Peter Liebers	Germany	165.14	21	50.47	11	114.67
14	Clemens Brummer	Germany	163.81	17	51.26	14	112.55
15	Karel Zelenka	Italy	161.47	13	56.29	16	105.18
16	Michal Březina	Czech Republic	160.37	14	54.13	15	106.24
17	Javier Fernández	Spain	154.10	16	51.94	17	102.16
18	Alexandr Kazakov	Belarus	151.98	18	51.16	18	100.82
19	Paolo Bacchini	Italy	151.39	20	50.90	19	100.49
20	Vitali Sazonets	Ukraine	150.78	22	50.31	20	100.47
21	Konstantin Tupikov	Poland	149.80	15	52.08	21	97.72
22	Moris Pfeifhofer	Switzerland	144.32	23	49.84	22	94.48
23	Manuel Koll	Austria	132.02	19	51.12	23	80.90
24	Josip Gluhak	Croatia	118.37	28	44.52	24	73.85
25	Ruben Blommaert	Belgium	111.34	24	47.38	25	63.96
Free skating not reached
26	Elliot Hilton	United Kingdom		25	46.26		
27	Danil Privalov	Azerbaijan		26	45.93		
28	Mikko Minkkinen	Finland		27	44.66		
29	Alper Uçar	Turkey		29	41.10		
30	Maxim Shipov	Israel		30	40.98		
31	Naiden Borichev	Bulgaria		31	40.02		
32	Luka Čadež	Slovenia		32	38.36		
33	Igor Macypura	Slovakia		33	38.30		
34	Tigran Vardanjan	Hungary		34	35.04		
35	Zoltán Kelemen	Romania		35	34.82		

=== Ladies ===
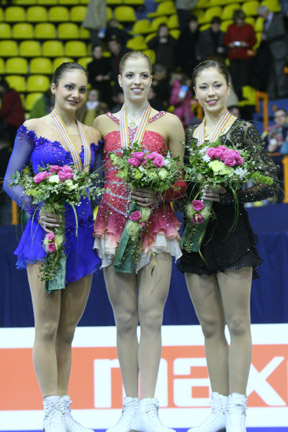
The ladies podium. From left: Sarah Meier (2nd), Carolina Kostner (1st), Laura Lepistö (3rd).

Rank	Name	Nation	Total points	SP		FS	
1	Carolina Kostner	Italy	171.28	1	59.31	2	111.97
2	Sarah Meier	Switzerland	169.44	4	56.44	1	113.00
3	Laura Lepistö	Finland	165.65	3	56.96	3	108.69
4	Júlia Sebestyén	Hungary	162.89	5	55.54	4	107.35
5	Kiira Korpi	Finland	162.22	2	58.60	5	103.62
6	Valentina Marchei	Italy	153.34	6	53.69	6	99.65
7	Elene Gedevanishvili	Georgia	147.09	8	53.43	8	93.66
8	Jenna McCorkell	United Kingdom	145.57	7	53.68	10	91.89
9	Ksenia Doronina	Russia	144.20	10	50.91	9	93.29
10	Jenni Vähämaa	Finland	142.40	12	47.05	7	95.35
11	Tuğba Karademir	Turkey	138.73	11	50.28	11	88.45
12	Annette Dytrt	Germany	132.95	9	51.99	13	80.96
13	Stefania Berton	Italy	130.59	13	46.84	12	83.75
14	Karen Venhuizen	Netherlands	126.30	15	45.53	14	80.77
15	Nella Simaová	Czech Republic	124.39	14	45.64	17	78.75
16	Tamar Katz	Israel	123.41	17	43.77	16	79.64
17	Nina Petushkova	Russia	122.97	19	42.58	15	80.39
18	Viktoria Helgesson	Sweden	121.42	16	44.07	19	77.35
19	Anna Jurkiewicz	Poland	120.76	20	42.55	18	78.21
20	Sonia Lafuente	Spain	119.66	18	43.26	21	76.40
21	Katherine Hadford	Hungary	115.99	22	39.46	20	76.53
22	Roxana Luca	Romania	104.72	23	39.29	22	65.43
23	Viviane Käser	Switzerland	103.83	24	39.06	23	64.77
24	Olga Ikonnikova	Estonia	101.20	21	40.71	24	60.49
25	Maria Dikanovic	Croatia	76.24	40	23.88	25	52.36
Free skating not reached
26	Gwendoline Didier	France		25	37.91		
27	Julia Sheremet	Belarus		26	37.89		
28	Bettina Heim	Switzerland		27	36.73		
29	Ekaterina Proyda	Ukraine		28	35.85		
30	Jacqueline Belenyesiová	Slovakia		29	34.08		
31	Erle Harstad	Norway		30	33.51		
32	Barbara Klerk	Belgium		31	32.99		
33	Denise Koegl	Austria		32	32.28		
34	Sonia Radeva	Bulgaria		33	31.66		
35	Stasia Rage	Latvia		34	30.94		
36	Teodora Poštič	Slovenia		35	30.34		
37	Ksenia Jastsenjski	Serbia		36	30.30		
38	Mérovée Ephrem	Monaco		37	28.34		
39	Maria-Elena Papasotiriou	Greece		38	25.92		
40	Beatrice Rozinskaite	Lithuania		39	24.07		

=== Pairs ===
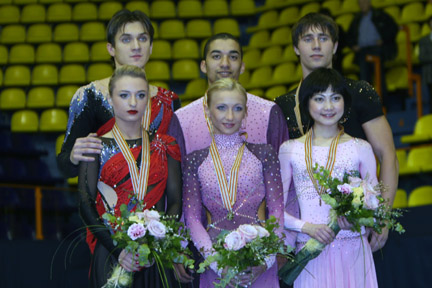
The pairs podium. From left: Maria Mukhortova / Maxim Trankov (2nd), Aliona Savchenko / Robin Szolkowy (1st), Yuko Kawaguchi / Alexander Smirnov (3rd).

Rank	Name	Nation	Total points	SP		FS	
1	Aliona Savchenko / Robin Szolkowy	Germany	202.39	1	70.36	1	132.03
2	Maria Mukhortova / Maxim Trankov	Russia	169.41	2	62.73	2	106.68
3	Yuko Kawaguchi / Alexander Smirnov	Russia	167.25	4	61.25	3	106.00
4	Tatiana Volosozhar / Stanislav Morozov	Ukraine	163.43	3	61.29	4	102.14
5	Arina Ushakova / Sergei Karev	Russia	130.34	5	49.43	6	80.91
6	Stacey Kemp / David King	United Kingdom	129.13	7	46.05	5	83.08
7	Mari Vartmann / Florian Just	Germany	119.86	6	47.23	8	72.63
8	Mélodie Chataigner / Medhi Bouzzine	France	116.48	8	41.97	7	74.51
9	Dominika Piątkowska / Dmitri Khromin	Poland	112.96	9	41.23	10	71.73
10	Marika Zanforlin / Federico Degli Esposti	Italy	112.11	10	40.08	9	72.03
11	Laura Magitteri / Ondřej Hotárek	Italy	109.88	11	39.54	11	70.34
12	Ekaterina Sosinova / Fedor Sokolov	Israel	104.40	12	38.06	13	66.34
13	Ekaterina Kostenko / Roman Talan	Ukraine	103.06	13	36.68	12	66.38
14	Amy Ireland / Michael Bahoric	Croatia	78.44	14	29.50	15	48.94
15	Ariel Fay Gagnon / Chad Tsagris	Greece	72.07	15	20.92	14	51.15

=== Ice dancing ===
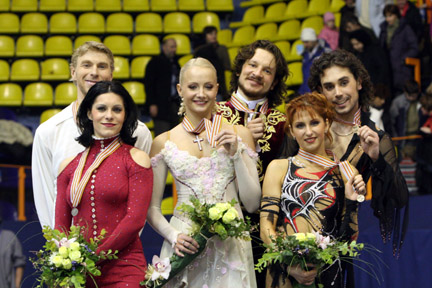
The ice dancing podium. From left: Isabelle Delobel / Olivier Schoenfelder (2nd), Oksana Domnina / Maxim Shabalin (1st), Jana Khokhlova / Sergei Novitski (3rd).

Rank	Name	Nation	Total points	CD		OD		FD	
1	Oksana Domnina / Maxim Shabalin	Russia	207.14	2	40.25	2	61.90	1	104.99
2	Isabelle Delobel / Olivier Schoenfelder	France	205.92	1	41.25	1	62.72	2	101.95
3	Jana Khokhlova / Sergei Novitski	Russia	197.06	3	37.37	3	60.03	3	99.66
4	Federica Faiella / Massimo Scali	Italy	190.95	4	36.87	4	58.79	4	95.29
5	Nathalie Péchalat / Fabian Bourzat	France	185.26	5	34.58	6	56.97	5	93.71
6	Sinead Kerr / John Kerr	United Kingdom	182.06	6	33.55	5	58.54	6	89.97
7	Anna Cappellini / Luca Lanotte	Italy	172.64	10	30.97	7	54.07	7	87.60
8	Alexandra Zaretski / Roman Zaretski	Israel	171.70	7	33.12	9	53.31	9	85.27
9	Pernelle Carron / Mathieu Jost	France	170.62	11	30.15	8	53.52	8	86.95
10	Kristin Fraser / Igor Lukanin	Azerbaijan	168.87	8	33.02	10	52.07	10	83.78
11	Anna Zadorozhniuk / Sergei Verbillo	Ukraine	165.11	9	31.28	12	50.86	11	82.97
12	Katherine Copely / Deividas Stagniūnas	Lithuania	158.98	14	28.81	11	51.29	12	78.88
13	Ekaterina Rubleva / Ivan Shefer	Russia	156.59	12	29.18	13	49.69	13	77.72
14	Alla Beknazarova / Vladimir Zuev	Ukraine	154.02	13	28.90	14	47.92	15	77.20
15	Christina Beier / William Beier	Germany	150.57	16	25.97	15	47.10	14	77.50
16	Barbora Silná / Dmitri Matsjuk	Austria	142.58	15	26.44	17	44.79	16	71.35
17	Kamila Hájková / David Vincour	Czech Republic	141.32	18	24.88	16	45.92	17	70.52
18	Phillipa Towler-Green / Phillip Poole	United Kingdom	135.63	19	24.27	18	42.80	18	68.56
19	Joanna Budner / Jan Mościcki	Poland	132.05	20	22.47	19	42.30	19	67.28
20	Leonie Krail / Oscar Peter	Switzerland	127.61	21	21.50	21	40.13	20	65.98
21	Krisztina Barta / Ádám Tóth	Hungary	126.23	22	21.17	20	40.41	21	64.65
22	Ksenia Shmirina / Egor Maistrov	Belarus	116.63	23	20.25	22	35.36	22	61.02
23	Kristina Kiudmaa / Aleksei Trohlev	Estonia	99.06	25	15.26	24	32.08	23	51.72
WD	Ina Demireva / Juri Kurakin	Bulgaria	51.91	24	17.31	23	34.60		
Free dance not reached
25	Nadine Ahmed / Bruce Porter	Azerbaijan	42.89	26	15.15	25	27.74		
WD	Anastasia Grebenkina / Vazgen Azroyan	Armenia		17	25.41				
