= 2009 World Figure Skating Championships =

2009 ISU World Figure Skating Championships

- Type: ISU Championship
- Date: March 23 – 29
- Season: 2008–09
- Location: Los Angeles, California, United States
- Host: U.S. Figure Skating
- Venue: Staples Center

Champions
- Men's singles: (United States) Evan Lysacek
- Ladies' singles: (South Korea) Kim Yuna
- Pairs: (Germany) Aliona Savchenko and Robin Szolkowy
- Ice dance: (Russia) Oksana Domnina and Maxim Shabalin
- Previous: 2008 World Championships
- Next: 2010 World Championships

The 2009 World Figure Skating Championships was a senior international figure skating competition in the 2008–09 season. Medals were awarded in the disciplines of men's singles, ladies' singles, pair skating, and ice dancing.

Results from these World Championships were used to determine the majority of the spots available for each country at the 2010 Winter Olympics: 24 spots in singles, 16 in pairs, and 19 in ice dancing, with the remaining spots determined at an Olympic qualifying event in the fall of 2009. As every year, Worlds also determined the entries by country for the following year's event.

The event was held in the Staples Center at L.A. Live in Los Angeles, California, USA from March 23 to 29, 2009.

The compulsory dance was the Paso Doble.

== Qualification ==
The competition was open to skaters from ISU member nations who had reached the age of 15 by July 1, 2008. The corresponding competition for younger skaters was the 2009 World Junior Championships.

Based on the results of the 2008 World Championships, each country was allowed between one and three entries per discipline. National associations selected their entries based on their own criteria.

Countries which qualified more than one country per discipline:

Spots	Men	Ladies	Pairs	Dance
3	Canada; Japan; United States	Japan	Canada; China; Germany; Russia	France; United States
2	Belgium; France; Russia; Sweden; Switzerland	Canada; Finland; Italy; South Korea; Switzerland; United States	Ukraine; United States	Canada; United Kingdom; Israel; Italy; Russia

== Schedule ==
(Local time, UTC-7)

- Tuesday, March 24
  - 13:00 - 17:05 Compulsory dance
  - 18:15 - 18:40 Opening ceremonies
  - 19:00 - 23:40 Pairs' short program
- Wednesday, March 25
  - 09:00 - 12:55 Men's short program (1st Half)
  - 13:30 - 18:20 Men's short program (2nd Half)
  - 19:00 - 23:00 Pairs' free skating
- Thursday, March 26
  - 12:30 - 16:50 Original dance
  - 17:35 - 21:45 Men's free skating
- Friday, March 27
  - 08:45 - 12:50 Ladies' short program (1st Half)
  - 13:20 - 17:30 Ladies' short program (2nd Half)
  - 18:30 - 23:00 Free dance
- Saturday, March 28
  - 16:00 - 20:00 Ladies' free skating
- Sunday, March 29
  - 14:00 - 16:30 Gala Exhibition

== Competition notes ==
It was the first time that skaters represented Montenegro at an ISU Championship and the first time skaters represented Brazil and Ireland at the World Championships.

Kim Yuna set an ISU world record of 76.12 points for the ladies short program and a world record of 207.71 points for the ladies overall score.

In the men's short program, Sergei Voronov and Jeremy Abbott tied with a total score of 72.15. The tie was broken by the technical mark and so Voronov placed 9th in that segment and Abbott 10th.

It was the second year in a row that the world champion did not attempt or complete a quadruple jump, leading to continued criticism from bronze medalist Brian Joubert. Patrick Chan, the silver medalist, would then criticize Joubert, saying he was only concerned about quads and not the whole program. See also quadruple jump controversy for more.

== Results ==
=== Men's singles ===
Evan Lysacek became the first American to win since Todd Eldredge in 1996. His victory was described as unexpected, since he was not able to attempt a quadruple jump due to injury.

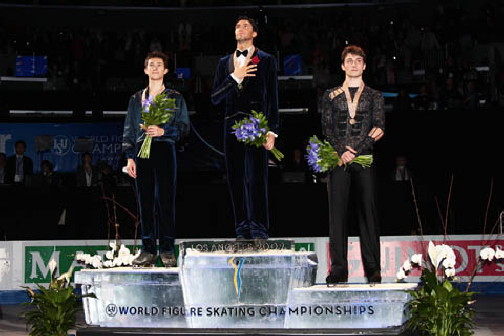
The men's podium. From left: Patrick Chan (2nd), Evan Lysacek (1st), Brian Joubert (3rd).

==== Men's short program ====
Pl.	Name	Nation	TSS	TES	PCS	SS	TR	PE	CH	IN
1	Brian Joubert	France	84.40	46.00	38.40	7.80	7.30	7.75	7.70	7.85
2	Evan Lysacek	United States	82.70	44.40	38.30	7.80	7.35	7.70	7.70	7.75
3	Patrick Chan	Canada	82.55	45.60	36.95	7.55	7.15	7.50	7.35	7.40
4	Tomáš Verner	Czech Republic	80.36	44.06	36.30	7.40	6.95	7.35	7.15	7.45
5	Takahiko Kozuka	Japan	79.35	44.20	35.15	7.35	6.90	6.95	7.05	6.90
6	Samuel Contesti	Italy	78.50	44.50	34.00	6.85	6.40	6.85	6.90	7.00
7	Nobunari Oda	Japan	76.49	41.94	35.55	7.35	6.85	7.15	7.10	7.10
8	Brandon Mroz	United States	76.10	42.30	33.80	6.95	6.45	6.80	6.85	6.75
9	Sergei Voronov	Russia	72.15	40.40	31.75	6.55	6.05	6.40	6.40	6.35
10	Jeremy Abbott	United States	72.15	35.70	36.45	7.35	7.10	7.30	7.25	7.45
11	Yannick Ponsero	France	71.83	38.28	33.55	6.90	6.45	6.70	6.75	6.75
12	Vaughn Chipeur	Canada	70.45	38.20	32.25	6.70	6.10	6.50	6.50	6.45
13	Takahito Mura	Japan	70.35	39.10	31.25	6.55	6.00	6.20	6.25	6.25
14	Kevin van der Perren	Belgium	70.15	36.60	33.55	6.95	6.50	6.65	6.80	6.65
15	Andrei Lutai	Russia	68.95	39.10	29.85	6.20	5.60	6.05	5.95	6.05
16	Kristoffer Berntsson	Sweden	68.61	36.66	31.95	6.50	6.05	6.40	6.50	6.50
17	Denis Ten	Kazakhstan	68.54	38.24	30.30	6.10	5.65	6.15	6.15	6.25
18	Adrian Schultheiss	Sweden	65.20	35.90	29.30	6.15	5.60	5.90	5.85	5.80
19	Anton Kovalevski	Ukraine	64.28	39.48	25.80	5.45	4.75	5.10	5.20	5.30
20	Javier Fernández	Spain	63.75	35.40	28.35	5.85	5.30	5.70	5.75	5.75
21	Jeremy Ten	Canada	60.90	31.10	30.80	6.40	5.85	6.15	6.25	6.15
22	Gregor Urbas	Slovenia	58.70	32.80	25.90	5.50	5.05	5.10	5.20	5.05
23	Igor Macypura	Slovakia	58.30	32.50	26.80	5.60	5.10	5.35	5.40	5.35
24	Przemysław Domański	Poland	57.00	33.80	23.20	5.00	4.45	4.50	4.70	4.55
25	Peter Liebers	Germany	56.73	30.88	25.85	5.50	4.90	5.10	5.20	5.15
26	Jamal Othman	Switzerland	56.32	29.12	27.20	5.70	5.20	5.50	5.50	5.30
27	Ari-Pekka Nurmenkari	Finland	55.60	31.50	24.10	5.10	4.55	4.75	4.90	4.80
28	Wu Jialiang	China	55.43	29.28	27.15	5.75	5.20	5.40	5.50	5.30
29	Viktor Pfeifer	Austria	54.01	28.86	25.15	5.30	4.70	5.05	5.05	5.05
30	Elliot Hilton	United Kingdom	53.35	30.70	22.65	4.85	4.30	4.50	4.55	4.45
31	Tigran Vardanjan	Hungary	53.15	31.30	21.85	4.40	4.10	4.40	4.45	4.50
32	Zoltan Kelemen	Romania	49.34	29.94	20.40	4.25	3.75	4.00	4.25	4.15
33	Damjan Ostojič	Bosnia and Herzegovina	47.27	27.12	20.15	4.35	3.70	3.95	4.10	4.05
34	Luis Hernández	Mexico	46.11	24.86	21.25	4.50	3.95	4.25	4.35	4.20
35	Alper Uçar	Turkey	45.57	25.02	20.55	4.25	3.75	4.15	4.20	4.20
36	Maxim Shipov	Israel	44.85	25.20	20.65	4.40	3.85	4.15	4.15	4.10
37	Kevin Alves	Brazil	44.51	24.26	21.25	4.25	3.90	4.40	4.35	4.35
38	Charles Shou-San Pao	Chinese Taipei	43.89	25.64	19.25	4.25	3.50	3.85	3.90	3.75
39	Kim Min-seok	South Korea	43.28	24.88	19.40	4.30	3.60	3.95	3.80	3.75
40	Beka Shankulashvili	Georgia	42.80	25.60	17.20	3.85	3.20	3.40	3.45	3.30
41	Boris Martinec	Croatia	42.37	21.82	20.55	4.25	3.80	4.10	4.25	4.15
42	Mikael Redin	Switzerland	42.29	23.84	19.45	4.15	3.60	3.95	3.95	3.80
43	Alexandr Kazakov	Belarus	40.74	19.04	22.70	4.85	4.30	4.50	4.60	4.45
44	Justin Pietersen	South Africa	40.39	23.14	17.25	3.75	3.25	3.50	3.45	3.30
45	Georgi Kenchadze	Bulgaria	39.90	21.30	18.60	4.00	3.35	3.65	3.85	3.75
46	Mark Webster	Australia	37.35	18.40	18.95	4.05	3.50	3.70	3.90	3.80
47	Andrew Huertas	Puerto Rico	36.91	19.26	17.65	3.70	3.25	3.60	3.55	3.55
48	Gegham Vardanyan	Armenia	34.87	17.32	17.55	3.90	3.25	3.55	3.45	3.40
49	Saulius Ambrulevičius	Lithuania	34.68	17.28	17.40	3.75	3.30	3.45	3.45	3.45
50	Michael Dimalanta	Philippines	27.53	11.98	15.55	3.50	2.85	3.10	3.15	2.95

- TSS: Total Segment Score
- TES: Technical Element Score
- PCS: Program Component Score
- SS: Skating Skills
- TR: Transitions
- PE: Performance/Execution
- CH: Choreography
- IN: Interpretation
- Ded: Deductions
- StN: Starting Number

==== Men's free skating ====
Pl.	Name	Nation	TSS	TES	PCS	SS	TR	PE	CH	IN
1	Evan Lysacek	United States	159.53	80.53	79.00	7.70	7.70	8.10	7.90	8.10
2	Patrick Chan	Canada	155.03	78.93	76.10	7.70	7.45	7.60	7.70	7.60
3	Brian Joubert	France	151.57	75.77	76.80	7.80	7.50	7.65	7.70	7.75
4	Tomáš Verner	Czech Republic	151.35	75.35	76.00	7.65	7.45	7.60	7.60	7.70
5	Samuel Contesti	Italy	148.47	73.67	74.80	7.30	7.15	7.60	7.55	7.80
6	Denis Ten	Kazakhstan	142.89	77.89	65.00	6.65	6.20	6.65	6.55	6.45
7	Takahiko Kozuka	Japan	142.83	72.23	70.60	7.35	6.90	7.10	7.05	6.90
8	Nobunari Oda	Japan	141.67	72.27	69.40	7.30	6.55	7.00	6.90	6.95
9	Andrei Lutai	Russia	136.04	75.14	61.90	6.35	6.00	6.10	6.25	6.25
10	Jeremy Abbott	United States	132.52	60.02	72.50	7.25	7.10	7.15	7.35	7.40
11	Jeremy Ten	Canada	132.26	71.46	60.80	6.30	5.90	6.05	6.05	6.10
12	Vaughn Chipeur	Canada	131.63	66.73	64.90	6.85	6.25	6.45	6.50	6.40
13	Brandon Mroz	United States	131.09	65.89	65.20	6.65	6.35	6.45	6.55	6.60
14	Sergei Voronov	Russia	129.89	66.09	63.80	6.55	6.10	6.45	6.45	6.35
15	Kevin van der Perren	Belgium	128.20	64.50	63.70	6.45	6.05	6.40	6.45	6.50
16	Takahito Mura	Japan	124.62	65.62	60.00	6.40	5.60	6.05	6.00	5.95
17	Yannick Ponsero	France	122.01	58.71	64.30	6.65	6.15	6.45	6.45	6.45
18	Adrian Schultheiss	Sweden	121.23	63.63	57.60	5.95	5.50	5.80	5.75	5.80
19	Javier Fernández	Spain	119.80	64.10	55.70	5.70	5.45	5.70	5.50	5.50
20	Kristoffer Berntsson	Sweden	113.70	55.90	58.80	6.00	5.55	5.80	5.95	6.10
21	Gregor Urbas	Slovenia	109.01	58.81	51.20	5.45	4.60	5.30	5.25	5.00
22	Przemysław Domański	Poland	104.66	55.56	50.10	5.25	4.75	5.05	5.00	5.00
23	Anton Kovalevski	Ukraine	101.45	49.55	52.90	5.50	5.10	5.20	5.35	5.30
24	Igor Macypura	Slovakia	100.56	51.96	49.60	5.15	4.70	4.90	5.10	4.95

==== Men's final standings ====
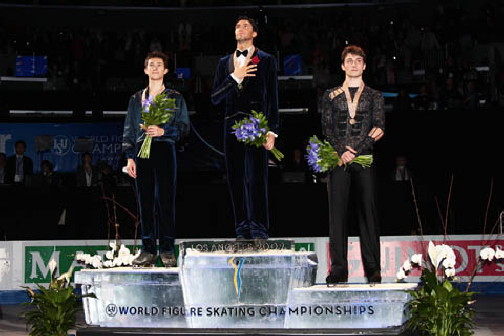
The men's podium. From left: Patrick Chan (2nd), Evan Lysacek (1st), Brian Joubert (3rd).

Rank	Name	Nation	Total points	SP		FS	
1	Evan Lysacek	United States	242.23	2	82.70	1	159.53
2	Patrick Chan	Canada	237.58	3	82.55	2	155.03
3	Brian Joubert	France	235.97	1	84.40	3	151.57
4	Tomáš Verner	Czech Republic	231.71	4	80.36	4	151.35
5	Samuel Contesti	Italy	226.97	6	78.50	5	148.47
6	Takahiko Kozuka	Japan	222.18	5	79.35	7	142.83
7	Nobunari Oda	Japan	218.16	7	76.49	8	141.67
8	Denis Ten	Kazakhstan	211.43	17	68.54	6	142.89
9	Brandon Mroz	United States	207.19	8	76.10	13	131.09
10	Andrei Lutai	Russia	204.99	15	68.95	9	136.04
11	Jeremy Abbott	United States	204.67	10	72.15	10	132.52
12	Vaughn Chipeur	Canada	202.08	12	70.45	12	131.63
13	Sergei Voronov	Russia	202.04	9	72.15	14	129.89
14	Kevin van der Perren	Belgium	198.35	14	70.15	15	128.20
15	Takahito Mura	Japan	194.97	13	70.35	16	124.62
16	Yannick Ponsero	France	193.84	11	71.83	17	122.01
17	Jeremy Ten	Canada	193.16	21	60.90	11	132.26
18	Adrian Schultheiss	Sweden	186.43	18	65.20	18	121.23
19	Javier Fernández	Spain	183.55	20	63.75	19	119.80
20	Kristoffer Berntsson	Sweden	182.31	16	68.61	20	113.70
21	Gregor Urbas	Slovenia	167.71	22	58.70	21	109.01
22	Anton Kovalevski	Ukraine	165.73	19	64.28	23	101.45
23	Przemysław Domański	Poland	161.66	24	57.00	22	104.66
24	Igor Macypura	Slovakia	158.86	23	58.30	24	100.56
25	Peter Liebers	Germany	56.73	25	56.73		
26	Jamal Othman	Switzerland	56.32	26	56.32		
27	Ari-Pekka Nurmenkari	Finland	55.60	27	55.60		
28	Wu Jialiang	China	55.43	28	55.43		
29	Viktor Pfeifer	Austria	54.01	29	54.01		
30	Elliot Hilton	United Kingdom	53.35	30	53.35		
31	Tigran Vardanjan	Hungary	53.15	31	53.15		
32	Zoltán Kelemen	Romania	49.34	32	49.34		
33	Damjan Ostojič	Bosnia and Herzegovina	47.27	33	47.27		
34	Luis Hernández	Mexico	46.11	34	46.11		
35	Alper Uçar	Turkey	45.57	35	45.57		
36	Maxim Shipov	Israel	44.85	36	44.85		
37	Kevin Alves	Brazil	44.51	37	44.51		
38	Charles Shou-San Pao	Chinese Taipei	43.89	38	43.89		
39	Kim Min-seok	South Korea	43.28	39	43.28		
40	Beka Shankulashvili	Georgia	42.80	40	42.80		
41	Boris Martinec	Croatia	42.37	41	42.37		
42	Mikael Redin	Switzerland	42.29	42	42.29		
43	Alexandr Kazakov	Belarus	40.74	43	40.74		
44	Justin Pietersen	South Africa	40.39	44	40.39		
45	Georgi Kenchadze	Bulgaria	39.90	45	39.90		
46	Mark Webster	Australia	37.35	46	37.35		
47	Andrew Huertas	Puerto Rico	36.91	47	36.91		
48	Gegham Vardanyan	Armenia	34.87	48	34.87		
49	Saulius Ambrulevičius	Lithuania	34.68	49	34.68		
50	Michael Dimalanta	Philippines	27.53	50	27.53		

=== Women's singles ===
==== Ladies' short program ====
Pl.	Name	Nation	TSS	TES	PCS	SS	TR	PE	CH	IN
1	Kim Yuna	South Korea	76.12	43.40	32.72	8.45	7.75	8.50	8.05	8.15
2	Joannie Rochette	Canada	67.90	37.50	30.40	7.55	7.35	7.70	7.75	7.65
3	Mao Asada	Japan	66.06	35.90	30.16	7.75	7.15	7.60	7.65	7.55
4	Miki Ando	Japan	64.12	34.40	29.72	7.60	6.95	7.55	7.60	7.45
5	Carolina Kostner	Italy	63.18	33.50	29.68	7.60	7.10	7.40	7.50	7.50
6	Laura Lepistö	Finland	59.66	31.74	27.92	7.10	6.85	7.05	6.95	6.95
7	Rachael Flatt	United States	59.30	32.50	26.80	6.65	6.40	6.90	6.75	6.80
8	Elene Gedevanishvili	Georgia	58.82	31.54	27.28	6.75	6.45	7.10	6.85	6.95
9	Fumie Suguri	Japan	58.40	32.20	27.20	7.10	6.50	6.85	6.80	6.75
10	Sarah Meier	Switzerland	58.36	32.00	26.36	6.70	6.20	6.70	6.65	6.70
11	Alena Leonova	Russia	58.18	32.50	25.68	6.80	6.15	6.50	6.35	6.30
12	Susanna Pöykiö	Finland	57.12	31.60	26.52	6.80	6.50	6.65	6.65	6.55
13	Jelena Glebova	Estonia	55.90	32.70	23.20	5.95	5.45	5.95	5.75	5.90
14	Alissa Czisny	United States	53.28	30.00	25.28	6.60	5.90	6.30	6.40	6.40
15	Cynthia Phaneuf	Canada	53.14	29.30	24.84	6.40	5.65	6.25	6.35	6.40
16	Ivana Reitmayerová	Slovakia	52.98	31.70	21.28	5.60	5.00	5.35	5.50	5.15
17	Kim Na-Young	South Korea	51.50	29.74	21.76	5.80	5.25	5.60	5.45	5.10
18	Annette Dytrt	Germany	51.04	29.64	22.40	5.90	5.20	5.70	5.65	5.55
19	Candice Didier	France	50.16	28.88	21.28	5.60	5.05	5.35	5.35	5.25
20	Anna Jurkiewicz	Poland	45.60	28.60	17.00	4.30	3.85	4.45	4.35	4.30
21	Jenna McCorkell	United Kingdom	45.52	26.44	20.08	5.30	4.60	5.10	5.10	5.00
22	Tuğba Karademir	Turkey	44.24	25.64	19.60	5.15	4.50	5.05	4.90	4.90
23	Kerstin Frank	Austria	43.20	26.76	16.44	4.55	3.65	4.20	4.25	3.90
24	Ana Cecilia Cantu	Mexico	41.58	24.38	17.20	4.30	3.90	4.50	4.35	4.45
25	Tamar Katz	Israel	40.62	21.86	18.76	4.90	4.35	4.80	4.70	4.70
26	Sonia Lafuente	Spain	39.04	21.32	17.72	4.60	4.25	4.50	4.45	4.35
27	Viktoria Helgesson	Sweden	38.98	22.62	18.36	4.85	4.35	4.55	4.55	4.65
28	Chaochih Liu	Chinese Taipei	38.06	23.78	15.28	4.05	3.55	3.90	3.90	3.70
29	Gracielle Jeanne Tan	Philippines	37.74	22.34	15.40	4.00	3.55	4.05	3.75	3.90
30	Nella Simaová	Czech Republic	37.44	21.00	17.44	4.55	4.15	4.45	4.35	4.30
31	Anastasia Gimazetdinova	Uzbekistan	37.38	19.86	17.52	4.70	4.05	4.45	4.40	4.30
32	Emma Hagieva	Azerbaijan	36.76	23.80	13.96	3.80	3.15	3.60	3.45	3.45
33	Cheltzie Lee	Australia	35.46	20.90	15.56	4.00	3.55	3.95	3.90	4.05
34	Irina Movchan	Ukraine	35.06	17.90	18.16	4.90	4.40	4.60	4.50	4.30
35	Teodora Poštič	Slovenia	33.66	20.82	13.84	3.95	3.15	3.50	3.40	3.30
36	Roxana Luca	Romania	33.28	19.24	14.04	3.80	3.25	3.60	3.50	3.40
37	Tamami Ono	Hong Kong	32.70	18.38	14.32	3.80	3.35	3.70	3.55	3.50
38	Zanna Pugaca	Latvia	32.42	19.86	13.56	3.75	3.10	3.45	3.40	3.25
39	Bianka Pádár	Hungary	32.10	20.58	12.52	3.45	2.90	3.05	3.25	3.00
40	Isabelle Pieman	Belgium	32.04	17.04	15.00	3.80	3.50	3.95	3.70	3.80
41	Sonia Radeva	Bulgaria	31.98	19.26	13.72	3.70	3.10	3.55	3.45	3.35
42	Liu Yan	China	31.14	16.54	14.60	3.90	3.35	3.70	3.70	3.60
43	Victoria Muniz	Puerto Rico	30.94	19.30	13.64	3.70	3.15	3.55	3.45	3.20
44	Lejeanne Marais	South Africa	30.92	16.96	13.96	3.65	3.25	3.65	3.50	3.40
45	Charissa Tansomboon	Thailand	29.04	16.72	13.32	3.45	3.05	3.40	3.35	3.40
46	Mirna Libric	Croatia	28.90	16.42	13.48	3.60	3.15	3.40	3.40	3.30
47	Maria Papasotiriou	Greece	28.32	15.28	13.04	3.45	3.05	3.30	3.30	3.20
48	Beatrice Rozinskaite	Lithuania	28.24	16.44	12.80	3.30	2.90	3.35	3.25	3.20
49	Ksenia Jastsenjski	Serbia	27.62	14.98	12.64	3.40	2.90	3.20	3.25	3.05
50	Mérovée Ephrem	Monaco	25.30	13.82	12.48	3.20	2.75	3.30	3.20	3.15
51	Stacy Perfetti	Brazil	25.24	13.16	12.08	3.10	2.75	3.15	3.10	3.00
52	Clara Peters	Ireland	23.64	11.84	11.80	3.05	2.65	3.00	2.95	3.10
53	Yoniko Eva Washington	India	19.68	8.88	10.80	2.65	2.35	2.85	2.80	2.85
WD	Sonja Mugoša	Montenegro	Withdrew from competition							

==== Ladies' free skating ====
Pl.	Name	Nation	TSS	TES	PCS	SS	TR	PE	CH	IN
1	Kim Yuna	South Korea	131.59	63.19	68.40	8.50	8.25	8.70	8.60	8.70
2	Miki Ando	Japan	126.26	62.34	63.92	7.95	7.65	8.15	8.05	8.15
3	Joannie Rochette	Canada	123.39	60.59	62.80	7.70	7.65	7.80	8.05	8.05
4	Mao Asada	Japan	122.03	60.15	62.88	8.10	7.55	7.90	7.80	7.95
5	Rachael Flatt	United States	113.11	58.31	54.80	6.95	6.60	7.00	6.80	6.90
6	Alena Leonova	Russia	110.73	57.53	53.20	6.75	6.30	6.75	6.75	6.70
7	Laura Lepistö	Finland	110.41	53.09	58.32	7.35	7.05	7.30	7.35	7.40
8	Alissa Czisny	United States	106.50	53.86	52.64	6.60	6.20	6.80	6.60	6.70
9	Fumie Suguri	Japan	106.18	51.46	54.72	7.00	6.55	6.85	6.95	6.85
10	Sarah Meier	Switzerland	105.01	50.37	54.64	6.75	6.50	6.85	7.00	7.05
11	Elene Gedevanishvili	Georgia	103.66	50.14	53.52	6.75	6.40	6.75	6.65	6.90
12	Susanna Pöykiö	Finland	96.19	44.47	52.72	6.70	6.40	6.60	6.70	6.55
13	Ivana Reitmayerová	Slovakia	94.43	50.03	44.40	5.75	5.20	5.60	5.60	5.60
14	Cynthia Phaneuf	Canada	92.95	48.51	47.44	6.05	5.75	5.75	6.15	5.95
15	Carolina Kostner	Italy	90.38	32.90	58.48	7.40	7.05	7.15	7.45	7.50
16	Anna Jurkiewicz	Poland	84.69	45.81	38.88	4.95	4.50	4.85	4.95	5.05
17	Jelena Glebova	Estonia	84.12	43.88	42.24	5.45	5.00	5.25	5.35	5.35
18	Jenna McCorkell	United Kingdom	83.15	45.91	38.24	5.15	4.55	4.65	4.85	4.70
19	Annette Dytrt	Germany	80.11	39.35	41.76	5.60	4.85	5.20	5.35	5.10
20	Tuğba Karademir	Turkey	80.07	40.59	40.48	5.10	4.70	5.15	5.10	5.25
21	Kim Na-Young	South Korea	80.00	40.20	40.80	5.50	4.75	5.10	5.20	4.95
22	Candice Didier	France	71.92	39.92	36.00	5.05	4.20	4.35	4.70	4.20
23	Kerstin Frank	Austria	62.53	31.25	31.28	4.40	3.55	3.90	3.95	3.75
24	Ana Cecilia Cantu	Mexico	60.24	31.96	31.28	4.20	3.60	3.90	3.95	3.90

==== Ladies' final standings ====
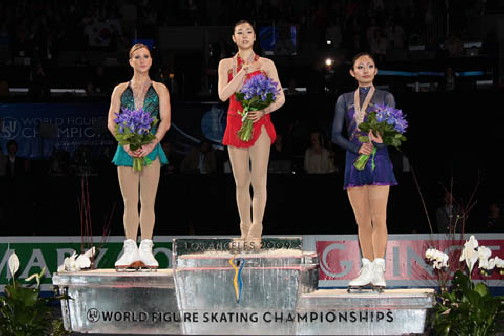
The ladies podium. From left: Joannie Rochette (2nd), Kim Yuna (1st), Miki Ando (3rd).

Rank	Name	Nation	Total points	SP		FS	
1	Kim Yuna	South Korea	207.71	1	76.12	1	131.59
2	Joannie Rochette	Canada	191.29	2	67.90	3	123.39
3	Miki Ando	Japan	190.38	4	64.12	2	126.26
4	Mao Asada	Japan	188.09	3	66.06	4	122.03
5	Rachael Flatt	United States	172.41	7	59.30	5	113.11
6	Laura Lepistö	Finland	170.07	6	59.66	7	110.41
7	Alena Leonova	Russia	168.91	11	58.18	6	110.73
8	Fumie Suguri	Japan	164.58	9	58.40	9	106.18
9	Sarah Meier	Switzerland	163.37	10	58.36	10	105.01
10	Elene Gedevanishvili	Georgia	162.48	8	58.82	11	103.66
11	Alissa Czisny	United States	159.78	14	53.28	8	106.50
12	Carolina Kostner	Italy	153.56	5	63.18	15	90.38
13	Susanna Pöykiö	Finland	153.31	12	57.12	12	96.19
14	Ivana Reitmayerová	Slovakia	147.41	16	52.98	13	94.43
15	Cynthia Phaneuf	Canada	146.09	15	53.14	14	92.95
16	Jelena Glebova	Estonia	140.02	13	55.90	17	84.12
17	Kim Na-Young	South Korea	131.50	17	51.50	21	80.00
18	Annette Dytrt	Germany	131.15	18	51.04	19	80.11
19	Anna Jurkiewicz	Poland	130.29	20	45.60	16	84.69
20	Jenna McCorkell	United Kingdom	128.67	21	45.52	18	83.15
21	Tuğba Karademir	Turkey	124.31	22	44.24	20	80.07
22	Candice Didier	France	122.08	19	50.16	22	71.92
23	Kerstin Frank	Austria	105.73	23	43.20	23	62.53
24	Ana Cecilia Cantu	Mexico	101.82	24	41.58	24	60.24
25	Tamar Katz	Israel	40.62	25	40.62		
26	Sonia Lafuente	Spain	39.04	26	39.04		
27	Viktoria Helgesson	Sweden	38.98	27	38.98		
28	Chaochih Liu	Chinese Taipei	38.06	28	38.06		
29	Gracielle Jeanne Tan	Philippines	37.74	29	37.74		
30	Nella Simaová	Czech Republic	37.44	30	37.44		
31	Anastasia Gimazetdinova	Uzbekistan	37.38	31	37.38		
32	Emma Hagieva	Azerbaijan	36.76	32	36.76		
33	Cheltzie Lee	Australia	35.46	33	35.46		
34	Irina Movchan	Ukraine	35.06	34	35.06		
35	Teodora Poštič	Slovenia	33.66	35	33.66		
36	Roxana Luca	Romania	33.28	36	33.28		
37	Tamami Ono	Hong Kong	32.70	37	32.70		
38	Zanna Pugaca	Latvia	32.42	38	32.42		
39	Bianka Pádár	Hungary	32.10	39	32.10		
40	Isabelle Pieman	Belgium	32.04	40	32.04		
41	Sonia Radeva	Bulgaria	31.98	41	31.98		
42	Liu Yan	China	31.14	42	31.14		
43	Victoria Muniz	Puerto Rico	30.94	43	30.94		
44	Lejeanne Marais	South Africa	30.92	44	30.92		
45	Charissa Tansomboon	Thailand	29.04	45	29.04		
46	Mirna Libric	Croatia	28.90	46	28.90		
47	Maria Papasotiriou	Greece	28.32	47	28.32		
48	Beatrice Rozinskaite	Lithuania	28.24	48	28.24		
49	Ksenia Jastsenjski	Serbia	27.62	49	27.62		
50	Mérovée Ephrem	Monaco	25.30	50	25.30		
51	Stacy Perfetti	Brazil	25.24	51	25.24		
52	Clara Peters	Ireland	23.64	52	23.64		
53	Yoniko Eva Washington	India	19.68	53	19.68		
WD	Sonja Mugoša	Montenegro	Withdrew from competition				

=== Pairs ===
==== Pairs short program ====
Pl.	Name	Nation	TSS	TES	PCS	SS	TR	PE	CH	IN
1	Aliona Savchenko / Robin Szolkowy	Germany	72.30	41.26	31.04	7.80	7.60	7.80	7.75	7.85
2	Yuko Kavaguti / Alexander Smirnov	Russia	68.94	38.94	30.00	7.50	7.30	7.55	7.65	7.50
3	Zhang Dan / Zhang Hao	China	67.42	38.66	28.76	7.35	6.95	7.30	7.25	7.10
4	Maria Mukhortova / Maxim Trankov	Russia	66.88	38.16	28.72	7.25	6.80	7.40	7.20	7.25
5	Pang Qing / Tong Jian	China	65.18	35.78	29.40	7.50	7.20	7.30	7.45	7.30
6	Tatiana Volosozhar / Stanislav Morozov	Ukraine	64.10	37.06	27.04	7.00	6.55	6.85	6.75	6.65
7	Jessica Dubé / Bryce Davison	Canada	61.80	34.28	27.52	7.00	6.65	6.90	6.95	6.90
8	Meagan Duhamel / Craig Buntin	Canada	61.28	35.92	25.36	6.55	6.05	6.45	6.30	6.35
9	Keauna McLaughlin / Rockne Brubaker	United States	53.62	30.10	24.52	6.25	5.75	6.35	6.10	6.20
10	Caydee Denney / Jeremy Barrett	United States	52.74	32.78	19.96	5.10	4.65	5.05	5.00	5.15
11	Mylène Brodeur / John Mattatall	Canada	50.44	29.80	21.64	5.55	5.00	5.60	5.50	5.40
12	Anaïs Morand / Antoine Dorsaz	Switzerland	48.50	30.94	17.56	4.60	4.20	4.35	4.50	4.30
13	Stacey Kemp / David King	United Kingdom	47.74	30.26	17.48	4.40	4.25	4.40	4.50	4.30
14	Zhang Yue / Wang Lei	China	46.68	26.56	20.12	5.35	4.90	4.85	5.15	4.90
15	Maylin Hausch / Daniel Wende	Germany	46.58	28.98	17.60	4.50	4.20	4.45	4.50	4.35
16	Maria Sergejeva / Ilja Glebov	Estonia	46.14	26.98	19.16	4.95	4.55	4.75	4.95	4.75
17	Vanessa James / Yannick Bonheur	France	44.10	27.02	17.08	4.45	4.10	4.25	4.35	4.20
18	Nicole Della Monica / Yannick Kocon	Italy	41.18	24.62	17.56	4.50	4.25	4.40	4.50	4.30
19	Joanna Sulej / Mateusz Chruściński	Poland	40.88	24.40	16.48	4.20	3.95	4.20	4.20	4.05
20	Jessica Crenshaw / Chad Tsagris	Greece	39.70	23.66	16.04	4.10	3.80	4.05	4.10	4.00
21	Ekaterina Sokolova / Fedor Sokolov	Israel	39.62	23.06	16.56	4.30	3.95	4.20	4.20	4.05
22	Amanda Sunyoto-Yang / Darryll Sulindro-Yang	Chinese Taipei	37.04	23.12	15.92	4.15	3.90	3.85	4.00	4.00
23	Nina Ivanova / Filip Zalevski	Bulgaria	34.58	21.18	13.40	3.50	3.25	3.35	3.45	3.20
24	Ksenia Ozerova / Alexander Enbert	Russia	34.06	20.46	16.60	4.35	4.00	4.15	4.30	3.95
25	Marina Aganina / Dmitri Zobnin	Uzbekistan	33.00	19.08	14.92	4.00	3.60	3.75	3.70	3.60

==== Pairs free skating ====
Pl.	Name	Nation	TSS	TES	PCS	SS	TR	PE	CH	IN
1	Aliona Savchenko / Robin Szolkowy	Germany	131.18	68.10	64.08	8.00	7.90	8.10	8.05	8.00
2	Zhang Dan / Zhang Hao	China	119.10	62.58	57.52	7.35	7.15	7.15	7.15	7.15
3	Yuko Kavaguti / Alexander Smirnov	Russia	117.45	59.81	58.64	7.40	7.25	7.35	7.20	7.45
4	Pang Qing / Tong Jian	China	115.90	57.74	58.16	7.35	7.10	7.30	7.25	7.35
5	Tatiana Volosozhar / Stanislav Morozov	Ukraine	111.51	58.47	53.04	6.75	6.45	6.70	6.65	6.60
6	Jessica Dubé / Bryce Davison	Canada	111.02	57.34	53.68	6.80	6.50	6.70	6.75	6.80
7	Maria Mukhortova / Maxim Trankov	Russia	111.01	53.97	57.04	7.15	7.00	7.05	7.20	7.25
8	Meagan Duhamel / Craig Buntin	Canada	104.13	53.93	51.20	6.55	6.20	6.45	6.35	6.45
9	Caydee Denney / Jeremy Barrett	United States	104.10	56.82	47.28	6.05	5.65	6.05	5.85	5.95
10	Mylène Brodeur / John Mattatall	Canada	99.61	56.45	44.16	5.65	5.30	5.65	5.45	5.55
11	Vanessa James / Yannick Bonheur	France	95.24	54.68	40.56	5.15	4.85	5.15	5.15	5.05
12	Keauna McLaughlin / Rockne Brubaker	United States	90.12	44.88	46.24	5.80	5.55	5.85	5.70	6.00
13	Stacey Kemp / David King	United Kingdom	86.99	49.47	37.52	4.65	4.65	4.80	4.60	4.75
14	Anaïs Morand / Antoine Dorsaz	Switzerland	82.96	44.88	38.08	4.85	4.65	4.70	4.80	4.80
15	Maylin Hausch / Daniel Wende	Germany	79.38	41.94	37.44	4.80	4.55	4.70	4.75	4.60
16	Zhang Yue / Wang Lei	China	72.56	38.64	35.92	4.75	4.50	4.40	4.50	4.30
17	Maria Sergejeva / Ilja Glebov	Estonia	70.40	35.16	36.24	4.65	4.40	4.50	4.65	4.45
18	Nicole Della Monica / Yannick Kocon	Italy	67.31	34.99	32.32	4.20	4.00	3.95	4.00	4.05
19	Joanna Sulej / Mateusz Chruściński	Poland	65.66	33.50	32.16	4.10	3.90	4.05	4.05	4.00
20	Jessica Crenshaw / Chad Tsagris	Greece	62.17	36.49	29.68	3.80	3.60	3.65	3.80	3.70

==== Pairs final standings ====
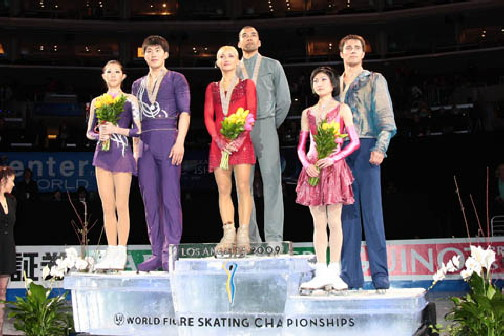
The pairs podium. From left: Zhang Dan / Zhang Hao (2nd), Aliona Savchenko / Robin Szolkowy (1st), Yuko Kavaguti / Alexander Smirnov (3rd).

Rank	Name	Nation	Total points	SP		FS	
1	Aliona Savchenko / Robin Szolkowy	Germany	203.48	1	72.30	1	131.18
2	Zhang Dan / Zhang Hao	China	186.52	3	67.42	2	119.10
3	Yuko Kavaguti / Alexander Smirnov	Russia	186.39	2	68.94	3	117.45
4	Pang Qing / Tong Jian	China	181.08	5	65.18	4	115.90
5	Maria Mukhortova / Maxim Trankov	Russia	177.89	4	66.88	7	111.01
6	Tatiana Volosozhar / Stanislav Morozov	Ukraine	175.61	6	64.10	5	111.51
7	Jessica Dubé / Bryce Davison	Canada	172.82	7	61.80	6	111.02
8	Meagan Duhamel / Craig Buntin	Canada	165.41	8	61.28	8	104.13
9	Caydee Denney / Jeremy Barrett	United States	156.84	10	52.74	9	104.10
10	Mylène Brodeur / John Mattatall	Canada	150.05	11	50.44	10	99.61
11	Keauna McLaughlin / Rockne Brubaker	United States	143.74	9	53.62	12	90.12
12	Vanessa James / Yannick Bonheur	France	139.34	17	44.10	11	95.24
13	Stacey Kemp / David King	United Kingdom	134.73	13	47.74	13	86.99
14	Anaïs Morand / Antoine Dorsaz	Switzerland	131.46	12	48.50	14	82.96
15	Maylin Hausch / Daniel Wende	Germany	125.96	15	46.58	15	79.38
16	Zhang Yue / Wang Lei	China	119.24	14	46.68	16	72.56
17	Maria Sergejeva / Ilja Glebov	Estonia	116.54	16	46.14	17	70.40
18	Nicole Della Monica / Yannick Kocon	Italy	108.49	18	41.18	18	67.31
19	Joanna Sulej / Mateusz Chruściński	Poland	106.54	19	40.88	19	65.66
20	Jessica Crenshaw / Chad Tsagris	Greece	101.87	20	39.70	20	62.17
21	Ekaterina Sokolova / Fedor Sokolov	Israel	39.62	21	39.62		
22	Amanda Sunyoto-Yang / Darryll Sulindro-Yang	Chinese Taipei	37.04	22	37.04		
23	Nina Ivanova / Filip Zalevski	Bulgaria	34.58	23	34.58		
24	Ksenia Ozerova / Alexander Enbert	Russia	34.06	24	34.06		
25	Marina Aganina / Dmitri Zobnin	Uzbekistan	33.00	25	33.00		

=== Ice dance ===
==== Compulsory dance ====
Pl.	Name	Nation	TSS	TES	PCS	SS	TI	PF	IN
1	Oksana Domnina / Maxim Shabalin	Russia	40.77	21.10	19.67	7.85	7.60	7.95	8.20
2	Tanith Belbin / Benjamin Agosto	United States	39.65	20.26	19.39	7.80	7.55	7.75	8.00
3	Tessa Virtue / Scott Moir	Canada	39.37	20.48	18.89	7.60	7.35	7.60	7.75
4	Meryl Davis / Charlie White	United States	37.73	19.30	18.43	7.45	7.15	7.50	7.45
5	Jana Khokhlova / Sergei Novitski	Russia	37.34	19.02	18.32	7.50	7.05	7.40	7.40
6	Nathalie Péchalat / Fabian Bourzat	France	36.54	18.92	17.62	7.10	6.90	7.05	7.15
7	Federica Faiella / Massimo Scali	Italy	36.30	18.58	17.72	7.25	6.70	7.20	7.30
8	Sinead Kerr / John Kerr	United Kingdom	35.30	18.12	17.18	7.05	6.45	7.00	7.10
9	Pernelle Carron / Matthieu Jost	France	34.39	18.22	16.17	6.50	6.25	6.50	6.70
10	Vanessa Crone / Paul Poirier	Canada	33.33	17.46	15.87	6.40	6.05	6.35	6.70
11	Anna Cappellini / Luca Lanotte	Italy	33.30	17.28	16.02	6.40	6.25	6.50	6.55
12	Alexandra Zaretski / Roman Zaretski	Israel	32.85	17.42	15.43	6.25	6.05	6.20	6.20
13	Emily Samuelson / Evan Bates	United States	32.51	16.90	15.61	6.40	6.10	6.20	6.25
14	Kristin Fraser / Igor Lukanin	Azerbaijan	30.35	16.02	14.33	5.85	5.55	5.70	5.85
15	Anna Zadorozhniuk / Sergei Verbillo	Ukraine	30.34	15.54	14.80	6.05	5.60	5.95	6.15
16	Katherine Copely / Deividas Stagniūnas	Lithuania	28.46	15.26	13.20	5.40	5.05	5.35	5.35
17	Lucie Myslivečková / Matěj Novák	Czech Republic	28.29	15.38	12.91	5.15	5.00	5.20	5.40
18	Cathy Reed / Chris Reed	Japan	27.24	14.60	12.64	5.20	4.70	5.15	5.25
19	Zoé Blanc / Pierre-Loup Bouquet	France	27.16	14.86	12.30	4.90	4.75	4.95	5.15
20	Carolina Hermann / Daniel Hermann	Germany	26.65	13.90	12.75	5.25	4.90	5.10	5.15
21	Phillipa Towler-Green / Phillip Poole	United Kingdom	26.38	14.84	11.54	4.70	4.40	4.75	4.65
22	Huang Xintong / Zheng Xun	China	26.11	14.30	11.81	4.80	4.50	4.80	4.85
23	Caitlin Mallory / Kristian Rand	Estonia	25.11	13.76	11.35	4.55	4.35	4.65	4.70
24	Joanna Budner / Jan Mościcki	Poland	23.43	12.70	10.73	4.50	4.00	4.30	4.40
25	Leonie Krail / Oscar Peter	Switzerland	22.32	12.38	9.94	4.05	3.60	4.20	4.20
26	Nikki Georgiadis / Graham Hockley	Greece	21.51	12.24	9.27	3.70	3.45	3.90	3.90
27	Danielle O'Brien / Gregory Merriman	Australia	19.81	10.94	8.87	3.75	3.30	3.50	3.65
28	Ina Demireva / Juri Kurakin	Bulgaria	19.75	10.98	8.77	3.55	3.35	3.60	3.60
29	Emese Laszlo / Mate Fejes	Hungary	18.95	10.46	8.49	3.55	3.10	3.60	3.40
30	Ksenia Shmirina / Yahor Maistrov	Belarus	17.96	9.72	8.24	3.55	3.00	3.35	3.30

- TI: Timing
- PF: Performance

==== Original dance ====
Pl.	Name	Nation	TSS	TES	PCS	SS	MO	PF	CH	IT
1	Tanith Belbin / Benjamin Agosto	United States	65.16	33.90	31.26	8.20	8.05	8.35	8.25	8.30
2	Oksana Domnina / Maxim Shabalin	Russia	64.68	33.40	31.28	8.25	8.10	8.25	8.25	8.30
3	Meryl Davis / Charlie White	United States	62.60	33.30	29.30	7.65	7.60	7.75	7.75	7.80
4	Nathalie Péchalat / Fabian Bourzat	France	61.83	33.50	28.33	7.40	7.25	7.55	7.55	7.55
5	Jana Khokhlova / Sergei Novitski	Russia	61.68	32.30	29.38	7.70	7.60	7.85	7.80	7.75
6	Tessa Virtue / Scott Moir	Canada	61.05	31.90	29.15	7.75	7.55	7.60	7.75	7.70
7	Sinead Kerr / John Kerr	United Kingdom	60.13	32.10	28.03	7.25	7.30	7.50	7.40	7.45
8	Pernelle Carron / Matthieu Jost	France	57.68	30.90	26.78	6.95	6.95	7.00	7.10	7.20
9	Anna Cappellini / Luca Lanotte	Italy	56.33	30.80	25.53	6.60	6.55	6.75	6.85	6.85
10	Federica Faiella / Massimo Scali	Italy	55.92	30.80	27.12	6.90	7.10	7.20	7.25	7.25
11	Emily Samuelson / Evan Bates	United States	54.97	30.90	24.07	6.35	6.05	6.30	6.45	6.50
12	Vanessa Crone / Paul Poirier	Canada	54.75	30.30	24.45	6.45	6.30	6.45	6.55	6.45
13	Alexandra Zaretski / Roman Zaretski	Israel	54.19	30.20	23.99	6.35	6.20	6.40	6.35	6.30
14	Katherine Copely / Deividas Stagniūnas	Lithuania	49.79	28.10	21.69	5.70	5.40	5.80	5.80	5.85
15	Cathy Reed / Chris Reed	Japan	49.58	27.60	21.98	5.85	5.60	5.80	5.90	5.80
16	Carolina Hermann / Daniel Hermann	Germany	48.89	27.70	21.19	5.50	5.30	5.65	5.60	5.80
17	Zoé Blanc / Pierre-Loup Bouquet	France	48.24	27.50	20.74	5.55	5.35	5.55	5.40	5.45
18	Kristin Fraser / Igor Lukanin	Azerbaijan	48.06	26.00	22.06	5.85	5.60	5.90	5.85	5.85
19	Anna Zadorozhniuk / Sergei Verbillo	Ukraine	46.94	25.10	21.84	5.70	5.55	5.80	5.85	5.85
20	Lucie Myslivečková / Matěj Novák	Czech Republic	46.35	26.00	20.35	5.35	5.20	5.30	5.55	5.40
21	Caitlin Mallory / Kristian Rand	Estonia	45.69	26.50	19.19	4.95	4.80	5.20	5.20	5.15
22	Phillipa Towler-Green / Phillip Poole	United Kingdom	43.70	25.90	17.80	4.80	4.35	4.80	4.75	4.75
23	Huang Xintong / Zheng Xun	China	43.48	26.20	17.28	4.70	4.45	4.55	4.55	4.50
24	Danielle O'Brien / Gregory Merriman	Australia	39.70	24.00	15.70	4.20	3.90	4.25	4.20	4.15
25	Joanna Budner / Jan Mościcki	Poland	39.25	22.40	16.85	4.55	4.30	4.50	4.45	4.40
26	Nikki Georgiadis / Graham Hockley	Greece	37.10	22.20	14.90	4.05	3.70	4.05	3.95	3.90
27	Leonie Krail / Oscar Peter	Switzerland	34.46	20.24	15.22	4.05	3.90	3.95	4.15	4.00
28	Emese Laszlo / Mate Fejes	Hungary	34.44	20.30	14.14	3.85	3.70	3.70	3.80	3.60
29	Ksenia Shmirina / Yahor Maistrov	Belarus	33.93	20.40	13.53	3.65	3.35	3.60	3.70	3.55
30	Ina Demireva / Juri Kurakin	Bulgaria	33.14	19.50	13.64	3.60	3.40	3.70	3.70	3.60

- MO: Linking Footwork/Movements
- IT: Interpretation/Timing

==== Free dance ====
Pl.	Name	Nation	TSS	TES	PCS	SS	MO	PF	CH	IT
1	Oksana Domnina / Maxim Shabalin	Russia	100.85	50.70	50.15	8.40	8.20	8.45	8.45	8.40
2	Tanith Belbin / Benjamin Agosto	United States	100.27	50.50	49.77	8.35	8.10	8.45	8.30	8.40
3	Meryl Davis / Charlie White	United States	100.03	51.20	48.83	8.10	8.00	8.15	8.30	8.25
4	Tessa Virtue / Scott Moir	Canada	99.98	50.70	49.28	8.15	8.05	8.30	8.35	8.35
5	Nathalie Péchalat / Fabian Bourzat	France	95.99	49.80	46.19	7.70	7.55	7.70	7.75	7.90
6	Jana Khokhlova / Sergei Novitski	Russia	94.39	48.20	47.19	7.90	7.75	7.95	7.90	7.90
7	Sinead Kerr / John Kerr	United Kingdom	90.64	47.10	43.54	7.25	7.10	7.40	7.30	7.35
8	Federica Faiella / Massimo Scali	Italy	90.54	46.80	44.74	7.45	7.30	7.50	7.55	7.60
9	Emily Samuelson / Evan Bates	United States	87.28	47.10	40.18	6.80	6.50	6.80	6.75	6.75
10	Pernelle Carron / Matthieu Jost	France	86.65	45.10	41.55	6.95	6.75	6.95	6.95	7.15
11	Anna Cappellini / Luca Lanotte	Italy	86.07	44.70	41.37	6.90	6.65	7.05	6.95	7.10
12	Vanessa Crone / Paul Poirier	Canada	85.08	45.40	39.68	6.75	6.45	6.65	6.55	6.75
13	Katherine Copely / Deividas Stagniūnas	Lithuania	81.75	44.50	37.25	6.25	6.05	6.25	6.30	6.30
14	Alexandra Zaretski / Roman Zaretski	Israel	80.49	43.10	37.39	6.35	6.00	6.35	6.30	6.30
15	Anna Zadorozhniuk / Sergei Verbillo	Ukraine	77.21	41.40	35.81	6.10	5.70	5.95	6.10	6.15
16	Cathy Reed / Chris Reed	Japan	74.22	40.70	34.52	5.85	5.55	5.90	5.80	5.80
17	Caitlin Mallory / Kristian Rand	Estonia	72.89	41.90	30.99	5.25	4.90	5.30	5.25	5.30
18	Carolina Hermann / Daniel Hermann	Germany	72.23	38.60	33.63	5.70	5.40	5.70	5.50	5.85
19	Zoé Blanc / Pierre-Loup Bouquet	France	70.68	39.40	31.28	5.40	4.90	5.40	5.25	5.30
20	Kristin Fraser / Igor Lukanin	Azerbaijan	69.04	34.90	36.14	6.20	5.85	6.10	6.05	6.00
21	Lucie Myslivečková / Matěj Novák	Czech Republic	68.35	37.70	30.65	5.15	4.95	5.10	5.30	5.15
22	Huang Xintong / Zheng Xun	China	66.26	38.80	27.46	4.65	4.40	4.75	4.60	4.60
23	Phillipa Towler-Green / Phillip Poole	United Kingdom	65.48	38.60	27.88	4.75	4.45	4.65	4.80	4.70
24	Joanna Budner / Jan Mościcki	Poland	61.90	35.70	26.20	4.40	4.20	4.50	4.50	4.35

==== Ice dancing final standings ====
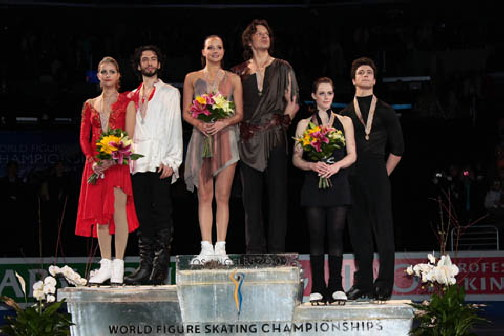
The ice dancing podium. From left: Tanith Belbin / Benjamin Agosto (2nd), Oksana Domnina / Maxim Shabalin (1st), Tessa Virtue / Scott Moir (3rd).

Rank	Name	Nation	Total points	CD		OD		FD	
1	Oksana Domnina / Maxim Shabalin	Russia	206.30	1	40.77	2	64.68	1	100.85
2	Tanith Belbin / Benjamin Agosto	United States	205.08	2	39.65	1	65.16	2	100.27
3	Tessa Virtue / Scott Moir	Canada	200.40	3	39.37	6	61.05	4	99.98
4	Meryl Davis / Charlie White	United States	200.36	4	37.73	3	62.60	3	100.03
5	Nathalie Péchalat / Fabian Bourzat	France	194.36	6	36.54	4	61.83	5	95.99
6	Jana Khokhlova / Sergei Novitski	Russia	193.41	5	37.34	5	61.68	6	94.39
7	Sinead Kerr / John Kerr	United Kingdom	186.07	8	35.30	7	60.13	7	90.64
8	Federica Faiella / Massimo Scali	Italy	182.76	7	36.30	10	55.92	8	90.54
9	Pernelle Carron / Matthieu Jost	France	178.72	9	34.39	8	57.68	10	86.65
10	Anna Cappellini / Luca Lanotte	Italy	175.70	11	33.30	9	56.33	11	86.07
11	Emily Samuelson / Evan Bates	United States	174.76	13	32.51	11	54.97	9	87.28
12	Vanessa Crone / Paul Poirier	Canada	173.16	10	33.33	12	54.75	12	85.08
13	Alexandra Zaretski / Roman Zaretski	Israel	167.53	12	32.85	13	54.19	14	80.49
14	Katherine Copely / Deividas Stagniūnas	Lithuania	160.00	16	28.46	14	49.79	13	81.75
15	Anna Zadorozhniuk / Sergei Verbillo	Ukraine	154.49	15	30.34	19	46.94	15	77.21
16	Cathy Reed / Chris Reed	Japan	151.04	18	27.24	15	49.58	16	74.22
17	Carolina Hermann / Daniel Hermann	Germany	147.77	20	26.65	16	48.89	18	72.23
18	Kristin Fraser / Igor Lukanin	Azerbaijan	147.45	14	30.35	18	48.06	20	69.04
19	Zoé Blanc / Pierre-Loup Bouquet	France	146.08	19	27.16	17	48.24	19	70.68
20	Caitlin Mallory / Kristian Rand	Estonia	143.69	23	25.11	21	45.69	17	72.89
21	Lucie Myslivečková / Matěj Novák	Czech Republic	142.99	17	28.29	20	46.35	21	68.35
22	Huang Xintong / Zheng Xun	China	135.85	22	26.11	23	43.48	22	66.26
23	Phillipa Towler-Green / Phillip Poole	United Kingdom	135.56	21	26.38	22	43.70	23	65.48
24	Joanna Budner / Jan Mościcki	Poland	124.58	24	23.43	25	39.25	24	61.90
25	Danielle O'Brien / Gregory Merriman	Australia	59.51	27	19.81	24	39.70		
26	Nikki Georgiadis / Graham Hockley	Greece	58.61	26	21.51	26	37.10		
27	Leonie Krail / Oscar Peter	Switzerland	56.78	25	22.32	27	34.46		
28	Emese László / Máté Fejes	Hungary	53.39	29	18.95	28	34.44		
29	Ina Demireva / Juri Kurakin	Bulgaria	52.89	28	19.75	30	33.14		
30	Ksenia Shmirina / Yahor Maistrov	Belarus	51.89	30	17.96	29	33.93		

== Medals summary ==
=== Medals by country ===
Rank	Nation	Gold	Silver	Bronze	Total
1	United States (USA)	1	1	0	2
2	Russia (RUS)	1	0	1	2
3	Germany (GER)	1	0	0	1
3	South Korea (KOR)	1	0	0	1
5	Canada (CAN)	0	2	1	3
6	China (CHN)	0	1	0	1
7	France (FRA)	0	0	1	1
7	Japan (JPN)	0	0	1	1
Totals (8 entries)		4	4	4	12

=== Medalists ===
Discipline	Gold	Silver	Bronze
Men	(United States) Evan Lysacek	(Canada) Patrick Chan	(France) Brian Joubert
Ladies	(South Korea) Kim Yuna	(Canada) Joannie Rochette	(Japan) Miki Ando
Pair skating	(Germany) Aliona Savchenko / Robin Szolkowy	(China) Zhang Dan / Zhang Hao	(Russia) Yuko Kavaguti / Alexander Smirnov
Ice dancing	(Russia) Oksana Domnina / Maxim Shabalin	(United States) Tanith Belbin / Benjamin Agosto	(Canada) Tessa Virtue / Scott Moir
