= 2007 European Figure Skating Championships =

Figure skating competition

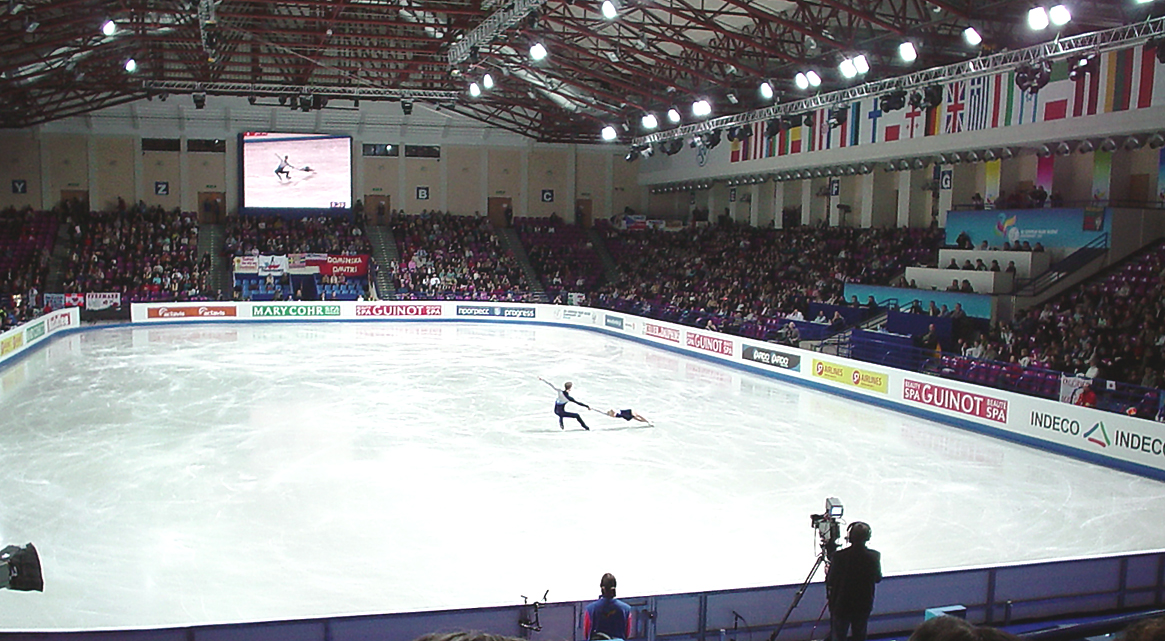
- Type: ISU Championship
- Date: January 22 – 28
- Season: 2006–07
- Location: Warsaw, Poland
- Venue: Torwar Hall

Champions
- Men's singles: (France) Brian Joubert
- Ladies' singles: (Italy) Carolina Kostner
- Pairs: (Germany) Aliona Savchenko / Robin Szolkowy
- Ice dance: (France) Isabelle Delobel / Olivier Schoenfelder
- Previous: 2006 European Championships
- Next: 2008 European Championships

The 2007 European Figure Skating Championships was a senior international figure skating competition. Medals were awarded in the disciplines of men's singles, ladies' singles, pair skating, and ice dancing. The event was held at the Torwar Hall in Warsaw, Poland from January 22 through 28.

== Qualifying ==
The competition was open to skaters from European ISU member nations who reached the age of 15 before July 1, 2006. The corresponding competition for non-European skaters was the 2007 Four Continents Championships. Based on the results of the 2006 European Championships, each country was allowed between one and three entries per discipline. National associations selected their entries based on their own criteria.

== Medals table ==
Rank	Nation	Gold	Silver	Bronze	Total
1	France (FRA)	2	0	0	2
2	Germany (GER)	1	0	0	1
2	Italy (ITA)	1	0	0	1
4	Russia (RUS)	0	2	0	2
5	Czech Republic (CZE)	0	1	0	1
5	Switzerland (SUI)	0	1	0	1
7	Belgium (BEL)	0	0	1	1
7	Bulgaria (BUL)	0	0	1	1
7	Finland (FIN)	0	0	1	1
7	Poland (POL)	0	0	1	1
Totals (10 entries)		4	4	4	12

== Competition notes ==
In men's singles, Brian Joubert won his second European title.

In ladies, Carolina Kostner won her first European title. Sarah Meier (silver) became the first Swiss woman to medal at the event since Denise Biellmann in 1981.

In pair skating, Aliona Savchenko / Robin Szolkowy won their first European title. It was Germany's first gold in the event since 1995 when their coach Ingo Steuer won with Mandy Woetzel.

In ice dancing, Isabel Delobel / Olivier Schoenfelder won their first and only European title.

== Results ==
=== Men ===
Rank	Name	Nation	Total points	SP		FS	
1	Brian Joubert	France	227.12	2	75.18	1	151.94
2	Tomáš Verner	Czech Republic	212.69	1	76.56	3	136.13
3	Kevin van der Perren	Belgium	204.85	4	67.18	2	137.67
4	Sergei Davydov	Belarus	204.78	3	70.14	4	134.64
5	Andrei Lutai	Russia	200.54	5	66.97	6	133.57
6	Alban Préaubert	France	199.95	6	66.10	5	133.85
7	Karel Zelenka	Italy	191.73	8	64.53	7	127.20
8	Jamal Othman	Switzerland	182.14	11	62.82	10	119.32
9	Gregor Urbas	Slovenia	181.07	12	61.70	9	119.37
10	Kristoffer Berntsson	Sweden	177.54	7	64.83	11	112.71
11	Stefan Lindemann	Germany	176.17	17	54.21	8	121.96
12	Yannick Ponsero	France	172.27	10	63.11	13	109.16
13	Anton Kovalevski	Ukraine	172.01	9	63.67	15	108.34
14	Moris Pfeifhofer	Switzerland	163.08	14	57.89	16	105.19
15	Philipp Tischendorf	Germany	162.94	16	54.48	14	108.46
16	Andrei Griazev	Russia	162.23	13	59.10	17	103.13
17	Igor Macypura	Slovakia	159.61	20	49.57	12	110.04
18	Sergei Dobrin	Russia	153.70	15	56.68	19	97.02
19	Pavel Kaška	Czech Republic	145.89	21	47.56	18	98.33
20	Przemysław Domański	Poland	138.67	24	45.84	20	92.83
21	John Hamer	United Kingdom	136.47	18	51.02	21	85.45
22	Boris Martinec	Croatia	134.00	19	50.67	22	83.33
23	Ari-Pekka Nurmenkari	Finland	128.08	22	46.67	23	81.41
24	Sergei Kotov	Israel	124.90	23	46.01	24	78.89
Free Skating Not Reached
25	Alper Uçar	Turkey		25	42.16		
26	Michael Chrolenko	Norway		26	42.13		
27	Manuel Koll	Austria		27	42.00		
28	Javier Fernández	Spain		28	41.73		
29	Adrian Matei	Romania		29	41.38		
30	Naiden Borichev	Bulgaria		30	40.48		
31	Ivan Blagov	Azerbaijan		31	39.46		
32	Zoltán Kelemen	Romania		32	32.70		

=== Ladies ===
Rank	Name	Nation	Total points	SP		FS	
1	Carolina Kostner	Italy	174.79	2	60.46	1	114.33
2	Sarah Meier	Switzerland	171.28	1	60.49	2	110.79
3	Kiira Korpi	Finland	151.19	5	53.84	4	97.35
4	Susanna Pöykiö	Finland	146.02	7	49.47	5	96.55
5	Valentina Marchei	Italy	144.28	12	46.43	3	97.85
6	Alisa Drei	Finland	141.90	9	48.78	6	93.12
7	Elena Sokolova	Russia	139.71	8	48.85	7	90.86
8	Elene Gedevanishvili	Georgia	137.32	3	54.62	9	82.70
9	Júlia Sebestyén	Hungary	136.05	4	53.87	10	82.18
10	Tuğba Karademir	Turkey	131.00	13	46.19	8	84.81
11	Alexandra Ievleva	Russia	126.99	6	50.28	14	76.71
12	Jelena Glebova	Estonia	126.80	10	47.35	12	79.45
13	Tamar Katz	Israel	126.09	11	47.15	13	78.94
14	Lina Johansson	Sweden	120.64	15	44.03	15	76.61
15	Jenna McCorkell	United Kingdom	120.47	20	40.27	11	80.20
16	Idora Hegel	Croatia	119.96	14	44.99	16	74.97
17	Anne-Sophie Calvez	France	116.96	16	43.78	17	73.18
18	Viktória Pavuk	Hungary	110.98	21	39.45	18	71.53
19	Kristin Wieczorek	Germany	110.20	23	39.13	19	71.07
20	Christiane Berger	Germany	109.17	17	43.05	22	66.12
21	Roxana Luca	Romania	108.34	22	39.31	21	69.03
22	Anna Jurkiewicz	Poland	107.31	24	37.44	20	69.87
23	Radka Bártová	Slovakia	105.12	19	40.90	23	64.22
24	Irina Movchan	Ukraine	102.94	18	41.42	24	61.52
Free Skating Not Reached
25	Kathrin Freudelsperger	Austria		25	36.84		
26	Karen Venhuizen	Netherlands		26	35.72		
27	Sonia Radeva	Bulgaria		27	34.61		
28	Ksenia Doronina	Russia		28	34.31		
29	Julia Sheremet	Belarus		29	33.98		
30	Mérovée Ephrem	Monaco		30	31.34		
31	Maria-Elena Papasotiriou	Greece		31	31.26		
32	Isabelle Pieman	Belgium		32	30.19		
33	Ivana Hudziecová	Czech Republic		33	28.46		
34	Melissandre Fuentes	Andorra		34	28.44		
35	Ksenia Jastsenjski	Serbia		35	27.88		
36	Jūlija Tepliha	Latvia		36	24.70		
37	Rūta Gajauskaitė	Lithuania		37	24.34		
38	Kristina Shlobina	Azerbaijan		38	23.97		

=== Pairs ===
Rank	Name	Nation	Total points	SP		FS	
1	Aliona Savchenko / Robin Szolkowy	Germany	199.39	1	65.38	1	134.01
2	Maria Petrova / Alexei Tikhonov	Russia	179.61	2	62.22	2	117.39
3	Dorota Siudek / Mariusz Siudek	Poland	170.91	3	57.81	3	113.10
4	Julia Obertas / Sergei Slavnov	Russia	156.96	4	57.04	5	99.92
5	Tatiana Volosozhar / Stanislav Morozov	Ukraine	155.35	5	53.62	4	101.73
6	Elena Efaieva / Alexei Menshikov	Russia	141.05	7	45.86	6	95.19
7	Mari Vartmann / Florian Just	Germany	132.76	6	47.19	9	85.57
8	Marylin Pla / Yannick Bonheur	France	130.67	12	42.51	7	88.16
9	Laura Magitteri / Ondřej Hotárek	Italy	130.15	9	43.82	8	86.33
10	Dominika Piątkowska / Dmitri Khromin	Poland	122.98	8	45.55	11	77.43
11	Stacey Kemp / David King	United Kingdom	121.06	13	42.11	10	78.95
12	Rebecca Handke / Daniel Wende	Germany	119.25	10	43.56	13	75.69
13	Adeline Canac / Maxima Coia	France	118.90	11	43.07	12	75.83
14	Diana Rennik / Aleksei Saks	Estonia	115.54	14	41.17	14	74.37
WD	Ekaterina Sosinova / Fedor Sokolov	Azerbaijan					

=== Ice dancing ===
Rank	Name	Nation	Total points	CD		OD		FD	
1	Isabelle Delobel / Olivier Schoenfelder	France	199.47	1	39.57	1	60.71	2	99.19
2	Oksana Domnina / Maxim Shabalin	Russia	199.16	2	38.99	2	59.78	1	100.39
3	Albena Denkova / Maxim Staviski	Bulgaria	193.73	3	38.56	3	56.56	3	98.61
4	Jana Khokhlova / Sergei Novitski	Russia	175.76	5	33.46	4	52.59	4	89.71
5	Sinead Kerr / John Kerr	United Kingdom	171.90	6	33.44	6	51.32	5	87.14
6	Federica Faiella / Massimo Scali	Italy	170.26	4	34.53	5	52.41	6	83.32
7	Kristin Fraser / Igor Lukanin	Azerbaijan	157.63	8	29.69	9	48.51	7	79.43
8	Anna Cappellini / Luca Lanotte	Italy	155.28	9	28.92	8	49.78	11	76.58
9	Pernelle Carron / Mathieu Jost	France	152.47	14	26.32	10	46.76	8	79.39
10	Anna Zadorozhniuk / Sergei Verbillo	Ukraine	149.62	10	27.49	12	44.47	9	77.66
11	Alexandra Zaretski / Roman Zaretski	Israel	148.05	12	27.31	11	44.86	12	75.88
12	Ekaterina Rubleva / Ivan Shefer	Russia	147.81	11	27.48	13	43.04	10	77.29
13	Alla Beknazarova / Vladimir Zuev	Ukraine	138.25	13	27.06	14	41.52	15	69.67
14	Anastasia Grebenkina / Vazgen Azrojan	Armenia	136.32	15	25.00	17	40.99	14	70.33
15	Grethe Grünberg / Kristian Rand	Estonia	134.53	20	21.98	15	41.32	13	71.23
16	Nelli Zhiganshina / Alexander Gazsi	Germany	133.20	16	22.91	16	41.09	16	69.20
17	Kamila Hájková / David Vincour	Czech Republic	127.15	19	22.26	19	38.85	17	66.04
18	Katherine Copely / Deividas Stagniūnas	Lithuania	124.53	21	21.14	20	37.77	18	65.62
19	Barbora Silná / Dmitri Matsjuk	Austria	123.56	17	22.80	18	40.84	23	59.92
20	Zsuzsanna Nagy / György Elek	Hungary	120.23	23	21.04	21	36.01	20	63.18
21	Joanna Budner / Jan Mościcki	Poland	119.20	22	21.14	22	35.79	21	62.27
22	Nora von Bergen / David DeFazio	Switzerland	118.81	24	20.47	23	34.99	19	63.35
23	Phillipa Towler-Green / Phillip Poole	United Kingdom	116.06	18	22.31	24	32.74	22	61.01
WD	Nóra Hoffmann / Attila Elek	Hungary	81.47	7	30.64	7	50.83		
Free Dance Not Reached
25	Nicolette Amie House / Aidas Reklys	Lithuania	49.63	25	18.64	25	30.99		
26	Christa-Elizabeth Goulakos / Eric Neumann-Aubichon	Greece	44.73	26	14.78	26	29.95		
27	Evgenia Melnik / Oleg Krupen	Belarus	39.54	27	11.87	27	27.67		
