= Anna Jurkiewicz =

Polish figure skater

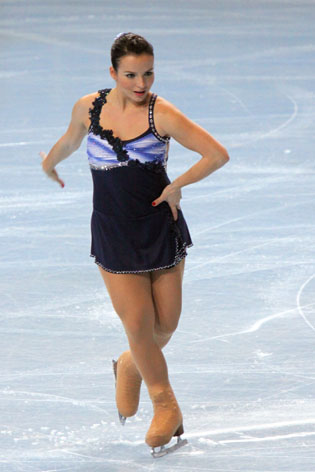
- Jurkiewicz in 2009.

Personal information
- Born: 9 February 1984 (age 42) Oświęcim, Poland
- Height: 1.55 m (5 ft 1 in)

Figure skating career
- Country: Poland
- Skating club: UKLF Unia Oświęcim
- Began skating: 1990
- Retired: 2011

Anna Jurkiewicz (Polish pronunciation: [ˈanna jurˈkjɛvit͡ʂ]; born 9 February 1984) is a Polish former competitive figure skater. She is a three-time (2007–2009) Polish national champion. She qualified to the free skate at four ISU Championships — 1998 Junior Worlds in Saint John, New Brunswick, Canada; 2007 Europeans in Warsaw, Poland; 2008 Europeans in Zagreb, Croatia; and 2009 Worlds in Los Angeles, California, United States;.

Jurkiewicz placed 5th at Junior Worlds in 1998 and the Junior Grand Prix Final in 1999. She became the first-ever Polish skater to qualify for the JGP Final. The next season she suffered a back injury. In the summer of 2004, she temporarily left skating. She returned in April 2006.

== Programs ==
Season	Short program	Free skating	Exhibition
2010–11	Tango de los Exilados by Walter Taieb performed by Vanessa-Mae	Paganini Rhapsody on Caprice 24 by David Garrett	
2009–10	Dark Eyes	Libertango by Astor Piazzolla	
2008–09	Dark Eyes	Once Upon a Time in Mexico by Robert Rodriguez	
2007–08	Shall We Dance	Once Upon a Time in Mexico by Robert Rodriguez	
2006–07	Shall We Dance	La Leyenda del Beso by Raúl Di Blasio	Shall We Dance
2002–03	Scent of a Woman	Selections by Frédéric Chopin	
2001–02	Scent of a Woman	Giselle by Adolphe Adam	
2000–01	Summertime by Leonard Bernstein	Giselle by Adolphe Adam	
1999–2000	Summertime by Leonard Bernstein	Cabaret	
1998–99	Chorus Line	Cabaret	
1997–98	Chorus Line	Ballet music	
1996–97	Charlie Chaplin	Ballet music	
1995–96	Charlie Chaplin		

== Competitive highlights ==
GP: Grand Prix; JGP: Junior Grand Prix

=== 2002–03 to 2010–11 ===
International
Event	02–03	05–06	06–07	07–08	08–09	09–10	10–11
Olympics						30th	
Worlds			31st	34th	19th		
Europeans			22nd	19th			
GP Bompard						10th	
Cup of Nice	2nd		14th	2nd			9th
Golden Spin				7th			
Schäfer Memorial	9th		10th				
Merano Cup				2nd			
Nebelhorn Trophy				7th			
NRW Trophy							18th
Nepela Memorial				6th	17th		4th
National or local
Polish Champ.	2nd		1st	1st	1st	2nd	1st

=== 1995–96 to 2001–02 ===
International: Junior
Event	95–96	96–97	97–98	98–99	99–00	00–01	01–02
Junior Worlds			5th	25th	27th	31st	
JGP Final				5th			
JGP Bulgaria			8th				
JGP France				2nd			
JGP Germany			4th	2nd		5th	
JGP Netherlands					9th		
JGP Norway					11th		
JGP Poland						1st	
Cup of Nice							13th J
Gardena			1st J				
Grand Prize SNP					1st J		
EC, Warsaw						1st J	
PFSA Trophy		2nd J	1st J				
Budapest Cup	3rd J						
National or local
Polish Champ.	2nd J	1st J	1st J	1st J		1st J	4th
