= Sarah Meier =

Swiss figure skater

Sarah van Berkel
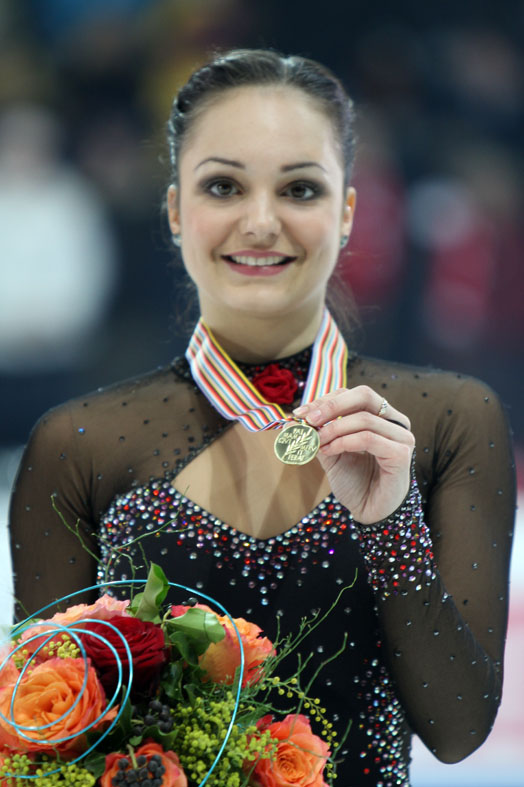
- Meier at the 2011 European Championships

Personal information
- Born: 4 May 1984 (age 42) Bülach, Switzerland
- Height: 1.64 m (5 ft 5 in)

Figure skating career
- Country: Switzerland
- Skating club: Bülacher Eislaufclub
- Began skating: 1988
- Retired: January 2011 (competitive skating), February 15 (show skating)

Medal record
European Championships
Gold medal – first place	2011 Bern	Singles
Silver medal – second place	2007 Warsaw	Singles
Silver medal – second place	2008 Zagreb	Singles
Grand Prix Final
Bronze medal – third place	2006–07 Saint Petersburg	Singles
Swiss Championships
Gold medal – first place	2000 Lugano	Singles
Gold medal – first place	2001 Geneva	Singles
Gold medal – first place	2003 Geneva	Singles
Gold medal – first place	2005 Lausanne	Singles
Gold medal – first place	2006 Biasca	Singles
Gold medal – first place	2007 Geneva	Singles
Gold medal – first place	2008 Winterthur	Singles
Gold medal – first place	2010 Lugano	Singles
Silver medal – second place	1999 Lausanne	Singles
World Junior Championships
Bronze medal – third place	2000 Oberstdorf	Singles

Sarah van Berkel (née Meier; born 4 May 1984) is a Swiss former figure skater. She is the 2011 European champion, a two-time European silver medalist (2007 & 2008), the 2006 Grand Prix Final bronze medalist, and an eight-time Swiss national champion (2000–2001, 2003, 2005–2008, 2010).

== Personal life ==
Meier was born on 4 May 1984 in Bülach, Switzerland. Many members of her family were involved in skating and other ice sports. Her mother has served as an international figure skating judge and her sister has participated in synchronized skating. Her aunt, Eva Fehr, a former figure skater, was her coach. Her father, uncle, and two cousins have played ice hockey.

On 3 August 2018, Meier married Swiss triathlete Jan van Berkel. She gave birth to a son in January 2020.

== Career ==
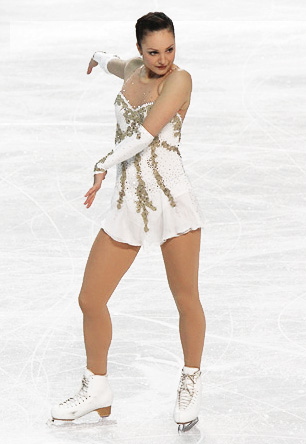
Meier in 2010

=== Early career ===
Meier first stepped on the ice at the age of two years. She liked it so much that her mother sent her to children's courses at the age of four. When Meier was five years old she began taking private lessons and soon started to compete. She landed her first double Axel at the age of ten and performed her first triple Lutz when she was twelve. By the age of thirteen, she could land all of the triple jumps in practice. During the summers, there was no ice in her home town of Bulach so she moved around to Oberstdorf, Germany, and Flims in Switzerland.

Meier made her first junior Grand Prix appearance in 1997, finishing 10th at JGP Slovakia. She continued to skate primarily in the junior ranks through the 1999–2000 season and won the bronze medal at the 2000 World Junior Championships in Oberstdorf.

=== 2000–2001 season ===
Meier began her season competing at junior events; she won medals at two JGP events, including gold in the Czech Republic. She then finished 5th at the 2001 European Championships in Bratislava, Slovakia, and 12th at the 2001 World Championships in Vancouver, Canada.

=== 2001–2002 season ===
In November 2001, Meier twisted her left ankle and tore ligaments, resulting in the loss of three months of training. As a result, she missed her second Grand Prix event and the Swiss Championships. She finished 13th at the 2002 European Championships in Lausanne, Switzerland, and at the 2002 Winter Olympics in Salt Lake City, Utah.

=== 2002–2003 season ===
Meier finished 5th and 7th at her two Grand Prix assignments. She withdrew from the 2003 European Championships due to a foot injury, and finished 19th at the 2003 World Championships in Washington, D.C.

=== 2003–2004 season ===
Before the start of the season, Meier developed tendonitis in her right foot due to new boots and was unable to train from July to December. Making her return to competition, she placed 10th at the 2004 European Championships in Budapest, Hungary, and then 13th at the 2004 World Championships in Dortmund, Germany.

=== 2004–2005 season ===
Meier repeated her tenth place showing at the 2005 European Championships in Turin, Italy, and finished 14th at the 2005 World Championships in Moscow, Russia.

=== 2005–2006 season ===
Meier placed fourth at the 2006 European Championships in Lyon, France; it was the best continental result of her career to that point. She finished 8th at the 2006 Winter Olympics in Turin, Italy, and then 6th at the 2006 World Championships in Calgary, Canada.

=== 2006–2007 season ===
Meier began her Grand Prix season with a fourth-place result at the 2006 Skate America in October. In November, she outscored Hungary's Júlia Sebestyén by 12 points to win the gold medal at the 2006 Cup of Russia. As a result, she qualified to the Grand Prix Final, where she took the bronze medal.

In January, Meier won silver at the 2007 European Championships in Warsaw, Poland. It was the first European podium finish for a Swiss woman since Denise Biellmann won gold in 1981.

=== 2007–2008 season ===
Meier placed fourth at the 2007 Trophee Eric Bompard and won silver at the 2007 NHK Trophy, finishing 1.52 points shy of the champion, Carolina Kostner. In January, she won another silver medal, at the 2008 European Championships in Zagreb, Croatia. She placed 6th at the 2008 World Championships in Gothenburg, Sweden.

=== 2008–2009 season ===
Meier competed in few events in her final three seasons due to a string of injuries. She missed much of 2008–2009 due to spinal disc herniation and muscle problems, although she was able to compete at the 2009 World Championships and earned an Olympic spot for Switzerland with her ninth place showing.

=== 2009–2010 season ===
During the season, Meier struggled with an Achilles tendon inflammation. She withdrew from the 2009 NHK Trophy because she was unable to put too much pressure on her toe pick. She finished 5th at the 2010 European Championships in Tallinn, Estonia, and then 15th at the 2010 Winter Olympics in Vancouver, Canada. After a bad fall in the short program, she failed to qualify for the free skate at the 2010 World Championships in Turin, Italy.

The many injuries Meier had suffered during the latter part of her career led her to consider retirement after the 2009–2010 season, but she eventually decided to remain in the eligible ranks for one last season, mainly in order to compete in her home country at the 2011 Europeans in Bern.

=== 2010–2011 season ===
Meier damaged ligaments in her foot at the 2010 Skate Canada, forcing her to withdraw from the event. The injury occurred on her favorite jump, the Lutz, denting her confidence. Forced to sit out the Grand Prix season and Swiss Championships, Meier announced prior to the 2011 European Championships in Bern that it would be her final competitive event. She ranked third in the short program and second in the free skate, but her combined score was high enough to become the European champion. She reaffirmed her decision to retire immediately following her win, calling it "the right moment to stop... the perfect ending."

=== Post-competitive career ===
In May 2011, Meier announced that she would join Switzerland's "Art on Ice" Production as an executive for its talent team, responsible for talent scouting, looking after members of the team and working with parents, teachers, schools, team experts and Swiss Ice Skating. She is also involved in finding sponsors for Swiss skating.

Meier continued to skate as a pro skater, in shows and other events. She withdrew from the 2011 Japan Open due to swelling in her foot; the ligaments had not fully healed after the 2010 Skate Canada injury. In 2013, she began working as a journalist. In February 2015, she retired from show skating at Art on Ice.

== Programs ==
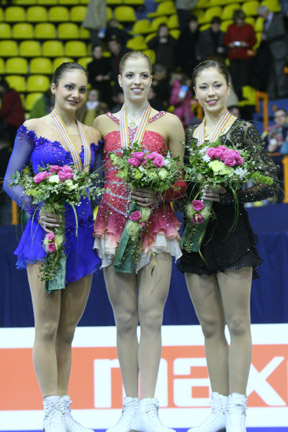
Meier (left) with the other medalists at the 2008 European Championships.

=== Post-2011 ===
Season	Free skating Pro-am events	Exhibition
2016–2017		I Won't Let You Go by James Morrison; The Voice Within by Christina Aguilera
2015–2016		Patch Adams by Marc Shaiman choreo. by Salomé Brunner, Tatiana Druchinina
2014–2015	Amélie Medley by Yann Tiersen	Grow Old With Me by Tom Odell
2013–2014		My Heart Is Refusing Me by Loreen; Silver Lining by Hurts
2012–2013	Not Myself Tonight by Christina Aguilera choreo. by Marvin A. Smith, Salomé Brunner	We Found Love original by Calvin Harris by 2Cellos (from In2ition) choreo. by Marvin A. Smith, Salomé Brunner; An Art on Ice program skated with Kristoffer Berntsson; Cosmic Love by Florence and the Machine; Étude Op. 25, No. 5 by Frédéric Chopin
2011–2012		Stars by Mick Hucknall of Simply Red; Not Myself Tonight by Christina Aguilera performed by Tanja Dankner choreo. by Marvin A. Smith, Salomé Brunner; At Last by Etta James

=== Pre-2011 ===
Season	Short program	Free skating	Exhibition
2010–2011	Samba Para Una Sola Nota by Michel Legrand	Love in the Time of Cholera by Antonio Pinto: White Suit; Raelejo; Divided Love	The Prayer performed by Katherine Jenkins; Amélie Medley by Yann Tiersen
2009–2010	Samba; Brazilliance by Steve Stevens	Romeo and Juliet by Nino Rota; Romeo and Juliet by Sergei Prokofiev	Lisa by Seven; I Got Rhythm by George Gershwin; Samba by Michel Legrand
2008–2009	Samba; Brazilliance by Steve Stevens	La Folia In Black; Red Autumn by Tokuhide Nimi; Yellow River Piano Concerto by Yin Chengzong, Lang Lang	Next Plane Home by Daniel Powter; Here Come the Girls by Sugababes skated with Rory Flack; Amélie Medley by Yann Tiersen
2007–2008	Children's Ward (from Patch Adams) by Marc Shaiman	La Folia In Black; Red Autumn by Tokuhide Nimi	Amélie Medley by Yann Tiersen; La valse d'Amélie; Comptine d'un autre été : L'après-midi; La valse d'Amélie; When You Say Nothing at All by Ronan Keating; Memory (from Cats) by Andrew Lloyd Webber, Trevor Nunn; A Love Like Tides by Lovebugs
2006–2007	Allegro con Spirito (from Concierto de Aranjuez); Movement 2 (from Concierto Andaluz by Joaquín Rodrigo; Allegro con Spirito	Georgiana (from Pride and Prejudice) by Dario Marianelli; The Rain (from Kikujiro) by Joe Hisaishi; Arrival to Netherfield (from Pride and Prejudice) by Dario Marianelli	More Than a Woman by Robin Gibb
2005–2006	Finding Neverland by Jan A. P. Kaczmarek: Impossible Opening; The Kite; Impossible Opening	Bolero for Violin and Orchestra by Walter Taieb performed by Vanessa-Mae	Change by Lisa Stansfield skated with Kevin van der Perren; These Boots Are Made for Walkin' by Melanie Bernhard
2004–2005	Big Love Adagio performed by Bond	Guitarra Latina by Edvin Marton; Instrumental by Carlos Santana; Guitarra Latina by Edvin Marton	A Love Like Tides by Lovebugs
2003–2004	Pure Mood by Spyro Gyra; No Woman, No Cry; Could You Be Loved by Bob Marley and the Wailers; Big Love Adagio performed by Bond	Evita by Andrew Lloyd Webber	Nights in White Satin by The Moody Blues; The Voice Within vocals by Christina Aguilera
2002–2003	Pure Mood by Spyro Gyra; No Woman, No Cry; Could You Be Loved by Bob Marley and The Wailers	Anna and the King by George Fenton; Kodo Drums; Variations by Raúl Di Blasio	Whenever, Wherever by Shakira
2001–2002	Nostalgia by Yanni performed by Royal Philharmonic Orchestra	Anna and the King by George Fenton; Kodo Drums	Starlight by Trace
2000–2001	Reflection (from Mulan) by Vanessa-Mae	Miss Saigon by Alain Boublil, Claude-Michel Schönberg	I Will Always Love You by Whitney Houston
1999–2000	Lord Of The Dance by Ronan Hardiman	Miss Saigon by Alain Boublil, Claude-Michel Schönberg	I Will Always Love You by Whitney Houston

== Competitive highlights ==
GP = Grand Prix; JGP = Junior Grand Prix

International
Event	96–97	97–98	98–99	99–00	00–01	01–02	02–03	03–04	04–05	05–06	06–07	07–08	08–09	09–10	10–11
Olympics						13th				8th				15th	
Worlds					12th		19th	13th	14th	6th	7th	6th	9th	26th	
Europeans				16th	5th	13th	WD	10th	10th	4th	2nd	2nd		5th	1st
GP Final											3rd				
GP China													6th		
GP France							5th					4th			
GP NHK Trophy							7th			7th		2nd		WD	
GP Russia											1st				
GP Skate America											4th				
GP Skate Canada						5th				5th					WD
Finlandia						9th							3rd		
Nebelhorn					2nd					5th					
Nepela							2nd								
Universiade									5th						
International: Junior
Junior Worlds			10th	3rd											
JGP Final					4th										
JGP Canada				6th											
JGP Czech					1st										
JGP France					3rd										
JGP Hungary			4th												
JGP Norway				5th											
JGP Slovakia		10th													
JGP Ukraine			11th												
EYOF			2nd												
Gardena		7th J													
Heiko Fischer	3rd														
National
Swiss Champ.	1st N	1st J	2nd	1st	1st		1st		1st	1st	1st	1st		1st	
Team events
Japan Open										3rd T 3rd P	2nd T 2nd P	2nd T 2nd P			3rd T 4th P
Levels: N = Novice; J = Junior. WD = Withdrew; T = Team result; P = Personal result. Medals awarded for team results only.

Pro-am events
Event	2012–13	2014–15
Medal Winners Open	4th	2nd

Awards and achievements
Preceded by Ariella Kaeslin	Swiss Sportswoman of the Year; 2011	Succeeded by Nicola Spirig
