= Tomáš Verner =

Czech figure skater

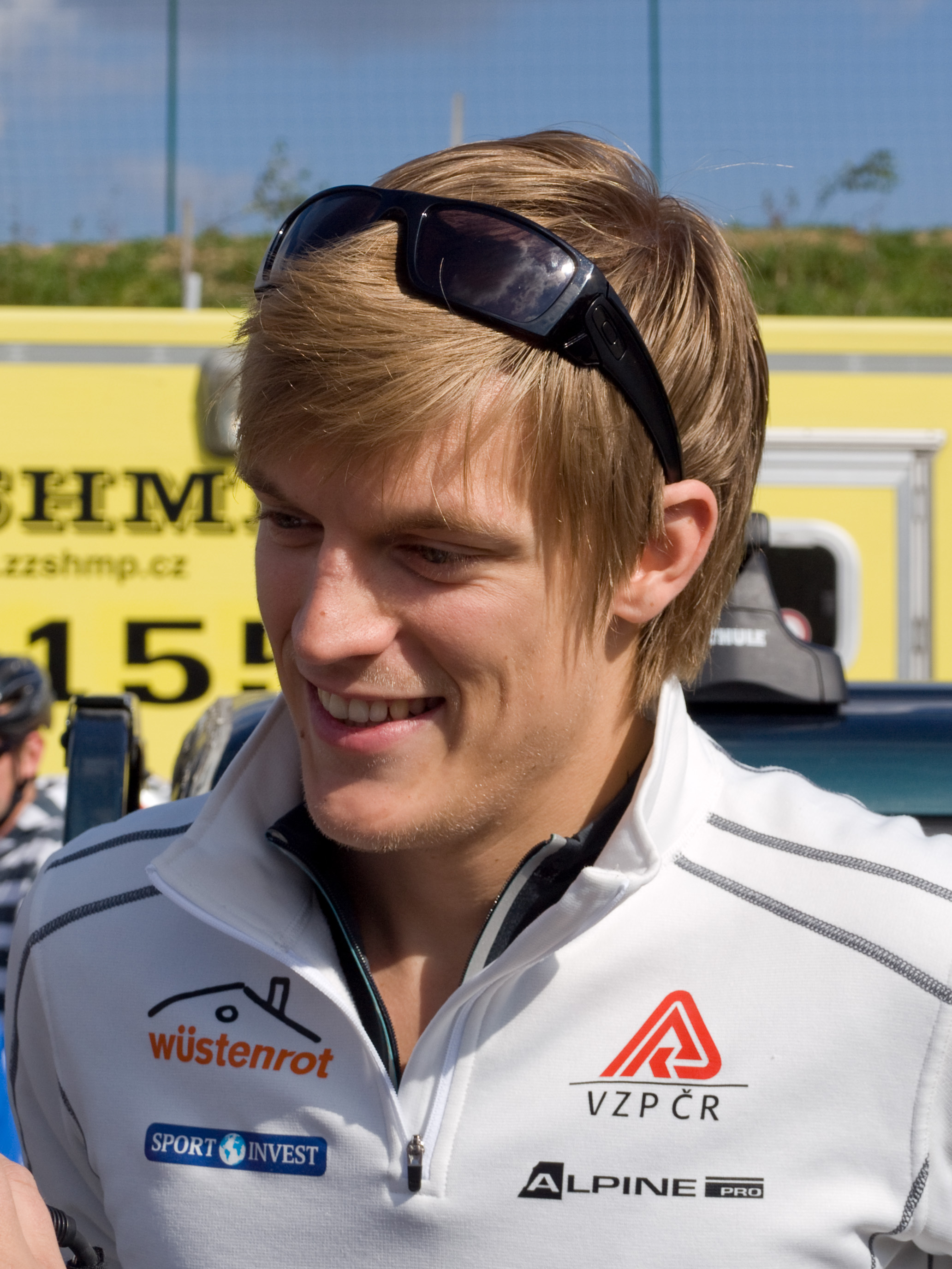
- Verner in 2010

Personal information
- Born: 3 June 1986 (age 40) Písek, Czechoslovakia
- Home town: Borovany
- Height: 1.80 m (5 ft 11 in)

Figure skating career
- Country: Czech Republic
- Began skating: 1991
- Retired: 2014

Medal record
Event	Gold medal – first place	Silver medal – second place	Bronze medal – third place
European Championships	1	1	1
Czech Championships	10	2	0
Medal list
European Championships
Gold medal – first place	2008 Zagreb	Singles
Silver medal – second place	2007 Warsaw	Singles
Bronze medal – third place	2011 Bern	Singles
Czech Championships
Gold medal – first place	2002 Karviná	Singles
Gold medal – first place	2003 Brno	Singles
Gold medal – first place	2004 Hradec Králové	Singles
Gold medal – first place	2006 České Budějovice	Singles
Gold medal – first place	2007 Liberec	Singles
Gold medal – first place	2008 Trenčín	Singles
Gold medal – first place	2011 Žilina	Singles
Gold medal – first place	2012 Ostrava	Singles
Gold medal – first place	2013 Cieszyn	Singles
Gold medal – first place	2014 Bratislava	Singles
Silver medal – second place	2001 Mladá Boleslav	Singles
Silver medal – second place	2010 Cieszyn	Singles

Tomáš Verner (Czech pronunciation: [ˈtomaːʃ ˈvɛrnɛr]; born 3 June 1986) is a former Czech figure skater. He is the 2008 European champion, a medalist at two other European Championships (2007 silver, 2011 bronze), and a ten-time (2002–2004, 2006–2008, 2011–2014) Czech national champion. He has won six senior Grand Prix medals, including the 2010 Cup of Russia title.

== Personal life ==
Tomáš Verner was born on 3 June 1986 in Písek, Czech Republic. He moved to the capital, Prague, when he was 12 years old. His father is a doctor. He has an older brother, Miroslav, who formerly competed internationally in junior pair skating, and a younger sister, Kateřina, who is a gymnast. He was in relationship for four years with figure skater Nathalie Péchalat. In March 2020, he married Thai figure skater Tammy Sutan. They are expecting their son in September 2020.

Verner studied physical education and sports at Charles University in Prague, and earned his Bachelor of Arts degree in 2010. He then studied sports marketing and management at the University of Prague. He speaks Czech, German, and English and also knows some Russian.

== Career ==
=== Early career ===
Verner started skating at the age of five. He also did athletics and played football before choosing to focus on skating. At the age of 12, he moved from Písek, where he was born, to Prague where his talent was spotted by coach Vlasta Kopřivová.

He won his first national title in the 2001–02 season, and later that year represented the Czech Republic at the European Championships, where he finished 14th, and at the World Championships, where he failed to qualify for the free skate. Over the next four years, Verner finished as high as 10th place at Europeans and 13th at Worlds. He missed much of the 2004–05 season after he twisted his ankle and tore part of the muscle from the bone. He trained in Prague and also traveled regularly to Oberstdorf, Germany to train with Michael Huth. During summers, he would also spend a few weeks training in Leppävirta, Finland.

=== 2006–2007 season ===
In 2007, Verner improved significantly upon his previous results. At the European Championships in Warsaw, he led after the short program before finishing with the silver medal behind Brian Joubert. He was the first Czech male single skater to medal at the European Championships since 1992. At the 2007 World Championships in Japan, he finished fourth overall. Having popped a triple axel and made an error on a spin, he was in ninth place after the short but moved up to fourth after the long program, landing a quadruple toe loop-triple toe loop combination and a further quadruple toe loop.

=== 2007–2009 seasons ===
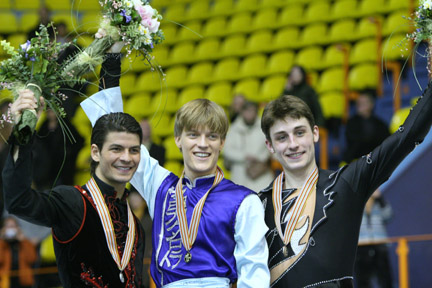
Verner (center) with fellow medalists Stéphane Lambiel and Brian Joubert at the 2008 European Championships

In 2008, Verner became the first Czech male to win Europeans since Petr Barna's victory for Czechoslovakia in 1992. He was fourth after the short program at the 2008 World Championships but finished 15th after popping several jumps in his long program.

Verner's 2008–09 Grand Prix assignments were the Cup of China and the Cup of Russia. He finished third and second, respectively, qualifying for the Grand Prix Final where he finished 4th. At the 2009 Europeans, Verner scored a personal best in the short program and was in second place, but made several mistakes in his long program which dropped him to 6th place overall. He finished fourth at the 2009 World Championships.

=== 2009–2010 season ===
Verner began the 2009–10 season with a silver medal at the 2009 Trophée Eric Bompard. He finished fifth at the 2010 Skate America. While at Skate America, he became ill with H1N1 flu, from which he was unable to fully recover during the rest of the season. Verner was first alternate for the Grand Prix Final, and eventually filled the slot left open by the injured Brian Joubert; he came in sixth. He was second to Michal Březina at the Czech Championships, dropped to 10th at Europeans and struggled at the Olympics, finishing 19th. Verner decided not to compete at the World Championships because he felt unprepared for the event.

=== 2010–2011 season ===
Before the start of the 2010–11 season, Verner changed coaches, and began training with Robert Emerson in Richmond Hill, near Toronto. Whereas in Europe, he typically trained his program in parts, with full run-throughs only before a competition, his new coach requires complete run-throughs in everyday training. Verner won the bronze at 2010 Cup of China, his first Grand Prix event of the year. At the 2010 Cup of Russia, Verner set a new personal best in the long program and beat Patrick Chan and Jeremy Abbott to win his first senior Grand Prix title. He was the only person to beat Patrick Chan in international competition during the 2010–2011 season. He qualified for the 2010–2011 Grand Prix Final, where he finished fifth in the short program and fourth in the free skate for fifth place overall. His next event was the Czech national championships, which he won for the first time in three years. Verner was fifth in the short program at the 2011 Europeans following a fall on his triple Axel, but finished second in the free skate to move up to third overall. The bronze medal was his first podium finish at the Europeans since winning the event in 2008.

Following the European Championships, Verner and a number of other elite skaters performed in a show in North Korea, an event which was sanctioned by the Czech skating association and the ISU but resulted in some criticism in the Czech Republic.

Verner finished 12th at the 2011 World Championships.

=== 2011–2014 ===
Verner withdrew from the 2011 Nebelhorn Trophy due to a back injury. He was not fully recovered by the Grand Prix series. He finished 5th at the 2011 NHK Trophy and withdrew from his second assignment, the 2011 Rostelecom Cup. At the Czech Championships, Verner was second behind Michal Březina after the short program but won the free skate and took his eighth national title. He finished 5th at the 2012 European Championships and 16th at the 2012 World Championships.

Verner was 11th at the 2013 European Championships and 21st at the World Championships. In June and July 2013, he trained at the IceDome camp in Oberstdorf, working with Vlasta Kopřivová, Michael Huth, and Rostislav Sinicyn. He received no Grand Prix assignments for the 2013–2014 season.

In August 2013, Verner announced that he would return to Oberstdorf full-time to work with Michael Huth as his coach. In October, he won gold at the 2013 Ondrej Nepela Memorial after placing second in the short program and first in the free skate. Verner went on to compete at the Cup of Nice, which he also won.

In December, Verner competed at the Czech Championships where he won his tenth title, twenty-eight points ahead of second-place finisher, Michal Březina, securing himself a spot at his third Olympics. He finished 11th at the 2014 Winter Olympics in Sochi. Although he initially intended to retire in February 2014, Verner decided to compete at the 2014 World Championships in Saitama, Japan, and finished tenth at the event. He then retired from competition.

== Programs ==
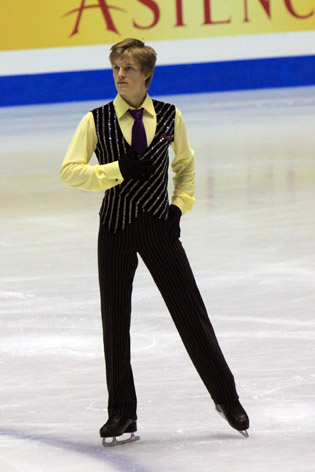
Verner at the 2009 Grand Prix Final

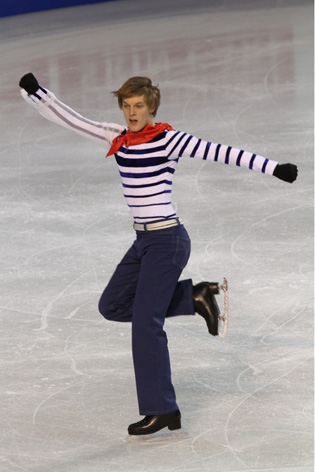
Verner at 2010 Europeans

Season	Short program	Free skating	Exhibition
2013–2014	Dueling Banjos (from Deliverance) by Arthur Smith	Tango medley: Oblivion; Adiós Nonino; Libertango by Astor Piazzolla; La cumparsita by Gerardo Matos Rodríguez	
2012–2013	Dracula	"It Don't Mean a Thing" by Duke Ellington, Louis Armstrong; "La Vie en rose" performed by Louis Armstrong; Sing, Sing, Sing	
2011–2012	Carmina Burana (hiphop version) by Carl Orff	Sing, Sing, Sing (from Swing Kids); "La Vie en rose" performed by Louis Armstrong	Sexy And I Know It by LMFAO
2010–2011	Singin' in the Rain	Michael Jackson medley	Always Look on the Bright Side of Life by Monty Python
2009–2010	Zorba the Greek soundtrack by Mikis Theodorakis	The Godfather soundtrack by Nino Rota, Carmine Coppola	Always Look on the Bright Side of Life by Monty Python; Michael Jackson medley
2008–2009	Melodie en Crépuscule; Gypsy Swing by Django Reinhardt	Tango medley: Oblivion; Adiós Nonino; Libertango by Astor Piazzolla; La cumparsita by Gerardo Matos Rodríguez	Michael Jackson medley
2007–2008	Melodie en Crépuscule; Gypsy Swing by Django Reinhardt	Crouching Tiger, Hidden Dragon by Tan Dun	Volare by the Gipsy Kings
2006–2007	Toccata & Fugue by Johann Sebastian Bach performed by Vanessa-Mae	Fundamentum, Lesium by Lesiëm	The Pink Panther
2005–2006	Blues	Fundamentum, Lesium by Lesiëm	Rockaria!
2004–2005	Blues	Lorelei, Noche de Mi Amor by Raúl Di Blasio; PS1491 by John Tesh	Rockaria!
2003–2004	New classical melody performed by Boston Symphony Orchestra	Lorelei, Noche de Mi Amor by Raúl Di Blasio; PS1491 by John Tesh	Rockaria!
2002–2003	New classical melody performed by Boston Symphony Orchestra	One Man's Dream (from Live at the Acropolis); Victory by Yanni	Rockaria!
2001–2002	Victory by Bond	One Man's Dream (from Live at the Acropolis)	
2000–2001	Song and Dance by Andrew Lloyd Webber	The Terminator	

== Competitive highlights ==
International
Event	99–00	00–01	01–02	02–03	03–04	04–05	05–06	06–07	07–08	08–09	09–10	10–11	11–12	12–13	13–14	14–15
Olympics							18th				19th				11th	
Worlds			26th	22nd	19th	16th QR	13th	4th	15th	4th		12th	16th	21st	10th	
Europeans			14th	WD	10th		10th	2nd	1st	6th	10th	3rd	5th	11th	7th	
Grand Prix Final										4th	6th	5th				
GP Bompard									6th		2nd			8th		
GP Cup of China										3rd		3rd				
GP Cup of Russia								4th		2nd		1st	WD			
GP NHK Trophy									2nd				5th			
GP Skate America											5th			8th		
GP Skate Canada								5th								
Bofrost Cup					6th											
Cup of Nice															1st	
Finlandia						6th			1st							
Ice Challenge											1st					
Karl Schäfer			9th	11th			1st	2nd		3rd						
Nebelhorn			15th	11th			3rd	1st	3rd	4th				6th		
Ondrej Nepela							3rd							3rd	1st	
International: Junior
Junior Worlds		17th			14th											
JGP Final				7th	6th											
JGP Bulgaria					2nd											
JGP Croatia	14th															
JGP Czech Rep.	17th	15th	10th		1st											
JGP Germany				2nd												
JGP Italy				5th												
JGP Netherlands			4th													
JGP Poland		11th														
Paekdusan Prize		4th														
National
Czech Champ.	2nd J.	2nd	1st	1st	1st		1st	1st	1st		2nd	1st	1st	1st	1st	
Team events
Japan Open																1st T (4th P)
