= Fedor Sokolov =

Figure skater

Fedor
Personal information
- Native name: פיודור סוקולוב
- Full name: Fedor Borisovich Sokolov
- Born: 14 December 1984 (age 41) novosibirsk
- Height: 1.81 m (5 ft 11 in)

Figure skating career
- Country: Israel
- Partner: Ekaterina Sokolova
- Coach: Nikolai Velikov

Fedor Borisovich Sokolov (Hebrew: פיודור סוקולוב, Russian: Фёдор Борисович Соколов; born 14 December 1984) is a former pair skater. He competed internationally for Israel with pairs partner and wife Ekaterina Sokolova. They are two-time Israeli national champions.

== Personal life ==
Fedor Sokolov was born in Moscow, Russian SFSR, Soviet Union and was raised in Russia. Sokolova and Sokolov were married in March 2008 in Moscow.

== Career ==
Sokolov and Sokolova began skating together in 2003. They originally represented Russia. They decided to represent Azerbaijan internationally in the 2006–2007 season but withdrew from the 2007 European Championships due to a problem with paperwork regarding their country change. They never successfully represented Azerbaijan in ISU competition.

They decided to compete for Israel in 2007. They won the 2008 Israeli national pairs title and placed 12th at the 2008 European Championships. The pair made their Grand Prix debut at the 2008 Cup of Russia, where they placed 8th. At the 2008–2009 Israeli Championships, they won the Israeli national title for the second time.

They withdrew from the 2009 European Championships mid-competition due to injury.

== Programs ==
Season	Short Program	Free Skating
2008–2009	The Nutcracker by Pyotr Ilyich Tchaikovsky	Snow Storm (soundtrack) by Georgy Sviridov
2007–2008		
2006–2007	Flamenco by Didulia	Spider-Man soundtrack by Danny Elfman

== Competitive highlights ==
(with Sokolova for Israel)

Competition	2007–2008	2008–2009
World Championships		21st
European Championships	12th	WD
Israeli Championships	1st	1st
Cup of Russia		8th
Coupe de Nice		5th

- WD = Withdrawn

(with Sokolova for Azerbaijan)

Competition	2006–2007
European Championships	WD

- WD = Withdrawn
