= Przemysław Domański =

Polish figure skater

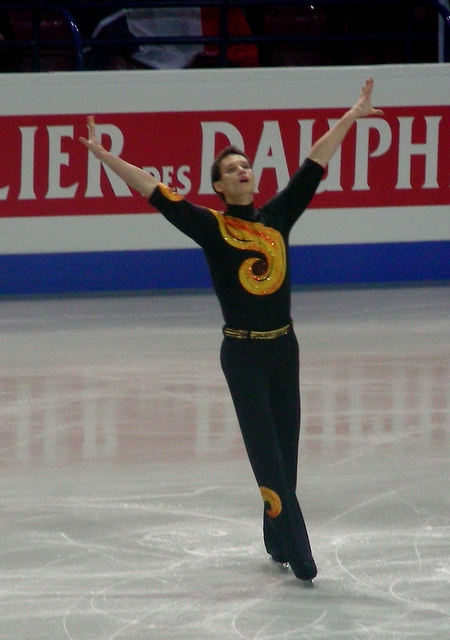
- Domański at the 2007 European Championships

Personal information
- Born: 27 June 1986 (age 40) Warsaw, Polish People's Republic
- Home town: Katowice
- Height: 1.82 m (5 ft 11 1/2 in)

Figure skating career
- Country: Poland
- Skating club: UKL Spin Katowice

Przemysław Domański (Polish pronunciation: [pʂɛˈmɨswav dɔˈmaɲski]; born 27 June 1986, in Warsaw) is a Polish former competitive figure skater. He is a four-time Polish national champion and competed at the 2010 Winter Olympics.

He began skating at the age of five; the bones in his feet were growing in the wrong direction and his doctor advised he should do a sport using inflexible boots or wear orthopedic boots until he was 18.

== Programs ==
Season	Short program	Free skating
2009–10	Tango de los Exilados by Walter Taieb, Vanessa-Mae	Paso Doble
2008–09	Once Upon a Time in Mexico by Robert Rodriguez	Gypsy music
2007–08	Alexander by Vangelis	Jazz mix
2006–07	Alexander by Vangelis	Music by Safri Duo
2005–06	Music by Safri Duo	Music by Safri Duo
2004–05	Toccata and Fugue in D-Minor (modern version) by Johann Sebastian Bach	Final Fantasy
2003–04	Blues Brothers (soundtrack)	The Godfather by Nino Rota
2002–03	Bandyta by Michał Lorenc	Music by Aram Khachaturian

== Competitive highlights ==
JGP: Junior Grand Prix

Event	01–02	02–03	03–04	04–05	05–06	06–07	07–08	08–09	09–10	10–11
Winter Olympics									28th	
World Championships						33rd		23rd		
European Championships			33rd		28th	20th		17th		
Polish Championships	2nd J	2nd J	1st J	2nd	1st	1st	2nd	1st		1st
Crystal Skate of Romania								1st		
Cup of Nice						2nd	5th			
Finlandia Trophy			10th						14th	
Golden Spin of Zagreb					14th		18th			
Nebelhorn Trophy					17th	11th	10th	14th		
Nepela Memorial									9th	
NRW Trophy										WD
Karl Schäfer Memorial				15th		10th				
Winter Universiade								18th		
World Junior Championships		23rd	16th	14th						
JGP France				13th						
JGP Germany		15th		12th						
JGP Italy		18th								
JGP Poland	16th		16th							
JGP Slovakia			12th							
European Youth Olympic Festival		10th								
Grand Prize SNP		2nd J								
