= Matthieu Jost (figure skater) =

French ice dancer

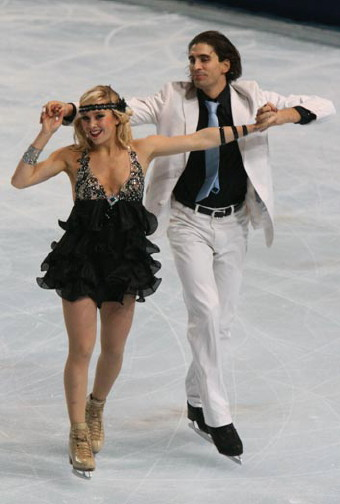
- Carron/Jost at the 2008 Trophée Eric Bompard

Personal information
- Born: 8 January 1981 (age 45) Sainte-Foy-lès-Lyon, Rhône
- Home town: Saint-Alban-de-Roche
- Height: 1.84 m (6 ft 0 in)

Figure skating career
- Country: France
- Skating club: CPG Epinal
- Began skating: 1989
- Retired: 2009

Matthieu Jost (born 8 January 1981) is a French former competitive ice dancer. With Pernelle Carron, he is the 2007 Skate Canada International bronze medallist, 2007 Winter Universiade bronze medallist, and 2008 Karl Schäfer Memorial champion. They placed sixth at the 2009 European Championships and ninth at the 2009 World Championships.

== Career ==
Jost began competing internationally with Roxane Petetin in the mid-1990s. They competed for three seasons on the ISU Junior Grand Prix series and placed 11th at the 2000 World Junior Championships. Petetin/Jost moved up to the senior level in the 2000–01 season. They last competed together at the 2004 European Championships, where they finished 12th. Petetin retired due to injury.

Jost teamed up with Pernelle Carron in the summer of 2005. They won a bronze medal at one Grand Prix event, the 2007 Skate Canada International, as well as bronze at the Winter Universiade and gold at the Karl Schäfer Memorial. Carron/Jost competed at three European Championships, finishing as high as sixth (2009), and placed ninth in their only appearance at the World Championships, also in 2009. Nationally, they were bronze medallists in 2006 and 2007 and silver medallists in 2008 and 2009. Carron ended their partnership in April 2009.

Jost teamed up with Olga Orlova later that year but their partnership was short-lived.

== Personal life ==
Jost is a computer analyst. His daughter with singles skater Vanessa Gusmeroli was born in the summer of 2009.

== Programs ==
=== With Carron ===
Season	Original dance	Free dance	Exhibition
2008–2009	Basin Street Blues by Louis Armstrong	Venez Milord; La Foule; Venez Milord by Édith Piaf; Butterflies and Hurricanes by Muse	
2007–2008	Degeneration performed by Mes Aïeux	Nocturne by Frédéric Chopin	Massive Attack
2006–2007	Maria de Buenos Aires by Astor Piazzolla: Yo Soy Maria; Aria de los Analista; Milonga de la Anuciacion	Venez Milord; La Foule; Venez Milord by Édith Piaf	

=== With Petetin ===
Season	Original dance	Free dance
2004–2005	Non, Non by Dany Brillant; Je Ne Veux Pas Travailler by Pink Martini; Non, Non by Dany Brillant	Selection by René Aubry; Goodbye Lenin! by Yann Tiersen; Casse Roulement Hugues Le Bars
2003–2004	Blues; Boogie Woogie	Xotica (Holiday on Ice Europe) by René Dupéré
2002–2003	March; Waltz	Concerto for Violin by Philip Glass
2001–2002	Tango; Flamenco by Tauber	Four Seasons (modern version) by Antonio Vivaldi; Air by Johann Sebastian Bach

== Competitive highlights ==
GP: Grand Prix; JGP: Junior Grand Prix

=== With Orlova ===
National
Event	2009–10
French Championships	3rd

=== With Carron ===
International
Event	2005–06	2006–07	2007–08	2008–09
World Champ.				9th
European Champ.		9th	9th	6th
GP Bompard	11th	8th	5th	5th
GP Cup of China		5th		
GP Skate America				5th
GP Skate Canada			3rd	
Schäfer Memorial	7th			1st
Winter Universiade		3rd		
National
French Champ.	3rd	3rd	2nd	2nd

=== With Petetin ===
International
Event	96–97	97–98	98–99	99–00	00–01	01–02	02–03	03–04
Worlds							23rd	
Europeans						19th	17th	12th
GP Bofrost Cup							8th	
GP Cup of Russia								8th
GP Lalique							6th	6th
Finlandia Trophy					6th			
Schäfer Memorial						7th		
International: Junior
Junior Worlds			16th	11th				
JGP Czech Rep.				7th				
JGP France		10th						
JGP Germany			5th					
JGP Japan				4th				
JGP Mexico			6th					
JGP Slovakia		4th						
PFSA Trophy	7th J							
National
French Champ.			2nd J	2nd J	7th	2nd	2nd	2nd
J = Junior level
