= Maria-Elena Papasotiriou =

American figure skater

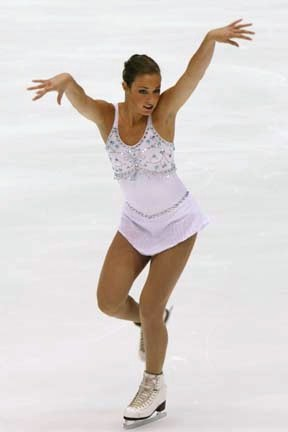

Personal information
- Born: 27 January 1990 (age 36) Park Ridge, Illinois, United States

Figure skating career
- Country: Greece
- Coach: Alexander Ouriashev
- Skating club: Flying Ice Skaters
- Retired: 2010

Maria-Elena Papasotiriou (born 27 January 1990) is an American former competitive figure skater who represented Greece. She was born in Park Ridge, Illinois. She was placed 31st at the 2007 European Championships.

== Competitive highlights ==
Event	2006–2007	2007–2008	2008–2009	2009–2010
World Championships	38th	50th	47th	
European Championships	31st	39th	39th	41st
Greek Championships		1st	1st	2nd
Golden Spin of Zagreb			18th	
Karl Schäfer Memorial			17th	
Ondrej Nepela Memorial				14th
Junior Grand Prix, Great Britain		29th		
Junior Grand Prix, USA		WD		
WD = Withdrew
