= Katherine Copely =

American and Lithuanian figure skater (born 1988)

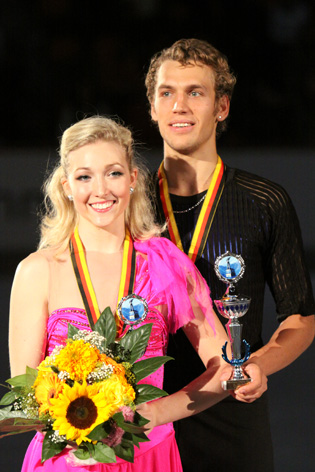
- Copely and Stagniunas in 2009

Personal information
- Full name: Katherine Leigh Copely
- Born: January 9, 1988 (age 38) Cincinnati, Ohio, U.S.
- Height: 5 ft 4 in (1.63 m)

Figure skating career
- Retired: 2010

Katherine Leigh Copely (born January 9, 1988) is an American-born former ice dancer who competed internationally for Lithuania. With partner Deividas Stagniūnas, she is the 4 time Lithuanian National Champion with Bronze Medals at both Golden Spin of Zagreb and Nebelhorn Trophy. Together they qualified for the 2010 Winter Olympics in Vancouver, Canada after placing in the top 20 at the 2009 World Figure Skating Championships in Los Angeles, California. She received her medical degree in 2018 from Central Michigan University College of Medicine.

Copely partnered with Duke Wensel in 2002. They competed until 2004 on the Novice and Junior levels. From 2004 to 2006, Copely skated at the Junior level with Patrick Connelly. She teamed up with Stagniunas in 2006 to compete for Lithuania. By the end of their partnership they were #10 in Europe and #14 in the World. Though they qualified, the team was subsequently prevented from competing at the 2010 Winter Olympics as Katherine was denied Lithuanian citizenship by then president Dalia Grybauskaitė.

Her brother is American ice dancer/coach/choreographer Dean Copely. Her mother is skating costume designer Sandra Copely. Katherine is fellowship trained in Diagnostic Radiology, with a sub-specialty in Musculoskeletal Imaging and is currently an Assistant Professor of Radiology at a state university.

== Programs ==
(with Stagniunas)

Season	Original dance	Free dance
2009–2010	Lithuanian Polka	West Side Story by Leonard Bernstein
2008–09	Bei Mir Bist du Schön (from Swing Kids)	Evita by Andrew Lloyd Webber
2007–08	Two Guitars by Paul Mauriat	Beethoven's Last Night by Trans-Siberian Orchestra
2006–07	Tango by Jaime Wilensky	Kalinka

== Results ==
=== With Duke Wensel ===
Event	2003	2004
U.S. Championships	7th N.	12th J.
N. = Novice level; J. = Junior level

=== With Patrick Connelly ===
Event	2005
U.S. Championships	8th J.
J. = Junior level

=== With Deividas Stagniūnas for Lithuania ===
Results
International
Event	2006–07	2007–08	2008–09	2009–10
Worlds	23rd	14th	14th	
Europeans	18th	12th	10th	
GP Cup of Russia		5th	6th	8th
GP Skate America			8th	
Golden Spin	3rd	3rd		
Nebelhorn	6th			3rd
National
Lithuanian Champ.	1st	1st	1st	1st
GP = Grand Prix
