= Yahor Maistrov =

Belarusian ice dancer

Personal information
- Other names: Egor Maistrov
- Born: 14 February 1988 (age 38) Minsk, Byelorussian SSR, Soviet Union
- Height: 1.60 m (5 ft 3 in)

Figure skating career
- Country: Belarus
- Partner: Ksenia Shmirina
- Coach: Irina Lobacheva, I. A. Tagaeva
- Skating club: Raybicki SZOP

Yahor Maistrov (also: Egor Maistrov, born 14 February 1988) is a Belarusian former competitive ice dancer. He married Ksenia Shmirina in 2007 and began skating with her that year. He previously competed with Alexandra Maksimova, with whom he teamed up in 2005 and was the 2006 Belarusian national silver medalists.

== Competitive highlights ==
(with Shmirina)

Event	2007-2008	2008-2009
World Championships	28th	30th
European Championships	22nd	23rd
Belarusian Championships	1st	1st

(with Maksimova)

Event	2004-2005	2005-2006	2006-2007
World Junior Championships			26th
Belarusian Championships	3rd	2nd	2nd
Junior Grand Prix, Romania			14th
Junior Grand Prix, France			14th
