= Towler =

Towler may refer to:

- Bernard Towler (1912–1992), English footballer
- Candice Towler-Green, English ice dancer
- Dan Towler, American NFL player
- Diane Towler, English ice dancer
- Edwin Towler, English footballer
- Harley Towler, English badminton player
- John C. Towler (1939–2015), American lawyer and politician
- Keith Towler, British social worker
- Michael D. Towler, British physicist
- Phillipa Towler-Green, English ice dancer
- Raymond Towler, American musician
