= 2007 Nebelhorn Trophy =

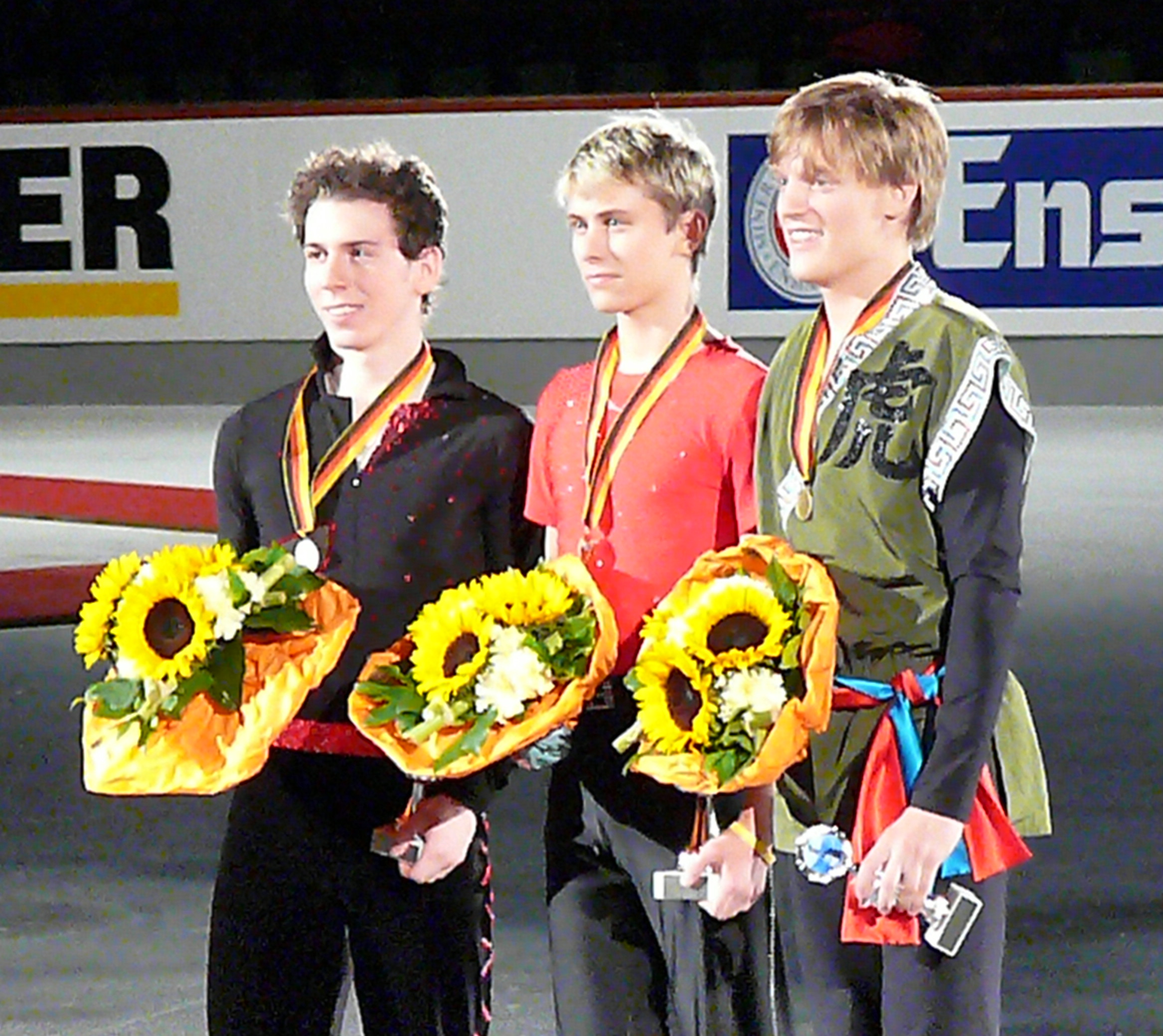
- The men's podium
- Type: Senior International
- Date: September 27 – 30
- Season: 2007–08
- Location: Oberstdorf
- Venue: Eislaufzentrum Oberstdorf

Champions
- Men's singles: (Czech Republic) Michal Březina
- Ladies' singles: (Italy) Carolina Kostner
- Pairs: (Germany) Aliona Savchenko / Robin Szolkowy
- Ice dance: (United States) Jennifer Wester / Daniil Barantsev
- Previous: 2006 Nebelhorn Trophy
- Next: 2008 Nebelhorn Trophy

The 2007 Nebelhorn Trophy took place between September 27 and 30, 2007 at the Eislaufzentrum Oberstdorf. The competition is an international senior-level figure skating competition organized by the Deutsche Eislauf-Union and held annually in Oberstdorf, Germany. It is named after the Nebelhorn, a nearby mountain.

It is one of the first international senior competition of the season. Skaters are entered by their respective national federations and compete in four disciplines: men's singles, ladies' singles, pair skating, and ice dance. The Fritz-Geiger-Memorial Trophy is presented to the team with the highest placements across all disciplines. In 2007, the US won, Germany was second, and Czech Republic was third.

The Nebelhorn Trophy is often used as a testing ground for new changes in skating regulation. In 2007, a compulsory dance test occurred. Three compulsories were performed and each team was drawn to perform a specific dance. The dances were the Austrian Waltz, Yankee Polka, and the Argentine Tango.

== Results ==
=== Men ===
Rank	Name	Nation	Total points	SP		FS	
1	Michal Březina	Czech Republic	185.55	3	61.30	1	124.2
2	Shaun Rogers	United States	185.02	2	61.55	2	123.47
3	Tomáš Verner	Czech Republic	178.50	1	73.11	9	105.39
4	Igor Macypura	Slovakia	177.13	4	59.88	3	117.25
5	Derrick Delmore	United States	166.31	9	51.78	4	114.53
6	Vaughn Chipeur	Canada	163.27	7	53.59	5	109.68
7	Alexander Uspenski	Russia	162.66	5	56.07	7	106.59
8	Mikhail Magerovski	Russia	157.05	10	49.23	6	107.82
9	Jamal Othman	Switzerland	151.88	15	46.16	8	105.72
10	Przemysław Domański	Poland	151.69	6	54.45	11	97.24
11	Joey Russell	Canada	148.35	16	46.08	10	102.27
12	Vitali Sazonets	Ukraine	143.54	11	48.76	12	94.78
13	Damjan Ostojič	Bosnia and Herzegovina	139.04	13	47.60	14	91.44
14	Zoltán Kelemen	Romania	137.18	12	48.40	15	88.78
15	Peter Liebers	Germany	133.61	8	52.09	17	81.52
16	Ari-Pekka Nurmenkari	Finland	133.01	18	40.81	13	92.20
17	Martin Liebers	Germany	129.12	17	43.10	16	86.02
18	Taras Rajec	Slovakia	128.04	14	47.51	19	80.53
19	Luis Hernández	Mexico	114.07	21	32.84	18	81.23
20	Norman Keck	Germany	110.90	19	38.26	20	72.64
21	Dean Timmins	Australia	101.09	20	34.02	21	67.07
WD	Alexandr Kazakov	Belarus					

=== Ladies ===
Rank	Name	Nation	Total points	SP		FS	
1	Carolina Kostner	Italy	173.53	1	60.15	1	113.38
2	Megan Williams Stewart	United States	141.60	4	48.97	2	92.63
3	Laura Lepistö	Finland	141.07	3	50.41	3	90.66
4	Annette Dytrt	Germany	134.78	2	51.84	6	82.94
5	Júlia Sebestyén	Hungary	133.81	10	43.92	4	89.89
6	Jelena Glebova	Estonia	127.03	13	40.59	5	86.44
7	Anna Jurkiewicz	Poland	126.83	8	44.95	7	81.88
8	Kristin Wieczorek	Germany	124.28	6	45.82	13	78.46
9	Arina Martinova	Russia	123.58	9	44.64	10	78.94
10	Constanze Paulinus	Germany	122.70	11	43.36	9	79.34
11	Tuğba Karademir	Turkey	121.51	7	45.35	14	76.16
12	Ivana Reitmayerová	Slovakia	120.16	12	41.54	12	78.62
13	Danielle Kahle	United States	117.42	15	37.72	8	79.70
14	Nella Simaová	Czech Republic	116.15	16	37.37	11	78.78
15	Alisa Drei	Finland	115.46	5	46.09	16	69.37
16	Karen Venhuizen	Netherlands	109.61	14	38.04	15	71.57
17	Cindy Carquillat	Switzerland	103.52	17	36.42	17	67.10
18	Ana Cecilia Cantu	Mexico	99.35	18	36.36	18	62.99
19	Katharina Häcker	Germany	98.14	19	35.81	19	62.33
20	Andrea Kreuzer	Austria	92.67	20	35.07	22	57.60
21	Isabelle Pieman	Belgium	90.25	22	31.34	21	58.91
22	Ekaterina Proyda	Ukraine	89.86	21	34.02	23	55.84
23	Stasia Rage	Latvia	84.42	23	24.31	20	60.11
WD	Myriam Leuenberger	Switzerland					

=== Pairs ===
Rank	Name	Nation	Total points	SP		FS	
1	Aliona Savchenko / Robin Szolkowy	Germany	175.15	1	69.33	1	105.82
2	Meagan Duhamel / Craig Buntin	Canada	147.86	2	56.66	3	91.20
3	Amanda Evora / Mark Ladwig	United States	146.89	4	47.18	2	99.71
4	Rachel Kirkland / Eric Radford	Canada	137.07	3	49.15	4	87.92
5	Tiffany Vise / Derek Trent	United States	121.02	5	44.68	6	76.34
6	Stacey Kemp / David King	United Kingdom	118.51	6	41.39	5	77.12
WD	Laura Magitteri / Ondřej Hotárek	Italy		7	40.26		
WD	Dominika Piątkowska / Dmitri Khromin	Poland					

=== Ice dance ===
Rank	Name	Nation	Total points	CD		OD		FD	
1	Jennifer Wester / Daniil Barantsev	United States	157.03	1	30.33	1	47.46	1	79.24
2	Christina Beier / William Beier	Germany	149.91	4	27.13	2	46.76	2	76.02
3	Alla Beknazarova / Vladimir Zuev	Ukraine	146.16	2	29.86	3	44.48	4	71.82
4	Allie Hann-McCurdy / Michael Coreno	Canada	143.82	3	27.78	5	42.66	3	73.38
5	Carolina Hermann / Daniel Hermann	Germany	137.36	5	26.46	6	42.64	5	68.26
6	Barbora Silná / Dmitri Matsjuk	Austria	137.29	7	26.09	4	43.08	6	68.12
7	Alina Saprikina / Pavel Khimich	Ukraine	132.12	10	22.76	7	42.12	7	67.24
8	Lynn Kriengkrairut / Logan Giulietti-Schmitt	United States	130.33	11	22.40	9	41.15	8	66.78
9	Olga Gmizina / Ivan Lobanov	Russia	129.40	8	25.52	10	40.97	10	62.91
10	Mylène Girard / Liam Dougherty	Canada	127.41	6	26.19	8	41.70	11	59.52
11	Lucie Myslivečková / Matěj Novák	Czech Republic	123.05	12	22.15	12	36.48	9	64.42
12	Phillipa Towler-Green / Phillip Poole	United Kingdom	118.44	9	22.98	13	36.44	12	59.02
13	Tanja Kolbe / Sascha Rabe	Germany	117.41	14	19.71	11	39.47	13	58.23
WD	Nicolette Amie House / Aidas Reklys	Lithuania		13	21.48	14	32.84		
WD	Evgenia Melnik / Oleg Krupen	Belarus							

==== Compulsory dances by team ====
Austrian Waltz	Yankee Polka	Argentine Tango
Christina Beier / William Beier	Olga Gmizina / Ivan Lobanov	Jennifer Wester / Daniil Barantsev
Mylène Girard / Liam Dougherty	Lucie Myslivečková / Matěj Novák	Alla Beknazarova / Vladimir Zuev
Phillipa Towler-Green / Phillip Poole	Nicolette Amie House / Aidas Reklys	Allie Hann-McCurdy / Michael Coreno
Alina Saprikina / Pavel Khimich	Tanja Kolbe / Sascha Rabe	Carolina Hermann / Daniel Hermann
Lynn Kriengkrairut / Logan Giulietti-Schmitt		Barbora Silná / Dmitri Matsjuk
