= 2004 Nebelhorn Trophy =

- Type: Senior International
- Date: September 2 – 5
- Season: 2004–05
- Location: Oberstdorf
- Venue: Eislaufzentrum

Champions
- Men's singles: (Canada) Marc-André Craig
- Ladies' singles: (United States) Louann Donovan
- Pairs: (United States) Marcy Hinzmann / Aaron Parchem
- Ice dance: (United States) Lydia Manon / Ryan O'Mera
- Previous: 2003 Nebelhorn Trophy
- Next: 2005 Nebelhorn Trophy

The 2004 Nebelhorn Trophy took place between September 2 and 5, 2004 at the Eislaufzentrum. The compulsory dance was the Rhumba. It is an international senior-level figure skating competition organized by the Deutsche Eislauf-Union and held annually in Oberstdorf, Germany. The competition is named after the Nebelhorn, a nearby mountain.

It was one of the first international senior competitions of the season. Skaters were entered by their respective national federations, rather than receiving individual invitations as in the Grand Prix of Figure Skating, and competed in four disciplines: men's singles, ladies' singles, pair skating, and ice dance. The Fritz-Geiger-Memorial Trophy was presented to the country with the highest placements across all disciplines.

== Results ==
=== Men ===
Rank	Name	Nation	Total points	SP		FS	
1	Marc-André Craig	Canada	187.37	1	63.46	1	123.91
2	Alexander Kondakov	Russia	167.82	9	52.52	2	115.30
3	Christopher Toland	United States	162.01	5	54.57	3	107.44
4	Andrei Lezin	Russia	160.84	2	60.59	7	100.25
5	Jamal Othman	Switzerland	159.43	4	54.80	4	104.63
6	Derrick Delmore	United States	157.84	3	60.51	8	97.33
7	Braden Overett	United States	156.33	7	53.72	5	102.61
8	Trifun Zivanovic	Serbia and Montenegro	153.86	8	53.04	6	100.82
9	Sergei Davydov	Belarus	148.44	6	53.74	10	94.70
10	Hirokazu Kobayashi	Japan	139.11	10	51.47	12	87.64
11	Maciej Kuś	Poland	138.82	15	42.56	9	96.26
12	Martin Liebers	Germany	137.06	12	47.68	11	89.38
13	Konstantin Menshov	Russia	131.35	11	48.24	13	83.11
14	Ari-Pekka Nurmenkari	Finland	125.08	13	46.81	14	78.27
15	Aidas Reklys	Lithuania	115.96	16	42.12	16	73.84
16	Steffen Hoermann	Germany	115.94	14	45.63	17	70.31
17	Christopher Tees	United Kingdom	111.29	17	35.67	15	75.62
18	Christian Rauchbauer	Austria	98.95	18	35.44	18	63.51
19	Gareth Echardt	South Africa	93.76	20	31.59	19	62.17
20	Tomas Katukevicius	Lithuania	90.98	19	33.20	20	57.78

=== Ladies ===
Rank	Name	Nation	Total points	SP		FS	
1	Louann Donovan	United States	132.20	1	50.95	3	81.25
2	Alisa Drei	Finland	128.29	2	49.65	5	78.64
3	Mira Leung	Canada	126.43	7	40.86	1	85.57
4	Alissa Czisny	United States	124.03	4	44.64	4	79.39
5	Cynthia Phaneuf	Canada	123.44	6	41.58	2	81.86
6	Lesley Hawker	Canada	119.69	3	46.36	7	73.33
7	Constanze Kemmner	Germany	118.62	5	43.95	6	74.67
8	Zuzana Babiaková	Slovakia	109.10	8	40.82	10	68.28
9	Elina Kettunen	Finland	108.47	9	39.89	9	68.58
10	Sarah-Michelle Villaneuva	Germany	105.65	10	38.44	11	67.21
11	Constanze Paulinus	Germany	103.99	15	31.83	8	72.16
12	Jelena Glebova	Estonia	97.53	14	32.18	12	65.35
13	Andrea Kreuzer	Austria	91.39	13	33.48	14	57.91
14	Jenna-Anne Buys	South Africa	85.15	17	26.51	13	58.64
15	Dorothee Derroite	Belgium	83.95	12	33.84	17	50.11
16	Kana Kibesaki	Japan	81.22	16	28.75	16	52.47
17	Kathryn Hedley	United Kingdom	80.86	18	25.35	15	55.51
18	Florence Lux	Luxembourg	66.25	19	22.82	18	43.43
WD	Lina Johansson	Sweden		11	36.05		

=== Pairs ===
Rank	Name	Nation	Total points	SP		FS	
1	Marcy Hinzmann / Aaron Parchem	United States	146.44	1	53.46	1	92.98
2	Pascale Bergeron / Robert Davison	Canada	136.87	2	47.05	3	89.82
3	Aliona Savchenko / Robin Szolkowy	Germany	135.40	5	44.46	2	90.94
4	Terra Findlay / John Mattatall	Canada	131.71	4	45.07	4	86.64
5	Amanda Evora / Mark Ladwig	United States	128.50	3	46.44	5	82.06
6	Milica Brozovic / Vladimir Futas	Slovakia	125.03	6	43.70	6	81.33

=== Ice dance ===
Rank	Name	Nation	Total points	CD		OD		FD	
1	Lydia Manon / Ryan O'Mera	United States	173.56	2	31.88	1	50.77	1	90.91
2	Martine Patinaude / Pascal Denis	Canada	154.57	3	30.45	3	43.62	2	80.50
3	Phillipa Towler-Green / Phillip Poole	United Kingdom	136.67	5	27.14	4	41.34	4	68.19
4	Ekaterina Rubleva / Ivan Shefer	Russia	135.27	4	27.48	5	39.26	3	68.53
5	Candice Towler-Green / James Phillipson	United Kingdom	119.94	6	24.90	6	35.40	5	59.64
6	Ivana Dlhopolcekova / Hynek Bilek	Slovakia	104.99	7	23.56	7	27.47	6	53.96
7	Danika Bourne / Alexander Pavlov	Australia	94.33	8	20.40	8	24.64	7	49.29
WD	Alexandra Kauc / Michał Zych	Poland		1	33.16	2	47.37		
