= 2005 Nebelhorn Trophy =

- Type: Senior International
- Date: September 29 – October 2
- Season: 2005–06
- Location: Oberstdorf
- Venue: Eislaufzentrum Oberstdorf

Champions
- Men's singles: (Germany) Stefan Lindemann
- Ladies' singles: (Russia) Elena Sokolova
- Pairs: (Germany) Aliona Savchenko / Robin Szolkowy
- Ice dance: (United States) Tanith Belbin / Benjamin Agosto
- Previous: 2004 Nebelhorn Trophy
- Next: 2006 Nebelhorn Trophy

The 2005 Nebelhorn Trophy took place between September 29 and October 2, 2005 at the Eislaufzentrum Oberstdorf. The compulsory dance was the Ravensburger Waltz, the same compulsory dance that was used later that season at the 2006 Winter Olympics. It is an international senior-level figure skating competition organized by the Deutsche Eislauf-Union and held annually in Oberstdorf, Germany. The competition is named after the Nebelhorn, a nearby mountain.

It was one of the first international senior competitions of the season. Skaters were entered by their respective national federations, rather than receiving individual invitations as in the Grand Prix of Figure Skating, and competed in four disciplines: men's singles, ladies' singles, pair skating, and ice dance. The Fritz-Geiger-Memorial Trophy was presented to the country with the highest placements across all disciplines, which was Germany.

== Results ==
=== Men ===
Rank	Name	Nation	Total points	SP		FS	
1	Stefan Lindemann	Germany	179.34	1	68.93	5	110.41
2	Noriyuki Kanzaki	Japan	178.85	3	58.94	1	119.91
3	Tomáš Verner	Czech Republic	171.80	5	57.04	2	114.76
4	Vitali Danilchenko	Ukraine	171.55	4	58.36	3	113.19
5	Sergei Davydov	Belarus	167.69	6	56.67	4	111.02
6	Shaun Rogers	United States	167.58	2	65.81	7	101.77
7	Nicholas Young	Canada	159.91	7	56.17	6	103.74
8	Silvio Smalun	Germany	153.31	8	51.73	8	101.58
9	Filip Stiller	Sweden	145.27	12	48.59	10	96.68
10	Martin Liebers	Germany	145.12	10	50.18	11	94.94
11	Andrei Lezin	Russia	144.97	14	45.18	9	99.79
12	Denis Leushin	Russia	140.79	11	48.75	13	92.04
13	Aidas Reklys	Lithuania	139.42	13	47.12	12	92.30
14	Hugh Yik	Canada	135.67	9	50.75	18	84.92
15	Michal Matloch	Czech Republic	133.71	16	44.58	16	89.13
16	Kristoffer Berntsson	Sweden	133.54	17	44.22	15	89.32
17	Przemysław Domański	Poland	133.10	18	43.59	14	89.51
18	Jeremy Abbott	United States	123.92	21	35.41	17	88.51
19	Ari-Pekka Nurmenkari	Finland	122.01	19	39.41	19	82.60
20	Clemens Brummer	Germany	120.98	15	44.74	20	76.24
21	Tobias Bayer	Germany	97.44	20	37.45	22	59.99
22	Gareth Echardt	South Africa	94.10	22	30.87	21	63.23

=== Ladies ===
Rank	Name	Nation	Total points	SP		FS	
1	Elena Sokolova	Russia	158.56	1	58.70	1	99.86
2	Alisa Drei	Finland	151.20	2	52.26	2	98.94
3	Beatrisa Liang	United States	141.70	4	49.33	3	92.37
4	Lesley Hawker	Canada	135.22	5	45.94	4	89.28
5	Sarah Meier	Switzerland	131.53	6	44.74	5	86.79
6	Jenna McCorkell	United Kingdom	129.44	3	51.25	7	78.19
7	Amanda Billings	Canada	120.84	11	39.11	6	81.73
8	Annette Dytrt	Germany	119.36	9	42.22	8	77.14
9	Constanze Paulinus	Germany	117.58	7	44.69	9	72.89
10	Jane Bugaeva	United States	111.96	10	41.66	10	70.30
11	Marietheres Huonker	Germany	102.27	8	42.52	15	59.75
12	Anastasia Gimazetdinova	Uzbekistan	102.26	13	36.12	12	66.14
13	Petra Lukacikova	Czech Republic	101.70	16	33.30	11	68.40
14	Roxana Luca	Romania	101.22	12	38.65	13	62.57
15	Andrea Kreuzer	Austria	95.64	14	35.04	14	60.60
16	Ami Kobayashi	Japan	92.47	15	34.24	16	58.23
17	Jacqueline Belenyesiová	Slovakia	90.60	17	32.63	17	57.97
18	Jenna-Anne Buys	South Africa	83.79	18	29.30	18	54.49
19	Evgenia Melnik	Belarus	73.37	19	27.33	19	46.04

=== Pairs ===
Rank	Name	Nation	Total points	SP		FS	
1	Aliona Savchenko / Robin Szolkowy	Germany	161.98	1	60.33	2	101.65
2	Meagan Duhamel / Ryan Arnold	Canada	148.27	2	46.53	1	101.74
3	Marcy Hinzmann / Aaron Parchem	United States	129.42	8	41.44	3	87.98
4	Elena Efaieva / Alexei Menshikov	Russia	128.55	9	40.81	4	87.74
5	Tiffany Scott / Rusty Fein	United States	123.09	4	44.97	6	78.12
6	Mari-Doris Vartmann / Florian Just	Germany	122.67	3	45.64	10	77.03
7	Rebecca Handke / Daniel Wende	Germany	121.97	5	41.77	5	80.20
8	Julia Beloglazova / Andrei Bekh	Ukraine	119.46	7	41.56	8	77.90
9	Dominika Piątkowska / Dmitry Khromin	Poland	118.77	6	41.70	9	77.07
10	Diana Rennik / Aleksei Saks	Estonia	116.46	12	38.47	7	77.99
11	Chloé Katz / Joseph Lynch	United States	114.96	11	40.17	11	74.79
12	Alina Dikhtiar / Filip Zalevski	Ukraine	112.91	10	40.41	12	72.50
13	Rumiana Spassova / Stanimir Todorov	Bulgaria	104.86	16	34.29	13	70.57
14	Becky Cosford / Christopher Richardson	Canada	103.33	14	36.63	14	66.70
15	Marina Aganina / Artem Knyazev	Uzbekistan	102.83	13	37.69	15	65.14
WD	Anastasya Ignatieva / Vitaly Dubina	Russia		15	35.13		

=== Ice dance ===
Rank	Name	Nation	Total points	CD		OD		FD	
1	Tanith Belbin / Benjamin Agosto	United States	185.93	1	36.57	1	59.04	2	90.32
2	Margarita Drobiazko / Povilas Vanagas	Lithuania	182.19	2	34.77	2	55.32	1	92.10
3	Christina Beier / William Beier	Germany	160.66	3	30.59	3	49.76	3	80.31
4	Loren Galler-Rabinowitz / David Mitchell	United States	155.06	5	28.93	4	46.63	4	79.50
5	Tiffany Stiegler / Sergey Magerovskiy	United States	150.04	6	28.56	5	44.87	5	76.61
6	Mylène Girard / Bradley Yaeger	Canada	144.50	4	29.06	8	41.55	6	73.89
7	Phillipa Towler-Green / Phillip Poole	United Kingdom	138.36	8	26.78	6	42.69	7	68.89
8	Pamela O'Connor / Jonathon O'Dougherty	United Kingdom	132.61	7	27.76	7	42.20	10	62.65
9	Siobhan Karam / Joshua McGrath	Canada	127.40	10	24.93	11	37.99	8	64.48
10	Kamila Hájková / David Vincour	Czech Republic	125.63	12	23.67	10	38.66	9	63.30
11	Laura Munana / Luke Munana	Mexico	125.32	11	24.30	9	39.66	11	61.36
12	Olga Gmyzina / Ivan Lobanov	Russia	119.49	9	25.55	12	34.33	12	59.61
13	Barbora Silná / Dmitri Matsjuk	Austria	101.79	13	21.48	13	32.84	14	47.47
14	Leonie Krail / Oscar Peter	Switzerland	100.97	14	20.70	14	29.16	13	51.11
