= Martinova =

Martinova or Martynova may refer to:

== Geography ==
- Martinová, a village in Slovakia

== People ==
- Arina Martinova, figure skater
- Iana Martynova, swimmer
- Maria Martinova, Bulgarian classical pianist
- Natalia Martinova, skier
- Olga Martynova, writer
