= 2006 Nebelhorn Trophy =

- Type: Senior International
- Date: September 28 – October 1
- Season: 2006–07
- Location: Oberstdorf
- Venue: Eislaufzentrum Oberstdorf

Champions
- Men's singles: (Czech Republic) Tomáš Verner
- Ladies' singles: (United States) Beatrisa Liang
- Pairs: (United States) Brooke Castile / Benjamin Okolski
- Ice dance: (United Kingdom) Sinead Kerr / John Kerr
- Previous: 2005 Nebelhorn Trophy
- Next: 2007 Nebelhorn Trophy

The 2006 Nebelhorn Trophy took place between September 28 and October 1, 2006 at the Eislaufzentrum Oberstdorf. The compulsory dance was the Rhumba. It is an international senior-level figure skating competition organized by the Deutsche Eislauf-Union and held annually in Oberstdorf, Germany. The competition is named after the Nebelhorn, a nearby mountain.

It was one of the first international senior competitions of the season. Skaters were entered by their respective national federations, rather than receiving individual invitations as in the Grand Prix of Figure Skating, and competed in four disciplines: men's singles, ladies' singles, pair skating, and ice dance. The Fritz-Geiger-Memorial Trophy was presented to the country with the highest placements across all disciplines.

== Results ==
=== Men ===
Rank	Name	Nation	Total points	SP		FS	
1	Tomáš Verner	Czech Republic	194.46	1	61.46	1	133.00
2	Parker Pennington	United States	187.82	2	60.04	2	127.78
3	Vaughn Chipeur	Canada	167.04	10	50.66	3	116.38
4	Denis Leushin	Russia	159.61	6	53.02	5	106.59
5	Karel Zelenka	Italy	156.22	7	52.98	6	103.24
6	Clemens Brummer	Germany	154.18	5	53.33	8	100.85
7	Derrick Delmore	United States	154.16	3	57.30	9	96.86
8	Martin Liebers	Germany	153.14	9	50.74	7	102.40
9	Igor Macypura	Slovakia	149.34	15	40.11	4	109.23
10	Maxime-Billy Fortin	Canada	149.11	4	53.77	10	95.34
11	Przemysław Domański	Poland	144.56	8	51.82	11	92.74
12	Ari-Pekka Nurmenkari	Finland	137.82	11	46.11	12	91.71
13	Tobias Bayer	Germany	131.09	13	44.74	14	86.35
14	Tomáš Janečko	Czech Republic	125.62	12	45.18	15	80.44
15	Thomas Paulson	United Kingdom	123.40	18	33.91	13	89.49
16	Sergei Kotov	Israel	119.69	14	40.36	16	79.33
17	Adrian Matei	Romania	113.65	17	37.01	17	76.64
WD	Trifun Zivanovic	Serbia		16	39.88		
WD	Kevin van der Perren	Belgium					

=== Ladies ===
Rank	Name	Nation	Total points	SP		FS	
1	Beatrisa Liang	United States	150.76	1	53.89	1	96.87
2	Arina Martinova	Russia	132.04	3	46.03	2	86.01
3	Katy Taylor	United States	130.22	4	45.61	3	84.61
4	Amanda Billings	Canada	123.57	2	46.77	5	76.80
5	Lina Johansson	Sweden	114.90	6	35.18	4	79.72
6	Cindy Carquillat	Switzerland	106.14	5	39.02	7	67.12
7	Kristin Wieczorek	Germany	101.00	8	32.79	6	68.21
8	Constanze Paulinus	Germany	98.62	9	31.50	8	67.12
9	Isabelle Pieman	Belgium	85.79	10	29.96	9	55.83
10	Sonia Radeva	Bulgaria	77.96	11	28.05	11	49.91
11	Maria Balaba	Latvia	76.82	13	24.39	10	52.43
12	Cornelia Beyermann	Germany	74.31	12	26.30	12	48.01
WD	Karin Brandstätter	Austria		7	34.56		
WD	Ina Seterbakken	Germany					

=== Pairs ===
Rank	Name	Nation	Total points	SP		FS	
1	Brooke Castile / Benjamin Okolski	United States	144.98	4	44.89	1	100.09
2	Julia Vlassov / Drew Meekins	United States	141.12	2	46.97	2	94.15
3	Angelika Pylkina / Niklas Hogner	Sweden	139.68	1	48.80	3	90.88
4	Mylène Brodeur / John Mattatall	Canada	135.85	3	46.93	4	88.92
5	Arina Ushakova / Sergei Karev	Russia	125.30	5	42.77	5	82.53
6	Jessica Miller / Ian Moram	Canada	124.39	6	42.23	6	82.16
7	Dominika Piątkowska / Dmitri Khromin	Poland	113.57	7	39.71	7	73.86
8	Rumiana Spassova / Stanimir Todorov	Bulgaria	103.84	9	35.95	8	67.89
9	Stacey Kemp / David King	United Kingdom	99.20	10	32.67	9	66.53
WD	Julia Beloglazova / Andrei Bekh	Ukraine		8	38.25		
WD	Mari Vartmann / Florian Just	Germany					

=== Ice dance ===
Rank	Name	Nation	Total points	CD		OD		FD	
1	Sinead Kerr / John Kerr	United Kingdom	166.20	1	31.89	2	51.65	1	82.66
2	Morgan Matthews / Maxim Zavozin	United States	165.21	2	30.78	1	51.89	2	82.54
3	Alexandra Zaretski / Roman Zaretski	Israel	156.67	3	30.28	3	49.34	3	77.05
4	Alexandra Kauc / Michał Zych	Poland	145.68	4	28.23	4	44.84	4	72.61
5	Siobhan Karam / Joshua McGrath	Canada	137.55	5	26.87	5	43.09	8	67.59
6	Katherine Leigh Copely / Deividas Stagniūnas	Lithuania	135.71	8	24.15	6	42.45	5	69.11
7	Allie Hann-McCurdy / Michael Coreno	Canada	133.45	7	24.42	7	41.14	7	67.89
8	Kate Slattery / Ghuen-Gun Lee	United States	130.77	9	23.46	9	39.19	6	68.12
9	Phillipa Towler-Green / Phillip Poole	United Kingdom	129.65	6	25.11	8	40.49	9	64.05
10	Barbora Silná / Dmitri Matsjuk	Austria	115.23	10	22.62	10	38.61	10	54.00
11	Clover Zatzman / Aurimas Radisauskas	Lithuania	97.20	12	17.61	11	32.22	11	47.37
12	Aleksandra Gott / Iliya Koreshev	Estonia	90.68	11	17.67	12	27.65	12	45.36
