= Cindy Bortz =

American figure skater

Personal information
- Full name: Cindy Bortz-Gould
- Born: Cindy Bortz Tarzana, California
- Home town: Tarzana, California
- Height: 4 ft 8 in (142 cm)

Figure skating career
- Country: United States
Medal record
Ladies' singles figure skating
Representing the United States

Cindy Bortz-Gould is an American former figure skater. She is the 1987 World Junior Figure Skating champion.

== Biography ==
Bortz was born and raised in Tarzana, California, and is Jewish. She began skating at eight years old, and entered her first competition a year later. In 1985 she came in second in the Novice Level at the 1985 U.S. Figure Skating Championships.

At age 14, 4-foot-8-inches tall and weighing 80 pounds, Bortz won the Junior Ladies gold medal at the 1986 U.S. National Figure Skating Championships, beating silver medalist Susanne Becher of West Germany. During the competition she became the first junior woman to successfully perform the difficult Triple Lutz. She then came in second to Jill Trenary at the U.S. Olympic Sports Festival.

Bortz won the 1987 World Junior Figure Skating Championships in Kitchener, Ontario, Canada, at 15 years of age, and the 1987 Prize of Moscow. That year Bortz was a U.S. National Team alternate.

In 1988, she won the Novarat Trophy in Budapest, Hungary, and came in seventh at the 1988 U.S. Figure Skating Championships. In 1989, Bortz won the Prize of Moscow in Russia, and came in seventh at the 1989 U.S. Figure Skating Championships.

Bortz married in 1994. She coaches skating in Simi Valley, California.

Bortz was inducted into the Southern California Jewish Sports Hall of Fame in 2006.

Bortz-Gould appeared on TLC's show Ice Diaries in 2006, where one of her students, Danielle Kahle, was featured.

== Results ==
International
| Event | 1985–86 | 1986–87 | 1987–88 | 1988–89 |
|---|---|---|---|---|
| World Junior Championships | | 1st | | |
| Prize of Moscow News | | | 1st | |
National
| U.S. Championships | 1st J. | 6th | 7th | 7th |

== See also ==
- List of Jewish figure skaters
