= Abigail Pietersen =

South African figure skater

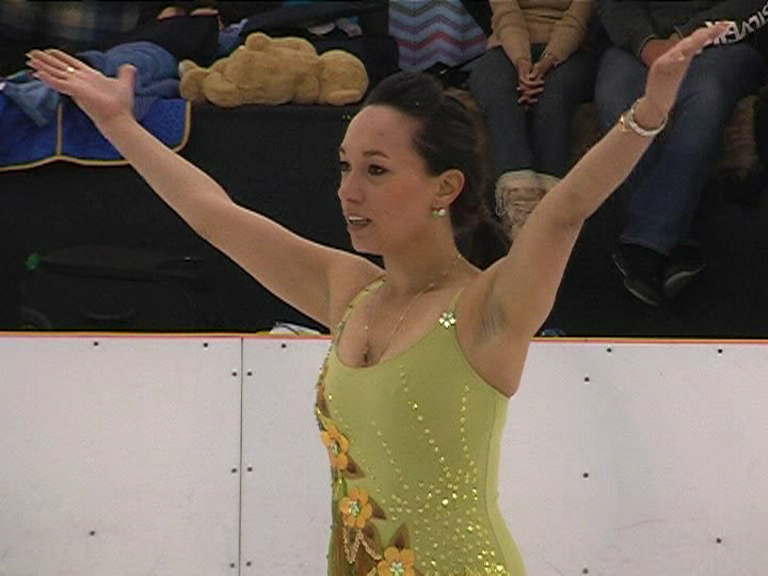

Personal information
- Born: 1 October 1984 (age 41) Cape Town, South Africa
- Height: 1.50 m (4 ft 11 in)

Figure skating career
- Country: South Africa
- Coach: Oula Jääskeläinen; Fanis Shakirzianau
- Skating club: Western Province

Abigail Pietersen (born 1 October 1984, in Cape Town) is a South African former competitive figure skater. She is the 2010 South African national champion and qualified to the free skate at three Four Continents Championships (2003, 2004, 2007). She switched to pair skating in 2005, but later switched back to singles. Her younger brother, Justin Pietersen, also competed internationally in figure skating.

== Programs ==
Season	Short program	Free skating
2009–2010	Mario Takes a Walk by Jesse Cook	Medley by Genesis
2008–2009	Thoroughly Modern Millie by Jeanine Tresori	Bombay Awakes by A. R. Rahman; Syriana by Alexandre Desplat; Ganesh by A. R. Rahman
2007–2008	Malagueña by Ernesto Lecuona	Valley of Dreams by John Tesh
2006–2007	Tango de los Exilados by Walter Taieb performed by Vanessa-Mae	Valley of Dreams by John Tesh
2003–2004	Souvenir by Keiko Matsui	Indian melody by Mohabbattin
2002–2003	Alone by Robert Fine	Indian melody by Mohabbattin

== Results ==
International
Event	01–02	02–03	03–04	04–05	05–06	06–07	07–08	08–09	09–10
Worlds									49th
Four Continents		23rd	24th			23rd	26th	32nd	29th
Golden Bear	9th J								
National
South African	1st J	1st J	3rd	3rd		2nd	2nd	3rd	1st
J = Junior level
