= Figure skating at the 2009 Winter Universiade =

- Type: Senior international
- Date: February 21 – 24
- Season: 2008–09
- Location: Harbin, China
- Venue: Harbin International Convention Exhibition and Sports Center

Champions
- Men's singles: (China) Xu Ming
- Ladies' singles: (Japan) Yukari Nakano
- Pairs: (China) Zhang Dan / Zhang Hao
- Ice dance: (Israel) Alexandra Zaretski / Roman Zaretski
- Synchronized skating: Team Sweden
- Previous: 2007 Winter Universiade
- Next: 2011 Winter Universiade

Figure skating was competed at the 2009 Winter Universiade. Skaters competed in the disciplines of men's singles, ladies' singles, pair skating, ice dancing, and synchronized skating. It took place between February 21 and 24, 2009 at the Harbin International Convention Exhibition and Sports Center.

== Notes ==
The compulsory dance was the Paso Doble.

== Schedules ==
(Local Time, UTC +09:00)

- February 21, 2009
  - 14:10: Ice dancing - compulsory dance
  - 16:20: Men - short program
  - 21:25: Pairs - short program
- February 22, 2009
  - 13:00: Ice dancing - original dance
  - 15:35: Pairs - free skating
  - 17:05: Men - free skating
- February 23, 2009
  - 14:00: Ladies - short program
  - 18:50: Ice dancing - free dance
  - 21:50: Synchronized skating - short program
- February 24, 2009
  - 14:30: Ladies - free skating
  - 20:00: Synchronized Skating - free skating

== Medal table ==
Rank	Nation	Gold	Silver	Bronze	Total
1	China (CHN)	2	0	1	3
2	Japan (JPN)	1	1	0	2
3	Israel (ISR)	1	0	0	1
3	Sweden (SWE)	1	0	0	1
5	Russia (RUS)	0	3	1	4
6	Finland (FIN)	0	1	1	2
7	France (FRA)	0	0	1	1
7	Ukraine (UKR)	0	0	1	1
Totals (8 entries)		5	5	5	15

== Results ==
=== Men ===
Rank	Name	Nation	Total points	SP		FS	
1	Xu Ming	China	179.96	5	64.50	2	115.46
2	Artem Borodulin	Russia	179.37	2	66.25	3	113.12
3	Alban Préaubert	France	175.34	1	66.35	5	108.99
4	Wu Jialiang	China	174.15	7	63.75	4	110.40
5	Tatsuki Machida	Japan	173.16	4	64.70	7	108.46
6	Paolo Bacchini	Italy	170.56	3	65.59	11	104.97
7	Konstantin Menshov	Russia	169.29	25	45.60	1	123.69
8	Takemochi Ogami	Japan	168.12	8	59.15	6	108.97
9	Yoann Deslot	France	165.30	6	64.39	15	100.91
10	Martin Liebers	Germany	161.82	12	55.49	10	106.33
11	Kristoffer Berntsson	Sweden	160.13	9	56.37	12	103.76
12	Gao Song	China	158.60	11	55.62	13	102.98
13	Jason Wong	United States	155.25	19	48.83	9	106.42
14	Boris Martinec	Croatia	152.89	17	50.55	14	102.34
15	Alexandr Kazakov	Belarus	151.36	14	53.79	18	97.57
16	Vitali Sazonets	Ukraine	150.69	27	43.47	8	107.22
17	Vladimir Uspenski	Russia	150.21	10	55.67	19	94.54
18	Przemysław Domański	Poland	149.80	16	51.20	17	98.60
19	Pavel Kaška	Czech Republic	146.90	24	46.90	16	100.00
20	Thomas Paulson	United Kingdom	139.09	18	48.95	20	90.14
21	Jamal Othman	Switzerland	137.73	22	48.12	21	89.61
22	Maxim Shipov	Israel	136.55	23	47.79	23	88.76
23	Clemens Brummer	Germany	133.77	15	51.79	25	81.98
24	Manuel Koll	Austria	133.17	26	44.73	24	88.44
25	Michael Biondi	Germany	129.72	30	40.26	22	89.46
26	Yasuharu Nanri	Japan	127.26	13	54.27	30	72.99
27	Christopher Boyadji	France	126.62	20	48.33	26	78.29
28	Valtter Virtanen	Finland	123.92	21	48.27	28	75.65
29	Kutay Eryoldas	Turkey	118.20	28	41.79	27	76.41
30	Alper Uçar	Turkey	113.21	31	38.86	29	74.35
31	Luka Čadež	Slovenia	106.94	29	41.08	32	65.86
32	Wun-Chang Shih	Chinese Taipei	100.50	32	31.82	31	68.68
33	Adrian Alvarado	Mexico	84.08	33	27.33	33	56.75

=== Ladies ===
Rank	Name	Nation	Total points	SP		FS	
1	Yukari Nakano	Japan	154.63	4	52.70	1	101.93
2	Nana Takeda	Japan	152.91	2	53.20	2	99.71
3	Kiira Korpi	Finland	148.22	1	58.96	4	89.26
4	Jelena Glebova	Estonia	146.42	3	52.90	3	93.52
5	Katarina Gerboldt	Russia	138.40	5	51.88	8	86.52
6	Gwendoline Didier	France	135.52	9	46.26	5	89.26
7	Kim Na-young	South Korea	132.43	12	45.42	7	87.01
8	Xu Binshu	China	129.81	11	45.86	9	83.95
9	Linnea Mellgren	Sweden	125.28	22	36.50	6	88.78
10	Alexandra Ievleva	Russia	123.93	13	44.82	11	79.11
11	Tuğba Karademir	Turkey	122.89	7	47.24	14	75.65
12	Kim Chae-hwa	South Korea	122.07	6	48.30	17	73.77
13	Constanze Paulinus	Germany	121.97	20	38.76	10	83.21
14	Liu Yan	China	121.54	14	44.62	12	76.92
15	Arina Martinova	Russia	121.09	8	46.80	16	74.29
16	Nicole Graf	Switzerland	116.05	16	43.00	18	73.05
17	Teodora Poštič	Slovenia	115.84	18	40.12	13	75.72
18	Ayumi Miyamoto	Japan	115.35	10	46.00	21	69.35
19	Viktória Pavuk	Hungary	114.63	19	39.90	15	74.73
20	Nella Simaová	Czech Republic	113.99	15	43.30	20	70.69
21	Sin Na-hee	South Korea	107.82	23	35.82	19	72.00
22	Amy Nunn	United States	99.90	21	36.98	23	62.92
23	Wang Yueren	China	99.47	24	35.08	22	64.39
24	Denise Koegl	Austria	98.63	17	40.84	25	57.79
25	Ekaterina Proyda	Ukraine	92.15	25	34.86	26	57.29
26	Charissa Tansomboon	Thailand	90.63	26	33.72	27	56.91
27	Minna Parviainen	Finland	87.12	27	26.08	24	61.04
28	Dora Strabic	Croatia	72.61	28	24.42	28	48.19

=== Pairs ===
Rank	Name	Nation	Total points	SP		FS	
1	Zhang Dan / Zhang Hao	China	195.32	1	68.32	1	127.00
2	Ksenia Ozerova / Alexander Enbert	Russia	146.10	2	51.42	3	94.68
3	Dong Huibo / Wu Yiming	China	143.63	6	46.08	2	97.55
4	Li Jiaqi / Xu Jiankun	China	136.44	4	47.96	4	88.48
5	Andrea Best / Trevor Young	United States	131.92	3	48.14	5	83.78
6	Ksenia Krasilnikova / Konstantin Bezmaternikh	Russia	129.46	5	46.88	6	82.58
7	Ekaterina Kostenko / Roman Talan	Ukraine	114.35	7	41.52	7	72.83

=== Ice dancing ===
Rank	Name	Nation	Total points	CD		OD		FD	
1	Alexandra Zaretski / Roman Zaretski	Israel	177.43	1	34.77	1	53.67	1	88.99
2	Ekaterina Rubleva / Ivan Shefer	Russia	170.43	2	34.43	2	52.10	2	83.90
3	Alla Beknazarova / Vladimir Zuev	Ukraine	163.07	3	33.44	4	50.54	5	79.09
4	Kristina Gorshkova / Vitali Butikov	Russia	162.83	4	32.05	3	50.98	3	79.80
5	Ekaterina Bobrova / Dmitri Soloviev	Russia	157.43	5	30.64	6	47.26	4	79.53
6	Carolina Hermann / Daniel Hermann	Germany	152.43	7	28.35	5	48.43	6	75.65
7	Huang Xintong / Zheng Xun	China	145.00	6	28.73	7	47.14	9	69.13
8	Zoé Blanc / Pierre-Loup Bouquet	France	141.42	9	26.82	8	42.13	7	72.47
9	Isabella Pajardi / Stefano Caruso	Italy	136.86	11	25.13	9	40.59	8	71.14
10	Nadezhda Frolenkova / Mikhail Kasalo	Ukraine	133.06	10	26.23	11	39.63	11	67.20
11	Yu Xiaoyang / Wang Chen	China	132.76	8	28.02	14	36.23	10	68.51
12	Kamila Hájková / David Vincour	Czech Republic	126.35	12	24.76	12	38.46	12	63.13
13	Louise Walden / Owen Edwards	United Kingdom	120.98	13	24.12	10	39.81	15	57.05
14	Guo Jiameimei / Meng Fei	China	119.58	15	22.62	13	36.84	14	60.12
15	Penny Coomes / Nicholas Buckland	United Kingdom	117.13	14	22.86	15	32.69	13	61.58
16	Emi Hirai / Ayato Yuzawa	Japan	97.26	16	19.31	16	26.49	16	51.46

=== Synchronized skating ===
Rank	Team	Nation	Total points	SP		FS	
1	Team Sweden	Sweden	206.48	1	77.56	2	128.92
2	Team Finland	Finland	202.28	2	70.10	1	132.18
3	Team Russia	Russia	173.19	3	61.59	3	111.60
4	Team USA	United States	148.02	4	55.05	4	92.97
5	Team Switzerland	Switzerland	123.89	5	46.86	5	77.03
