= South African Figure Skating Championships =

Recurring figure skating competition

- Status: Active
- Genre: National championships
- Frequency: Annual
- Country: South Africa
- Organiser: South African Figure Skating Association

The South African Figure Skating Championships are an annual figure skating competition organized by the South African Figure Skating Association to crown the national champions of South Africa. Figure skating was first practiced in South Africa when a temporary ice rink was installed at the Empire Exhibition in Johannesburg in 1936. The South African Figure Skating Association became a member of the International Skating Union in 1938. In 1970, three new provinces – Eastern Province (Port Elizabeth), Northern Transvaal (Pretoria), and Western Province (Cape Town) – joined the skating federation to create a true national federation.

194 skaters competed in the 1991/92 South African championships; about 25% were black. "Sport in our country is going to play a major role to complement the political situation," said Daniel Mayo, the national organizer of South Africa's National and Olympic Sports Congress, who was also imprisoned on Robben Island with Nelson Mandela during the 1980s. Mayo acknowledged the irony of a white-dominated sport helping to dispel the influence of apartheid, but noted that ice skating was gaining popularity among black South Africans.

For forty-nine years, South Africa was the only member nation from all of Africa, until Morocco joined in 2011.

Medals are awarded in men's singles, women's singles, pair skating, and ice dance at the senior and junior levels, although not every discipline may necessarily be held every year due to a lack of participants.

== Senior medalists ==
=== Men's singles ===
Men's event medalists
Season	Location	Gold	Silver	Bronze	Ref.
1954–55	Johannesburg	Arthur Chapman	Andre Erlank	No other competitors	
1955–56		Arthur Chapman			
1956–57		Arthur Chapman			
1957–58		Lennie Mills	Ronald Hughes		
1958–59		Lennie Mills			
1959–64	No men's competitors				
1964–65	Durban	Brian O'Shea			
1965–66		Brian O'Shea	Paul Wolozyn	No other competitors	
1969–70		Paul Wolozyn			
1970–71	Pretoria	Paul Wolozyn			
1971–72		No men's competitors			
1972–73	Cape Town	Robert Dunn			
1973–74	Durban	No gold medal awarded (Note: Stephen Melville did not achieve the required standards in compulsory figures to be named the South African Champion; he was awarded the second place medal instead.)	Stephen Melville	No other competitors	
1974–75	Johannesburg	Stephen Melville	Jeremy Dowson		
1975–76	Johannesburg	Johannes Potgieter	Jeremy Dowson	Stephen Melville	
1976–77	Johannesburg	Johannes Potgieter	Lenel van den Berg	Jeremy Dowson	
1977–78	Johannesburg	Jeremy Dowson	Lenel van den Berg	Garry Braid	
1978–79	Johannesburg	Jeremy Dowson	Garry Braid	No other competitors	
1979–80		Rick Simons	No other competitors		
1980–81		Rick Simons	No other competitors		
1981–82		Rick Simons			
1982–83		Rick Simons			
1983–84		Rick Simons			
1984–85		Rick Simons			
1985–86		Daniel Voges			
1986–87		Rick Simons			
1987–88					
1988–89		Dino Quattrocecere			
1989–90		Dino Quattrocecere			
1990–91		Dino Quattrocecere			
1991–92		Dino Quattrocecere			
1992–93		Dino Quattrocecere			
1993–94					
1994–95		Robert Ward			
1995–96		Robert Ward			
1996–97		Ferdi Skoberla	Paul Slabbert	Etienne Dreyer	
1997–98	Cape Town	Ferdi Skoberla	Paul Slabbert	Etienne Dreyer	
1998–99	Johannesburg	Ferdi Skoberla	No other competitors		
1999–2000	Cape Town	No men's competitors			
2000–01	Pretoria	Dino Quattrocecere	Gareth Echardt	No other competitors	
2000–02	Cape Town	Dino Quattrocecere	No other competitors		
2000–03	Cape Town	Dino Quattrocecere	Gareth Echardt	No other competitors	
2003–04	Cape Town	No men's competitors			
2004–05	Cape Town	Justin Pietersen	Gareth Echardt	No other competitors	
2005–06	Cape Town	Matthew Wilkinson	Gareth Echardt	Justin Pietersen	
2006–07	Cape Town	Justin Pietersen	Gareth Echardt	No other competitors	
2007–08	Kempton Park	Justin Pietersen	No other competitors		
2008–09	Cape Town	Justin Pietersen	No other competitors		
2009–10	Pretoria	Justin Pietersen	No other competitors		
2010–11	Cape Town	Justin Pietersen	No other competitors		
2011–12	Kempton Park	Paul Richardeau (France)	No other competitors		
2012–13	Pretoria	No men's competitors			
2013–14	Pretoria	Johann Wilkinson	No other competitors		
2014–15	Cape Town	Johann Wilkinson	No other competitors		
2015–16	Cape Town	Johann Wilkinson	No other competitors		
2016–17	Durban	Matthew Samuels	No other competitors		
2017–18	Pretoria	Matthew Samuels	No other competitors		
2018–19	Cape Town	Matthew Samuels	No other competitors		
2019–20	Competition cancelled due to the COVID-19 pandemic				
2020–21	Centurion	Matthew Samuels	Evan Wrensch	Sinali Sango	
2021–22	Cape Town	Evan Wrensch	No other competitors		
2022–23	Pretoria	Evan Wrensch	No other competitors		
2023–25	No men's competitors				
2025–26	Cape Town	Cody Kock	Sinali Sango	No other competitors	

=== Women's singles ===
Women's event medalists
Season	Location	Gold	Silver	Bronze	Ref.
1952–53		Coreen Van Heerden			
1953–54		Coreen Van Heerden			
1954–55	Johannesburg	Yvonne Upcott	Coreen Van Heerden	No other competitors	
1955–56		Yvonne Upcott			
1956–57		Louise Dahl			
1957–58		Patricia Eastwood	Pauline Gawler	June Elliott	
1958–59		Patricia Eastwood	Marion Sage		
1959–60		Marion Sage			
1960–65	No women's competitors				
1965–66	Durban	Ann Smith			
1966–67		Marcelle Matthews	Margaret Betts	Glenda O'Shea	
1967–68		Margaret Betts			
1968–69		Margaret Betts			
1969–70		Marcelle Matthews	Vanessa Jackson	Glenda O'Shea	
1970–71		Vanessa Jackson			
1971–72	Pretoria	Vanessa Jackson			
1972–73	Cape Town	Ann Broadhurst			
1973–74	Durban	Pamela Smith			
1974–75	Johannesburg	Karen Hayne			
1975–76	Johannesburg	Lynne Rayner	Tammy Grenfell	Jane Howard	
1976–77	Johannesburg	Lynne Rayner	Irene Anderson	Tammy Grenfell	
1977–78	Johannesburg	Lynne Rayner	Tammy Grenfell	Irene Anderson	
1978–79	Johannesburg	Tammy Grenfell	No other competitors		
1979–80	Pretoria	Irene Anderson	Sheryl Lane	No other competitors	
1980–81	Pretoria	Irene Anderson		No other competitors	
1981–82	Pretoria	Barbara-Anne Hawkes			
1982–83	Pretoria	Adrianne Platt			
1983–84	Pretoria	Adrianne Platt			
1984–85		Andrea Lief			
1985–86		Barbara-Anne Hawkes			
1986–87		Andrea Lief			
1987–88					
1988–89		Barbara-Anne Hawkes			
1989–90					
1990–91		Juanita-Anne Yorke			
1991–92		Juanita-Anne Yorke			
1992–93		Barbara-Anne Hawkes	Juanita-Anne Yorke	Kim Harris	
1993–94					
1994–95	Johannesburg	Claire Auret	Paula Stephenson		
1995–96		Shirene Human			
1996–97		Shirene Human	Natasha Bilik	Chantal de Bruin	
1997–98	Cape Town	Shirene Human	Paula Stephenson	Chantal de Bruin	
1998–99	Johannesburg	Shirene Human	Simone Joseph	Paula Stephenson	
1999–2000	Cape Town	Shirene Human	Simone Joseph	Tracy Downey	
2000–01	Pretoria	Shirene Human	Quinn Wilmans	Tracy Downey	
2001–02	Cape Town	Shirene Human	Jenna-Anne Buys	Quinn Wilmans	
2002–03	Cape Town	Shirene Human	Jenna-Anne Buys	Cherie Van Heerden	
2003–04	Cape Town	Jenna-Anne Buys	Shirene Human	Abigail Pietersen	
2004–05	Cape Town	Shirene Human	Jenna-Anne Buys	Abigail Pietersen	
2005–06	Cape Town	Jenna-Anne Buys	No other competitors		
2006–07	Cape Town	Jenna-Anne Buys	Abigail Pietersen	No other competitors	
2007–08	Kempton Park	Lejeanne Marais	Abigail Pietersen	No other competitors	
2008–09	Cape Town	Lejeanne Marais	Megan Allely	Abigail Pietersen	
2009–10	Pretoria	Abigail Pietersen	Lejeanne Marais	Kim Falconer	
2010–11	Cape Town	Lejeanne Marais	Kim Falconer	No other competitors	
2011–12	Kempton Park	Lejeanne Marais	Chloé Dépouilly (France)	Nadia Geldenhuys	
2012–13	Cape Town	Lejeanne Marais	Kim Falconer	Nadia Geldenhuys	
2013–14	Pretoria	Lejeanne Marais	Nadia Geldenhuys	Kim Falconer	
2014–15	Cape Town	Michaela du Toit	Kim Falconer	No other competitors	
2015–16	Cape Town	Nadia Geldenhuys	No other competitors		
2016–17	Durban	Michaela du Toit	Kathryn Winstanley	No other competitors	
2017–18	Pretoria	Kathryn Winstanley	No other competitors		
2018–19	Cape Town	Kathryn Winstanley	No other competitors		
2019–20	Competition cancelled due to the COVID-19 pandemic				
2020–21	Centurion	Kathryn Winstanley	No other competitors		
2021–22	Cape Town	Gian-Quen Isaacs	Kathryn Winstanley	Abigail Samuels	
2022–23	Pretoria	Abigail Samuels	No other competitors		
2023–24	Cape Town	Gian-Quen Isaacs	No other competitors		
2024–25	Centurion	Gian-Quen Isaacs	No other competitors		
2025–26	Cape Town	Gian-Quen Isaacs	Keva Emond	Haley-Rae Thomson	

=== Pairs ===
Pairs event medalists
Season	Location	Gold	Silver	Bronze	Ref.
1947–48		Audrey McCue & Travers Penrose			
1948–49		Audrey McCue & Travers Penrose			
1949–50		Audrey McCue & Travers Penrose			
1950–51		June Callaghan & Travers Penrose			
1951–52		June Callaghan & Travers Penrose			
1952–53		June Callaghan & Travers Penrose			
1953–54		Yvonne Upcott; Travers Penrose			
1954–55		Yvonne Upcott; Travers Penrose			
1955–56	Johannesburg	Susan Ford; Andre Erlank	Yvonne Upcott; Travers Penrose	No other competitors	
1956–57		Yvonne Upcott; Travers Penrose			
1957–58		Yvonne Upcott; Travers Penrose			
1958–59		Barbara Matthews; Lennie Mills	Wendy Creux & Clive Phipson	Pauline Gawler & Basil Michael	
1959–60		Barbara Matthews; Lennie Mills	Glenda O'Shea; Brian O'Shea	No other competitors	
1960–65	No pairs competitors				
1965–66	Durban	Glenda O'Shea; Brian O'Shea			
1966–67		Glenda O'Shea; Brian O'Shea	Janina Woloszyn & Paul Woloszyn	No other competitors	
1967–68		Glenda O'Shea; Brian O'Shea			
1968–69		Glenda O'Shea; Brian O'Shea			
1969–70		Glenda O'Shea; Brian O'Shea	Lynette Dunn; Gavin Crompton	No other competitors	
1970–71		Janina Woloszyn & Paul Woloszyn			
1971–72	Pretoria	Janina Woloszyn & Paul Woloszyn			
1972–73	Cape Town	Doreen Crofton; Michael Ashton			
1973–74	Durban	Louise Buttle; Lenel van den Berg	Jane Howard; Peter Swemmer	No other competitors	
1974–75	Johannesburg	Louise Buttle; Lenel van den Berg	Jane Howard; Peter Swemmer	No other competitors	
1975–76	Johannesburg	Margaret McIntyre; Lenel van den Berg			
1976–77	Johannesburg	Margaret McIntyre; Lenel van den Berg	No other competitors		
1977–78	Johannesburg	Helga Balk; Gavin MacPherson	Tracey Egan; Gary Culverwell	No other competitors	
1978–79	Johannesburg	Helga Balk; Gavin MacPherson	No other competitors		
1979–80		Barbara-Anne Hawkes & Grant Walker	Antoinette Els & Gerald Taljaard	No other competitors	
1980–81		Helga Balk; Gavin MacPherson	Antoinette Els & Gerald Taljaard	No other competitors	
1981–82		Barbara-Anne Hawkes & Grant Walker			
1982–83		Lisa Quattrocecere; Rick Simons			
1983–84		Antoinette Els & Gerald Taljaard			
1984–85		Antoinette Els & Gerald Taljaard			
1985–86		Antoinette Els & Gerald Taljaard			
1986–87		No pairs competitors			
1987–88		Delene McKenzie & B. Voges			
1988–89					
1989–90					
1990–91					
1991–92		Claire Auret & Chris van Rensburg			
1992–93					
1993–94					
1994–95	Johannesburg				
1996–2018	No pairs competitors				
2018–19	Cape Town	Eloise Papka; Johann Wilkinson	No other competitors		
2019–20	Competition cancelled due to the COVID-19 pandemic				
2020–21	Centurion	No pairs competitors			
2021–22	Cape Town	Julia Mauder; Johann Wilkinson	No other competitors		
2022–23	Pretoria	Julia Mauder; Johann Wilkinson	No other competitors		
2023–26	No pairs competitors				

=== Ice dance ===
Ice dance event medalists
Season	Location	Gold	Silver	Bronze	Ref.
1954–55	Johannesburg	Coreen van Heerden; Cliff West	Yvonne Upcott; Travers Penrose		
1964–65	Durban	Glenda O'Shea; Brian O'Shea			
1967–73	No ice dance competitors				
1973–74	Durban	Elayne Reeve; Jan Kitching	No other competitors		
1974–75	Johannesburg	No ice dance competitors			
1975–76	Johannesburg	Lesley Robinson; John Bonny	No other competitors		
1976–77	Johannesburg	Anita Gray; Garry Braid	No other competitors		
1977–78	Johannesburg	Gavin MacPherson; Carol Brown	No other competitors		
1978–79	Johannesburg	Gavin MacPherson; Carol Brown	Robert du Plessis; Helga Balk		

== Junior medalists ==
=== Men's singles ===
Junior men's event medalists
Season	Location	Gold	Silver	Bronze	Ref.
1997–98	Cape Town	No gold medal awarded (Note: None of the competitors achieved the necessary score to named the South African Junior Champion.)	Martin van Heerden	Ryan Alcock	
1998–99	Johannesburg	Winston Whitehead	Ryan Alcock	Claude Michaels	
1999–2000	Cape Town	Gareth Echardt	Winston Whitehead	Ryan Alcock	
2000–01	Pretoria	Ryan Alcock	No other competitors		
2001–02	Cape Town	Ra'eez Hendricks	No other competitors		
2002–03	Cape Town	Konrad Giering	Justin Pietersen	No other competitors	
2003–04	Cape Town	Konrad Giering	Justin Pietersen	Ra'eez Hendricks	
2004–05	Cape Town	Keagan Cafun	Konrad Giering	No other competitors	
2005–06	Cape Town	Konrad Giering	No other competitors		
2006–07	Cape Town	Konrad Giering	No other competitors		
2007–11	No junior men's competitors				
2011–12	Kempton Park	Johann Wilkinson	No other competitors		
2012–13	Pretoria	Ancio van Tonder	No other competitors		
2013–14	Pretoria	Ancio van Tonder	Matthew Samuels	Joshua Rees	
2014–15	Cape Town	Matthew Samuels	Ancio van Tonder	No other competitors	
2015–16	Cape Town	Matthew Samuels	Evan Wrensch	No other competitors	
2016–17	Durban	Evan Wrensch	No other competitors		
2017–18	Pretoria	Evan Wrensch	Sinali Sango	No other competitors	
2018–19	Cape Town	Evan Wrensch	Sinali Sango	No other competitors	
2019–20	Competition cancelled due to the COVID-19 pandemic				
2020–21	Centurion	Nicolas van de Vijver	No other competitors		
2021–22	Cape Town	Nicolas van de Vijver	Cody Kock	No other competitors	
2022–23	Pretoria	Nicolas van de Vijver	Cody Kock	Jonathan Wilson	
2023–24	Cape Town	Cody Kock	Nicolas van de Vijver	No other competitors	
2024–25	Centurion	Cody Kock	No other competitors		
2025–26	Cape Town	No junior men's competitors			

=== Women's singles ===
Junior women's event medalists
Season	Location	Gold	Silver	Bronze	Ref.
1997–98	Cape Town	Hayley Gething	Tatum Tebbutt	Tracey Rogers	
1998–99	Johannesburg	Quinn Wilmans	Tatum Tebbutt	Tracey Rogers	
1999–2000	Cape Town	Quinn Wilmans	Hayley Gething	Janine Beron	
2000–01	Pretoria	Cherie van Heerden	Sharlene Botha	Janine Beron	
2001–02	Cape Town	Abigail Pietersen	Janine Beron	No other competitors	
2002–03	Cape Town	Abigail Pietersen	Jessica Amundsen	Megan Allely	
2003–04	Cape Town	Megan Allely	No other competitors		
2004–05	Cape Town	Lauren Henry	Megan Allely	Lejeanne Marais	
2005–06	Cape Town	Megan Allely	Lauren Henry	Lejeanne Marais	
2006–07	Cape Town	Siobhan McColl	Lejeanne Marais	Megan Allely	
2007–08	Kempton Park	Siobhan McColl	Megan Allely	Talitha Loftus	
2008–09	Cape Town	Talitha Loftus	Kim Falconer	Tamarah Jacobs	
2009–10	Pretoria	Nadia Geldenhuys	Anette Lande (Norway)	Jessica Skinner	
2010–11	Cape Town	Nadia Geldenhuys	Meredith Potgieter	No other competitors	
2011–12	Kempton Park	Simonn Erwee	Meredith Potgieter	Jessica Skinner	
2012–13	Pretoria	Michaela du Toit	Kathryn Winstanley	Simonn Erwee	
2013–14	Pretoria	Michaela du Toit	Kathryn Winstanley	Simonn Erwee	
2014–15	Cape Town	Kathryn Winstanley	Courtney Kuhn	Lara Valenti	
2015–16	Cape Town	Kathryn Winstanley	Courtney Kuhn	Abigail Samuels	
2016–17	Durban	Courtney Kuhn	Abigail Samuels	Christel Viljoen	
2017–18	Pretoria	Marion Papka	Jaydean Brits	Abigail Samuels	
2018–19	Cape Town	Gian-Quen Isaacs	Abigail Samuels	Marielle Kolaja	
2019–20	Competition cancelled due to the COVID-19 pandemic				
2020–21	Centurion	Gian-Quen Isaacs	Keva Emond	Megan Timmerman	
2021–22	Cape Town	Ella Hawkes	Keva Emond	Zara-Lee Jones	
2022–23	Pretoria	Gian-Quen Isaacs	Jasmine Coetzee	Ella Hawkes	
2023–24	Cape Town	Jasmine Coetzee	Ella Hawkes	Haley-Rae Thomson	
2024–25	Centurion	Jasmine Coetzee	Ella Hawkes	Haley-Rae Thomson	
2025–26	Cape Town	Tindra Langa	Ella Hawkes	Maria Navarro Brito	

=== Ice dance ===
Junior ice dance event medalists
Season	Location	Gold	Silver	Bronze	Ref.
1997–2002	No junior ice dance competitors				
2002–03	Cape Town	Tiffany Jones; Daniel O'Hanlon	No other competitors		
2003–04	Cape Town	Tiffany Jones; Daniel O'Hanlon	Lisa Fagan; Peter Fagan	No other competitors	
2004–05	Cape Town	Lisa Fagan; Peter Fagan	No other competitors		
2005–06	Cape Town	Tamsyn Scoble; Quiesto Spieringshoek	Nicole Hayes; Umayr Davids	No other competitors	
2006–07	Cape Town	Tamsyn Scoble; Quiesto Spieringshoek	Rakshaan Hendricks; Derrick Hayward	No other competitors	
2007–08	Kempton Park	Tamsyn Scoble; Quiesto Spieringshoek	No other competitors		
2008–22	No junior ice dance competitors				
2022–23	Pretoria	Felicity Chase; Mikhail Ajam	No other competitors		
2023–24	Cape Town	Felicity Chase; Mikhail Ajam	Ella Hawkes; Jonathan Wilson	No other competitors	
2024–26	No junior ice dance competitors				
