= Lejeanne Marais =

South African figure skater

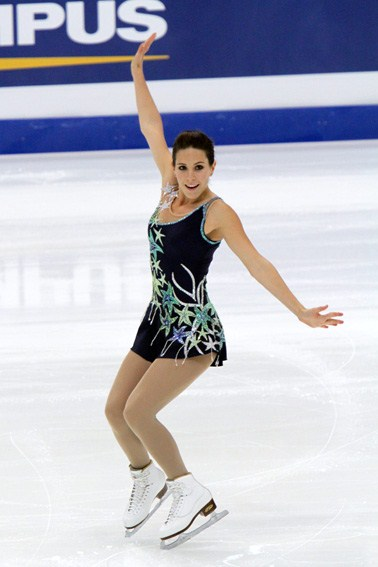
- Marais at the 2011 Four Continents Championships

Personal information
- Full name: Lejeanne Marais
- Born: 25 October 1989 (age 36) Benoni, South Africa
- Home town: Cape Town, South Africa
- Height: 1.59 m (5 ft 2 1/2 in)

Figure skating career
- Country: South Africa
- Discipline: Women's singles
- Began skating: 1996

Medal record
South African Championships
Gold medal – first place	2008 Kempton Park	Singles
Gold medal – first place	2009 Cape Town	Singles
Gold medal – first place	2011 Cape Town	Singles
Gold medal – first place	2012 Kempton Park	Singles
Gold medal – first place	2013 Cape Town	Singles
Silver medal – second place	2010 Pretoria	Singles

Lejeanne Marais (born 25 October 1989) is a South African former competitive figure skater. She is a five-time (2008, 2009, 2011, 2012, 2013) South African national champion and competed in the free skate at six Four Continents Championships. She was coached by her mother, Susan Marais, and Laurent Depouilly, in Cape Town. She studied architecture at the Tshwane University of Technology in Pretoria, South Africa.

== Programs ==
Season	Short program	Free skating
2013–2014	The Symphony Sessions by David Foster	Chocolat by Rachel Portman
2012–2013	Aria de Syrna	The Holiday by Hans Zimmer
2011–2012	Burn the Floor by Charlie Hull	The Holiday by Hans Zimmer
2010–2011	Todes by Alla Dukhova, Mikael Tariverdiev	The Holiday by Hans Zimmer
2009–2010	Todes by Alla Dukhova, Mikael Tariverdiev	Dreamer by John Debney
2008–2009	Sex and the City; Candle Will Rock by David Robbins; You Can't Stop the Beat (from Hairspray) by Marc Shaiman	Dreamer by John Debney
2007–2008	Chicago by John Kander, Fred Ebb	Casanova
2004–2005	Anastasia by Stephen Flaherty	Return to Never Land by Joel McNeely

== Results ==
International
Event	04–05	05–06	06–07	07–08	08–09	09–10	10–11	11–12	12–13	13–14	14–15
Worlds				51st	44th		36th	30th			
Four Continents				20th	28th	16th	15th	22nd	18th	21st	
Crystal Skate							7th				
Golden Spin									7th		
Nebelhorn Trophy						26th			21st	31st	
NRW Trophy									26th		
Triglav Trophy									5th		
Universiade							20th				22nd
International: Junior
JGP France	22nd										
JGP Mexico					20th						
JGP South Africa					18th						
National
South African	3rd J		2nd J	1st	1st	2nd	1st	1st	1st		
J = Junior level; JGP = Junior Grand Prix
