= Beatrisa Liang =

American figure skater

Bebe Liang
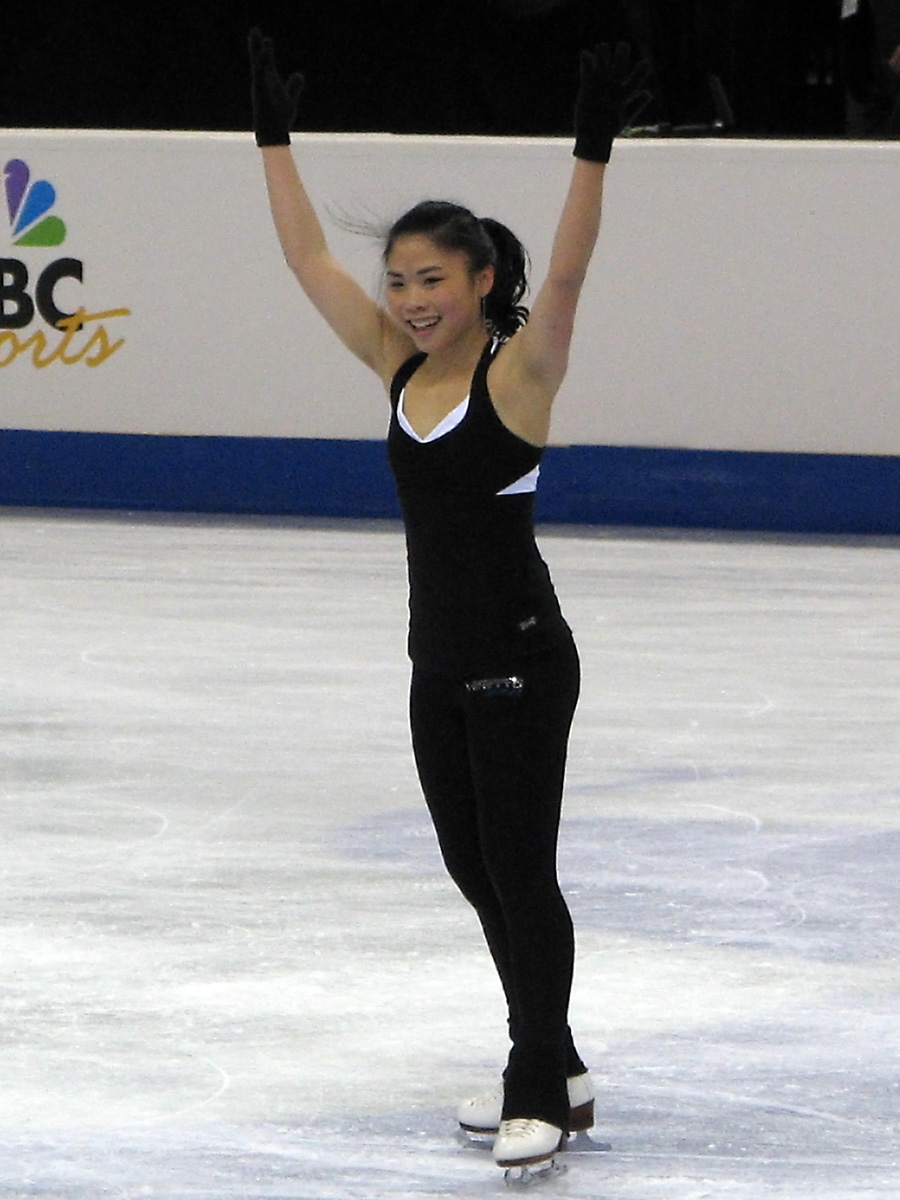
- Liang at the 2008 U.S. Championships.

Personal information
- Full name: Beatrisa Liang
- Born: March 31, 1988 (age 38) Tarzana, California, U.S.
- Height: 5 ft 0 in (152 cm)

Figure skating career
- Country: United States
- Discipline: Women's singles
- Skating club: All Year FSC
- Began skating: 1994
- Retired: 2010
Medal record
Four Continents Championships
Bronze medal – third place	2006 Colorado Springs	Women's singles

Beatrisa "Bebe" Liang (born March 31, 1988) is an American retired figure skater. She is the 2006 Four Continents bronze medalist, 2006 Nebelhorn Trophy champion, and 2007 U.S. national pewter medalist.

== Career ==
Liang was coached by Tiffany Chin for ten years until 2004.

Making her senior national debut, Liang placed sixth at the 2001 U.S. Championships, at the age of thirteen. She was assigned to the 2002 World Junior Championships and placed fourth. The following season, Liang won a pair of silver medals on the ISU Junior Grand Prix series and qualified for the JGP Final, where she placed fourth. She finished sixth at the 2003 World Junior Championships.

Liang debuted on the senior Grand Prix series in the 2003–04 season, placing fourth at the 2003 Trophée Lalique and fifth at the 2003 Cup of Russia.

In 2004, Liang changed coaches to Christy Ness in Oakland, California, commuting five hours each day. She placed fifth at the 2005 U.S. Championships and was assigned to the 2005 Four Continents Championships where she placed seventh.

In May 2005, Liang changed coaches to Frank Carroll and Ken Congemi at the Toyota Sports Center in El Segundo, California. She won bronze at the 2005 Nebelhorn Trophy and placed fourth at the 2005 Skate America. After another fifth-place finish at the U.S. Championships, Liang was sent to the 2006 Four Continents Championships and won the bronze medal. She was one of four figure skaters featured on the 2006 TLC series Ice Diaries.

In the 2006–07 season, Liang won gold at the 2006 Nebelhorn Trophy and pewter at the 2007 U.S. Championships. The following season, she came in fifth nationally, eleventh at Four Continents, and tenth in her only appearance at the senior World Championships.

Liang retired from competition in 2010.

She is currently the head coach for the Los Angeles Ice Theater Junior Team, previously coaching the Novice Team. She led the Novice team to two National silver medals and 8th place at the 2015 Nations Cup and the Junior team to a pewter medal at the 2016 National Theater on Ice Championships.

== Personal life ==
Liang is also a pianist. She graduated from California State University, Northridge, with a B.S. in kinesiology and an option in exercise science. She is also a part of C.O.S.M.I.C dance crew. She excels in many genres of dance: ballet, modern, hip hop and contemporary.

== Programs ==
Season	Short program	Free skating	Exhibition
2009–2010	El Tango de Roxanne (from Moulin Rouge!) by Mariano Mores	Symphony No. 9 "From the New World" by Antonín Dvořák; Concerto for Violin and Orchestra in D Major by Ludwig van Beethoven; Symphonic Dances Op. 46 by Sergei Rachmaninoff	
2008–2009	The Sorcerer's Apprentice by Paul Dukas	Memoirs of a Geisha by John Williams	
2007–2008	The Sorcerer's Apprentice by Paul Dukas	Yellow River Piano Concerto by Yin Chengzong and Lang Lang	
2006–2007	Firedance by David Foster	Caravan by Arthur Fiedler, Duke Ellington	Lullaby for a Stormy Night by Vienna Teng
2005–2006	Firedance by David Foster	Hope, Romance by Apocalyptica; Oblivion by Astor Piazzolla	
2004–2005	Harry Potter and the Philosopher's Stone by John Williams	Black Earth (soundtrack); Tango by Astor Piazzolla	
2003–2004	Carmen by Georges Bizet	Signs by James Newton Howard; The Mission by Ennio Morricone	Until by Sting
2002–2003	Duel by Tonči Huljić performed by Bond	Violin Concerto in D Minor by Pyotr Ilyich Tchaikovsky	Always by Sting
2001–2002	Scene d'Amour by Sarah Brightman	Incantation by Cirque du Soleil	
2000–2001	Scene d'Amour by Sarah Brightman	Symphony No. 6 by Pyotr Tchaikovsky	Anytime Anywhere by Sarah Brightman

== Competitive highlights ==
GP: Grand Prix; JGP: Junior Grand Prix

International
Event	99–00	00–01	01–02	02–03	03–04	04–05	05–06	06–07	07–08	08–09	09–10
Worlds									10th		
Four Continents						7th	3rd		11th		
GP Cup of China								5th	6th		10th
GP Cup of Russia					5th				8th		
GP France					4th					5th	
GP NHK Trophy								4th			
GP Skate America							4th				
GP Skate Canada										6th	
Nebelhorn Trophy							3rd	1st			
International: Junior
Junior Worlds			4th	6th							
JGP Final				4th							
JGP China				2nd							
JGP U.S.				2nd							
National
U.S. Champ.	6th J	6th	9th	7th	7th	5th	5th	4th	5th	14th	7th
Team events
Japan Open											2nd T 6th P
Levels: N = Novice; J = Junior; T = Team result; P = Personal result; Medals awarded for team result only.
