= Shirene Human =

South African figure skater (1980–2025)

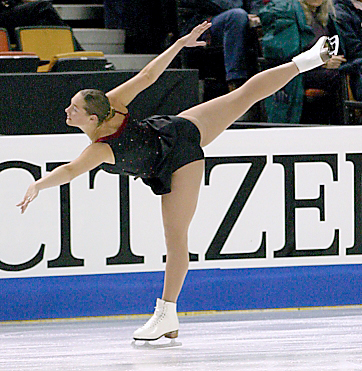
- Human in 2004

Personal information
- Born: 9 January 1980 Johannesburg, South Africa
- Died: 7 October 2025 (aged 45)
- Height: 1.67 m (5 ft 5 1/2 in)

Figure skating career
- Country: South Africa
- Coach: Fanis Shakirzianau
- Skating club: Western Province FSC
- Began skating: 1984
- Retired: c. 2005

Shirene Human (9 January 1980 – 7 October 2025) was a South African competitive figure skater. A nine-time national champion, she competed at the 1998 Winter Olympics, six World Championships, and seven Four Continents Championships. She qualified for the free skate at the Olympics in Nagano, Japan, and at the 2000 World Championships in Nice, France, finishing 24th at both events. She died on 7 October 2025 from breast cancer.

== Programs ==
| Season | Short program | Free skating |
|---|---|---|
| 2004–05 | Kissing You (from Romeo + Juliet) performed by Nellee Hooper | Peter Pan by James Newton Howard, Jim Weidman |
| 2003–04 | Kissing You (from Romeo + Juliet) performed by Nellee Hooper | Star Wars: Episode II by John Williams |
| 2002–03 | Winter by Yoad Nevo performed by Bond | Star Wars: Episode II by John Williams |
| 2001–02 | Winter by Yoad Nevo performed by Bond | Forever and Ever by Rick Wakeman |
| 2000–01 | Reflections of Passion by Yanni | Forever and Ever by Rick Wakeman |

== Results ==
International
| Event | 95–96 | 96–97 | 97–98 | 98–99 | 99–00 | 00–01 | 01–02 | 02–03 | 03–04 | 04–05 |
|---|---|---|---|---|---|---|---|---|---|---|
| Olympics | | | 24th | | | | | | | |
| Worlds | | | | 37th | 24th | 39th | 35th | 41st | | 39th |
| Four Continents | | | | 13th | 15th | 18th | 15th | 16th | 16th | 18th |
| Golden Spin | | | | | | | 16th | | | |
| Nebelhorn Trophy | | | 17th | | 12th | | 19th | | 13th | |
| Piruetten | | 5th | | | | | | | | |
| Schäfer Memorial | | | 15th | | | | | | | 11th |
National
| South African | 1st | 1st | 1st | 1st | 1st | 1st | 1st | 1st | 2nd | 1st |

Olympic Games
| Preceded by Masibulele Makepula | Flagbearer for South Africa; Nagano 1998 | Succeeded by Hezekiél Sepeng |
