= Parker Pennington =

American figure skater (born 1984)

Personal information
- Full name: Parker Blair Pennington
- Born: September 13, 1984 (age 42) Hartford, Connecticut, U.S.
- Height: 5 ft 8 in (1.73 m)

Figure skating career
- Country: United States
- Coach: Carol Heiss-Jenkins, Roberta Mitchell
- Skating club: Cleveland Skating Club
- Began skating: 1987
- Retired: 2011

Parker Blair Pennington (born September 13, 1984) is an American figure skater. He won silver medals at the 2006 Nebelhorn Trophy and 2007 Finlandia Trophy, three gold medals on the JGP series, and bronze at the 2002 JGP Final. Pennington won U.S. national titles on four levels—junior (2001), novice (1998), intermediate (1996), and juvenile (1995).

== Personal life ==
Pennington was born on September 13, 1984, in Hartford, Connecticut. He graduated from Lakewood High School in 2003. His younger brother, Colin, is the 2003 national novice champion in men's singles.

In 2008, he began studying part-time at Baldwin-Wallace College while still competing.

== Career ==
=== Early years ===
Pennington began skating at age three. He was coached by Carol Heiss Jenkins from 1992 through 2003. For the majority of his career, he competed out of the Midwestern Section.

In 1995, Pennington won the national title on the Juvenile level. The next year, he won it on the Intermediate level. After failing to make it out of Sectionals in 1997 on the Novice level, he won the 1998 Novice national title. This earned him a trip to the Triglav Trophy, his first international event. He won gold on the novice level.

=== Junior career ===
Pennington was given his junior international debut in 1998 at an ISU Junior Grand Prix event in Sofia, Bulgaria, where he placed 4th, and then placed 9th in his second assignment, in China. Since the 1999 World Junior Championships were scheduled to be held before U.S. Nationals, he competed at a since-discontinued competition to determine the US team. He placed third and was sent to Junior Worlds, finishing 16th. At the 1999 Nationals, Pennington won the bronze medal on the junior level. In 1999, Pennington was given two Junior Grand Prix events and placed 5th at both. He then won his Sectionals and won the junior silver medal at Nationals. This earned him another trip to the Triglav Trophy, where he won gold on the junior level.

In 2000, Pennington won both his Junior Grand Prix events and placed 6th at the Junior Grand Prix Final. At Nationals, he won the gold medal on the Junior level, making him the first and so far only man to win Nationals on all of the following levels: Juvenile, Intermediate, Novice, and Junior. Pennington was originally scheduled to compete internationally on the Junior Grand Prix in the 2001–02 season. However, following the September 11, 2001 attacks, the USFSA withdrew all their skaters from the JGP. After placing 13th in his senior-level national debut, he won the junior gold medal at the Gardena Spring Trophy.

In the 2002–03 season, Pennington won the silver medal at both his events and then won the bronze medal at the Junior Grand Prix Final. He placed 6th at Nationals, earning himself another trip to the World Junior Championships. However, an injury led him to withdraw before the event began.

He was coached by Diana Ronayne from 2003 through 2005. He competed out of the Eastern Section in 2003, the only season he represented the Skating Club of New York in national competition. In 2003, Pennington won one Junior Grand Prix event and placed 6th at the other, missing qualification to the JGP Final. He withdrew from the 2004 Nationals due to injury.

=== 2004–2011 ===
For the 2004–05 season, Pennington was given his first senior international event, the Finlandia Trophy, where he placed 8th. His 16th-place finish at Nationals did not earn him an international assignment for the 2005–06 Olympic season.

He was coached by Janet Champion in 2006. His placement of 9th at the 2006 Nationals earned him a trip to the 2006 Nebelhorn Trophy, where he won the silver medal behind Tomáš Verner. Due to ISU rules, this medal did not earn Pennington a personal best score and did not put him on the list of seasonal best scores. That year at Nationals, Pennington placed 7th.

In the summer of 2007, Pennington moved to Fairfax, Virginia, to train under Audrey Weisiger. He changed his home club affiliation from the Broadmoor Skating Club to the Washington Skating Club and so competed out of the Eastern Section. Pennington was assigned to the 2007 Finlandia Trophy, where he won the silver medal, placing three points behind Verner and 16 points ahead of bronze medalist Kevin van der Perren. He won the silver medal at the Eastern Sectional Championships to qualify for the 2008 U.S. Championships, where he placed 11th.

Pennington returned to Heiss Jenkins in 2008, when he moved back to Cleveland. He practiced at the Cleveland Skating Club. He soon resigned from competing nationally, and instead, organized a series of shows called Skate Dance Dream. He now is a coach at the Cleveland Skating Club while continuing to coach, choreograph, and direct Skate Dance Dream and the Cleveland Skating Club annual ice show. Both are annual performances. He also coaches the Cleveland Skating Club theatre on ice team.

== Programs ==
Season	Short program	Free skating
2010–11	Chocolat by Rachel Portman choreo. by Parker Pennington	Freedom by Michael W. Smith choreo. by Parker Pennington
2009–10	Flamenco a Go-Go by Steve Stevens choreo. by Nikolai Morozov	William Tell Overture by Gioachino Rossini choreo. by David Wilson
2008–09	Flamenco a Go-Go by Steve Stevens choreo. by Nikolai Morozov	Violin Concerto by Pyotr I. Tchaikovsky
2007–08	Flamenco a Go-Go by Steve Stevens choreo. by Nikolai Morozov	Xotica by René Dupéré; Journey of Man by Benoît Jutras
2006–07	Prelude by Jesse Cook	Techno Mix - Plunkett & Macleane; Chess; Art on Ice by Edvin Marton
2005–06	The Firm	Incantations
2004–05	Carmen by Georges Bizet	Violin Concerto by Felix Mendelssohn
2003–04	Songs from "A Secret Garden"	Violin Concerto by Felix Mendelssohn
2002–03	Carmen by Georges Bizet	Piano Concerto No. 1 by Pyotr I. Tchaikovsky

== Competitive highlights ==
JGP: Junior Grand Prix

International
Event	98–99	99–00	00–01	01–02	02–03	03–04	04–05	05–06	06–07	07–08	08–09	09–10	10–11
Finlandia Trophy							8th			2nd			
Nebelhorn Trophy									2nd				
International: Junior or novice
Junior Worlds	16th				WD								
JGP Final			6th		3rd								
JGP Bulgaria	4th												
JGP China	9th												
JGP Czech Rep.			1st										
JGP Italy					2nd								
JGP Japan		5th											
JGP Netherlands		5th											
JGP Poland						1st							
JGP Slovakia						6th							
JGP Ukraine			1st										
JGP United States					2nd								
Gardena				1st J.									
Triglav Trophy		1st J.											
National
U.S. Champ.	3rd J.	2nd J.	1st J.	13th	6th	WD	16th	9th	7th	11th	8th	16th	17th
WD: Withdrew; Levels: N. = Novice; J. = Junior
