= Frank Carroll (figure skater) =

American figure skater (1938–2024)

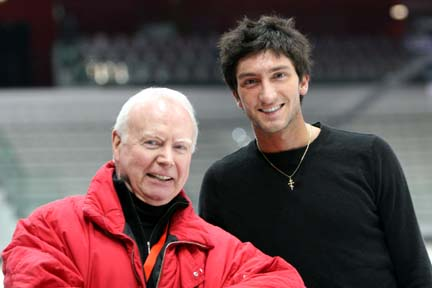
- Carroll with student Evan Lysacek at the 2007–2008 Grand Prix Final

Personal information
- Full name: Francis Michael Carroll
- Born: July 11, 1938 Worcester, Massachusetts, U.S.
- Died: June 9, 2024 (aged 85) Palm Springs, California, U.S.

Figure skating career
- Country: United States
- Discipline: Men's singles

Francis Michael Carroll (July 11, 1938 – June 9, 2024) was an American figure-skating coach and competitive skater. He had coached three skaters to win the World Figure Skating Championships: Linda Fratianne, Michelle Kwan and Evan Lysacek. Lysacek won the men's Olympic gold medal in 2010 at Vancouver.

Carroll had been inducted into the World Figure Skating Hall of Fame, the United States Figure Skating Hall of Fame and the Professional Skaters Association Coaches Hall of Fame, and was named the 1997 Olympic Coach of the Year.

== Biography and career ==
Born in 1938, Carroll was raised in Worcester, Massachusetts. When he was in his early teenage years, a skating rink opened in his neighborhood and he began skating, interested by the combination of artistry and athleticism. After graduating from the College of the Holy Cross in 1960 with a B.S. in sociology, Carroll moved to Winchester, Massachusetts and lived with his coach Maribel Vinson Owen and her daughters on weekends.

Carroll won the bronze medal on the junior level at the 1959 U.S. Championships. He won the silver medal on the junior level at the 1960 U.S. Championships. Carroll turned professional and toured with the Ice Follies for years, at the time of the Sabena Flight 548 crash that killed the entire U.S. team in 1961.

Carroll was accepted to law school at the University of San Francisco but chose to pursue acting. He appeared in the background of several beach films, including The Loved One.

Carroll become one of the most successful coaches in the U.S. His notable students include Linda Fratianne, Christopher Bowman, Michelle Kwan, Timothy Goebel, Gracie Gold, Denis Ten and Evan Lysacek. He was the head coach for the Toyota Sports Center in El Segundo, California. In 2011, he began coaching at a newly built rink in Cathedral City, California in order to be closer to his home in Palm Springs, California, one of his homes since the 1980s. Carroll resumed coaching at the Toyota Sports Center on June 1, 2013.

He died in Palm Springs, California on June 9, 2024, at the age of 85, from cancer.

== Results ==
Event	1958	1959	1960
U.S. Championships	8th J	3rd J.	3rd J.
J. = Junior level

== Coaching career ==
Carroll's students include:

- Robert Bradshaw: Coached to a silver medal at U.S. Nationals in 1973.
- Christopher Bowman. Coached to the U.S. national title, a world silver medal in 1989 and a world bronze medal in 1990.
- Nicole Bobek
- Tiffany Chin: Coached to two world bronze medals.
- Ellie Kawamura
- Mark Cockerell
- Silvia Fontana
- Linda Fratianne: Coached to two world championships and an Olympic silver medal in 1980.
- Timothy Goebel: Coached to the 2002 and 2003 world silver medals and the 2002 Olympic bronze medal. Carroll ended his coaching relationship with Goebel in November 2004 following the 2004 NHK Trophy.
- Gracie Gold: Coached from September 2013 to January 2017, including two national titles.
- Kristiene Gong
- Danielle Kahle
- Jennifer Kirk
- Carolina Kostner
- Karen Kwan
- Michelle Kwan: Coached her to four world championships and an Olympic silver medal in 1998. In the fall of 2001, Kwan and Carroll ended their coaching relationship. In interviews, Kwan said that she needed to "take responsibility" for her skating.
- Beatrisa Liang
- Evan Lysacek: Coached to a world championship in 2009 and an Olympic gold medal in 2010.
- Ye Bin Mok
- Daisuke Murakami
- Michael Kuluva
- Mirai Nagasu: Coached from May 2009 to April 2012.
- Angela Nikodinov
- Denis Ten: Coached to the 2013 world silver medal and 2014 Olympic bronze medal.

Carroll coached skaters to win the World Figure Skating Championships during the era of compulsory figures (Fratianne), after compulsory figures (Kwan) and under the ISU Judging System (Lysacek). He also coached Lysacek to an Olympic gold medal.

Carroll was inducted into the United States Figure Skating Hall of Fame in 1996. He was the first figure-skating coach to be named the Olympic Coach of the Year, which occurred in 1997.

On March 6, 2007, it was announced that Carroll had been elected to the World Figure Skating Hall of Fame. He was inducted on March 22, 2007 during the 2007 World Figure Skating Championships, between the original dance and the men's free skate.

On July 29, 2018, it was announced that Carroll would be retiring from coaching on August 3. Carroll planned to continue working with U.S. Figure Skating and the junior-development program.
