= Dino Quattrocecere =

South African figure skater (born 1973)

Personal information
- Full name: Dino Edgardo Quattrocecere
- Born: 13 February 1973 (age 53) Virginia, Free State
- Height: 186 cm (6.10 ft)

Figure skating career
- Country: South Africa
- Skating club: Southern Gauteng
- Retired: 2003

Dino Edgardo Quattrocecere (born 13 February 1973 in Virginia, Free State) is a South African figure skater. He competed at the 1994 Winter Olympics and placed 24th. He took a break from competitive skating, and then came back to win the South African national title from 2001 through 2003.

== Results ==
Event	1991–92	1992–93	1993–94	2000–01	2001–02	2002–03
Winter Olympic Games			24th			
World Championships	35th	36th	27th		37th	
Four Continents Championships					15th	
South African Championships				1st	1st	1st
Golden Spin of Zagreb					22nd	
