= Alla Beknazarova =

Ukrainian ice dancer

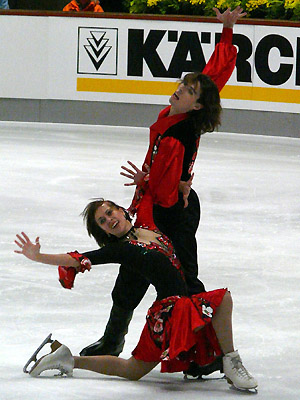
- Beknazarova and Zuev in 2007.

Personal information
- Native name: Алла Бекназарова
- Born: 28 August 1984 (age 42) Odesa, Ukrainian SSR, Soviet Union (now Ukraine)
- Height: 1.69 m (5 ft 6 1/2 in)

Figure skating career
- Country: Ukraine
- Began skating: 1989
- Retired: 2010
Medal record
Figure skating: Ice dancing
Representing Ukraine
Winter Universiade
Bronze medal – third place	2009 Harbin	Ice dancing

Alla Oleksandrivna Beknazarova (Note: Ukrainian: Алла Олександрівна Бекназарова, romanized: Alla Oleksandrivna Beknazarova) (born August 28, 1984) is a former competitive ice dancer. She is a three-time Ukrainian national champion — in 2001 with Yuriy Kocherzhenko and in 2007 and 2008 with Vladimir Zuev. Her best ISU Championship result, fourth, came at the 2001 World Junior Championships, competing with Kocherzhenko.

== Career ==
Beknazarova teamed up with Yuriy Kocherzhenko in late 1999 or early 2000. They were sent to the 2000 World Junior Championships, held in March in Oberstdorf, and finished 18th. In the 2000–01 season, Beknazarova/Kocherzhenko won gold at two JGP events and qualified for the ISU Junior Grand Prix Final, where they placed fourth. They also finished fourth at the 2001 World Junior Championships in Sofia. They won one senior international medal, bronze at the 2001 Karl Schäfer Memorial, and competed at two senior Grand Prix events and two senior ISU Championships. Their partnership ended in 2003.

Later in 2003, Beknazarova began skating with Vladimir Zuev. They won a gold medal at the 2005 Ondrej Nepela Memorial and four international bronze medals — at the 2007 Nebelhorn Trophy, 2009 Winter Universiade, and 2009 Finlandia Trophy. They competed at one World Junior Championships, one senior World Championships, and four European Championships. Their best result, 11th, came at the 2010 European Championships.

Beknazarova also skated with Sergei Verbillo.

== Programs ==
=== With Zuev ===
Season	Original dance	Free dance
2009–2010	Ukrainian folk: Cossack dance	Babylon (soundtrack)
2008–2009	Chicago (soundtrack)	Cirque du Soleil
2007–2008	Russian gypsy dance: Cruel Romance (Russian: Жестокий романс)	Fantasy on "Winter" from Four Seasons by Gary Moore; Music by Vanessa-Mae
2006–2007	Tango:	Flamenco
2005–2006	Cha Cha: Rhumba: Samba:	Argentine Tango by Gotan Project
2003–2004	Blues: Lover Lines; Boogie Woogie: Drink, Drank, Drunk	All That Jazz (from Chicago) by Ebb and Kander

=== With Kocherzhenko ===
Season	Original dance	Free dance
2002–2003	Waltz: Masquerade by Aram Khachaturian; March: Love of Three Oranges by Sergei Prokofiev; Waltz: Masquerade by Aram Khachaturian	Nuclear Train (from Edge of Darkness) by Michael Kamen
2001–2002	Tango: Hora Cero by Astor Piazzolla; Flamenco: Bolero by Maurice Ravel	Kismet by Bond
2000–2001	Charleston: Black Bottom by R. Henderson; Foxtrot: Petite Fleur by Sidney Bechet; Quickstep: When you Smile by V. Scalter	Avatora by Era

== Results ==
=== With Zuev ===
Results
International
Event	2003–04	2004–05	2005–06	2006–07	2007–08	2008–09	2009–10
Worlds			24th				
Europeans				13th	14th	13th	11th
Finlandia							3rd
Karl Schäfer			13th				
Nebelhorn					3rd		
Ondrej Nepela			1st				
Universiade		7th				3rd	
International: Junior
Junior Worlds	12th						
JGP Poland	4th						
National
Ukrainian Champ.	2nd J.		4th	1st	1st	2nd	2nd

=== With Kocherzhenko ===
Results
International
Event	1999–00	2000–01	2001–02	2002–03
World Champ.			25th	
European Champ.		23rd		
GP Bofrost Cup on Ice				9th
GP Skate Canada			11th	
Karl Schäfer Memorial			3rd	
Nebelhorn Trophy			5th	
Winter Universiade				4th
International: Junior
World Junior Champ.	18th	4th		
JGP Final		4th		
JGP France		1st		
JGP Ukraine		1st		
National
Ukrainian Champ.	3rd	1st	3rd	3rd
