= Marc-André Craig =

Canadian figure skater

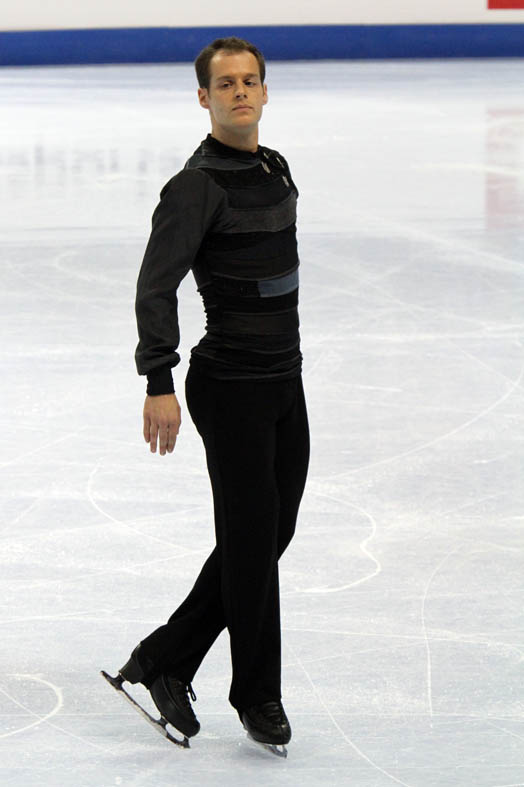

Personal information
- Born: October 21, 1982 (age 43) Sherbrooke, Quebec, Canada
- Height: 1.79 m (5 ft 10 in)

Figure skating career
- Country: Canada
- Coach: Josée Normand
- Skating club: Windsor Qc

Marc-André Craig (born October 21, 1982) is a Canadian former competitive figure skater. He is the 2004 Nebelhorn Trophy champion, 2004 Finlandia Trophy bronze medallist, and 2005 Golden Spin of Zagreb silver medallist. He placed fourth at the 2006 Four Continents Championships.

Craig has worked as a skating coach. He was born in Sherbrooke, Quebec.

== Programs ==
| Season | Short program | Free skating |
|---|---|---|
| 2006–2007 | Sway by Ruiz; Sway (remix) by Dean Martin | Who's That Creepin'? (from Jumpin' Jack) by Scotty Morris; The Rise and Fall of the Great Mondella by E. Nichols and M. Dorame; Summertime performed by Maynard Ferguson Sextet 1967 |
| 2005–2006 | Sway by Ruiz; Sway (remix) by Dean Martin | I Will Wait for You (Version Trio); I Will Wait for You (Version Big Band) by Michel Legrand |
| 2004–2005 | Theme from The Story of 'O'; Marder | Xotica: Journey to the Heart by René Dupéré; Art on Ice by Edvin Marton |

== Competitive highlights ==
GP: Grand Prix; JGP: Junior Grand Prix

International
| Event | 99–00 | 00–01 | 01–02 | 02–03 | 03–04 | 04–05 | 05–06 | 06–07 | 07–08 | 09–10 | 10–11 |
|---|---|---|---|---|---|---|---|---|---|---|---|
| Four Continents | | | | | | | 4th | | | | |
| GP Cup of China | | | | | | 10th | | | | | |
| GP NHK Trophy | | | | | | | | 11th | | | |
| GP Skate Canada | | | | | | | | 8th | | | |
| Finlandia Trophy | | | | | | 3rd | | | | | |
| Golden Spin | | | | | | | 2nd | | | | |
| Nebelhorn Trophy | | | | | | 1st | | | | | |
| Nepela Memorial | | | | | | | | | 11th | | |
International: Junior
| JGP Sweden | | | 5th | | | | | | | | |
| JGP Italy | | | 12th | | | | | | | | |
| JGP Germany | | 11th | | | | | | | | | |
| JGP Czech Rep. | 19th | | | | | | | | | | |
National
| Canadian Champ. | | 1st J | 19th | 11th | 11th | 8th | 6th | 9th | 13th | 10th | 9th |
