= Justin Pietersen =

South African figure skater (born 1986)

Personal information
- Full name: Justin Pietersen
- Born: 28 August 1986 (age 39)
- Height: 1.78 m (5 ft 10 in)

Figure skating career
- Country: South Africa
- Coach: Dantin Broodryk
- Skating club: Cape Peninsula SC

Justin Pietersen (born 28 August 1986 in Cape Town, South Africa) is a South African figure skater. He is the 2005 and 2007 South African national champion. His older sister Abigail Pietersen is also an elite senior-level figure skater.

== Competitive highlights ==
Event	2002–03	2003–04	2004–05	2005–06	2006–07	2007–08	2008–09	2009–10	2010–11
World Championships				20th QR	37th	38th	44th		
Four Continents Championships		20th	19th	16th	19th	16th	20th		
World Junior Championships			18th QR						
South African Championships	2nd J.	2nd J.	1st	3rd	1st	1st	1st	1st	1st
Nebelhorn Trophy								29th	
Afriskate			3rd						
Junior Grand Prix, Slovakia				16th					
Junior Grand Prix, Romania			17th						
Junior Grand Prix, Germany			21st						

- J = Junior level; QR = Qualifying Round
