= Vladimir Zuev (figure skater) =

Ukrainian ice dancer (born 1985)

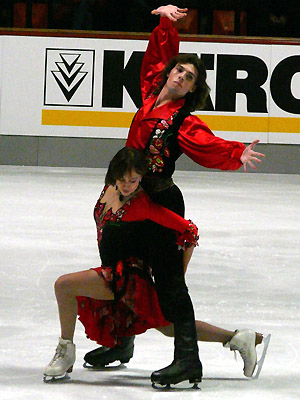
- Beknazarova and Zuev in 2007.

Personal information
- Born: 11 May 1985 (age 41) Kharkiv, Ukrainian SSR, Soviet Union
- Height: 1.80 m (5 ft 11 in)

Figure skating career
- Country: Ukraine
- Began skating: 1989
- Retired: 2010
Medal record
Figure skating: Ice dancing
Representing Ukraine
Winter Universiade
Bronze medal – third place	2009 Harbin	Ice dancing

Vladimir Sergeyevich Zuev (Russian: Владимир Сергеевич Зуев, also Volodymyr Serhiyovych Zuev, Ukrainian: Володимир Сергійович Зуєв, born 11 May 1985) is a Ukrainian former competitive ice dancer. With Alla Beknazarova, he is a two-time Ukrainian national champion.

== Career ==
Zuev skated with Oksana Dejneka early in his career.

In 2003, Zuev began competing with Alla Beknazarova. They won a gold medal at the 2005 Ondrej Nepela Memorial and four international bronze medals — at the 2007 Nebelhorn Trophy, 2009 Winter Universiade, and 2009 Finlandia Trophy. They competed at one World Junior Championships, one senior World Championships, and four European Championships. Their best result, 11th, came at the 2010 European Championships.

== Programs ==
(with Beknazarova)

Season	Original dance	Free dance
2009–2010	Ukrainian folk: Cossack dance	Babylon (soundtrack)
2008–2009	Chicago (soundtrack)	Cirque du Soleil
2007–2008	Russian gypsy dance: Cruel Romance (Russian: Жестокий романс)	Fantasy on "Winter" from Four Seasons by Gary Moore; Music by Vanessa-Mae
2006–2007	Tango:	Flamenco
2005–2006	Cha Cha: Rhumba: Samba:	Argentine Tango by Gotan Project
2003–2004	Blues: Lover Lines; Boogie Woogie: Drink, Drank, Drunk	All That Jazz (from Chicago) by Ebb and Kander

== Results ==
(with Beknazarova)

Results
International
Event	2003–04	2004–05	2005–06	2006–07	2007–08	2008–09	2009–10
Worlds			24th				
Europeans				13th	14th	13th	11th
Finlandia							3rd
Karl Schäfer			13th				
Nebelhorn					3rd		
Ondrej Nepela			1st				
Universiade		7th				3rd	
International: Junior
Junior Worlds	12th						
JGP Poland	4th						
National
Ukrainian Champ.	2nd J.		4th	1st	1st	2nd	2nd
