= Michaela du Toit =

South African figure skater and actress

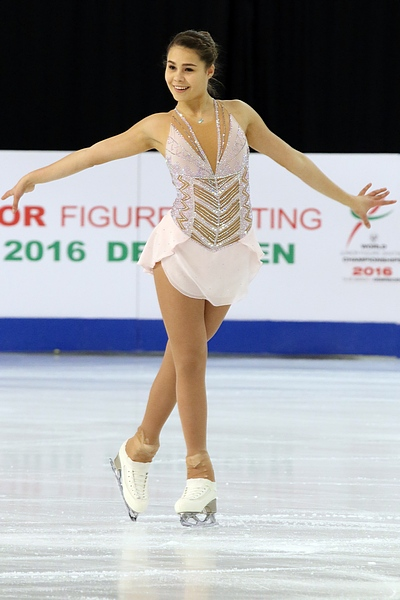
- du Toit at the 2016 World Junior Championships.

Personal information
- Born: January 10, 2000 (age 26) Poole, England, United Kingdom
- Height: 174 cm (5 ft 9 in)

Figure skating career
- Country: South Africa
- Coach: Brian Orser
- Began skating: 2008

Michaela du Toit (born January 10, 2000) is a figure skater representing South Africa and an actress. She is the 2015 and 2017 South African National Champion. She starred in the Family Channel’s 2016 film Ice Girls alongside two-time Olympic silver medalist Elvis Stojko.

== Personal life ==
Michaela du Toit was born on January 10, 2000, in Poole, England, but she grew up in Toronto, Canada. She started playing hockey at the age of six, but she decided to switch to figure skating, and she originally represented Canada before switching to South Africa, which is where her family is originally from.

In 2016, she made her acting debut playing the character Maddie in the TV movie Ice Girl.

== Skating career ==
du Toit began competing in the ISU Junior Grand Prix (JGP) in the 2013–14 season. She was assigned to the JGP Mexico where she finished 16th. She also won the 2013 junior South African national title. She competed at her first Junior World Championships in 2014 where she finished 37th in the short program and did not advance to the free skate. She then received two assignments in the 2014–15 ISU Junior Grand Prix. She finished 15th in the JGP Japan and 12th in the JGP Germany. She won her second junior South African national title in 2014. At the 2015 Junior World Championships, she finished 37th again. She won her first senior South African National Championships in 2015.

She received two assignments in the 2015–16 ISU Junior Grand Prix. She finished 18th in the JGP Poland and 13th in the JGP Spain. She competed at the 2016 Four Continents Championships where she finished 18th. She finished 31st at the 2016 Junior World Championships.

du Toit competed at the 2016 Autumn Classic International where she finished 15th. She won her second senior national title in 2017. At the 2017 Four Continents Championships, she finished 23rd in the short program but then withdrew before the free skate.

== Programs ==
Season	Short program	Free skating
2016–2017	La Vie en rose by Édith Piaf performed by Louis Armstrong; I Love Paris In the Spring by Vanessa Paradis choreo. by Shae-Lynn Bourne	Pas de Deux (from The Nutcracker) by Pyotr Ilyich Tchaikovsky choreo. by Joey Russell, Jeffrey Buttle
2015–2016	La Vie en rose by Édith Piaf performed by Louis Armstrong; I Love Paris In the Spring by Vanessa Paradis choreo. by Shae-Lynn Bourne	Take Five; Unsquare Dance by Dave Brubeck choreo. by Shae-Lynn Bourne; Don Quixote by Ludwig Minkus choreo. by David Wilson
2014–2015	Gaîté Parisienne by Jacques Offenbach choreo. by David Wilson	Don Quixote by Ludwig Minkus choreo. by David Wilson
2013–2014	Gaîté Parisienne by Jacques Offenbach choreo. by David Wilson; Carmen by Georges Bizet choreo. by David Wilson	The Nutcracker by Pyotr Ilyich Tchaikovsky choreo. by Mary Larmer

== Competitive highlights ==
GP: Grand Prix; JGP: Junior Grand Prix

International
Event	13–14	14–15	15–16	16–17
Four Continents			18th	WD
FBMA Trophy				10th
Golden Bear				17th
Open d'Andorra			2nd	3rd
Reykjavik			3rd	
International: Junior
Junior Worlds	37th	37th	31st	
JGP Germany		12th		
JGP Japan		15th		
JGP Mexico	16th			
JGP Poland			18th	
Bavarian Open	3rd	11th		
NRW Trophy	12th			
Skate Helena	2nd			
National
South African	1st J.	1st		1st
WD = Withdraw; J. = Junior level
