= Diane Towler =

English ice dancer

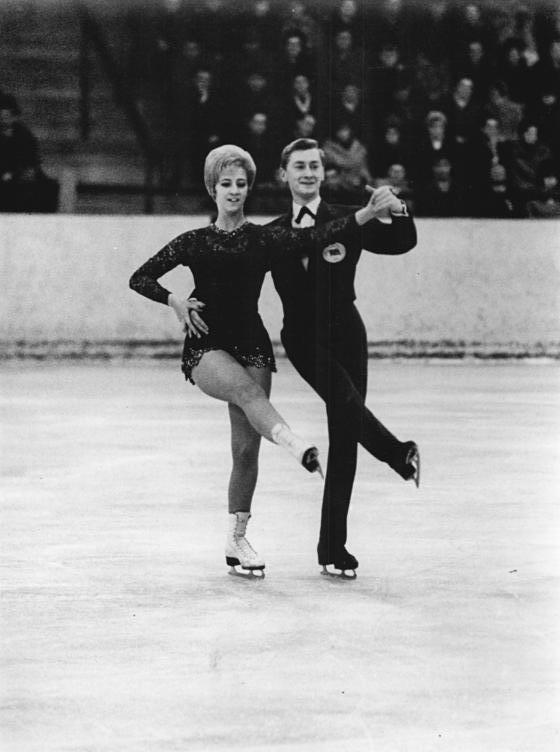
Towler and Ford in 1966

Diane Margaret Towler MBE married Green, (born 16 December 1946) is an English former ice dancer and currently a figure skating coach. She is a four-time (1966–1969) World and European champion with skating partner Bernard Ford.

== Personal life ==
Diane Towler-Green was born 16 December 1946 in Kensington, London. She is the mother of ice dancers Candice Towler-Green and Phillipa Towler-Green, and the aunt of Mark Bosley.

== Career ==
Towler was partnered with Bernard Ford by the duo's coach, Gladys Hogg. The two debuted at the World Championships in 1964, finishing 13th. In 1965, they finished just off the podium in 4th. Towler/Ford won gold at the 1966 European Championships and went on to win their first World title. They would win the World and European titles for four consecutive seasons.

At the 1968 Winter Olympics, Towler/Ford skated in a demonstration event for ice dancing, winning the gold medal. Ice dancing became an official part of the Winter Olympics in 1976.

Towler, alongside Ford, was appointed of Member of the Order of the British Empire (MBE) by Queen Elizabeth II in the 1969 Birthday Honours for services to ice dancing, and both were inducted into the World Figure skating Hall of Fame in Colorado Springs in 1993. Their best-known program was skated to the theme from Zorba the Greek. After retiring from amateur competition, they performed in ice shows until Ford moved to Canada.

Towler became a figure skating coach. Her ice dancing students include:

- Janet Sawbridge / Peter Dalby (1972 Europeans bronze medalists)
- Candice Towler-Green / James Phillipson
- Phillipa Towler-Green / Phillip Poole, both British Junior champions and world competitors
- Debbie Burne / Mark Bosley, British junior champions and 5th at Junior Worlds
- Elizabeth Coates / Alan Abretti who competed at the World and European Championships
- Ashlie Slatter / Atl Ongay-Pérez, youngest British National Junior silver medalists 2022, 2023/24 British Junior national Champions, Junior Grand Prix 2022 competitors, and youngest Junior Worlds 2023 competitors to qualify and subsequently place 18th.

== Results ==
(with Ford)

Event	63–64	64–65	65–66	66–67	67–68	68–69
World Championships	13th	4th	1st	1st	1st	1st
European Championships		4th	1st	1st	1st	1st
British Nationals		3rd	1st	1st	1st	1st
