= Candice Towler-Green =

English ice dancer

Personal information
- Full name: Candice Towler-Green
- Born: 11 May 1984 (age 42) Lambeth, London, England

Figure skating career
- Country: United Kingdom
- Partner: James Phillipson
- Skating club: Streatham

Candice Towler-Green (born 11 May 1984 in Lambeth, London) is an English ice dancer. With partner James Phillipson, she is the 2001 and 2002 British junior national champion. They placed 22nd at the 2002 World Junior Championships and 19th at the 2003 Junior Worlds. They placed 9th at the 2003 European Youth Olympic Festival. They placed 5th at the 2004 Nebelhorn Trophy.

She is the twin sister of Phillipa Towler-Green and the daughter of Diane Towler, who also coached her.
