= Syriana (soundtrack) =

2005 soundtrack album by Alexandre Desplat

Syriana (Original Motion Picture Soundtrack)

Soundtrack album by Alexandre Desplat
- Released: December 6, 2005
- Recorded: 2005
- Studio: Warner Bros. Eastwood Scoring Stage; Sony Scoring Stage
- Genre: Soundtrack
- Length: 45:47
- Label: RCA Victor

Alexandre Desplat chronology
Casanova (2005)	Syriana (Original Motion Picture Soundtrack) (2005)	The Alibi (2006)

Syriana (Original Motion Picture Soundtrack) is the original soundtrack composed by Alexandre Desplat for the 2005 film Syriana. Desplat's score was nominated for the Golden Globe Award for Best Original Score.

== Track listing ==
No.	Title	Length
1.	"Syriana"	2:28
2.	"Driving in Geneva"	2:45
3.	"Fields of Oil"	2:10
4.	"The Commute"	4:22
5.	"Beirut Taxi"	3:46
6.	"Something Really Cool"	1:38
7.	"Syriana (Piano Solo)"	3:18
8.	"I'll Walk Around"	2:37
9.	"Access Denied"	2:51
10.	"Electricity"	3:59
11.	"Falcons"	0:57
12.	"The Abduction"	4:17
13.	"Tortured"	2:17
14.	"Take the Target Out"	1:23
15.	"Truce"	1:42
16.	"Mirage"	1:39
17.	"Fathers and Sons"	3:38
Total length:		45:47
