= Danielle Kahle =

American figure skater

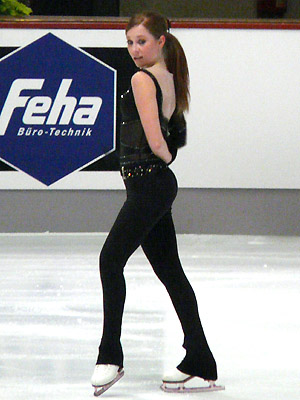
- Kahle in 2007

Personal information
- Other names: Dani
- Born: April 9, 1989 (age 37) Cedar Rapids, Iowa, U.S.
- Home town: Simi Valley, California, U.S.
- Height: 5 ft 4 in (163 cm)

Figure skating career
- Country: United States
- Discipline: Women's singles
- Coach: Frank Carroll
- Skating club: All Year FSC

Danielle "Dani" Kahle (born April 9, 1989) is an American former competitive figure skater. She won four medals on the ISU Junior Grand Prix series, including gold in Croatia in 2003, and finished 11th at the 2004 World Junior Championships. She won one senior international medal, silver, at the 2006 Karl Schäfer Memorial.

== Career ==
Kahle first stepped onto the ice at age three but was removed from the class for not listening to the instructor. She returned to skating two years later.

After winning the novice national title in 2002, Kahle won bronze on the junior level at the 2003 U.S. Championships. She won senior gold titles twice at the Pacific Coast Sectionals (2006, 2007) and twice at the Southwest Pacific Regionals (2006, 2011). Kahle qualified to compete on the senior level at the U.S. Championships six times, from 2004 to 2011. Her highest finish was sixth in 2007.

Kahle competed for four seasons on the ISU Junior Grand Prix, winning four medals—gold at the 2003 Croatia Cup, two silver, and one bronze. She qualified twice for the JGP Final, finishing 6th and 9th. She made her senior international debut at the 2006 Karl Schäfer Memorial and won the silver medal.

In 2010, she sustained a lower back fracture in a car accident.

Kahle trained in El Segundo, California and Simi Valley, California, coached by Frank Carroll and Cindy Bortz-Gould.

Kahle made skating sequences for the Disney feature film, Ice Princess in 2004, and was one of four skaters featured on the 2006 TLC show, Ice Diaries. She was also in the movie Ice Dreams. She coaches at Iceoplex Arena in Simi Valley and once assisted and coached an annual ice show, the Lion King.

== Personal life ==
Kahle has three brothers and a younger sister, Savannah. As of 2011, she is attending Cal State Northridge.

== Programs ==
Season	Short program	Free skating	Exhibition
2010–11	Kill Bill Vol. 2	La Strada by Nino Rota	
2007–08	Kill Bill Vol. 1	Piano Concerto No. 2 in C minor by Sergei Rachmaninoff	
2006–07	Kill Bill Vol. 1	Beauty and the Beast	
2005–06	Romeo and Juliet	Beauty and the Beast	
2004–05	"Hernando's Hideaway" by Richard Adler and Jerry Ross	Mack and Mabel by Jerry Herman	
2003–04	"Hot Honey Rag" (from Chicago) by John Kander	Much Ado About Nothing; Sense and Sensibility by Patrick Doyle; Charlie Chaplin medley	"All That Jazz" (from Chicago) by John Kander

== Competitive highlights ==
Results
International
Event	2002–03	2003–04	2004–05	2005–06	2006–07	2007–08	2008–09	2009–10	2010–11	2011–12
Finlandia							11th			
Karl Schäfer					2nd					
Nebelhorn						13th				
International: Junior
Junior Worlds		11th								
JGP Final		6th	9th							
JGP Croatia		1st								
JGP Estonia				5th						
JGP Germany			2nd							
JGP Mexico		2nd								
JGP USA	5th		3rd							
National
U.S. Champ.	3rd J.	10th	11th	12th	6th	12th			18th	
