= Raymond Towler =

Ray Towler (born Raymond Towler June 16, 1957) is an American musician (guitarist, keyboardist and trumpeter) and artist (painter). On September 18, 1981, when he was 24, Towler was falsely convicted of rape, kidnapping and felonious assault in Cuyahoga County, Ohio. The charges were vacated on May 5, 2010 after Towler had spent over 29 years of his life in prison for a crime he did not commit.

== Arrest and conviction ==
On May 24, 1981, a 12-year-old boy and 11-year-old girl were coaxed into a wooded area in the Rocky River Reservation, a Cleveland, Ohio park. The boy was assaulted and the girl raped. Three weeks after the incident, Raymond Towler was identified as matching the description of the suspect when he was stopped by a Park Ranger during a routine traffic stop. Towler was convicted of rape, kidnapping, and felonious assault on September 18, 1981. He was sentenced to 12 years to life in prison for rape with additional consecutive sentences of 7 to 25 years and 5 to 25 years.

== Children's CD incident ==
In 2006 Towler assisted in the production of State (of Ohio) sponsored Children's CD in which inmates performed lullabies, sing-a-longs and parenting tips. Although Towler was an accomplished musician, he was not permitted to perform on the album because of his convictions of sex offenses and crimes against children. Despite being banned from performing on the album, Towler was credited as technical adviser and consultant to the artists. Due to the nature of Towler's convictions, his involvement with the production led to public outcry from organizations including the Ohio Resource Network for Safe and Drug-Free Schools and Communities.

== Columbus dispatch test of convictions investigation ==
In January 2008, The Columbus Dispatch completed a year-long investigation of 313 inmates who had requested DNA evidence testing since 2003. Of the 313 only 14 had received the requested testing. Although Ohio State law requires a reason for denial of testing, over half of the denials did not include a reason; 53 requests were simply ignored. The Dispatch chose to highlight Towler as one of 30 inmates in their Test of Convictions investigation.

== DNA testing ==
In 2004 a judge ordered DNA testing. When prosecutors arranged for a pubic hair recovered from the victim to be sent to Reliagene, a private lab in New Orleans for testing, the envelope arrived empty. A month later prosecutors mailed material from under the victim's fingernails to the lab. Reliagene reported that that package also arrived empty and contained no evidence. On February 5, 2008, Towler requested additional DNA testing. On November 5, 2008, results from the DNA test of the semen stained underwear showed partial genetic profiles of two males, neither consistent with Towler. Although the DNA was not a match for Towler, the prosecutor called the results inconclusive, and noted that the presence of DNA from two people on the underwear (when it was accepted that there was only one assailant) raised questions as to how the evidence had been handled in the years since it was collected and the validity of the DNA results. On May 4, 2010, results of DNA testing of the semen and skin cells individually proved Towler's innocence. The technology which allowed the samples to be tested individually was not provided by the testing in 2008.

== Release ==
On May 5, 2010, the convictions of rape, kidnapping and felonious assault were vacated by Cuyahoga County Common Pleas Court Judge Eileen A. Gallagher and Towler was released from Grafton Correctional Institution.

== Restitution ==
Under Ohio state law, Towler is entitled to receive $40,330 for every year of wrongful imprisonment for a total of $1,088,910. This does not include any lost wages or damages Towler may receive by filing charges against the Ohio Department of Corrections.

== See also ==
- List of wrongful convictions in the United States
