= Ice Diaries =

- Genre: Documentary
- Directed by: Wei Ling Chang; Anna Park
- Country of origin: United States
- Original language: English
- No. of seasons: 1
- No. of episodes: 6

Production
- Running time: 60 minutes

Original release
- Network: TLC
- Release: January 6 – February 20, 2006

Ice Diaries is a documentary TV series on the TLC network that follows four up-and-coming American figure skaters through the 2005/2006 Olympic season as each tries to make the 2006 Olympic team. The four skaters are Beatrisa "Bebe" Liang, Alissa Czisny, Danielle Kahle, and Sandra Rucker. Rucker did not make it out of Regionals, the first step for qualifying for the United States Figure Skating Championships. Kahle won both her Regionals and Sectionals and placed twelfth at Nationals. Czisny placed second at Skate America and won Skate Canada International, but finish in last place at the Grand Prix Final and had two bad skates at Nationals and finished seventh. Liang came in fourth at Skate America and finished fifth at Nationals, the highest placement of the four skaters. After Rucker's season ended before the series did, the show profiled Jennifer Kirk and her decision to quit competitive skating the year before an Olympic year. None of the profiled skaters made the Olympic team. Created by co-executive producer Scott Williams and Dan Marinelli, Ice Diaries was produced by IMG Media in association with Turtle Island Productions.

== Factual errors ==
- The series repeatedly refers to Rucker as the defending champion. This is not the case. Rucker was the 2005 Champion on the junior level. Had she been the defending senior champion, she would not have had to qualify for the championships.
- The series also glosses over competitions that were not on the Grand Prix or national qualifying competitions. Liang, for example, began her season at the Nebelhorn Trophy, not Skate America.

== See also ==
- 2006 U.S. Figure Skating Championships
