= Edwin Towler =

English footballer

Personal information
- Position: Goalkeeper

Senior career*
Years	Team	Apps	(Gls)
1902–1904	Burnley	23	(0)
Total		23	(0)
- * Club domestic league appearances and goals

Edwin Towler was an English professional footballer who played as a goalkeeper. He played 23 matches in the Football League Second Division for Burnley between 1902 and 1904.
