= Martinová =

Municipality of Slovakia

Martinová Nemesmartonfala
- Municipality
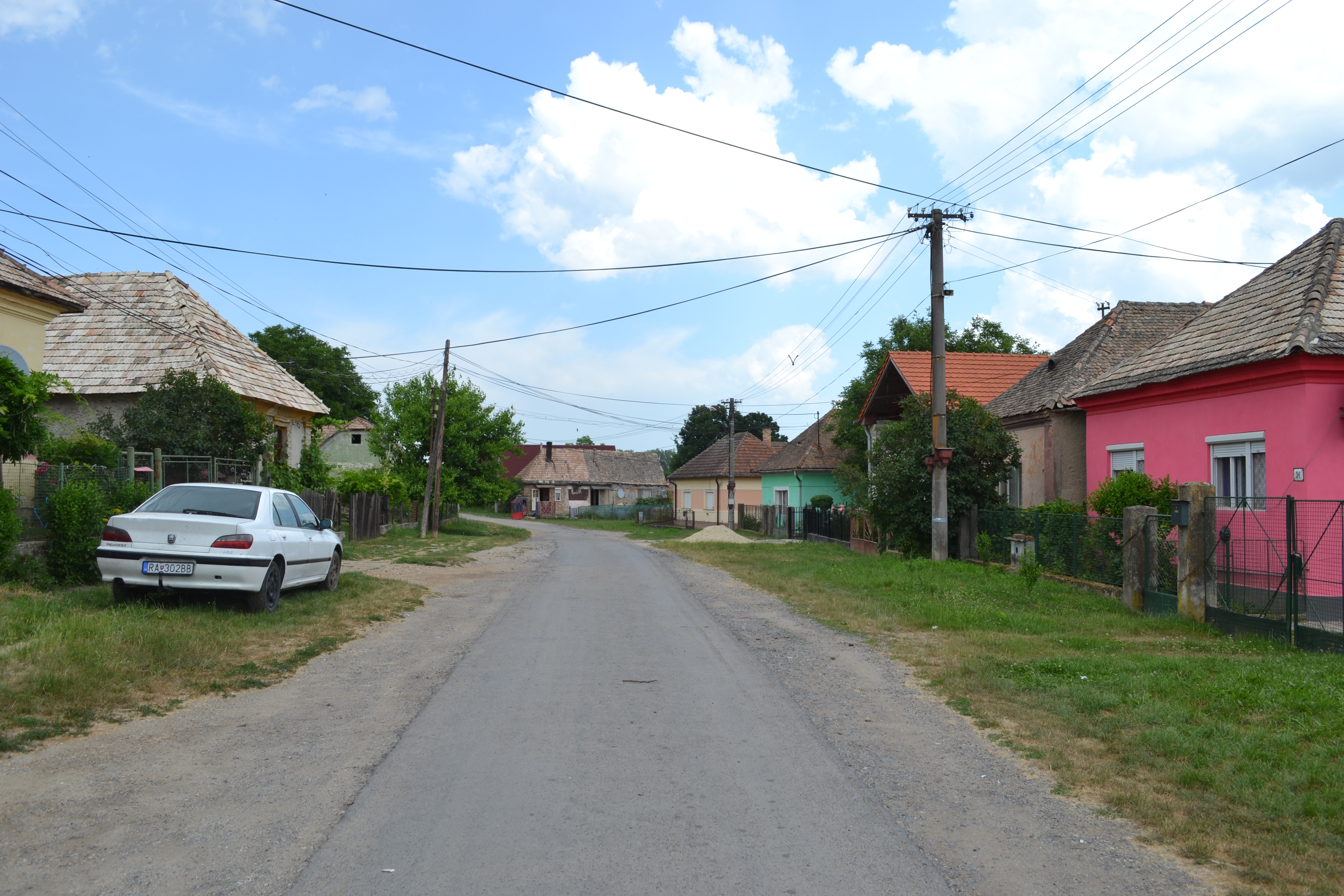

- Location of Martinová in the Banská Bystrica Region Location of Martinová in Slovakia
- Coordinates: 48.30°N 20.17°E
- Country: Slovakia
- Region: Banská Bystrica Region
- District: Rimavská Sobota District
- First mentioned: 1427

Area
  - Total: 3.77 km^{2} (1.46 sq mi)
- Elevation: 180 m (590 ft)

Population (2025)
  - Total: 204
- Time zone: UTC+1 (CET)
  - Summer (DST): UTC+2 (CEST)
- Postal code: 980 41
- Area code: +421 47
- Vehicle registration plate (until 2022): RS
- Website: martinova.sk

Martinová (Hungarian: Nemesmartonfala) is a village and municipality in the Rimavská Sobota District of the Banská Bystrica Region of southern Slovakia

== Geography ==
The municipality lies at an altitude of 180 metres (590 ft) and covers an area of 3.77 km^{2} (1.46 sq mi) (2025).

== Population ==
Population statistic (10 years)
Year	1995	2005	2015	2025
Count	191	196	200	204
Difference		+2.61%	+2.04%	+2%

Population statistic
Year	2024	2025
Count	205	204
Difference		−0.48%

It has a population of 204 people (31 December 2025).

=== Ethnicity ===
Census 2021 (1+ %)
Ethnicity	Number	Fraction
Hungarian	129	57.84%
Romani	110	49.32%
Slovak	35	15.69%
Not found out	13	5.82%
Total	223	

In year 2021 was 223 people by ethnicity 129 as Hungarian, 110 as Romani, 35 as Slovak, 13 as Not found out, 2 as Czech and 1 as Russian.

Note on population: The difference values of population numbers in the table "Population statistic" and in the sections "Ethnicity" & "Religion" is caused by the use of various statistical methods.

=== Religion ===
Census 2021 (1+ %)
Religion	Number	Fraction
Roman Catholic Church	110	49.33%
None	56	25.11%
Calvinist Church	34	15.25%
Not found out	12	5.38%
Evangelical Church	6	2.69%
Greek Catholic Church	3	1.35%
Total	223	

In year 2021 was 223 people by religion 110 from Roman Catholic Church, 56 from None, 34 from Calvinist Church, 12 from Not found out, 6 from Evangelical Church, 3 from Greek Catholic Church and 2 from Jehovah's Witnesses.
