= Gareth Echardt =

Personal information
- Born: 16 April 1981 (age 45)
- Height: 1.76 m (5 ft 9 1/2 in)

Figure skating career
- Country: South Africa
- Coach: Dantin Broodryk
- Skating club: Western Province Club
- Began skating: 1993
- Retired: 2007

Gareth Echardt (born 16 April 1981 in Cape Town) is a South African former competitive figure skater. He is a six-time South African national silver medalist (2001, 2003, 2005–2007) and competed in the final segment at four Four Continents Championships; his highest placement, 14th, came in 2005.

== Programs ==
Season	Short program	Free skating
2005–2006	Nothing Else Matters by Metallica	Van Helsing by Alan Silvestri
2004–2005	La Strada by Nino Rota	Concierto de Aranjuez by Joaquín Rodrigo
2003–2004	King of Swing by Big Bad Voodoo Daddy	Aranjuez Mon Amour by Joaquín Rodrigo performed by the Golden Symphonic Orchestra
2001–2002	The Industrial (Burn the Floor) by Stephen Brocker performed by the London Musicians Orchestra	Schindler's List by John Williams
2000–2001	Take Five by Dave Brubeck	Lawrence of Arabia by Maurice Jarre performed by the London Philharmonic Orchestra

== Competitive highlights ==
International
Event	00–01	01–02	02–03	03–04	04–05	05–06	06–07
Worlds	37th				42nd		
Four Continents		19th		16th	14th	23rd	
Nebelhorn Trophy					19th	22nd	
Schäfer Memorial						15th	
Afriskate						2nd	
National
South Africa	2nd		2nd		2nd	2nd	2nd
