= Jenna-Anne Buys =

South African figure skater

Personal information
- Born: 22 November 1985 (age 40) Johannesburg, South Africa
- Height: 1.70 m (5 ft 7 in)

Figure skating career
- Country: South Africa
- Coach: Lisa Stigant
- Skating club: Central Gauteng
- Retired: 2006

Jenna-Anne Buys (born 22 November 1985 in Johannesburg) is a South African former competitive figure skater. She is a three-time South African national champion and qualified to the free skate at three Four Continents Championships.

== Programs ==
Season	Short program	Free skating
2005–2006	Sozo by Kitarō	The Patriot by John Williams
2004–2005	Senorita by Bond	Pearl Harbor by Hans Zimmer
2003–2004	Spirit of the Dance	Pearl Harbor by Hans Zimmer
2002–2003	Rebel Heart; Paddy McCarthy by The Corrs	Palladio by Karl Jenkins; Music by Mighty Joe Young; Tango Tanguero
2001–2002	Victory by Bond	Sapphire by Keiko Matsui; Mighty Joe Young

== Results ==
International
Event	01–02	02–03	03–04	04–05	05–06	06–07
World Champ.			35th		41st	
Four Continents Champ.	16th	21st	23rd	20th		
Schäfer Memorial					16th	
Nebelhorn Trophy				14th	18th	
International: Junior
World Junior Champ.	27th	34th				
JGP Sweden	18th					
National
South African Champ.	2nd	2nd	1st	2nd	1st	1st
