= Arina Martynova =

Russian figure skater

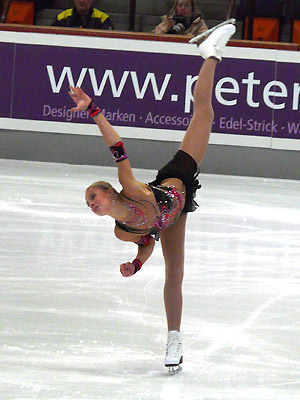
- Martynova in 2007.

Personal information
- Full name: Arina Valeryevna Martynova
- Born: 27 February 1990 (age 36) Moscow, Russian SFSR, Soviet Union
- Height: 1.65 m (5 ft 5 in)

Figure skating career
- Country: Russia
- Skating club: SC Moskvitch
- Began skating: 1994
- Retired: 2009

Arina Valeryevna Martynova (Russian: Арина Валерьевна Мартынова, born 27 February 1990 in Moscow) is a Russian figure skater. She is the 2006 Nebelhorn Trophy silver medalist and competed at four ISU Championships. She was coached by Svetlana Sokolovskaya from 2004 to 2006, by Marina Kudriavtseva from 2006 to 2008, and by Viktoria Volchkova in the 2008–09 season.

== Programs ==
Season	Short program	Free skating
2008–09	The Gadfly by Dmitri Shostakovich	Soltan in Love; Abu Da II; Oasis
2007–08	The Gadfly by Dmitri Shostakovich; Otonal by Raúl Di Blasio	Soltan in Love; Abu Da II; Oasis
2006–07	Otonal by Raúl Di Blasio	Don Quixote by Ludwig Minkus
2005–06	Moonlight Sonata by Ludwig van Beethoven	Medley by Vanessa-Mae; Blues

== Competitive highlights ==
GP: Grand Prix; JGP: Junior Grand Prix

International
Event	03–04	04–05	05–06	06–07	07–08	08–09
World Champ.			19th	16th		
GP Cup of China					11th	
GP Cup of Russia				7th	12th	
GP NHK Trophy				7th		
Finlandia Trophy					8th	
Nebelhorn Trophy				2nd	9th	
Universiade						15th
International: Junior
World Junior Champ.			12th	13th		
JGP Andorra			4th			
JGP Poland			6th			
JGP Romania		6th				
JGP Serbia		4th				
National
Russian Champ.	9th	8th	6th	4th	WD	7th
Russian Jr. Champ.			1st	1st		
WD = Withdrew
