= Phillip Poole =

English ice dancer and ice dance coach

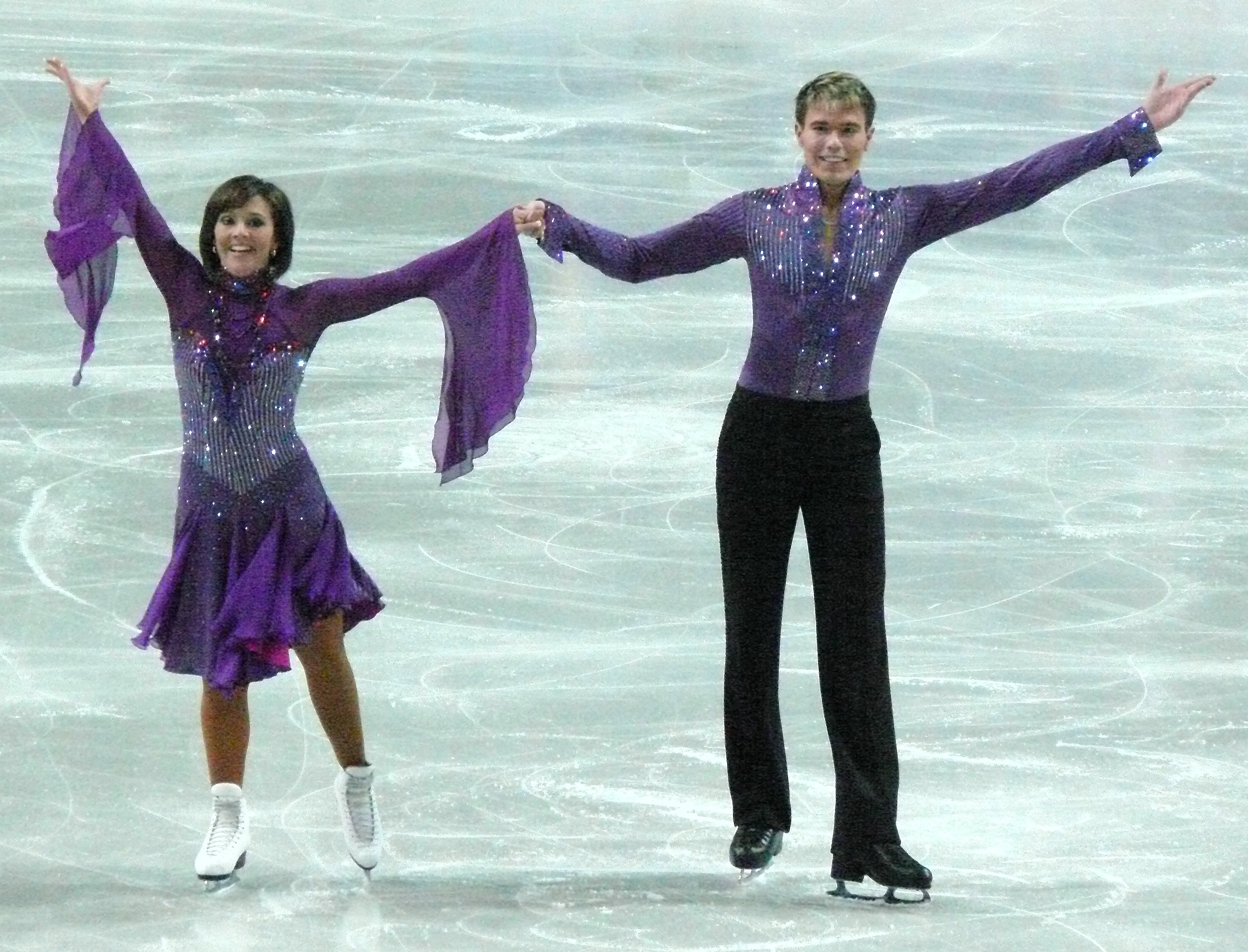
- Phillip Poole & Phillipa Towler-Green at the European Championships 2007

Personal information
- Full name: Phillip Christopher Poole
- Born: 24 June 1981 (age 45) Windsor, Berkshire, England
- Home town: Windsor, Berkshire
- Height: 1.83 m (6 ft 0 in)

Figure skating career
- Country: Great Britain
- Partner: Phillipa Towler-Green; Charlotte Clements
- Coach: Diane Towler
- Skating club: Streatham Club, London
- Retired: December 2009

Phillip Poole (born 24 June 1981 in Windsor) is a multi-medal winning English ice dancer and ice dance coach.

== Competitive career ==
Phillip Poole began his skating career in 1986 at the age of five, and he competed in his first British Championships in 1991. In the 1990s, he held the title of British champion in novice-level single skating. He was also champion in intermediate-level solo ice dancing before beginning his couples ice dance career.

Along with Charlotte Clements, Poole was the 2002 British bronze medalist on the senior level. The following year he teamed up with Phillipa Towler-Green and was coached by former World Champion Diane Towler. Poole and Towler-Green were the 2005–2008 British silver medalists and the 2004 Nebelhorn Trophy bronze medalists.

Poole and Towler-Green represented Great Britain at the European Figure Skating Championships in 2006, 2007 and 2008. In March 2009, they competed at the World Figure Skating Championships in Los Angeles, representing Great Britain alongside Sinead Kerr and John Kerr.

=== Results ===
(with Phillipa Towler-Green)

Results
Event	2004–05	2005–06	2006–07	2007–08	2008–09	2009–10
World Championships					23rd	
European Championships		20th	23rd	18th		
Finlandia Trophy						6th
Nebelhorn Trophy	3rd	7th	9th	12th	9th	
Ondrej Nepela Memorial					5th	
British Championships	3rd	2nd	2nd	2nd	2nd	

(with Charlotte Clements)

Competition	Level	Year	Placement
British Championships	Senior	2002	3rd

== Other work ==
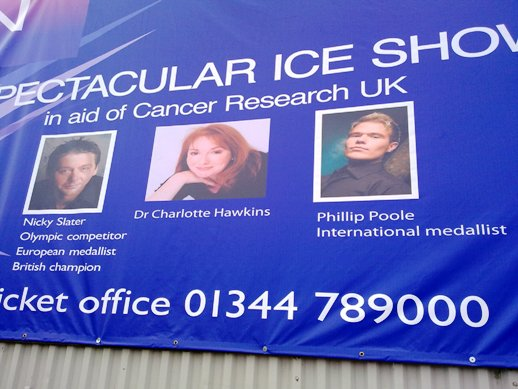
Detail of Inspiration on Ice promotional banner

In 1998, Poole featured in The Young Ice Skater and Dorling-Kindersley's Superguides: Ice Skating (2000) books, where he demonstrated moves and positions on the ice.

In 2006, Poole and Towler-Green starred in Somerset House's New Year's Eve extravaganza, televised live on BBC One, alongside stars including Jamelia, Natasha Kaplinsky and Sophie Ellis-Bextor.

During series two of ITV's Dancing on Ice reality TV show in 2007, Poole and Towler-Green were the ice dancing couple who appeared in the DFS promotional sting in each edition.

In October 2010, Poole starred in the charity gala event Inspiration on Ice where he performed ice dance routines with Dr Charlotte Hawkins, a Harley Street consultant in aid of Cancer Research UK, following an intensive nine-month training program to take her from beginner level through to a capable ice dancer. The event was hosted by Nicky Slater and Christopher Biggins, and also featured Poole's own ice dancers and other members of Bracknell Ice Skating Club.

Phillip played the role of Prince Charming in the 2010 Bracknell ice pantomime, Cinderella on Ice, and between 2010 and 2011 he was the stand-in male pro skater for series 6 of Dancing on Ice with his celebrity partner, Faye Tozer, from Steps.
