= Phillipa Towler-Green =

English figure skater

Phillipa Mary Towler-Green
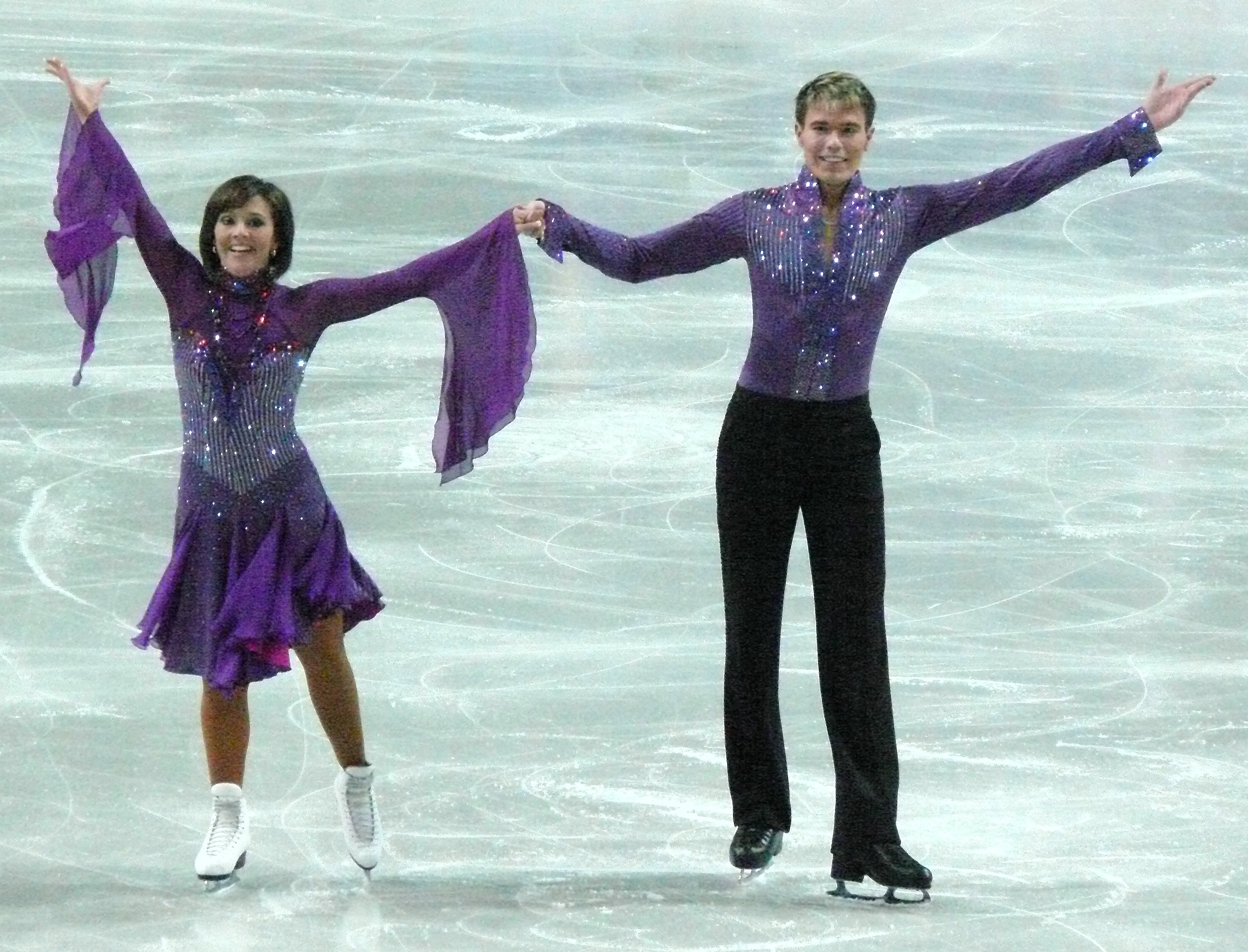
- Phillipa Towler-Green and Phillip Poole at the 2007 European Championships

Personal information
- Born: 11 May 1984 (age 42); Lambeth, London, England
- Height: 165 cm (5.41 ft)

Figure skating career
- Country: Great Britain
- Partner: Phillip Poole
- Coach: Diane Towler
- Skating club: South London Ice Dance Club
- Retired: December 2009

Phillipa Mary Towler-Green (born 11 May 1984 in Lambeth, London) is a former competitive English ice dancer.

== Career ==
Initially a singles and pair skater, Towler-Green took up ice dancing at age ten. With Robert Burgerman, she won two junior international medals: silver at the Pavel Roman Memorial and silver at the Mezzaluna Trophy in Rome. They represented Great Britain at four JGPs and one World Junior Championship and were crowned British junior ice dance champions in 2000.

In 2003, Towler-Green teamed up with Phillip Poole. They won the silver medal at the British Ice Figure and Dance Championships for four consecutive years from the 2005–06 season to 2008–09 season and represented Great Britain at the 2006, 2007 and 2008 European Championships as well as the 2009 World Championships held in Los Angeles. They won two international medals: in Oberstdorf (3rd) and at the Ondrei Nepala Memorial in Bratislava (2nd). As of 2010, the couple no longer skates together.

Poole and Towler-Green have also been part of the BBC New Year Eve show at Somerset House and have opened many of the open-air London ice rinks (Tiffany and Co. opening Somerset House, the Natural History Museum, Hampton Court Palace for Heart Radio, etc.). For 3 years running, they opened Winter Wonderland in Edinburgh, and also Southampton and Winchester ice rinks for Cousins entertainment. They also took part in the Dancing on Ice DFS ads and skated in Inspiration on Ice for Cancer Research alongside Nicky Slater. Towler-Green also appears in the Nokia N8 ad.

Phillipa worked for ITV's Dancing on Ice during the 2011–12 season as a reserve pro skater. She coached Chico, who went on to finish 3rd in the show. Phillipa also worked on the Dancing on Ice Goes Gold Olympic special, working with Colin Jackson, Tessa Sanderson, and Jamie Baulch. Phillipa then went on to be a full-time coach for the 2018 comeback show Dancing on Ice.

Towler-Green was also part of the 2012 London Olympic Closing Ceremony. She was part of the Eric Idol number as a roller skating nun.

Towler-Green now coaches with her mom, Diane Towler-Green MBE, and her twin sister, Candice, in south London.

== Personal life ==
Towler-Green is the daughter of former World Champion ice dancer Diane Towler, who was also her coach and the twin sister of ice dancer Candice Towler-Green, British Junior Champion 2001–02. She teaches at Streatham ice rink in London. Her godfather is Courtney Jones OBE who won World Ice Dance title with both Doreen Denny and later June Markham, and who is a member of the World Figure skating Hall of Fame and currently is an ISU Council member.

== Results ==
(with Poole)

Results
International
Event	2004–05	2005–06	2006–07	2007–08	2008–09	2009–10
World Championships					23rd	
European Championships		20th	23rd	18th		
Finlandia Trophy						6th
Nebelhorn Trophy	3rd	7th	9th	12th	9th	
Ondrej Nepela Memorial					5th	
National
British Championships	3rd	2nd	2nd	2nd	2nd	
