= Svetlana Alekseeva (figure skater) =

Russian ice dancer (born 1955)

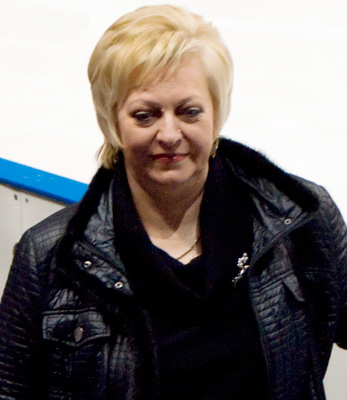
- Alexeeva at the 2010 Cup of Russia

Personal information
- Full name: Svetlana Lvovna Alekseeva
- Born: 16 March 1955 (age 71) Berlin, West Germany

Figure skating career
- Skating club: Blue Bird FSC

Svetlana Lvovna Alekseeva (Russian: Светлана Львовна Алексеева; born 16 March 1955) is a Russian figure skating coach and former ice dancer.

== Career ==
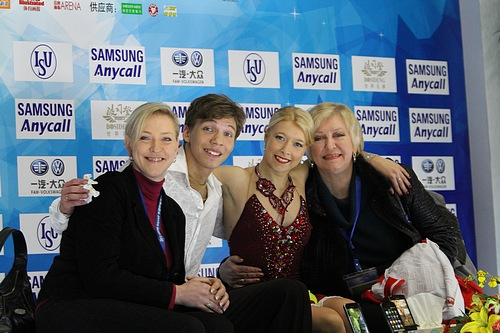
Alekseeva (far right) with Elena Kustarova (far left) and Ekaterina Bobrova and Dmitri Soloviev

=== Competitive ===
Alekseeva competed in ice dancing with Alexander Boychuk. They won the Soviet junior title in 1970.

=== Later career ===
Alekseeva began coaching in 1977 and worked with Tatiana Tarasova for thirteen years. Since 2001, she coaches with Elena Kustarova. In the summer of 2006, they moved to Blue Bird FSC in Moscow and then to a new rink in Medvedkovo in the summer of 2012.

Alekseeva coaches in collaboration with Elena Kustarova and Olga Riabinina. Her current students include (years coached in brackets):

- Diana Davis / Gleb Smolkin.
- Polina Ivanenko / Daniil Karpov.
- Irina Shtork / Taavi Rand.
- Anastasia Skoptsova / Kirill Aleshin (c. 2013–present), 2018 World Junior champions.
- Tiffany Zahorski / Jonathan Guerreiro (2017–present).

Her former students include:

- Svetlana Liapina / Gorsha Sur.
- Elena Kustarova / Oleg Ovsyannikov.
- Ekaterina Bobrova / Dmitri Soloviev (2000 – April 2012), 2011–12 European silver medalists.
- Maria Borounov / Evgeni Borounov.
- Elena Ilinykh / Ruslan Zhiganshin (2014–2016), 2015 Russian national champions.
- Ksenia Monko / Kirill Khaliavin (2009 – February 2012), 2011 World Junior champions.
- Anna Nagornyuk / Viktor Kovalenko (2011–2013).
- Anastasia Platonova / Alexander Grachev (2007–2009).
- Ekaterina Riazanova / Jonathan Guerreiro (2006–2009), 2009 World Junior bronze medalists.
- Ekaterina Rubleva / Ivan Shefer (?–2006).
- Victoria Sinitsina / Ruslan Zhiganshin (c. 2008 – April 2014), 2012 World Junior champions.
- Anna Yanovskaya / Sergey Mozgov (2011–2016), 2015 World Junior champions.
- Nelli Zhiganshina / Alexander Gazsi.
- Julia Zlobina / Alexei Sitnikov (2009–2011).

== Personal life ==
Alekseeva is the mother of Elena Kustarova.

== Competitive highlights ==
(with Boychuk)

International
Event	1969–70	1970–71	1971–72	1972–73	1973–74
Prize of Moscow News	6th	5th	4th		3rd
National
Soviet Championships	4th			4th	3rd
Soviet Junior Champ.	1st				
