= Maria Borounov =

Australian former competitive ice dancer

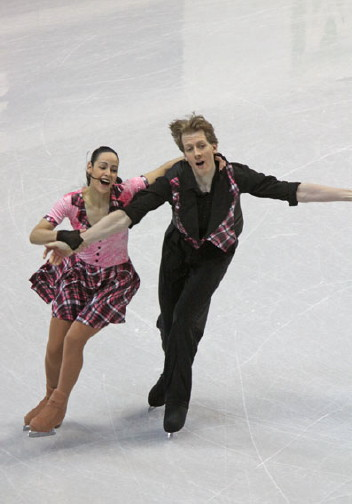
- The Borounovs in 2009.

Personal information
- Born: 14 May 1982 (age 44) Perth, Western Australia
- Height: 160 cm (5 ft 3 in)

Figure skating career
- Country: Australia
- Partner: Evgueni Borounov
- Coach: Elena Kustarova, Svetlana Alexeeva, Andrei Filippov
- Skating club: Cockburn Ice Arena
- Began skating: 1993
- Retired: 2011

Maria Borounov (born 14 May 1982) is an Australian former competitive ice dancer. Competing with her husband, Evgueni Borounov, she became the 2006–2007 Australian national champion and competed at six Four Continents Championships.

== Personal life ==
Maria Borounov was born on 14 May 1982 in Perth, Western Australia. She studied justice and business law at university. She met Evgueni Borounov in 2000 and married him in 2002.

== Career ==
Maria Borounov began learning to skate in 1993. At age 16, she sustained a knee injury, resulting in dislocation of the patella and extensive tissue damage. She underwent surgery and returned to the ice a year later.

In 2002, she collided with a fellow skater, resulting in another knee injury, which led her to switch from singles to ice dancing. She teamed up with her husband, Evgueni Borounov, an experienced ice dancer from Russia, and completed all of her dance tests in a year.

During their career, the Borounovs trained in Perth, Western Australia, and Moscow, Russia. They began traveling to Russia in 2005, to train under Elena Kustarova and Svetlana Alexeeva. Their first major international was the 2006 Four Continents Championships, where they placed 14th. They won the Australian national title in the 2006–2007 season and took the bronze medal at the 2007 NRW Trophy.

They competed at six consecutive Four Continents, from 2006 to 2011. Kustarova and Alexeeva served as their coaches until the end of the 2008–2009 season. The Borounovs retired from competition in 2011.

Maria Borounov is a coach at Cockburn Ice Arena in Perth.

== Programs ==
(with Evgueni Borounov)

Season	Short dance	Free dance
2010–2011	Waltz: Masquerade by Aram Khachaturian by choreo. by Maria and Evgeni Borounov	Leelo's Tune by Maksim Mrvica choreo. by Maria and Evgeni Borounov
	Original dance	
2009–2010	Australian dance: G'day G'day by Rob Fairbairn choreo. by Maria and Evgeni Borounov	Palladio by Escala choreo. by Maria and Evgeni Borounov
2008–2009	Swing: Zoot Suit Riot choreo. by Elena Kustarova	Humanity; Maybe I Maybe You; Humanity by the Scorpions choreo. by Elena Kustarova
2007–2008	Flamenco: Un Amore by the Gipsy Kings choreo. by Elena Kustarova	Romeo and Juliet (modern arrangement) by Sergei Prokofiev; Fireworks by Edvin Marton; Romeo and Juliet (modern arrangement) by Sergei Prokofiev choreo. by Elena Kustarova
2006–2007	Tango: Libertango by Astor Piazzolla performed by Bond choreo. by Elena Kustarova	Plunkett & Macleane by Craig Armstrong; Ball; Business; Hanging; Escape choreo. by Elena Kustarova
2005–2006	Samba: Sway by Norman Gimbel, Pablo Beltrán Ruiz; Rhumba: Beautiful Maria of My Soul by Robert Kraft, Arne Glimcher; Samba: Sway by Norman Gimbel, Pablo Beltrán Ruiz choreo. by Elena Kustarova	Plunkett & Macleane by Craig Armstrong; Ball; Business; Hanging; Escape choreo. by Elena Kustarova

== Competitive highlights ==
(with Evgueni Borounov)

International
Event	05–06	06–07	07–08	08–09	09–10	10–11
Four Continents	14th	12th	13th	11th	12th	11th
Golden Spin			15th			
Ice Challenge						11th
NRW Trophy			3rd			12th
Ondrej Nepela				9th	WD	
Pavel Roman				5th		
National
Australia	2nd	1st		2nd	2nd	2nd
WD = Withdrew
