= Evgeni Borounov =

Russian-Australian ice dancer

Evgueni Borounov
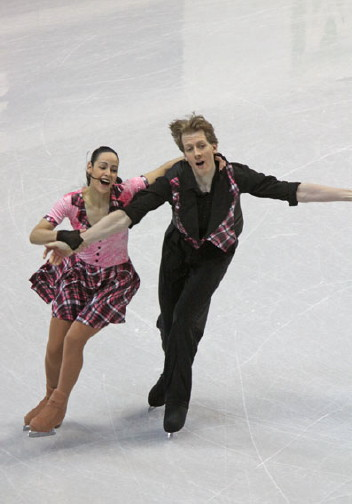
- The Borounovs (Evgueni on the right, Elena on the left) in 2009

Personal information
- Born: 10 June 1979 (age 47) Moscow, Russian SFSR, Soviet Union
- Height: 1.83 m (6 ft 0 in)

Figure skating career
- Country: Australia
- Partner: Maria Borounov
- Coach: Elena Kustarova, Svetlana Alexeeva, Andrei Filippov
- Skating club: Cockburn Ice Arena
- Began skating: 1984
- Retired: 2011

Evgueni Borounov (born 10 June 1979) is a Russian-Australian former competitive ice dancer. Competing for Australia with his wife, Maria Borounov, he became the 2006–2007 Australian national champion and competed at six Four Continents Championships.

== Personal life ==
Evgueni Borounov was born 10 June 1979 in Moscow, Russian SFSR, Soviet Union. He graduated with a nursing degree in Russia. He emigrated to Australia in 1999 and married Australian Maria Borounov in 2002.

== Skating career ==
=== Early years ===
Borounov began learning to skate in Russia in 1984. When he was eleven years old, he switched from singles to ice dancing at the suggestion of ice dancing coach Gennadi Akkermann. He and Svetlana Kulikova skated together for four years. They intended to compete for Lithuania at the 1995 World Junior Championships but were withdrawn after Lithuania's skating federation decided against having a pair of Russians represent the country.

=== For Australia ===
After moving to Australia, Borounov began training under Andrei Filippov in Perth. He teamed up with Maria Borounov (until then a singles skater) in 2002, and coached his wife through all of her dance tests.

During their career, the Borounovs trained in Perth, Australia, and Moscow, Russia. They began traveling to Russia in 2005, to train under Elena Kustarova and Svetlana Alexeeva. Their first major international was the 2006 Four Continents Championships, where they placed 14th. They won the Australian national title in the 2006–2007 season and took the bronze medal at the 2007 NRW Trophy.

They competed at six consecutive Four Continents, from 2006 to 2011. Kustarova and Alexeeva served as their coaches until the end of the 2008–2009 season. The Borounovs retired from competition in 2011.

Evgueni Borounov is a coach at Cockburn Ice Arena in Perth.

== Programs ==
(with Maria Borounov)

Season	Short dance	Free dance
2010–2011	Waltz: Masquerade by Aram Khachaturian by choreo. by Maria and Evgeni Borounov	Leelo's Tune by Maksim Mrvica choreo. by Maria and Evgeni Borounov
	Original dance	
2009–2010	Australian dance: G'day G'day by Rob Fairbairn choreo. by Maria and Evgeni Borounov	Palladio by Escala choreo. by Maria and Evgeni Borounov
2008–2009	Swing: Zoot Suit Riot choreo. by Elena Kustarova	Humanity; Maybe I Maybe You; Humanity by the Scorpions choreo. by Elena Kustarova
2007–2008	Flamenco: Un Amore by the Gipsy Kings choreo. by Elena Kustarova	Romeo and Juliet (modern arrangement) by Sergei Prokofiev; Fireworks by Edvin Marton; Romeo and Juliet (modern arrangement) by Sergei Prokofiev choreo. by Elena Kustarova
2006–2007	Tango: Libertango by Astor Piazzolla performed by Bond choreo. by Elena Kustarova	Plunkett & Macleane by Craig Armstrong; Ball; Business; Hanging; Escape choreo. by Elena Kustarova
2005–2006	Samba: Sway by Norman Gimbel, Pablo Beltrán Ruiz; Rhumba: Beautiful Maria of My Soul by Robert Kraft, Arne Glimcher; Samba: Sway by Norman Gimbel, Pablo Beltrán Ruiz choreo. by Elena Kustarova	Plunkett & Macleane by Craig Armstrong; Ball; Business; Hanging; Escape choreo. by Elena Kustarova

== Competitive highlights ==
(with Maria Borounov)

International
Event	05–06	06–07	07–08	08–09	09–10	10–11
Four Continents	14th	12th	13th	11th	12th	11th
Golden Spin			15th			
Ice Challenge						11th
NRW Trophy			3rd			12th
Ondrej Nepela				9th	WD	
Pavel Roman				5th		
National
Australia	2nd	1st	2nd	2nd	2nd	2nd
WD = Withdrew
