= Jonathan Guerreiro =

Australian-Russian ice dancer (born 1991)

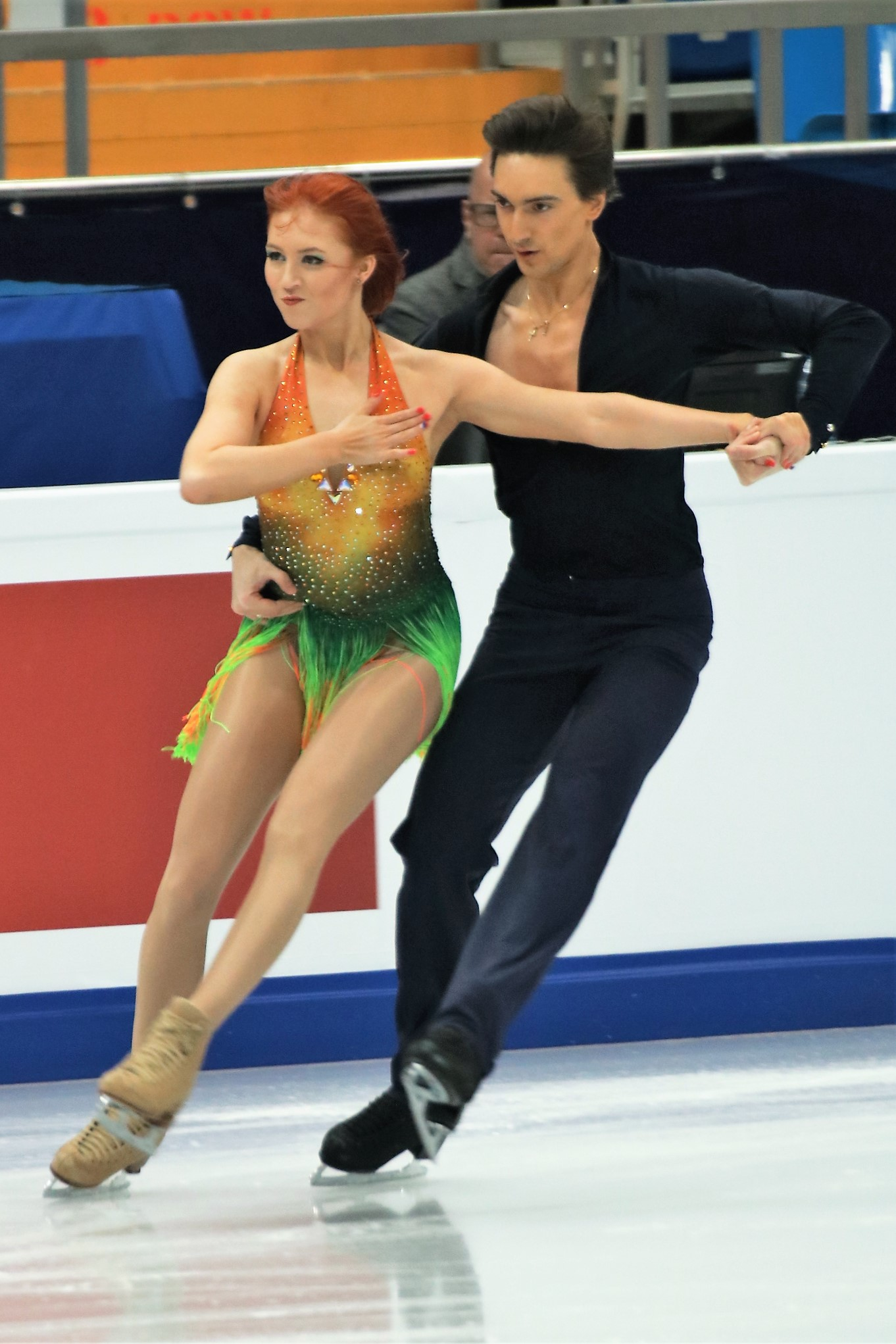

Personal information
- Full name: Jonathan Franciscovich Guerreiro
- Born: 3 April 1991 (age 35) Sydney, Australia
- Height: 1.87 m (6 ft 2 in)

Figure skating career
- Country: Russia
- Partner: Tiffany Zahorski
- Skating club: Vorobievie Gory
- Began skating: 2000
- Retired: July 17, 2023
Medal record
Figure skating: Ice dancing
Representing Russia (with Pushkash)
World Junior Championships
Silver medal – second place	2011 Gangneung	Ice dancing
Representing Russia (with Riazanova)
World Junior Championships
Bronze medal – third place	2009 Sofia	Ice dancing
Junior Grand Prix Final
Bronze medal – third place	2008–09 Goyang	Ice dancing

Jonathan Franciscovich Guerreiro (Russian: Джонатан Францискович Гурейро; born 3 April 1991) is a retired Australian-Russian ice dancer. Representing Russia with Tiffany Zahorski, he is the 2018 NHK Trophy silver medalist, the 2018 Skate America bronze medalist, and a three-time Russian national medalist (2021 silver; 2018, 2020 bronze).

Earlier in his career, he won medals at two World Junior Championships — bronze in 2009 with Ekaterina Riazanova and silver in 2011 with Ekaterina Pushkash.

== Personal life ==
Guerreiro was born on 3 April 1991 in Sydney, Australia, to Svetlana Liapina, a former ice dancer for the Soviet Union, and Francisco Guerreiro from Portugal. He grew up in Australia before moving to Moscow with his family in 2005. He holds dual Russian-Australian citizenship.

== Early career ==
After early partnerships with Australians Kiah Pilz and Rachael Reading, Guerreiro competed on the Russian regional level with Daria Panfilova. He teamed up with Ekaterina Riazanova in the summer of 2006. They competed together for three seasons and won the bronze medal at the 2009 World Junior Championships. They were coached by Elena Kustarova and Svetlana Alexeeva at Blue Bird FSC in Moscow. Shortly after the 2009 Junior Worlds, Riazanova ended the partnership to skate with Ilia Tkachenko.

=== Partnership with Pushkash ===
==== Junior career ====
Coaches Irina Zhuk and Alexander Svinin arranged a tryout with Ekaterina Pushkash and they teamed up in May 2009. They finished fifth at the 2009–10 Junior Grand Prix Final and won the bronze medal at the 2010 Russian Junior Championships. At the end of the season, they switched coaches to Natalia Linichuk and Gennadi Karponossov, which required them to move to Aston, Pennsylvania in the United States.

During the 2010–11 season, they finished fourth at the JGP Final. At the 2011 Russian Junior Championships, they won the silver medal and were assigned to the World Junior Championships where they won silver.

==== Senior career ====
Pushkash and Guerreiro moved up to the senior level for the 2011–12 season. Guerreiro fractured his left foot in training in June 2011, causing them to miss a few weeks of training. They competed at two Grand Prix events, 2011 Skate Canada and 2011 Cup of Russia. At the end of the season, they changed coaches to Nikolai Morozov in Moscow.

Prior to the 2013–14 season, Pushkash and Guerreiro began training with Anjelika Krylova and Pasquale Camerlengo in Bloomfield Hills, Michigan. They ended their partnership at the end of the season.

== Partnership with Zahorski ==
=== 2014–15 season ===
In 2014, Guerreiro formed a partnership with French ice dancer Tiffany Zahorski, coached by Alexander Zhulin. In July 2014, the Russian Federation asked the French Skating Federation (FFSG) to release her to skate for Russia. They placed fifth at the 2015 Russian Championships.

=== 2015–16 season ===
The FFSG released Zahorski in October 2015, three years and nine months after her last competition for France, allowing Zahorski/Guerreiro to appear for Russia internationally. The two made their international debut at the 2015 Santa Claus Cup, winning the gold medal. They finished fifth at the 2016 Russian Championships.

=== 2016–17 season ===
In the 2016–17 season, Zahorski/Guerreiro won the bronze medal at the 2016 CS Ondrej Nepela Memorial after placing third in both segments and earning a new personal best total score of 165.64 points. They received another bronze medal in their next event, the 2016 CS Finlandia Trophy. They then made their Grand Prix series debut at the 2016 Rostelecom Cup where they placed fifth. A few weeks later they won their third CS medal of the season, the silver at the 2016 CS Warsaw Cup with a personal best score of 173.02 points.

For the third consecutive year, they finished fifth at the Russian Championships. Zahorski competed in the free dance after developing a fever.

In mid-May 2017 Zahorski/Guerreiro changed coaches to Elena Kustarova and Svetlana Alexeeva

=== 2017–18 season: Pyeongchang Olympics ===
Zahorski/Guerreiro started their season by winning the silver medal at the 2017 CS Minsk-Arena Ice Star. Competing on the Grand Prix series, they placed fourth at the 2017 Cup of China and sixth at the 2017 Skate America.

In December 2017 they won the bronze medal at the 2018 Russian Championships. A month later they placed 6th at the 2018 European Championships after placing eighth in the short dance and sixth in the free dance.

It was announced by the Russian Figure Skating Federation on 23 January 2018 that Ivan Bukin was not invited to the 2018 Winter Olympics. Because of this, Zahorski/Guerreiro were sent instead. Zahorski/Guerreiro placed thirteenth at the 2018 Winter Olympics. Later they placed eighth at the 2018 World Championships with a personal best score of 180.42 points.

=== 2018–19 season ===
Zahorski suffered from a recurrence of a knee injury over the summer that limited the duo's training time leading up to the new season. Zahorski/Guerreiro started their season at the 2018 Skate America. They ranked third in the rhythm dance and fourth in the free dance, placing third overall. The bronze medal was their first Grand Prix medal. Guerreiro said: "We haven't had this many free dance run-throughs under our belts, so we just kind of prayed and hoped for the best. Overall, it's a good start." In early November Zahorski/Guerreiro competed at their second Grand Prix event of the season, the 2018 NHK Trophy, where they won the silver medal with a personal best score of 183.05 points.

With one Grand Prix silver medal and one bronze medal they qualified for the 2018–19 Grand Prix Final, where they finished fifth.

At the 2019 Russian Championships, Zahorski/Guerreiro placed third in the rhythm dance, several points behind the top two teams but more than three points ahead of fourth-place finishers Sofia Evdokimova / Egor Bazin. The team had major problems in the free dance, with Guerreiro's boot laces coming undone early on, and Zahorski making errors on both her twizzles and the one-foot step sequence. Consequently, they dropped to seventh place in the free dance and overall, and were not named to the Russian team to the European Championships.

=== 2019–20 season ===
Zahorski tore the meniscus in her knee late in the summer, causing the team to lose significant training time.

Zahorski/Guerreiro debuted their programs at the Russian test skates, citing their "Survivor" free dance as having been chosen to differentiate themselves from the prevailing lyrical style of skating. They did not compete a Challenger event, and made their return to the Grand Prix at 2019 Skate America, where they placed fifth. They were fifth as well at the 2019 Internationaux de France.

Competing at the 2020 Russian Championships, Zahorski/Guerreiro placed third in the rhythm dance. Third in the free dance as well, they returned to the national podium as bronze medalists. Zahorski said "before this competition, we actually got in training. We had a good two and a half weeks of training, so hopefully, going into Europeans, we'll add more and it will be much better." At the 2020 European Championships, they placed fourth in the fifth in the rhythm dance, but dropped to sixth place after the free dance. They had been assigned to compete at the World Championships in Montreal, but these were cancelled as a result of the COVID-19 pandemic.

=== 2020–21 season ===
Zahorski contracted a mild case of COVID-19 in the off-season, but the team nevertheless debuted at the senior test skates. They competed in the third stage of the Cup of Russia series in Sochi, beating Khudaiberdieva/Bazin for gold by 4.02 points.

With the Grand Prix assigned based primarily on geographic location, Zahorski/Guerreiro competed at the 2020 Rostelecom Cup, coming second in the short program. They were second in the free dance as well, taking the silver medal.

Two-time defending national champions Sinitsina/Katsalapov sat out the 2021 Russian Championships, making Zahorski/Guerreiro the presumptive silver medalists behind Stepanova/Bukin. They indeed placed second in both programs, taking another silver medal. While the 2021 European Championships had already been cancelled due to the pandemic, and assignments for the 2021 World Championships other than the national champions were withheld pending later domestic results.

Following the national championships, Zahorski/Guerreiro participated in the 2021 Channel One Trophy, a televised team competition held in lieu of the cancelled European Championships. They were selected for the Red Machine team captained by Alina Zagitova. They placed second in both their segments of the competition, while their team finished in first overall. They did not participate in the Russian Cup Final.

=== 2021–22 season ===
The team's preparations for the new season were hindered by Guerreiro contracting COVID-19 over the summer. As a result of this, their new free dance was not ready for debut by the Russian test skates, and they performed their rhythm dance twice. They subsequently withdrew from their first Grand Prix assignment, the 2021 Skate America. On October 14, Guerreiro and Zahorski's coach Svetlana Alekseeva told TASS that Zahorski was in an infectious diseases hospital.

Returning to competition for the 2022 Russian Championships, Zahorski/Guerreiro were fourth in the rhythm dance, 4.60 points behind the newcomers Davis/Smolkin, a result which attracted audible boos from audience members in Saint Petersburg. However, they struggled through the free dance, with Zahorski immediately going to the medical room upon leaving the ice, and dropped to eighth position overall. Guerreiro said afterward "we wanted to fight for a spot on the Olympic team and we knew it would be a hard competition. Tiffani skated well in the rhythm dance, but today it was just physically not possible."

In the fall of 2022, Guerreiro announced that he and Zahorski would take indefinite time off from competing to allow Zahorski to recover from her longstanding illness.

Zahorski/Guerreiro officially announced their retirement on July 17, 2023.

== Post-competitive career ==
In 2022, Guerreiro moved back to Sydney, Australia, where he now works as a figure skating choreographer.

== Programs ==
=== With Zahorski ===
Season	Rhythm dance	Free dance	Exhibition
2021–22	Jogi by Panjabi MC; Buzz by Aastha Gill, feat. Badshah choreo. by Elena Kustarova and Olga Riabinina	Toxic; Smoke on the Water performed by 2WEI choreo. by Christopher Dean	
2019–21	March: The Greatest Show; Quickstep: From Now On; Waltz: Tightrope performed by Michelle Williams; March: The Greatest Show (from The Greatest Showman) by Benj Pasek & Justin Paul	Survivor: (Epic Cover) by 2WEI	All I Want for Christmas Is You by Mariah Carey
2018–19	Tango: Bésame Mucho; Tango: Selection by Astor Piazzolla	Blues for Klook by Eddy Louiss	
	Short dance		
2017–18	Samba: Hip Hip Chin Chin performed by Club des Belugas; Rhumba: Volveras performed by Gloria Estefan; Samba: Batucada Brasiliera performed by Samba Brazilian Batucada Band	Muse medley: Exogenesis Symphony Part III; Exogenesis Symphony Part II; Ruled by Secrecy	You are beautiful by Joe Cocker
2016–17	Blues: Nasty Naughty Boy by Christina Aguilera; Swing: All night long by Parov Stelar	Nocturne; Bohemian Rhapsody by Queen	Wicked Game by Gemma Hayes; Valse triste by Jean Sibelius
2015–16	The Nutcracker Waltz by Pyotr Ilyich Tchaikovsky; Pizzicato Polka by Josef Strauss, Johann Strauss II; The Great Gatsby soundtrack	Nocturne; Bohemian Rhapsody by Queen	The Nutcracker Waltz by Pyotr Ilyich Tchaikovsky; Pizzicato Polka by Josef Strauss, Johann Strauss II
2014–15	Paso doble	Amélie by Yann Tiersen	

=== With Pushkash ===
Season	Short dance	Free dance	Exhibition
2013–14	Show Me How You Burlesque by Christina Aguilera	Somewhere in Time by John Barry performed by Maksim Mrvica	
2012–13	Quidam; Marelle; Zydeko	Tristan & Iseult by Maxime Rodriguez	
2011–12	Samba: Conga by Gloria Estefan; Rhumba: La Vuelta by Gizelle D'Cole; Samba: Mujer Latina by Thalía	Capriccio Rhapsody by Niccolò Paganini	
2010–11	Waltz: Algo pequeñito by Daniel Diges	Scorchio by Tonči Huljić	Bust Your Windows by Jazmine Sullivan
	Original dance		
2009–10	Russian folk: Barynya	Un Giorno Per Noi (from Romeo and Juliet) by Nino Rota performed by Jonathan Ansell, Hayley Westenra	

=== With Riazanova ===
Season	Original dance	Free dance
2008–09	Slow foxtrot: C'est Si Bon performed by Louis Armstrong; Swing: Sing, Sing, Sing by Louis Prima	James Bond medley; Music by Monty Norman and John Barry; GoldenEye performed by Tina Turner
2007–08	Gulya (from Road of The Gypsies) by Loyko; Yabloko (from Queen of the Gypsies) by Eugen Doga	Perfida by Alberto Dominguez
2006–07	Weary Sun by Jerzy Petersburski version by Aleksandr Tsfasman	Spanish Dance by Jose Moren

== Competitive highlights ==
GP: Grand Prix; CS: Challenger Series; JGP: Junior Grand Prix

=== With Zahorski ===
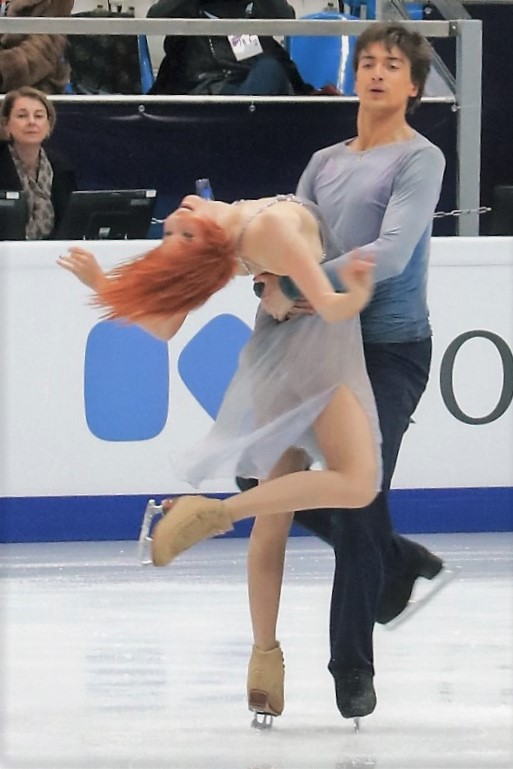
Zahorski and Guerreiro at the 2018 European Championships

International
Event	14–15	15–16	16–17	17–18	18–19	19–20	20–21	21–22
Olympics				13th				
Worlds				8th		C	10th	
Europeans				6th		6th		
GP Final					5th			
GP Cup of China				4th				
GP France						5th		WD
GP NHK Trophy					2nd			
GP Rostelecom			5th				2nd	
GP Skate America				6th	3rd	5th		WD
CS Finlandia			3rd					
CS Golden Spin				6th				
CS Ice Star				2nd				
CS Nepela Memorial			3rd					
CS Warsaw Cup			2nd					
Santa Claus Cup		1st						
Warsaw Cup					1st			
National
Russian Champ.	5th	5th	5th	3rd	7th	3rd	2nd	8th
Russian Cup Final		1st	1st		1st			
TBD = Assigned; WD = Withdrew; C = Event cancelled

=== With Pushkash ===
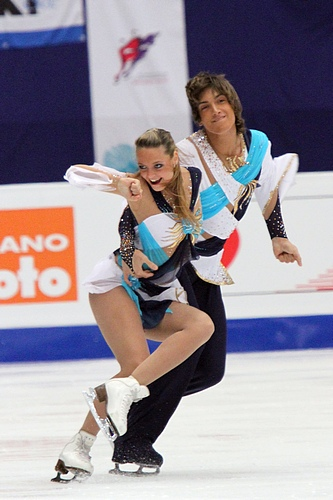
Guerreiro and Pushkash at the 2010–11 JGP Final

International
Event	09–10	10–11	11–12	12–13	13–14
GP Bompard				7th	
GP Rostel. Cup			7th		
GP Skate Canada			6th		
Bavarian Open			2nd	5th	
Crystal Skate				2nd	
Ice Star					3rd
Nepela Memorial			2nd		9th
Toruń Cup					1st
International: Junior
Junior Worlds		2nd			
JGP Final	5th	4th			
JGP Czech Rep.		1st			
JGP Germany	1st				
JGP Japan		2nd			
JGP Turkey	2nd				
NRW Trophy	1st J				
National
Russian Champ.			4th	6th	8th
Russian Jr. Champ.	3rd	2nd			
J = Junior level; WD = Withdrew

=== With Riazanova ===
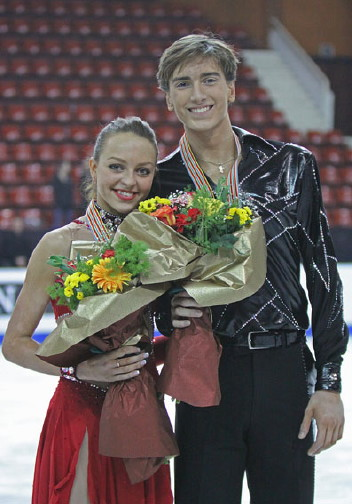
Guerreiro with Ekaterina Riazanova at the 2009 Junior Worlds

International: Junior
Event	06–07	07–08	08–09
World Junior Champ.		6th	3rd
JGP Final		8th	3rd
JGP Germany		2nd	
JGP Italy			2nd
JGP Romania	9th	2nd	
JGP Spain			1st
NRW Trophy			1st J
National
Russian Junior Champ.		3rd	1st
J = Junior level

=== With Pilz ===
National
Event	2002–03
Australian Championships	3rd N
N = Novice level

== Detailed results ==
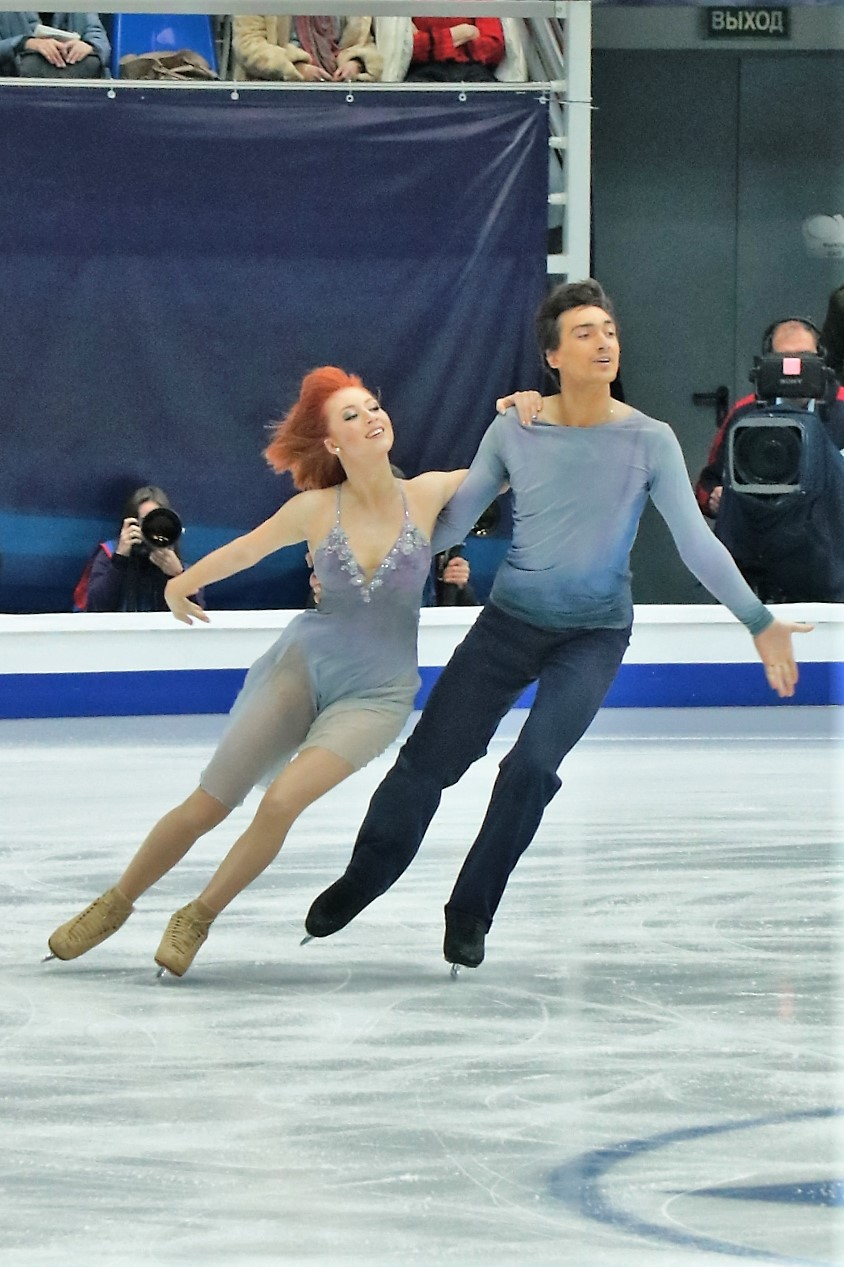
Zahorski and Guerreiro at the 2018 European Championships

Small medals for short and free programs awarded only at ISU Championships. At team events, medals awarded for team results only.

With Zahorski

2021–22 season
Date	Event	RD	FD	Total
21–26 December 2021	2022 Russian Championships	4; 79.36	9; 100.14	8; 179.50
2020–21 season
Date	Event	RD	FD	Total
22–28 March 2021	2021 World Championships	10; 75.58	10; 112.87	10; 188.45
5–7 February 2021	2021 Channel One Trophy	2; 85.76	2; 128.05	1T/2P; 213.81
23–27 December 2020	2021 Russian Championships	2; 84.02	2; 126.92	2; 210.94
20–22 November 2020	2020 Rostelecom Cup	2; 84.46	2; 122.45	2; 206.91
23–27 October 2020	2020 Cup of Russia Series, 3rd Stage, Sochi domestic competition	1; 80.64	1; 120.38	1; 201.02
2019–20 season
Date	Event	RD	FD	Total
20–26 January 2020	2020 European Championships	5; 75.10	6; 112.93	6; 188.03
24–29 December 2019	2020 Russian Championships	3; 77.38	3; 120.35	3; 197.73
1–3 November 2019	2019 Internationaux de France	5; 75.05	5; 109.39	5; 184.44
18–20 October 2019	2019 Skate America	5; 71.18	5; 110.64	5; 181.82
2018–19 season
Date	Event	RD	FD	Total
19–23 December 2018	2019 Russian Championships	3; 73.37	7; 98.39	7; 171.76
6–9 December 2018	2018–19 Grand Prix Final	5; 72.98	6; 111.39	5; 184.37
23–25 November 2018	2018 Warsaw Cup	1; 74.85	1; 112.55	1; 187.40
9–11 November 2018	2018 NHK Trophy	1; 75.49	4; 107.56	2; 183.05
19–21 October 2018	2018 Skate America	3; 73.30	4; 108.08	3; 181.38
2017–18 season
Date	Event	SD	FD	Total
19–25 March 2018	2018 World Championships	8; 72.45	8; 107.97	8; 180.42
14–25 February 2018	2018 Winter Olympics	13; 66.47	14; 95.77	13; 162.24
15–21 January 2018	2018 European Championships	8; 65.35	6; 103.10	6; 168.45
21–24 December 2017	2018 Russian Championships	3; 71.52	4; 104.26	3; 175.78
6–9 December 2017	2017 CS Golden Spin of Zagreb	6; 62.92	6; 94.92	6; 157.84
24–26 November 2017	2017 Skate America	4; 64.20	6; 96.08	6; 160.28
3–5 November 2017	2017 Cup of China	4; 67.62	4; 96.79	4; 164.41
26–29 October 2017	2017 CS Minsk-Arena Ice Star	2; 67.99	2; 101.82	2; 169.81
2016–17 season
Date	Event	SD	FD	Total
22–25 December 2016	2017 Russian Championships	5; 69.01	5; 100.45	5; 169.46
17–20 November 2016	2016 CS Warsaw Cup	2; 69.06	2; 103.96	2; 173.02
4–6 November 2016	2016 Rostelecom Cup	5; 64.28	5; 92.67	5; 156.95
6–10 October 2016	2016 CS Finlandia Trophy	3; 62.27	4; 90.73	3; 153.00
30 September – 2 October 2016	2016 CS Ondrej Nepela Memorial	3; 68.04	3; 97.60	3; 165.64
2015–16 season
Date	Event	SD	FD	Total
23–27 December 2015	2016 Russian Championships	5; 61.30	5; 98.30	5; 159.60
28–30 November 2015	2015 Santa Claus Cup	1; 57.97	1; 93.50	1; 151.47
2014–15 season
Date	Event	SD	FD	Total
24–28 December 2014	2015 Russian Championships	5; 59.62	5; 85.51	5; 145.13
