= Ekaterina Riazanova =

Russian ice dancer (born 1991)

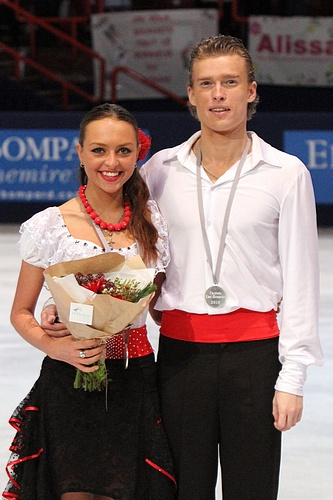
- Riazanova and Tkachenko in 2010

Personal information
- Full name: Ekaterina Vladimirovna Riazanova
- Born: 6 April 1991 (age 35) Moscow, Russian SFSR, Soviet Union
- Height: 1.67 m (5 ft 6 in)

Figure skating career
- Country: Russia
- Began skating: 1995
- Retired: 2015
Medal record
Figure skating: Ice dancing
Representing Russia (with Tkachenko)
Russian Championships
| Silver medal – second place | 2011 Saransk | Ice dancing |
| Bronze medal – third place | 2012 Saransk | Ice dancing |
| Bronze medal – third place | 2013 Sochi | Ice dancing |
Representing Russia (with Guerreiro)
World Junior Championships
| Bronze medal – third place | 2009 Sofia | Ice dancing |
Junior Grand Prix Final
| Bronze medal – third place | 2008–09 Goyang | Ice dancing |

Ekaterina Vladimirovna Riazanova (Russian: Екатерина Владимировна Рязанова, born 6 April 1991) is a Russian former competitive ice dancer. With former partner Ilia Tkachenko, she is the 2010 Trophée Eric Bompard silver medalist, the 2012 Skate Canada bronze medalist, and a three-time Russian national medalist.

== Career ==
=== Early career ===
Riazanova's parents put her in skating to improve her health. She skated in singles until ankle problems led her to take up ice dancing under coach Svetlana Alexeeva. She skated for six months with her first partner, Kirill Vakhnenko, and then teamed up with Jonathan Guerreiro in the summer of 2006. Riazanova/Guerreiro competed together for three seasons and won the bronze medal at the 2009 World Junior Championships. They were coached by Elena Kustarova and Svetlana Alexeeva at Blue Bird FSC in Moscow.

=== Senior career ===
In spring 2009, Ilia Tkachenko expressed interest in skating with Riazanova. After a tryout, they both felt it would be a good partnership, despite her needing time to adapt to his different technique and some disapproval from the Russian skating federation. They were coached by Alexei Gorshkov at Odintsovo FSC, near Moscow.

Riazanova/Tkachenko began competing together during the 2009–10 season. They finished fourth at the 2009 Nebelhorn Trophy, sixth at their sole Grand Prix event, the 2009 Cup of Russia, and fourth at the Russian Nationals.

Riazanova/Tkachenko decided to scrap the free dance they had planned for the 2010–11 season and prepare a new one. They placed fifth at their first Grand Prix event of the season, the 2010 Skate America, and then won silver at the 2010 Trophée Eric Bompard. At the 2011 Russian Nationals, they won the silver medal and their first berth to the European Championships. At the 2011 Europeans, Riazanova/Tkachenko placed fifth in the short dance, sixth in the free dance, and sixth overall. Russia had only two spots to the World Championships and since both Bobrova/Soloviev and Ilinykh/Katsalapov had placed ahead of them at Europeans, they did not make the team, however, they continued training as first alternates and also worked on new programs until the end of May; after vacation, they resumed training for the new season on 20 June, including a three-week camp in Bulgaria.

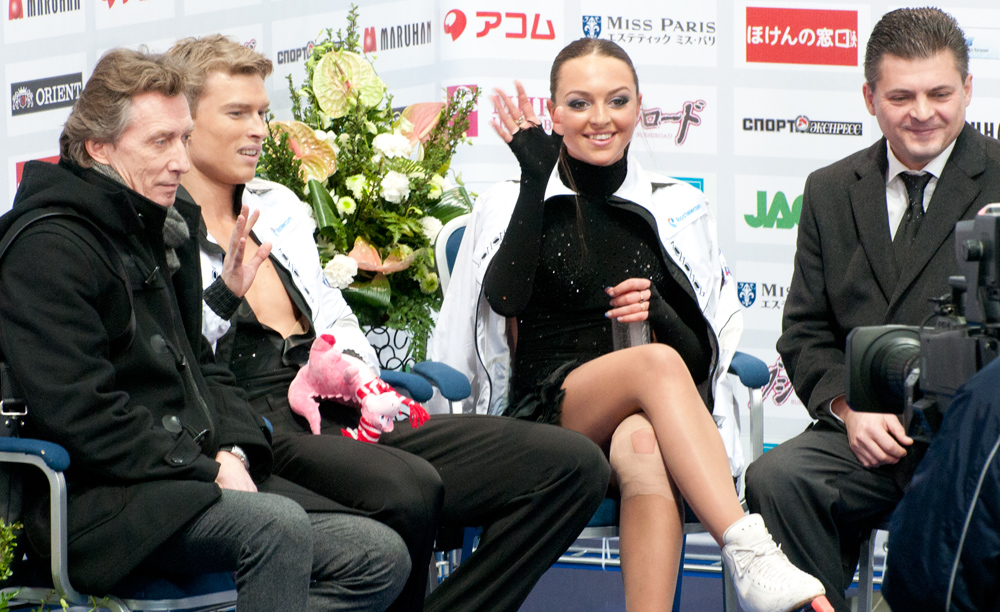
Riazanova and Tkachenko with coach Alexei Gorshkov (right) and choreographer Sergei Petukhov (left)

For the 2011–12 season, Riazanova/Tkachenko were assigned to 2011 Skate Canada and 2011 Cup of Russia as their Grand Prix events. On their free dance, which was choreographed by Sergei Petukhov, Riazanova said, "A young woman remembers her beloved, who is no longer alive. She is so deeply immersed in the memories of happy times that her dreams seem to become reality for a short while." They had to withdraw from 2011 Nebelhorn Trophy because Tkachenko's new passport was not ready. On 13 December 2011, Riazanova sustained a concussion and a broken nose when Tkachenko accidentally elbowed her in practice; she was released from hospital at her own risk on 20 December. At the Russian Championships which began on 25 December, Riazanova/Tkachenko won the bronze medal after placing third in the short dance and fourth in the free dance. They finished 5th overall at the 2012 European Championships but received a small bronze medal for their 3rd place in the short dance. They finished 9th at the 2012 World Championships.

In April 2012, Tkachenko said they would spend some time preparing for the following season in Marina Zueva and Igor Shpilband's group in the U.S., however, the coaches parted ways so the skaters decided to train with Shpilband in Novi, Michigan. At a camp in Bulgaria, Tkachenko lost his balance while practicing a lift on the floor in skates and stepped on Riazanova's hand; she had surgery on her hand and recovered well. At the suggestion of Tatiana Tarasova, they decided to scrap a new free dance to Pink Floyd's Hey You and made a new one to a waltz from the Godfather films. Riazanova/Tkachenko won bronze medals at the 2012 Skate Canada and 2012 Trophée Eric Bompard. They repeated as bronze medalists at the 2013 Russian Championships.

In the 2013–14 season, Riazanova/Tkachenko finished fourth in their two Grand Prix events, the 2013 Skate Canada and the 2013 Rostelecom Cup. They then finished fourth at the 2014 Russian Championships behind Victoria Sinitsina / Ruslan Zhiganshin. On 24 April 2014, Riazanova announced that they had parted ways and that she was seeking a new partner to continue her career.

Riazanova had a tryout with Italy's Simone Vaturi. In May 2014, she stated that the Russian federation had agreed to release her to skate for another country.

== Personal life ==
Ekaterina Riazanova's father, Vladimir, was a member of the Russian national rugby team. She has an older brother. Riazanova studied at the Institute of Physiculture.

== Programs ==
=== With Tkachenko ===
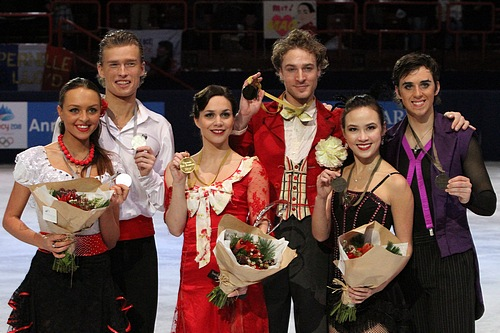
Riazanova and Tkachenko at the 2010 Trophee Eric Bompard

| Season | Short dance | Free dance | Exhibition |
|---|---|---|---|
| 2013–2014 | Chicago by John Kander | The Phantom of the Opera by Andrew Lloyd Webber | Hey You by Pink Floyd |
| 2012–2013 | My Fair Lady: I Could Have Danced All Night; With a Little Bit of Luck by Frederick Loewe | The Godfather by Nino Rota | Hey You by Pink Floyd |
| 2011–2012 | Paxi Ni Ngongo by Bonga; Cuba | Romance (from The Blizzard) by Georgy Sviridov choreo. by Sergei Petukhov | The Master and Margarita by Igor Kornelyuk |
| 2010–2011 | Waltz (from The Blizzard) by Georgy Sviridov | Danzón No. 2 by Arturo Márquez | The Master and Margarita by Igor Kornelyuk |
| | Original dance | | |
| 2009–2010 | Berezka | The Master and Margarita by Igor Kornelyuk | |

=== With Guerreiro ===
| Season | Original dance | Free dance |
|---|---|---|
| 2008–2009 | Slow foxtrot: C'est Si Bon performed by Louis Armstrong; Swing: Sing, Sing, Sing by Louis Prima | James Bond medley by Monty Norman and John Barry; GoldenEye performed by Tina Turner |
| 2007–2008 | Gulya (from Road of The Gypsies) by Loyko; Yabloko (from Queen of the Gypsies) by Eugen Doga | Perfida by Alberto Dominguez |
| 2006–2007 | Weary Sun by Jerzy Petersburski version by Aleksandr Tsfasman | Spanish Dance by Jose Moren |

== Competitive highlights ==
=== With Vaturi ===
National
| Event | 2014–15 |
|---|---|
| Italian Championships | 4th |

=== With Tkachenko ===
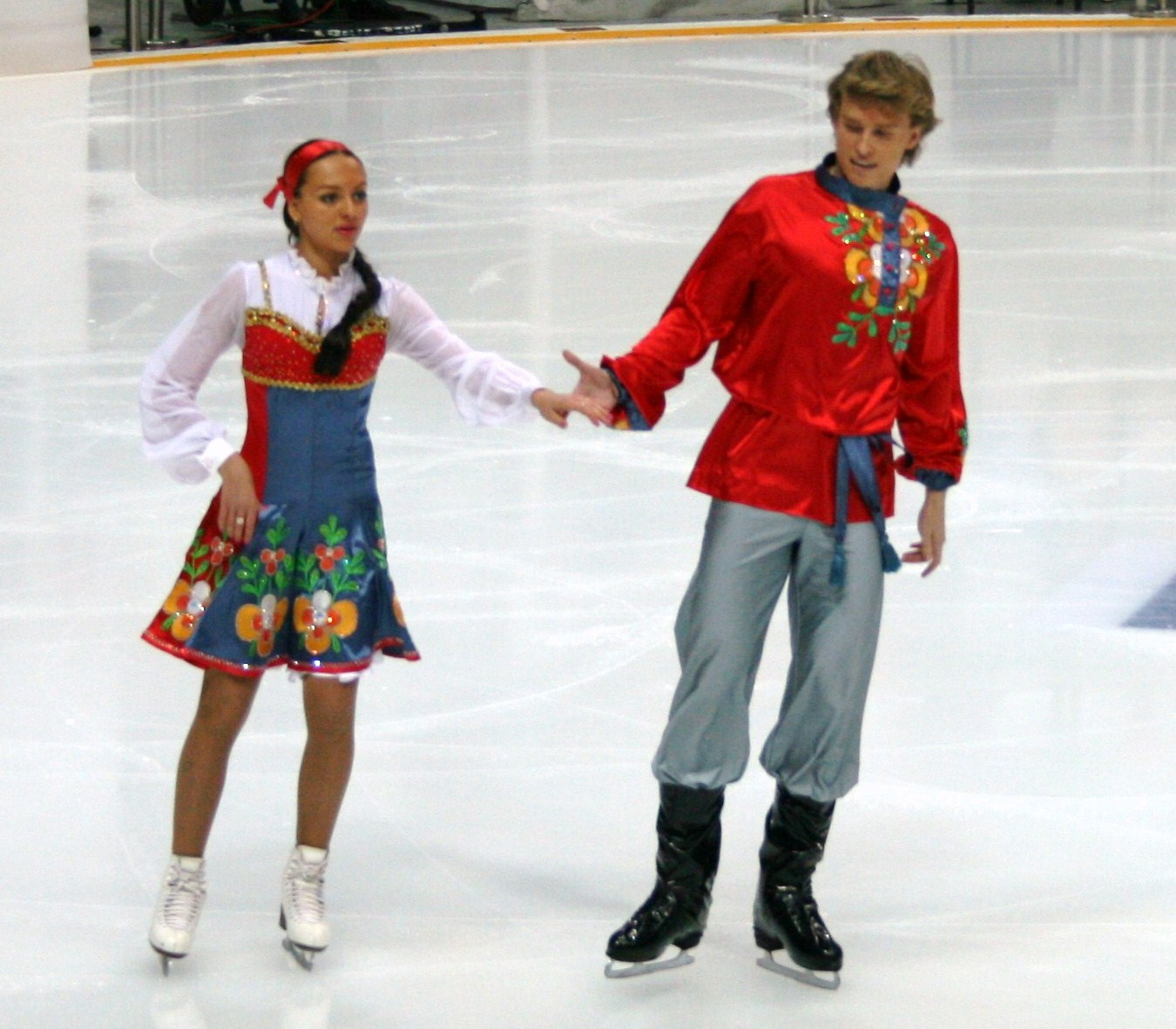
Riazanova and Tkachenko at 2009 Cup of Russia

Results
International
| Event | 2009–10 | 2010–11 | 2011–12 | 2012–13 | 2013–14 |
|---|---|---|---|---|---|
| Worlds | | | 9th | 11th | |
| Europeans | | 6th | 5th | 4th | 5th |
| GP Bompard | | 2nd | | 3rd | |
| GP Rostelecom | 6th | | 4th | | 4th |
| GP Skate America | | 5th | | | |
| GP Skate Canada | | | 5th | 3rd | 4th |
| Nebelhorn | 4th | 3rd | | | |
| Golden Spin | 2nd | | | 1st | |
National
| Russian Champ. | 4th | 2nd | 3rd | 3rd | 4th |

=== With Guerreiro ===
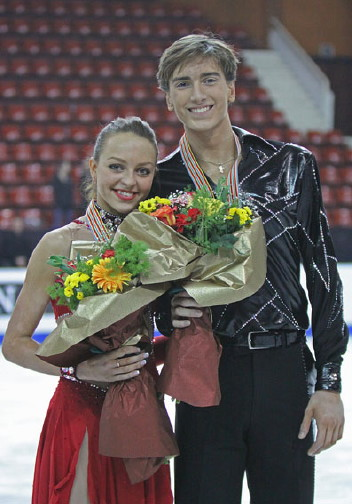
Riazanova with Jonathan Guerreiro at the 2009 Junior Worlds

Results
International: Junior
| Event | 2006–07 | 2007–08 | 2008–09 |
|---|---|---|---|
| World Junior Champ. | | 6th | 3rd |
| JGP Final | | 8th | 3rd |
| JGP Germany | | 2nd | |
| JGP Italy | | | 2nd |
| JGP Romania | 9th | 2nd | |
| JGP Spain | | | 1st |
| NRW Trophy | | | 1st J. |
National
| Russian Junior Champ. | | 3rd | 1st |
