= Tiffany Zahorski =

British-Russian ice dancer

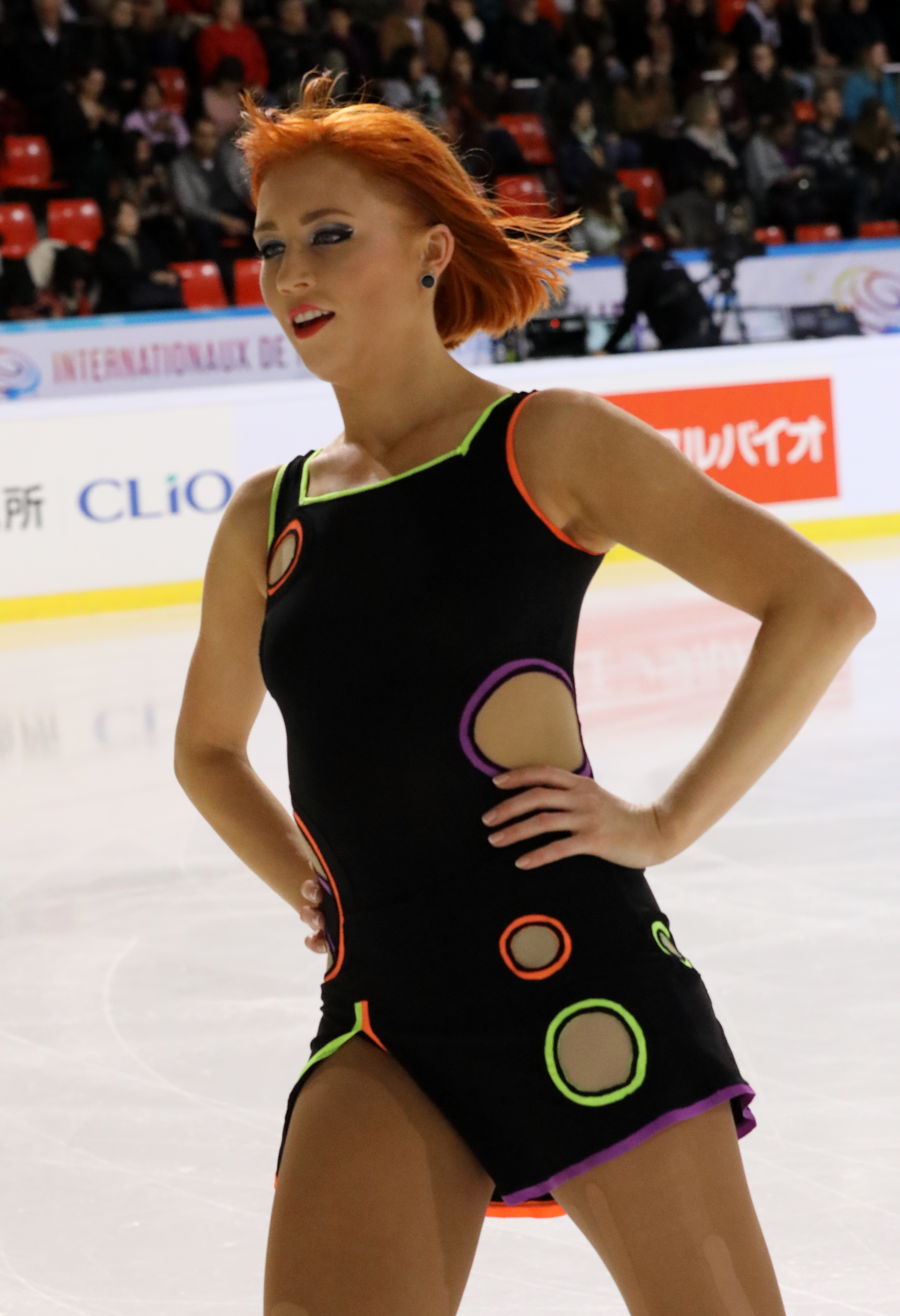
- Zahorski in 2019

Personal information
- Full name: Tiffany Anastasia Zahorski
- Other names: Tiffani Zagorski
- Born: 16 August 1994 (age 31) London, England
- Height: 1.75 m (5 ft 9 in)

Figure skating career
- Country: Russia (since 2015)
- Partner: Jonathan Guerreiro
- Skating club: Moskvich
- Began skating: 1996
- Retired: July 17, 2023

Tiffany Anastasia Zahorski (Russian: Тиффани Анастасия Загорски; born 16 August 1994) is a retired British-Russian ice dancer. Competing with Jonathan Guerreiro for Russia, she is the 2018 NHK Trophy silver medalist, the 2018 Skate America bronze medalist, and a three-time Russian national medalist (2021 silver; 2018, 2020 bronze).

With former partner Alexis Miart, she placed fourth at the 2011 World Junior Championships representing France.

== Personal life ==
Zahorski was born on 16 August 1994 in London, England. She is an only child. Her father, Bohdan Zahorski, trained and subsequently coached at Queens Ice Skating rink in central London until he died on 15 January 2010. One of his early coaches was Gladys Hogg M.B.E.

Her paternal grandfather, Jerzy Dominik Zahorski, was born in Moscow, Russia, in 1917 and was exiled to England in the wake of World War II, in which he served as an RAF pilot. His sister, Elżbieta Maria Zahorska, was taken prisoner in the battle for Warsaw in 1939, escaped and was recaptured when tearing down German propaganda posters. She was sentenced to death and shot by the Germans - in the Germans' first official execution - for her deliberate act of defiance. As she faced the firing squad her last defiant words were "Poland has not yet perished" - which she said in German "Noch ist Polen nicht verloren". She was posthumously awarded the Polish "Cross of Valour".

In late 2012, Zahorski played the role of Vanessa, an ice skater in a French comedy detective film Je fais le mort directed by Jean-Paul Salome, which was released on 11 December 2013.

Zahorski became a French citizen on 19 June 2013 and a Russian citizen in April 2016. She speaks English, French, and Russian.

== Early career ==
Zahorski began skating in 1996 at the age of two. She was taught by her father, Bohdan, in both London and Cardiff until the age of ten, when she moved to Sheffield to train with Jimmy Young. Under Young's tutelage, she became the British Novice Solo Dance Champion in 2005, the British Primary Solo Dance Silver medallist in 2006 and the Lake Placid Novice Solo Dance Bronze medallist in 2007. In September 2007, aged just 13, she relocated with her mother to France to train with Muriel Zazoui and Romain Haguenauer.

In April 2008, Zahorski became the French Novice Solo Dance champion and as a result found her first partner Paul Fieret. After only one competition together, the 2008 French Masters, Fieret retired due to injury.

=== Partnership with Miart ===
Zahorski was partnered with Alexis Miart by Zazoui in March 2009. They placed fourth at the 2011 World Junior Championships, with a second-place finish in the free dance. They elected to compete in the senior ranks the following season. In early July 2011, Miart sustained a fracture to the right malleolus. Zahorski trained alone for two and a half months while he recuperated. They consequently missed the 2011 fall season, but returned to competition in time for the 2012 French Nationals. After winning the bronze medal there, they were named to the French team to the 2012 European Championships. In the preliminary round at Europeans, an aborted lift and both skaters falling on another lift cost them almost twenty points and qualification to the short dance.

Zahorski/Miart received an assignment to the 2012 Trophée Eric Bompard but withdrew. On 9 November 2012, it was confirmed that their partnership had ended and that Zahorski was searching for a new partner.

== Partnership with Guerreiro ==
=== 2014–15 season ===
In June 2014 Zahorski began training with her partner Jonathan Guerreiro, coached by Alexander Zhulin. In July 2014, the Russian Federation asked the French Skating Federation (FFSG) to release her to skate for Russia. They placed fifth at the 2015 Russian Championships.

=== 2015–16 season ===
The FFSG released Zahorski in October 2015, three years and nine months after her last competition for France, allowing Zahorski/Guerreiro to appear for Russia internationally. The two made their international debut at the 2015 Santa Claus Cup, winning the gold medal. They finished fifth at the 2016 Russian Championships.

=== 2016–17 season ===
In the 2016–17 season, Zahorski/Guerreiro won the bronze medal at the 2016 CS Ondrej Nepela Memorial after placing third in both segments and earning a new personal best total score of 165.64 points. They received another bronze medal in their next event, the 2016 CS Finlandia Trophy. They then made their Grand Prix series debut at the 2016 Rostelecom Cup where they placed fifth. A few weeks later they won their third Challenger Series medal of the season, the silver at the 2016 CS Warsaw Cup with a personal best score of 173.02 points.

For the third consecutive year, they finished fifth at the Russian Championships. Zahorski competed in the free dance after developing a fever.

In mid-May 2017 Zahorski/Guerreiro changed coaches to Elena Kustarova and Svetlana Alexeeva

=== 2017–18 season: Pyeongchang Olympics ===
Zahorski/Guerreiro started their season by winning the silver medal at the 2017 CS Minsk-Arena Ice Star. Competing on the Grand Prix series, they placed fourth at the 2017 Cup of China and sixth at the 2017 Skate America.

In December 2017 they won the bronze medal at the 2018 Russian Championships. A month later they placed 6th at the 2018 European Championships after placing eighth in the short dance and sixth in the free dance.

it was announced by the Russian Figure Skating Federation on 23 January 2018 that Ivan Bukin was not invited to the 2018 Winter Olympics. Because of this, Zahorski/Guerreiro were sent instead. Zahorski/Guerreiro placed thirteenth at the 2018 Winter Olympics. Later they placed eighth at the 2018 World Championships with a personal best score of 180.42 points.

=== 2018–19 season ===
Zahorski suffered from a recurrence of a knee injury over the summer that limited the duo's training time leading up to the new season. Zahorski/Guerreiro started their season at the 2018 Skate America. They ranked third in the rhythm dance and fourth in the free dance, placing third overall. The bronze medal was their first Grand Prix medal. Guerreiro said: "We haven't had this many free dance run-throughs under our belts, so we just kind of prayed and hoped for the best. Overall, it's a good start." In early November Zahorski/Guerreiro competed at their second Grand Prix event of the season, the 2018 NHK Trophy, where they won the silver medal with a personal best score of 183.05 points.

With one Grand Prix silver medal and one bronze medal they qualified for the 2018–19 Grand Prix Final, where they finished fifth.

At the 2019 Russian Championships, Zahorski/Guerreiro placed third in the rhythm dance, several points behind the top two teams but more than three points ahead of fourth-place finishers Sofia Evdokimova / Egor Bazin. The team had major problems in the free dance, with Guerreiro's boot laces coming undone early on, and Zahorski making errors on both her twizzles and the one-foot step sequence. Consequently, they dropped to seventh place in the free dance and overall, and were not named to the Russian team to the European Championships.

=== 2019–20 season ===
Zahorski tore the meniscus in her knee late in the summer, causing the team to lose significant training time.

Zahorski/Guerreiro debuted their programs at the Russian test skates, citing their "Survivor" free dance as having been chosen to differentiate themselves from the prevailing lyrical style of skating. They did not compete a Challenger event, and made their return to the Grand Prix at 2019 Skate America, where they placed fifth. They were fifth as well at the 2019 Internationaux de France.

Competing at the 2020 Russian Championships, Zahorski/Guerreiro placed third in the rhythm dance. Third in the free dance as well, they returned to the national podium as bronze medalists. Zahorski said "before this competition, we actually got in training. We had a good two and a half weeks of training, so hopefully, going into Europeans, we'll add more and it will be much better." At the 2020 European Championships, they placed fourth in the fifth in the rhythm dance, but dropped to sixth place after the free dance. They had been assigned to compete at the World Championships in Montreal, but these were cancelled as a result of the coronavirus pandemic.

=== 2020–21 season ===
Zahorski contracted a mild case of COVID-19 in the off-season, but the team nevertheless debuted at the senior test skates. They competed in the third stage of the Cup of Russia series in Sochi, beating Khudaiberdieva/Bazin for gold by 4.02 points.

With the Grand Prix assigned based primarily on geographic location, Zahorski/Guerreiro competed at the 2020 Rostelecom Cup, coming second in the short program. They were second in the free dance as well, taking the silver medal.

Two-time defending national champions Sinitsina/Katsalapov sat out the 2021 Russian Championships, making Zahorski/Guerreiro the presumptive silver medalists behind Stepanova/Bukin. They indeed placed second in both programs, taking another silver medal. While the 2021 European Championships had already been cancelled due to the pandemic, and assignments for the 2021 World Championships other than the national champions were withheld pending later domestic results.

Following the national championships, Zahorski/Guerreiro participated in the 2021 Channel One Trophy, a televised team competition held in lieu of the cancelled European Championships. They were selected for the Red Machine team captained by Alina Zagitova. They placed second in both their segments of the competition, while their team finished in first overall. They did not participate in the Russian Cup Final. They placed tenth at the World Championships.

=== 2021–22 season ===
The team's preparations for the new season were hindered by Guerreiro contracting COVID-19 over the summer. As a result of this, their new free dance was not ready for debut by the Russian test skates, and they performed their rhythm dance twice. They subsequently withdrew from their first Grand Prix assignment, the 2021 Skate America. On 14 October, Guerreiro and Zahorski's coach Svetlana Alekseeva told TASS that Zahorski was in an infectious diseases hospital.

Returning to competition for the 2022 Russian Championships, Zahorski/Guerreiro were fourth in the rhythm dance, 4.60 points behind the newcomers Davis/Smolkin, a result which attracted audible boos from audience members in Saint Petersburg. However, they struggled through the free dance, with Zahorski immediately going to the medical room upon leaving the ice, and dropped to eighth position overall. Guerreiro said afterward "we wanted to fight for a spot on the Olympic team and we knew it would be a hard competition. Tiffany skated well in the rhythm dance, but today it was just physically not possible."

In the fall of 2022, Guerreiro announced that he and Zahorski would take indefinite time off from competing to allow Zahorski to recover from her longstanding illness.

Zahorski/Guerreiro officially announced their retirement on July 17, 2023.

== Programs ==
=== With Guerreiro ===
| Season | Rhythm dance | Free dance | Exhibition |
|---|---|---|---|
| 2021–22 | Jogi by Panjabi MC; Buzz by Aastha Gill, feat. Badshah choreo. by Elena Kustarova and Olga Riabinina | Toxic; Smoke on the Water performed by 2WEI choreo. by Christopher Dean | |
| 2019–21 | March: The Greatest Show; Quickstep: From Now On; Waltz: Tightrope performed by Michelle Williams; March: The Greatest Show (from The Greatest Showman) by Benj Pasek & Justin Paul | Survivor: (Epic Cover) by 2WEI | All I Want for Christmas Is You by Mariah Carey |
| 2018–19 | Tango: Bésame Mucho; Tango: Selection by Astor Piazzolla | Blues for Klook by Eddy Louiss | |
| | Short dance | | |
| 2017–18 | Samba: Hip Hip Chin Chin performed by Club des Belugas; Rhumba: Volveras performed by Gloria Estefan; Samba: Batucada Brasiliera performed by Samba Brazilian Batucada Band | Muse medley: Exogenesis Symphony Part III; Exogenesis Symphony Part II; Ruled by Secrecy | You are beautiful by Joe Cocker |
| 2016–17 | Blues: Nasty Naughty Boy by Christina Aguilera; Swing: All night long by Parov Stelar | Nocturne; Bohemian Rhapsody by Queen | Wicked Game by Gemma Hayes; Valse triste by Jean Sibelius |
| 2015–16 | The Nutcracker Waltz by Pyotr Ilyich Tchaikovsky; Pizzicato Polka by Josef Strauss, Johann Strauss II; The Great Gatsby soundtrack | Nocturne; Bohemian Rhapsody by Queen | The Nutcracker Waltz by Pyotr Ilyich Tchaikovsky; Pizzicato Polka by Josef Strauss, Johann Strauss II |
| 2014–15 | Paso doble | Amélie by Yann Tiersen | |

=== With Miart ===
| Season | Short dance | Free dance | Exhibition |
|---|---|---|---|
| 2011–12 | Marcia Baila by Les Rita Mitsouko | Grease; Summer Nights; Hopelessly Devoted to You; You're the One That I Want | |
| 2010–11 | Viennese waltz: J'envoie Valser by Zazie | I like it like that by Pete Rodriguez; Ain't No Sunshine by Bill Withers; Mujer Latina by Thalia | The Fifth Element by Éric Serra |
| | Original dance | | |
| 2009–10 | Folk dance: Flamenco medley | The Fifth Element by Éric Serra | |

== Competitive highlights ==
GP: Grand Prix; CS: Challenger Series; JGP: Junior Grand Prix

=== With Guerreiro for Russia ===
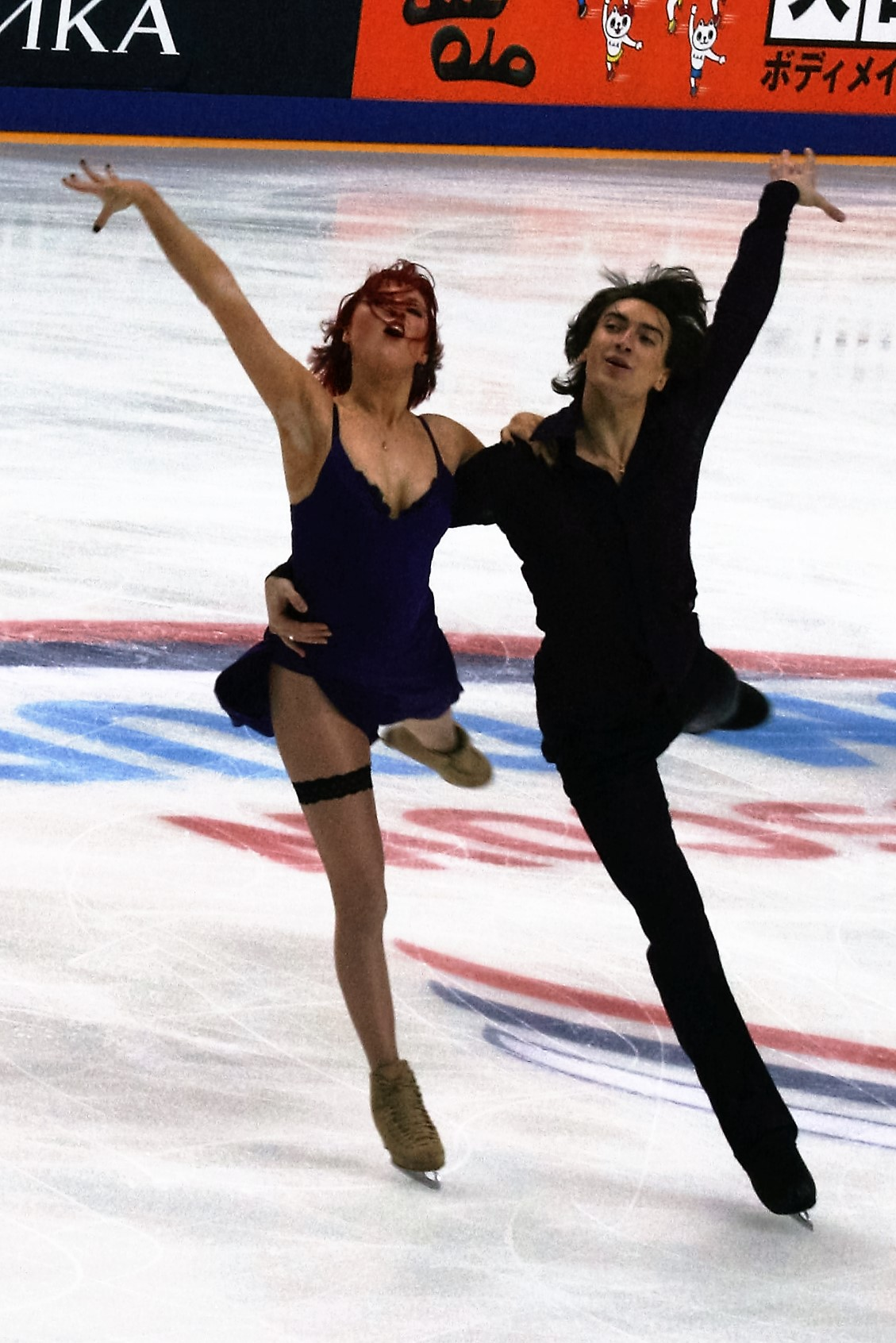
Zahorski and Guerreiro at the 2016 Rostelecom Cup

International
| Event | 14–15 | 15–16 | 16–17 | 17–18 | 18–19 | 19–20 | 20–21 | 21–22 |
|---|---|---|---|---|---|---|---|---|
| Olympics | | | | 13th | | | | |
| Worlds | | | | 8th | | C | 10th | |
| Europeans | | | | 6th | | 6th | | |
| GP Final | | | | | 5th | | | |
| GP Cup of China | | | | 4th | | | | |
| GP France | | | | | | 5th | | WD |
| GP NHK Trophy | | | | | 2nd | | | |
| GP Rostelecom | | | 5th | | | | 2nd | |
| GP Skate America | | | | 6th | 3rd | 5th | | WD |
| CS Finlandia | | | 3rd | | | | | |
| CS Golden Spin | | | | 6th | | | | |
| CS Ice Star | | | | 2nd | | | | |
| CS Nepela Memorial | | | 3rd | | | | | |
| CS Warsaw Cup | | | 2nd | | | | | |
| Santa Claus Cup | | 1st | | | | | | |
| Warsaw Cup | | | | | 1st | | | |
National
| Russian Champ. | 5th | 5th | 5th | 3rd | 7th | 3rd | 2nd | 8th |
| Russian Cup Final | | 1st | 1st | | 1st | | | |
TBD = Assigned; WD = Withdrew; C = Event cancelled

=== With Miart for France ===
International
| Event | 2009–10 | 2010–11 | 2011–12 | 2012–13 |
|---|---|---|---|---|
| Europeans | | | 9th PR | |
| GP Bompard | | | WD | WD |
| Nebelhorn Trophy | | | | WD |
| Trophy of Lyon | | 2nd J. | 1st | |
International: Junior
| Junior Worlds | | 4th | | |
| JGP Belarus | 10th | | | |
| JGP Czech Rep. | | 2nd | | |
| JGP Romania | | 4th | | |
| NRW Trophy | 5th J. | 1st J. | | |
National
| French Champ. | 4th J. | 3rd J. | 3rd | |
| Masters | 4th J. | 3rd J. | | |
| Spanish Champ. | 3rd J. G | | | |
A = Alternate; G = Guest; J = Junior level PR = Preliminary round; WD = Withdrew

== Detailed results ==
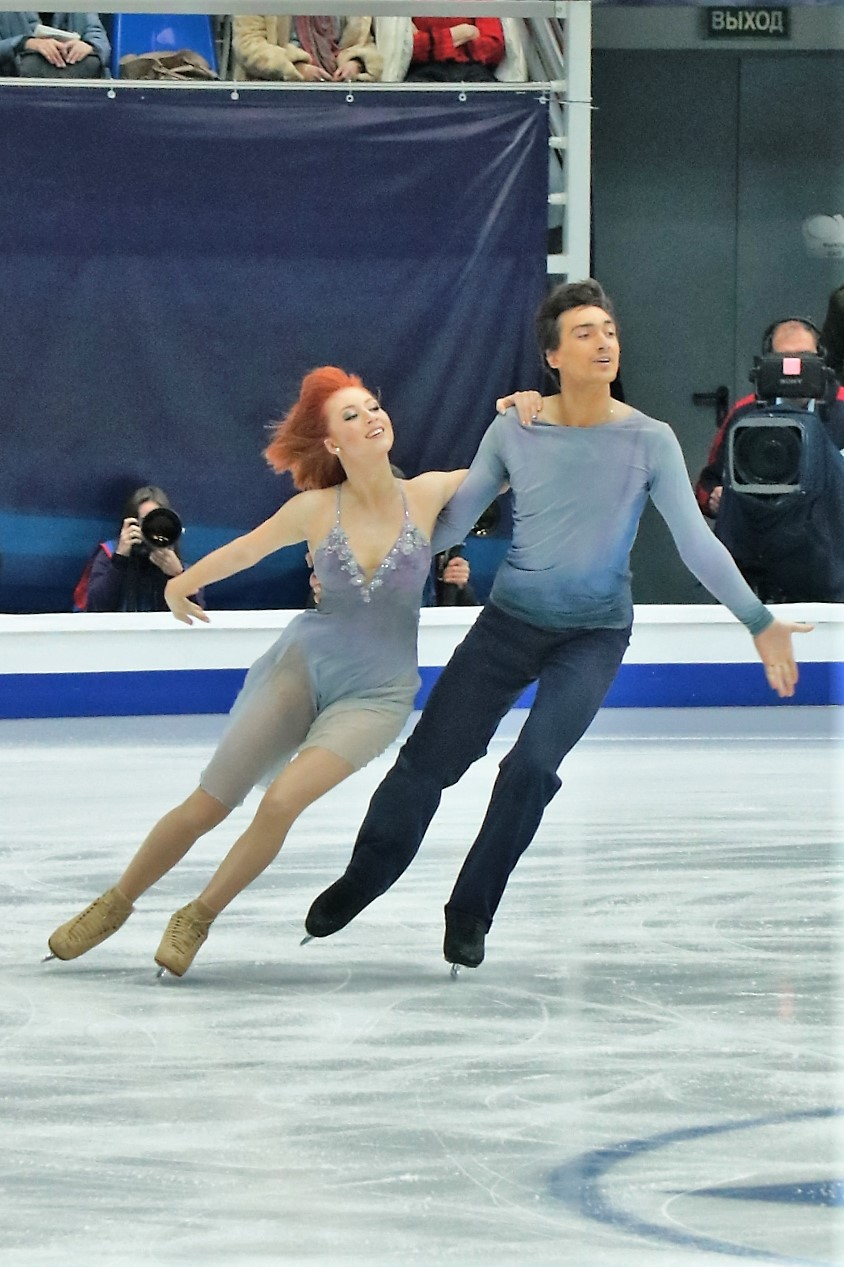
Zahorski and Guerreiro at the 2018 European Championships

Small medals for short and free programs awarded only at ISU Championships. At team events, medals awarded for team results only.

With Guerreiro

2021–22 season
| Date | Event | RD | FD | Total |
| 21–26 December 2021 | 2022 Russian Championships | 4; 79.36 | 9; 100.14 | 8; 179.50 |
2020–21 season
| Date | Event | RD | FD | Total |
| 22–28 March 2021 | 2021 World Championships | 10; 75.58 | 10; 112.87 | 10; 188.45 |
| 5–7 February 2021 | 2021 Channel One Trophy | 2; 85.76 | 2; 128.05 | 1T/2P; 213.81 |
| 23–27 December 2020 | 2021 Russian Championships | 2; 84.02 | 2; 126.92 | 2; 210.94 |
| 20–22 November 2020 | 2020 Rostelecom Cup | 2; 84.46 | 2; 122.45 | 2; 206.91 |
| 23–27 October 2020 | 2020 Cup of Russia Series, 3rd Stage, Sochi domestic competition | 1; 80.64 | 1; 120.38 | 1; 201.02 |
2019–20 season
| Date | Event | RD | FD | Total |
| 20–26 January 2020 | 2020 European Championships | 5; 75.10 | 6; 112.93 | 6; 188.03 |
| 24–29 December 2019 | 2020 Russian Championships | 3; 77.38 | 3; 120.35 | 3; 197.73 |
| 1–3 November 2019 | 2019 Internationaux de France | 5; 75.05 | 5; 109.39 | 5; 184.44 |
| 18–20 October 2019 | 2019 Skate America | 5; 71.18 | 5; 110.64 | 5; 181.82 |
2018–19 season
| Date | Event | RD | FD | Total |
| 19–23 December 2018 | 2019 Russian Championships | 3; 73.37 | 7; 98.39 | 7; 171.76 |
| 6–9 December 2018 | 2018–19 Grand Prix Final | 5; 72.98 | 6; 111.39 | 5; 184.37 |
| 23–25 November 2018 | 2018 Warsaw Cup | 1; 74.85 | 1; 112.55 | 1; 187.40 |
| 9–11 November 2018 | 2018 NHK Trophy | 1; 75.49 | 4; 107.56 | 2; 183.05 |
| 19–21 October 2018 | 2018 Skate America | 3; 73.30 | 4; 108.08 | 3; 181.38 |
2017–18 season
| Date | Event | SD | FD | Total |
| 19–25 March 2018 | 2018 World Championships | 8; 72.45 | 8; 107.97 | 8; 180.42 |
| 14–25 February 2018 | 2018 Winter Olympics | 13; 66.47 | 14; 95.77 | 13; 162.24 |
| 15–21 January 2018 | 2018 European Championships | 8; 65.35 | 6; 103.10 | 6; 168.45 |
| 21–24 December 2017 | 2018 Russian Championships | 3; 71.52 | 4; 104.26 | 3; 175.78 |
| 6–9 December 2017 | 2017 CS Golden Spin of Zagreb | 6; 62.92 | 6; 94.92 | 6; 157.84 |
| 24–26 November 2017 | 2017 Skate America | 4; 64.20 | 6; 96.08 | 6; 160.28 |
| 3–5 November 2017 | 2017 Cup of China | 4; 67.62 | 4; 96.79 | 4; 164.41 |
| 26–29 October 2017 | 2017 CS Minsk-Arena Ice Star | 2; 67.99 | 2; 101.82 | 2; 169.81 |
2016–17 season
| Date | Event | SD | FD | Total |
| 20–26 December 2016 | 2017 Russian Championships | 5; 69.01 | 5; 100.45 | 5; 169.46 |
| 17–20 November 2016 | 2016 CS Warsaw Cup | 2; 69.06 | 2; 103.96 | 2; 173.02 |
| 4–6 November 2016 | 2016 Rostelecom Cup | 5; 64.28 | 5; 92.67 | 5; 156.95 |
| 6–10 October 2016 | 2016 CS Finlandia Trophy | 3; 62.27 | 4; 90.73 | 3; 153.00 |
| 30 September – 2 October 2016 | 2016 CS Ondrej Nepela Memorial | 3; 68.04 | 3; 97.60 | 3; 165.64 |
2015–16 season
| Date | Event | SD | FD | Total |
| 23–27 December 2015 | 2016 Russian Championships | 5; 61.30 | 5; 98.30 | 5; 159.60 |
| 28–30 November 2015 | 2015 Santa Claus Cup | 1; 57.97 | 1; 93.50 | 1; 151.47 |
2014–15 season
| Date | Event | SD | FD | Total |
| 24–28 December 2014 | 2015 Russian Championships | 5; 59.62 | 5; 85.51 | 5; 145.13 |
