= Elena Kustarova =

Russian ice dancer & coach (born 1976)

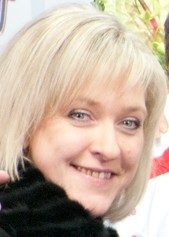
- Kustarova at the 2011 Cup of Russia

Personal information
- Full name: Elena Vladimirovna Kustarova
- Born: 26 July 1976 (age 50) Moscow, Russian SFSR, Soviet Union

Figure skating career
- Country: Russia
- Skating club: Blue Bird FSC
- Retired: 1995
Medal record
Figure skating: Ice dancing
Representing Soviet Union
World Junior Championships
Bronze medal – third place	1991 Budapest	Ice dancing
Silver medal – second place	1990 Colorado Springs	Ice dancing

Elena Vladimirovna Kustarova (Russian: Елена Владимировна Кустарова; born 26 July 1976) is a Russian ice dancing coach and former competitor. She is a two-time (1990, 1991) World Junior medalist with Sergei Romashkin, a two-time (1993, 1994) Russian national medalist with Oleg Ovsyannikov, and the 1995 Russian silver medalist with Vazgen Azroyan.

== Personal life ==
Kustarova was born 26 July 1976 in Moscow. She is the daughter of Svetlana Alexeeva.

== Career ==
=== Competitive ===
Competing with Sergei Romashkin, Kustarova won the silver medal at the 1990 World Junior Championships in Colorado Springs, Colorado and bronze at the 1991 World Junior Championships in Budapest, Hungary. Ahead of the 1991–92 season, she teamed up with Oleg Ovsyannikov. The two won bronze medals at the 1992 Grand Prix International de Paris and the 1993 Nations Cup, as well as two medals at the Russian Nationals. The partnership ended in 1994. Kustarova then partnered with Vazgen Azroyan. They won the silver medal at Russian Nationals but finished 17th at the 1995 European Championships and split at the end of the season.

=== As coach and choreographer ===
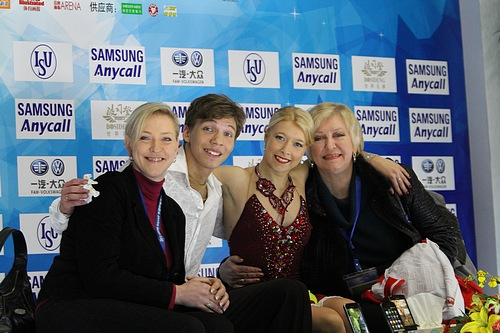
Kustarova (far left) with Ekaterina Bobrova and Dmitri Soloviev and Svetlana Alexeeva (far right)

Kustarova worked for three years as a choreographer in France and then returned to Russia in 2001. She began coaching alongside Svetlana Alexeeva. In the summer of 2006, they moved to Blue Bird FSC in Moscow and then to a new rink in Medvedkovo in the summer of 2012.

Kustarova works in collaboration with Svetlana Alexeeva and Olga Riabinina. Her current students include (years coached in brackets):

- Diana Davis / Gleb Smolkin.
- Polina Ivanenko / Daniil Karpov.
- Irina Shtork / Taavi Rand.
- Anastasia Skoptsova / Kirill Aleshin (c. 2013 — present), 2018 World Junior champions.
- Tiffany Zahorski / Jonathan Guerreiro (2017 — present).

Her former students include:

- Ekaterina Bobrova / Dmitri Soloviev (2000 — April 2012), 2011–12 European silver medalists.
- Maria Borounov / Evgeni Borounov.
- Elena Ilinykh / Ruslan Zhiganshin (2014 — 2016), 2015 Russian national champions.
- Ksenia Monko / Kirill Khaliavin (2009 — February 2012), 2011 World Junior champions.
- Anna Nagornyuk / Viktor Kovalenko (2011 — 2013).
- Anastasia Platonova / Alexander Grachev (2007 — 2009).
- Ekaterina Riazanova / Jonathan Guerreiro (2006 — 2009), 2009 World Junior bronze medalists.
- Ekaterina Rubleva / Ivan Shefer (? — 2006).
- Victoria Sinitsina / Ruslan Zhiganshin (c. 2008 — April 2014), 2012 World Junior champions.
- Anna Yanovskaya / Sergey Mozgov (2011 — 2016), 2015 World Junior champions.
- Nelli Zhiganshina / Alexander Gazsi.
- Julia Zlobina / Alexei Sitnikov (2009 — 2011).

== Competitive highlights ==
=== With Azroyan ===
International
Event	1994–95
European Championships	17th
National
Russian Championships	2nd

=== With Ovsyannikov ===
International
Event	1991–92	1992–93	1993–94
International de Paris		3rd	
Nations Cup			3rd
Piruetten			3rd
National
Russian Championships		2nd	3rd
Soviet Championships	4th		

=== With Romashkin ===
Event	1989–90	1990–91
World Junior Championships	2nd	3rd
