= 2015 Russian Figure Skating Championships =

- Type: National championship
- Date: 24–28 December 2014 (S); 4–7 February 2015 (J)
- Season: 2014–15
- Location: Sochi (S); Yoshkar-Ola (J)
- Host: Figure Skating Federation of Russia
- Venue: Iceberg Skating Palace

Champions
- Men's singles: Maxim Kovtun (S); Alexander Petrov (J)
- Ladies' singles: Elena Radionova (S); Evgenia Medvedeva (J)
- Pairs: Ksenia Stolbova / Fedor Klimov (S); Maria Vigalova / Egor Zakroev (J)
- Ice dance: Elena Ilinykh / Ruslan Zhiganshin (S); Anna Yanovskaya / Sergey Mozgov (J)
- Previous: 2014 Russian Championships
- Next: 2016 Russian Championships

The 2015 Russian Figure Skating Championships (Russian: Чемпионат России по фигурному катанию на коньках 2015) was held from 24 to 28 December 2014 in Sochi. Medals were awarded in the disciplines of men's singles, ladies' singles, pair skating, and ice dancing. The results were among the criteria used to select Russia's teams sent to the 2015 World Championships and 2015 European Championships.

== Competitions ==
Date	Event	Type	Location	Details
9–13 September 2014	1st stage of Russian Cup	Qualifier	Samara, Samara Oblast	Details
6–10 October 2014	2nd stage of Russian Cup	Qualifier	Yoshkar-Ola, Mari El	Details
27–31 October 2014	3rd stage of Russian Cup	Qualifier	Sochi, Krasnodar Krai	Details
18–22 November 2014	4th stage of Russian Cup	Qualifier	Kazan, Tatarstan	Details
2–6 December 2014	5th stage of Russian Cup	Qualifier	Moscow	Details
24–28 December 2014	2015 Russian Championships	Final	Sochi, Krasnodar Krai	Details
4–7 February 2015	2015 Russian Junior Championships	Final	Yoshkar-Ola, Mari El	Details
24–28 February 2015	2015 Russian Cup Final	Final	Saransk, Mordovia	Details
19–23 March 2015	2015 Russian Youth Championships – Younger Age	Final	Veliky Novgorod, Novgorod Oblast	Details
28–31 March 2015	2015 Russian Youth Championships – Elder Age	Final	Stary Oskol, Belgorod Oblast	Details

== Medalists of most important competitions ==
Senior Championships
Discipline	Gold	Silver	Bronze
Men	Maxim Kovtun	Sergei Voronov	Adian Pitkeev
Ladies	Elena Radionova	Elizaveta Tuktamysheva	Evgenia Medvedeva
Pairs	Ksenia Stolbova / Fedor Klimov	Evgenia Tarasova / Vladimir Morozov	Yuko Kavaguti / Alexander Smirnov
Ice dancing	Elena Ilinykh / Ruslan Zhiganshin	Ksenia Monko / Kirill Khaliavin	Alexandra Stepanova / Ivan Bukin
Junior Championships
Discipline	Gold	Silver	Bronze
Men	Alexander Petrov	Alexander Samarin	Dmitri Aliev
Ladies	Evgenia Medvedeva	Maria Sotskova	Serafima Sakhanovich
Pairs	Maria Vigalova / Egor Zakroev	Lina Fedorova / Maxim Miroshkin	Anastasia A. Gubanova / Alexei Sintsov
Ice dancing	Anna Yanovskaya / Sergey Mozgov	Betina Popova / Yuri Vlasenko	Sofia Evdokimova / Egor Bazin
Cup Final
Discipline	Gold	Silver	Bronze
Men	Gordei Gorshkov	Anton Shulepov	Andrei Lazukin
Ladies	Alexandra Proklova	Elizaveta Iushenko	Alena Leonova
Pairs	Kristina Astakhova / Alexei Rogonov	Vasilisa Davankova / Alexander Enbert	Vera Bazarova / Andrei Deputat
Ice dancing	Evgenia Kosigina / Nikolai Moroshkin	Liudmila Sosnitskaia / Pavel Golovishnikov	Margarita Belyakova / Dmitry Volkov
Junior men	Vladislav Tarasenko	Evgeni Ilyn	Ilia Skirda
Junior ladies	Polina Tsurskaya	Anastasiia Gubanova	Alisa Fedichkina
Junior pairs	Daria Beklemisheva / Maxim Bobrov	Alina Solovieva / Viktor Kudriavtsev	Anastasia Poluianova / Stepan Korotkov
Junior ice dancing	Alla Loboda / Pavel Drozd	Ksenia Konkina / Georgy Reviya	Sofia Polishchuk / Alexander Vakhnov
Youth Championships – Elder Age
Discipline	Gold	Silver	Bronze
Men	Evgeni Semenenko	Ilia Skirda	Georgy Kunitsa
Ladies	Polina Tsurskaya	Alisa Fedichkina	Alina Solovyeva
Pairs	Apollinaria Panfilova / Maksim Selkin	Elena Ivanova / Tahir Khakimov	Ekaterina Borisova / Dmitry Sopot
Ice dancing	Anastasia Skoptsova / Kirill Aleshin	Daria Shirokhova / Nikita Nazarov	Yulia Dolgikh / Dmitry Mikhailov
Youth Championships – Younger Age
Discipline	Gold	Silver	Bronze
Men	Petr Gumennik	Evgeni Semenenko	Ilia Skirda
Ladies	Anastasiia Gubanova	Alina Solovyeva	Ekaterina Mitrofanova
Pairs	No pairs' discipline		
Ice dancing	No Ice dancing discipline		

== Senior Championships ==
The senior Championships was held in Sochi for the third year in a row. Competitors qualified through international success or by competing in the Russian Cup series' senior-level events. 2014 national champions Adelina Sotnikova and Ekaterina Bobrova / Dmitri Soloviev were absent from the entry list, which featured 18 men, 18 ladies, 11 pairs, and 10 dance teams.

=== Schedule ===
- Thursday, December 25
  - 14:00–16:30 Men's short
  - 16:45–17:30 Opening ceremony
  - 17:45–19:45 Pairs' short
  - 20:00–21:30 Short dance
- Friday, December 26
  - 14:00–16:30 Ladies' short
  - 16:45–19:45 Men's free
  - 20:00–21:45 Free dance
- Saturday, December 27
  - 15:00–17:15 Pairs' free
  - 17:30–20:20 Ladies' free
- Sunday, December 28
  - 13:00–13:45 Medal ceremonies
  - 14:00–16:30 Exhibitions

=== Results ===
==== Men ====
Rank	Name	Total points	SP		FS	
1	Maxim Kovtun	271.52	1	98.14	2	173.38
2	Sergei Voronov	270.53	3	91.24	1	179.29
3	Adian Pitkeev	240.96	4	87.36	3	153.60
4	Konstantin Menshov	237.27	2	92.37	5	144.90
5	Gordei Gorshkov	228.56	7	75.29	4	153.27
6	Artur Gachinski	222.07	5	80.69	7	141.38
7	Anton Shulepov	208.34	11	66.48	6	141.86
8	Moris Kvitelashvili	207.40	8	74.37	9	133.03
9	Alexander Petrov	205.87	6	76.87	10	129.00
10	Dmitri Aliev	204.46	12	64.36	8	140.10
11	Alexander Samarin	187.87	9	72.05	14	115.82
12	Artem Lezheev	186.25	13	63.01	11	123.24
13	Andrei Lazukin	181.66	10	70.92	17	110.74
14	Daniil Bernadiner	177.40	16	59.21	12	118.19
15	Roman Galkin	175.42	14	61.47	15	113.95
16	Vladislav Kainov	175.25	17	57.54	13	117.71
17	Evgeni Vlasov	163.37	18	50.70	16	112.67
WD	Artur Dmitriev Jr.	withdrew	15	60.82	withdrew from competition	

==== Ladies ====
Rank	Name	Total points	SP		FS	
1	Elena Radionova	217.45	1	74.13	1	143.32
2	Elizaveta Tuktamysheva	212.35	2	73.62	2	138.73
3	Evgenia Medvedeva	209.81	3	72.57	3	137.24
4	Anna Pogorilaya	204.51	4	71.17	4	133.34
5	Serafima Sakhanovich	191.84	11	59.21	5	132.63
6	Maria Sotskova	186.06	8	61.66	6	124.40
7	Alena Leonova	184.33	5	67.99	7	116.34
8	Maria Artemieva	175.33	9	60.59	8	114.74
9	Yulia Lipnitskaya	169.70	6	66.90	11	102.80
10	Natalia Ogoreltseva	160.92	7	62.98	14	97.94
11	Maria Stavitskaia	160.85	12	58.09	12	102.76
12	Alexandra Proklova	160.08	15	51.85	9	108.23
13	Diana Pervushkina	152.67	16	50.17	13	102.50
14	Ekaterina Bayanova	151.25	14	53.70	15	97.55
15	Alsu Kaiumova	148.76	18	44.86	10	103.90
16	Elizaveta Iushenko	145.04	10	60.11	17	84.93
17	Maria Gorokhova	142.31	17	45.51	16	96.80
18	Polina Korobeynikova	141.39	13	57.68	18	83.71

==== Pairs ====
Rank	Name	Total points	SP		FS	
1	Ksenia Stolbova / Fedor Klimov	212.10	1	75.72	2	136.38
2	Evgenia Tarasova / Vladimir Morozov	208.23	3	70.29	1	137.94
3	Yuko Kavaguti / Alexander Smirnov	207.68	2	71.81	3	135.87
4	Kristina Astakhova / Alexei Rogonov	174.52	6	57.63	4	116.89
5	Vera Bazarova / Andrei Deputat	172.73	4	60.98	6	111.75
6	Vasilisa Davankova / Alexander Enbert	171.60	7	54.84	5	116.76
7	Natalja Zabijako / Yuri Larionov	166.03	5	59.96	7	106.07
8	Arina Cherniavskaia / Antonio Souza-Kordeyru	155.10	8	52.22	8	102.88
9	Anastasia A. Gubanova / Alexei Sintsov	149.39	9	51.13	10	98.26
10	Tatiana Kuznetsova / Semen Stepanov	142.96	10	43.89	9	99.07

==== Ice dancing ====
Rank	Name	Total points	SD		FD	
1	Elena Ilinykh / Ruslan Zhiganshin	171.41	1	70.35	2	101.06
2	Ksenia Monko / Kirill Khaliavin	167.19	3	65.72	1	101.47
3	Alexandra Stepanova / Ivan Bukin	166.19	2	66.37	3	99.82
4	Victoria Sinitsina / Nikita Katsalapov	158.57	4	60.79	4	97.78
5	Tiffany Zahorski / Jonathan Guerreiro	145.13	5	59.62	5	85.51
6	Evgenia Kosigina / Nikolai Moroshkin	132.84	6	52.76	6	80.08
7	Liudmila Sosnitskaia / Pavel Golovishnikov	112.19	7	43.58	7	68.61
8	Margarita Belyakova / Dmitry Volkov	95.77	8	37.12	9	58.65
9	Anastasia Safronova / Ilia Zimin	92.13	9	32.61	8	59.52
10	Anzhelika Kanivets / Alexei Chizhov	83.49	10	29.95	10	53.54

== Junior Championships ==
The 2015 Russian Junior Championships (Russian: Первенство России) were held in Yoshkar-Ola from 4 to 7 February 2015. Competitors qualified by competing in the Russian Cup series' junior-level events. There were 18 qualifiers in the men's event, 18 ladies, 12 pairs, and 15 ice dancing teams. The results of the February competition was part of the selection criteria for the 2015 World Junior Championships.

=== Results ===
==== Men ====
Rank	Name	Region	Total points	SP		FS	
1	Alexander Petrov	SPB	218.07	1	77.89	2	140.18
2	Alexander Samarin	MOS	209.37	2	76.04	3	133.33
3	Dmitri Aliev	C/K	206.15	11	59.83	1	146.32
4	Vladimir Samoilov	MOS	197.91	5	66.03	4	131.88
5	Petr Gumennik	SPB	196.29	6	65.65	5	130.64
6	Andrei Lazukin	SPB	192.25	3	69.74	7	122.51
7	Ilia Skirda	MOS	189.23	10	61.57	6	127.66
8	Daniil Bernadiner	MOS	179.54	8	62.25	10	117.29
9	Murad Kurbanov	MOS	179.15	9	61.87	11	117.28
10	Nikolai Gerasimov	MOS	179.09	12	59.67	8	119.42
11	Vladislav Tarasenko	MOS	176.38	7	64.36	14	112.02
12	Igor Efimchuk	SPB	175.51	4	67.65	15	107.86
13	Georgy Kunitsa	MOS	174.52	13	58.62	12	115.90
14	Matvei Vetlugin	MOS	174.43	16	55.73	9	118.70
15	Evgeni Ilyn	Kazan	168.54	15	56.21	13	112.33
16	Evgeni Semenenko	SPB	163.25	14	57.88	18	105.37
17	Kirill Sokolov	MOS	160.97	17	54.27	16	106.70
18	Dmitry Shutkov	SPB	155.56	18	49.26	17	106.30

==== Ladies ====
Rank	Name	Region	Total points	SP		FS	
1	Evgenia Medvedeva	MOS	205.05	1	70.95	1	134.10
2	Maria Sotskova	MOS	186.30	2	65.93	3	120.37
3	Serafima Sakhanovich	M / S	185.96	4	62.60	2	123.36
4	Polina Tsurskaya	MOS	182.83	3	64.07	4	118.76
5	Elizaveta Nugumanova	SPB	178.45	5	62.23	6	116.22
6	Anastasiia Gubanova	SPB	178.44	7	60.77	5	117.67
7	Elizaveta Iushenko	MOS	175.33	6	61.26	7	114.07
8	Alisa Fedichkina	SPB	161.27	15	52.18	8	109.09
9	Valeria Mikhailova	MOS	154.78	13	53.22	9	101.56
10	Diana Pervushkina	TOL	152.27	11	53.71	10	98.56
11	Ekaterina Mitrofanova	MOS	151.91	9	55.20	11	96.71
12	Anna Tarusina	MOS	147.74	14	52.71	12	95.03
13	Anastasia Mukhortova	MOS	145.83	12	53.69	14	92.14
14	Alsu Kaiumova	MOS	144.43	10	55.08	15	89.35
15	Maria Perederova	SPB	139.89	16	52.00	16	87.89
16	Sofia Samodurova	SPB	136.06	17	43.54	13	92.52
17	Stanislava Konstantinova	SPB	132.68	8	58.40	17	74.28
WD	Alexandra Proklova	MOS					

==== Pairs ====
Rank	Name	Region	Total points	SP		FS	
1	Maria Vigalova / Egor Zakroev	Perm	171.57	2	60.29	1	111.28
2	Lina Fedorova / Maxim Miroshkin	MOS	164.80	1	61.48	2	103.32
3	Anastasia A. Gubanova / Alexei Sintsov	Perm	152.04	3	54.23	3	97.81
4	Alina Solovieva / Viktor Kudriavtsev	MOS	147.32	5	52.02	4	95.30
5	Daria Beklemisheva / Maxim Bobrov	MOS	146.12	4	53.18	5	92.94
6	Anastasia Poluianova / Stepan Korotkov	Perm	138.33	8	48.30	6	90.03
7	Maria Chuzhanova / Denis Mintsev	MOS	134.22	7	49.89	8	84.33
8	Ekaterina Borisova / Dmitry Sopot	Perm	133.69	6	50.98	11	82.71
9	Elena Ivanova / Tahir Khakimov	Perm	130.70	11	44.63	7	86.07
10	Daria Foka / Evgeniy Kostarev	MOS	130.40	9	47.23	10	83.17
11	Kamilla Gainetdinova / Sergei Alexeev	MOS	130.37	10	47.00	9	83.37
12	Vlada Mishina / Vadim Ivanov	M/K	112.28	12	42.88	12	69.40

==== Ice dancing ====
Rank	Name	Region	Total points	SD		FD	
1	Anna Yanovskaya / Sergey Mozgov	MOS	163.59	1	65.24	1	98.35
2	Betina Popova / Yuri Vlasenko	MOS	147.99	3	58.06	2	89.93
3	Sofia Evdokimova / Egor Bazin	Togliatti	140.56	5	54.53	3	86.03
4	Alla Loboda / Pavel Drozd	MOS	140.37	2	61.84	5	78.53
5	Anastasia Shpilevaya / Grigory Smirnov	M/H	139.86	4	55.47	4	84.39
6	Eva Khachaturian / Andrei Bagin	MOS	123.79	6	53.14	10	70.65
7	Sofia Shevchenko / Igor Eremenko	MOS	120.32	7	49.39	9	70.93
8	Daria Shirokhova / Nikita Nazarov	MOB	120.06	8	47.05	8	73.01
9	Anastasia Skoptsova / Kirill Aleshin	MOS	120.01	9	46.79	7	73.22
10	Sofia Polishchuk / Alexander Vakhnov	MOS	116.45	12	40.61	6	75.84
11	Yulia Dolgikh / Dmitry Mikhailov	MOS	111.20	10	44.17	11	67.03
12	Daria Rumiantseva / Dmitri Riabchenko	MOS	108.62	11	41.73	12	66.89
13	Karolina Klikich / Daniil Ragimov	Togliatti	100.26	13	38.96	13	61.30
14	Polina Ivanenko / Daniil Karpov	Orenburg	94.11	14	37.38	14	56.73
WD	Ksenia Konkina / Georgy Reviya	MOB					

== International team selections ==
=== Winter Universiade ===
The team for the 2015 Winter Universiade was announced as follows:

	Men	Ladies	Pairs	Ice dancing
1	Artur Gachinski	Maria Artemieva	~~Evgenia Tarasova / Vladimir Morozov~~	~~Victoria Sinitsina / Nikita Katsalapov~~
2	Gordei Gorshkov	Alena Leonova	Vera Bazarova / Andrei Deputat	Evgenia Kosigina / Nikolai Moroshkin
3	Moris Kvitelashvili		Kristina Astakhova / Alexei Rogonov	
1st alt.		Adelina Sotnikova		

=== European Championships ===
The team for the 2015 European Championships was announced on 28 December 2014:

	Men	Ladies	Pairs	Ice dancing
1	Maxim Kovtun	Anna Pogorilaya	Yuko Kavaguti / Alexander Smirnov	Elena Ilinykh / Ruslan Zhiganshin
2	Adian Pitkeev	Elena Radionova	Ksenia Stolbova / Fedor Klimov	Ksenia Monko / Kirill Khaliavin
3	Sergei Voronov	Elizaveta Tuktamysheva	Evgenia Tarasova / Vladimir Morozov	Alexandra Stepanova / Ivan Bukin
1st alt.	Konstantin Menshov	Adelina Sotnikova	Kristina Astakhova / Alexei Rogonov	Victoria Sinitsina / Nikita Katsalapov
2nd alt.	Gordei Gorshkov	Alena Leonova	Vera Bazarova / Andrei Deputat	Ekaterina Bobrova / Dmitri Soloviev
3rd alt.	Artur Gachinski	Maria Artemieva	Tatiana Volosozhar / Maxim Trankov	

=== World Junior Championships ===
The team for the 2015 World Junior Championships was announced on 12 February 2015 in no particular order:

	Men	Ladies	Pairs	Ice dancing
	Alexander Petrov	Evgenia Medvedeva	~~Maria Vigalova / Egor Zakroev~~	Sofia Evdokimova / Egor Bazin
	Adian Pitkeev	Serafima Sakhanovich	Anastasia A. Gubanova / Alexei Sintsov	Betina Popova / Yuri Vlasenko
	Alexander Samarin	Maria Sotskova	Lina Fedorova / Maxim Miroshkin	Anna Yanovskaya / Sergey Mozgov
Alt.	Dmitri Aliev	Elizaveta Iushenko	Daria Beklemisheva / Maxim Bobrov (added)	Alla Loboda / Pavel Drozd
Alt.	Vladimir Samoilov	Alexandra Proklova		Anastasia Shpilevaya / Grigory Smirnov
Alt.	Andrei Lazukin	Diana Pervushkina		Eva Khachaturian / Andrei Bagin

=== World Championships ===
The team for the 2015 World Championships was announced as follows:

	Men	Ladies	Pairs	Ice dancing
1	Maxim Kovtun	Anna Pogorilaya	Kristina Astakhova / Alexei Rogonov	Elena Ilinykh / Ruslan Zhiganshin
2	Sergei Voronov	Elena Radionova	Yuko Kavaguti / Alexander Smirnov	Ksenia Monko / Kirill Khaliavin
3		Elizaveta Tuktamysheva	Evgenia Tarasova / Vladimir Morozov	Alexandra Stepanova / Ivan Bukin
1st alt.	Konstantin Menshov	Alena Leonova	Vera Bazarova / Andrei Deputat	
2nd alt.	Adian Pitkeev			
