= Elena Ilinykh =

Russian ice dancer (born 1994)

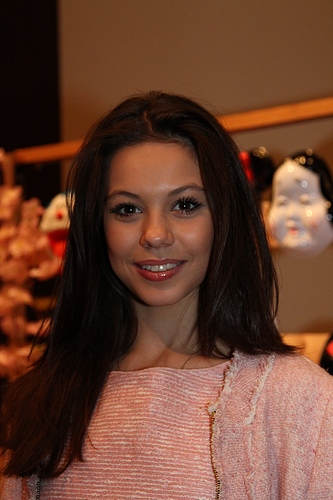
- Ilinykh in 2012

Personal information
- Full name: Elena Ruslanovna Ilinykh
- Other names: Elena Polunin
- Born: 25 April 1994 (age 32) Aktau, Kazakhstan
- Home town: Moscow, Russia
- Height: 1.64 m (5 ft 5 in)
- Spouse: Sergei Polunin (m. 2024)
- Children: 3

Figure skating career
- Country: Russia
- Discipline: Ice dance
- Coach: Elena Kustarova, Svetlana Alexeeva, Olga Riabinina
- Began skating: 1998
- Retired: 2017
Medal record
Figure skating – Ice dance
Representing Russia (with Zhiganshin)
World Team Trophy
Silver medal – second place	2015 Tokyo	Team
Representing Russia (with Katsalapov)
Olympic Games
Gold medal – first place	2014 Sochi	Team
Bronze medal – third place	2014 Sochi	Ice dancing
World Junior Championships
Gold medal – first place	2010 The Hague	Ice dancing
Junior Grand Prix Final
Silver medal – second place	2009–10 Tokyo	Ice dancing

Elena Ruslanovna Ilinykh (Russian: Елена Руслановна Ильиных, married name Polunin, born 25 April 1994) is a Russian former competitive ice dancer. With partner Ruslan Zhiganshin, she is the 2015 Russian national champion.

With former partner Nikita Katsalapov, she is a 2014 Olympic champion in the team event, a 2014 Olympic bronze medalist in ice dancing, a three-time European medalist (silver in 2013 and 2014; bronze in 2012), and the 2010 World Junior champion. Also along with former partner Nikita Katsalapov, she is the second-youngest Olympic ice dance medalist in history and the junior world record holder for the original dance.

== Early life ==
Elena Ilinykh was born in Aktau (Shevchenko), Kazakhstan and raised in Moscow, Russia. Her parents divorced when she was two years old. From around 2006 to 2008, Ilinykh lived in Michigan with her grandmother and became fluent in English. Her mother adopted a two-year-old boy in around 2010.

== Early skating career ==
As a child, Ilinykh trained in single skating, under Natalia Dubinskaya, until her mother decided she should try ice dancing. She was paired with Nikita Katsalapov, who had trained in the same singles group. Irina Lobacheva and Ilia Averbukh were the team's first coaches.

In 2005, Ilinykh/Katsalapov attended a training camp under Alexander Zhulin — who was preparing Tatiana Navka / Roman Kostomarov for their Olympic gold medal-winning season — but split soon after. In 2010, Ilinykh said that they were too young at the time to understand partnership. She left Russia and trained in Marina Zueva and Igor Shpilband's group in Canton, Michigan for two years without a partner.

At some point, she had a brief partnership with Ivan Bukin, the son of 1988 Olympic ice dancing champion Andrei Bukin.

== Renewed partnership with Katsalapov ==
=== Junior career ===
In spring 2008, Ilinykh returned to Moscow after Katsalapov expressed interest in reuniting with her. He organized tryouts with her and other skaters at around the same time before making a final decision.

Ilinykh/Katsalapov rejoined Zhulin and began competing together in the 2008–09 season, placing fourth at the Russian Junior Championships. Their international debut came in the 2009–10 season. After winning gold medals at their Junior Grand Prix events in Budapest and Toruń, they qualified to the JGP Final, where they took the silver medal behind Ksenia Monko / Kirill Khaliavin. Though second also at the Russian Junior Championships, Ilinykh/Katsalapov outscored Monko/Khaliavin for the gold at the 2010 World Junior Championships. They were named Discovery of the Year at the 2010 Crystal Ice Awards held in October 2010 in Moscow.

=== 2010–11 season ===
For the 2010–11 season, Ilinykh/Katsalapov chose a ballet-themed free dance to Don Quixote: "[Zhulin] wanted us to do something classical Russian, and only very few people have done a real ballet program in dance." Ilinykh's tutu was made at the Bolshoi. They made their senior debut at the 2010 NHK Trophy where they finished fourth. At their next event, 2010 Cup of Russia, they won the bronze medal, their first medal on the senior Grand Prix series. At the 2011 Russian Nationals, they were second after the short dance behind Ekaterina Bobrova / Dmitri Soloviev but placed fourth in the free dance to finish third overall behind Ekaterina Riazanova / Ilia Tkachenko. However, their bronze medal was enough to earn them their first berth to the European Championships.

At the 2011 Europeans, Ilinykh/Katsalapov set new personal bests in the short dance (60.93), free dance (92.55) and combined total (153.48) to finish fourth in their debut at the event. They were in a battle with Riazanova/Tkachenko for Russia's second of only two berths to the 2011 World Championships. By finishing ahead of them, Ilinykh/Katsalapov won the right to make their senior Worlds debut. They finished seventh at the event. Following the end of the season, they ended their collaboration with Alexander Zhulin and Oleg Volkov to begin working with new coach Nikolai Morozov in May 2011. During the off-season, they spent some time in the U.S. preparing for the 2011–12 season.

=== 2011–12 season ===
For the 2011–12 Grand Prix season, Ilinykh/Katsalapov were assigned to 2011 NHK Trophy and 2011 Trophée Eric Bompard. At NHK Trophy, they placed first in the short dance but in the warm-up before the free dance Ilinykh crashed into the boards and injured her knee. The couple finished the competition, winning the bronze medal, but withdrew from the exhibitions. Ilinykh/Katsalapov then finished fourth at the 2011 Trophee Eric Bompard. They won the silver medal at the 2012 Russian Championships. At the 2012 European Championships, Ilinykh/Katsalapov were seventh in the short dance but set a personal best in their free dance, resulting in an overall total of 153.12 points. They won the bronze medal at the event and then performed with Art on Ice. Ilinykh/Katsalapov finished 5th—the highest of the three Russian teams—at the 2012 World Championships. Their final event of the season was the 2012 World Team Trophy.

=== 2012–13 season ===
Ilinykh/Katsalapov started their season with gold at the 2012 Crystal Skate of Romania. They won silver at their first 2012–13 Grand Prix event, the 2012 Rostelecom Cup. At the 2012 NHK Trophy, Ilinykh/Katsalapov were third after the short dance. Ilinykh fell ill before the free dance due to food poisoning but went on to compete. They placed second in the segment and won the silver medal. They qualified for the 2012 Grand Prix Final in Sochi, Russia, and finished sixth at the event. At the 2013 Russian Championships, Ilinykh/Katsalapov won the silver medal behind defending national champions Ekaterina Bobrova / Dmitri Soloviev. At the 2013 European Championships, they placed second in the short dance and first in the free dance. They won the silver medal, just 0.11 of a point behind gold medalists Bobrova/Soloviev. Ilinykh/Katsalapov finished 9th at the 2013 World Championships.

=== 2013–14 season ===
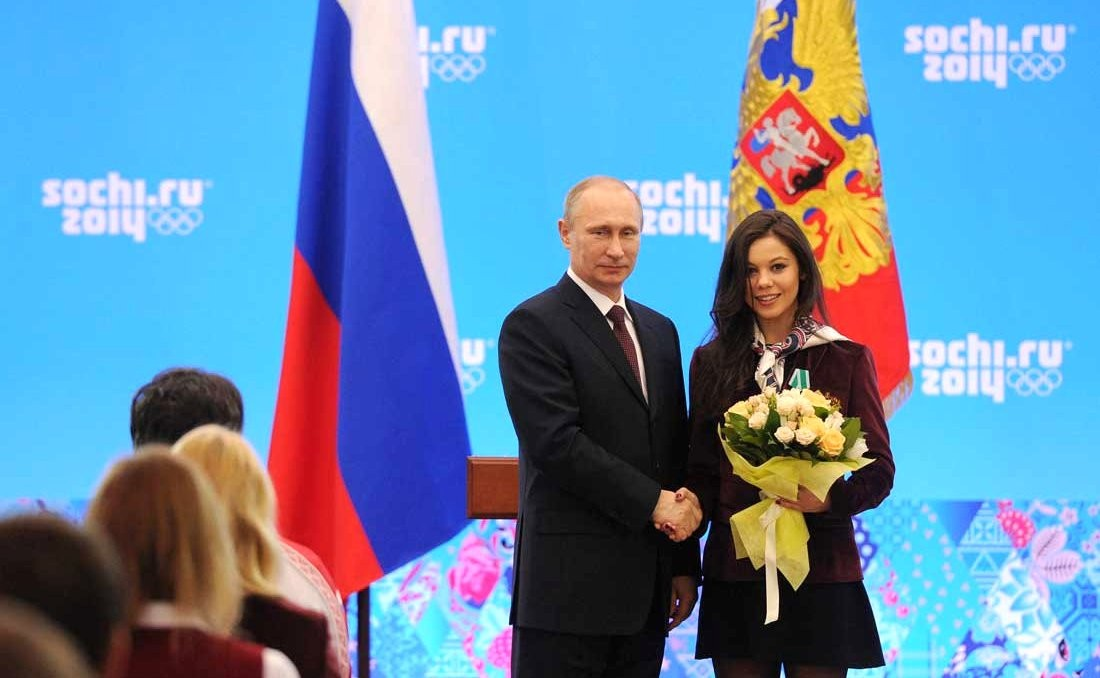
Ilinykh at the awarding ceremony for Russian athletes with President Vladimir Putin

Ilinykh/Katsalapov's first assignment of the 2013–14 Grand Prix season was the 2013 NHK Trophy where they placed fourth. At their next event, the 2013 Trophee Eric Bompard, they scored personal bests in both segments, finishing with an overall score of 171.89 points and winning the silver medal ahead of French ice dancers Nathalie Pechalat / Fabian Bourzat.

Ilinykh/Katsalapov won their third national silver medal at the 2014 Russian Championships behind Bobrova/Soloviev and then won silver at the 2014 European Championships with an overall score 1.1 points less than gold medalists Cappellini/Lanotte. At the 2014 Winter Olympics in Sochi, Ilinykh/Katsalapov were assigned to the free dance in the inaugural team event. They placed third in their segment and Team Russia won the gold medal. Ilinykh/Katsalapov then won the bronze medal in the individual ice dancing event behind champions Meryl Davis / Charlie White and silver medalists Tessa Virtue / Scott Moir. They scored personal bests in both segments and an overall total of 183.48 points. At 19 years of age, Ilinykh is second youngest Olympic ice dance medalist in history after Marina Klimova.

The next month, Ilinykh/Katsalapov traveled to Saitama, Japan for the 2014 World Championships. On 26 March 2014, just before the short dance, ITAR-TASS reported that they would split after the competition. Katsalapov had a serious error on the twizzles and they placed fifth in the short dance. Despite winning the next segment, they finished off the podium in the closely contested event. Their total score was just 1.05 less than the gold medalists. On 4 April 2014, Katsalapov confirmed to Ilinykh that he wanted to end their partnership.

== Partnership with Zhiganshin ==
Soon after, in early April 2014, Ilinykh accepted an invitation from Ruslan Zhiganshin's coaches to try out with their student. Coached by Elena Kustarova in Moscow, Ilinykh/Zhiganshin began training together in an unofficial partnership — the Russian federation having decided to give Ilinykh/Katsalapov time to reconcile — and received approval at the end of May.

=== 2014–15 season ===
For the 2014–15 Grand Prix season, Ilinykh/Zhiganshin were assigned to Cup of China and Rostelecom Cup. Making their international debut, they placed fourth at Cup of China and then won the silver medal behind Americans Madison Chock / Evan Bates at Rostelecom Cup. They qualified for the Grand Prix Final in their first season as a team. At the GPF in Barcelona, they placed sixth in the short dance, fourth in the free dance, and sixth overall. At the 2015 Russian Championships, Ilinykh/Zhiganshin won the national title in their first season as a team.

=== 2015–16 season ===
Ilinykh/Zhiganshin began their season at the Mordovian Ornament, which they won with new personal bests in all segments. For the 2015–16 Grand Prix season, they were once again assigned to Cup of China and Rostelecom Cup. They won the bronze at Cup of China behind Italians Anna Cappellini / Luca Lanotte and Americans Madison Chock / Evan Bates. Their next competition they finished 5th at the 2015 Rostelecom Cup. On 24–27 December, Ilinykh/Zhiganshin competed at the 2016 Russian Championships, where they finished 4th behind Alexandra Stepanova / Ivan Bukin after placing fourth in the short dance and second in the free dance.

Ilinykh/Zhiganshin decided to fly to Michigan on 27 February 2016 to work with Igor Shpilband.

=== 2016–17 season ===
They finished fourth at the 2017 Russian Championships, losing the bronze to Sinisina/Katsalapov by 0.17. They had a one-point deduction after part of their costume fell onto the ice.

== Television ==
Ilinykh appeared in the seventh and ninth season of ice show contest Ice Age.

== Personal life ==
As of 2020, Ilinykh is engaged to ballet dancer Sergei Polunin. On 16 January 2020, their son, Mir, was born in Miami, Florida, U.S. Mir means 'peace' or 'world' in Russian. In April 2022, their second son, Dar, was born. On 25 August 2024, Ilinykh married Polunin after 5 years since the announcement of their engagement. In March 2026, their daughter, Runa, was born.

Ilinykh is a supporter of the 2022 Russian invasion of Ukraine and performed on Russian TV in support of the invasion.

== Programs ==
=== With Zhiganshin ===
Season	Short dance	Free dance	Exhibition
2016–2017	Blues: Big Bad Love by Ray Charles and Diana Ross; Swing: Sing Sing Sing by Louis Prima	Slumdog Millionaire (soundtrack); Ang Laga De by Aditi Paul	
2015–2016	Waltz: Queen medley: Somebody to Love; We Will Rock You choreo. by Alexey Arapov	Frida by Elliot Goldenthal choreo. by Antonio Najarro	I Put a Spell on You performed by Annie Lennox
2014–2015	Pasodoble: Carmen Suite: Aragonaise; Torrero choreo. by Antonio Najarro by Georges Bizet	Appassionata by Secret Garden; Anthony and Cleopatra Theme (from "Cleopatra") by Ferrante & Teicher choreo. by Ilia Averbukh	Je T'aime by Lara Fabian; Love Like A Dream by Alla Pugacheva

=== With Katsalapov ===
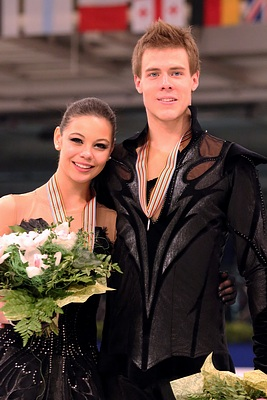
Ilinykh and Katsalapov at the 2014 European Championships

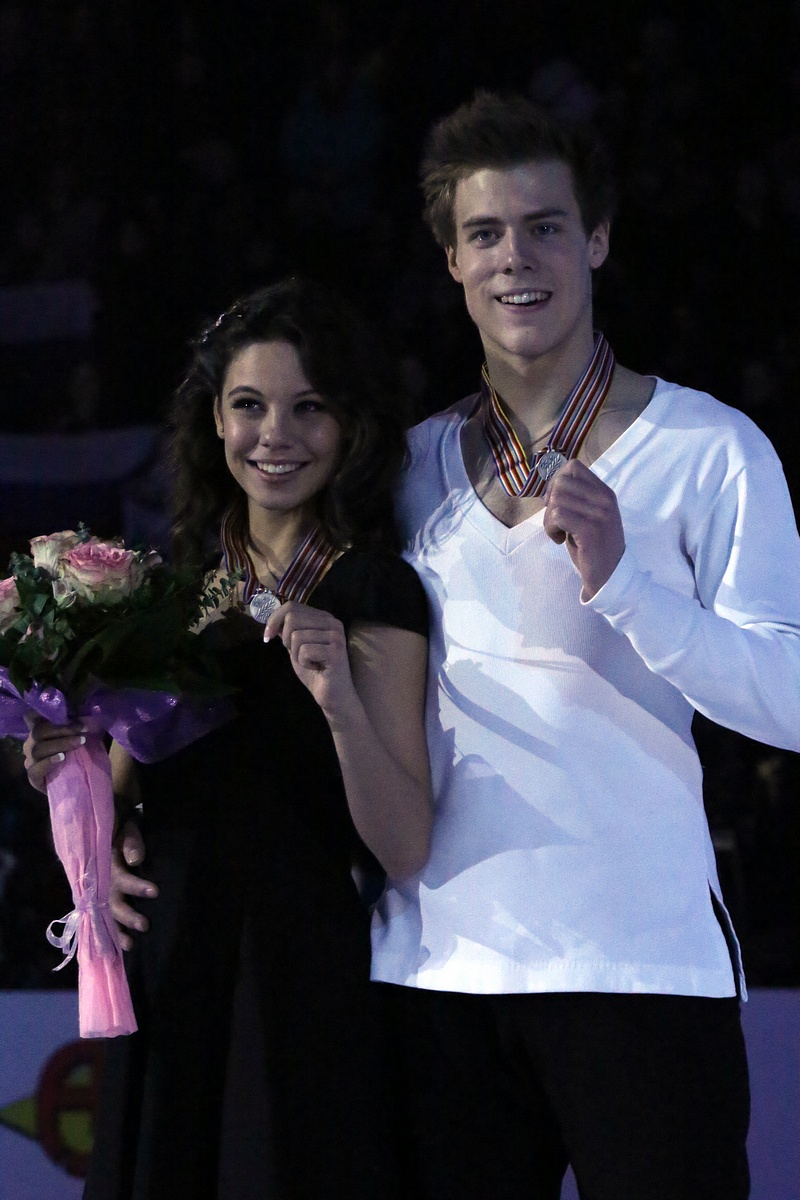
Ilinykh and Katsalapov at the 2013 European Championships

Season	Short dance	Free dance	Exhibition
2013–2014	Quickstep: Bei Mir Bistu Shein by Sholom Secunda; Slow foxtrot: Sixteen Tons performed by LeAnn Rimes; Quickstep: Sing, Sing, Sing	Swan Lake by Pyotr I. Tchaikovsky choreo. by Nikolai Morozov	I Believe by Ayaka; Snow by Philipp Kirkorov, Anastasiya Petryk; Adagio in G minor by Tomaso Albinoni
2012–2013	Uzbek dance: Andijan Polka (specially composed arrangement)	Ghost the Musical by Dave Stewart and Glen Ballard	Capricious Horses by Garik Sukachev; Someone like You by Adele
2011–2012	Hip Hip Chin Chin by Club des Belugas; Mas que nada by Sérgio Mendes; Mujer Latina by Thalía	Ave Maria performed by Thomas Spencer-Wortley	Black Velvet by Alannah Myles
2010–2011	Waltz: Agony by Alfred Schnittke; Tango: Red Tango by Bayan Mix	Don Quixote by Ludwig Minkus	I Put a Spell on You by Nina Simone; Snow by Philipp Kirkorov, Anastasiya Petryk; Petite Fleur; Rock Around the Clock
	Original dance		
2009–2010	Sikuriadas (Panpipes Of The Andes) by Incantation	Schindler's List by John Williams; Fiddler on the Roof	Petite Fleur; Rock Around The Clock
2008–2009	Selections; Sing, Sing, Sing by Louis Prima	Sarabande by Jon Lord	
2004–2005	Swing combo	Cats by Andrew Lloyd Webber	

== Competitive highlights ==
GP: Grand Prix; CS: Challenger Series; JGP: Junior Grand Prix

=== With Shibnev ===
International
Event	2017–18
CS Tallinn Trophy	WD
National
Russian Champ.	
TBD = Assigned; WD = Withdrew

=== With Zhiganshin ===
International
Event	2014–15	2015–16	2016–17
Worlds	7th		
Europeans	4th		
GP Final	6th		
GP Bompard			4th
GP Rostelecom Cup	2nd	5th	
GP Cup of China	4th	3rd	
GP Skate America			5th
CS Mordovian Ornament		1st	
CS Tallinn Trophy			1st
National
Russian Champ.	1st	4th	4th
Team events
World Team Trophy	2nd T (4th P)		
TBD = Assigned; WD = Withdrew; T = Team result; P = Personal result; Medals awarded for team result only.

=== With Katsalapov ===
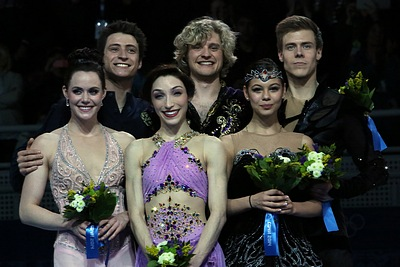
Ilinykh and Katsalapov at the 2014 Winter Olympics podium.

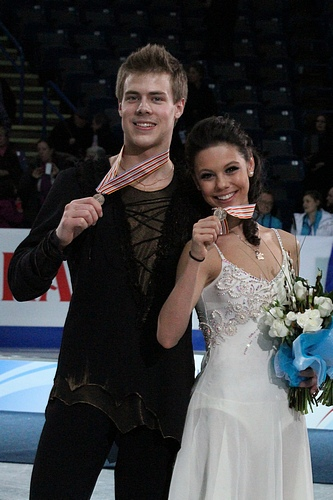
Ilinykh and Katsalapov at the 2012 European Championships

International
Event	2008–09	2009–10	2010–11	2011–12	2012–13	2013–14
Olympics						3rd
Worlds			7th	5th	9th	4th
Europeans			4th	3rd	2nd	2nd
GP Final					6th	
GP Bompard				4th		2nd
GP NHK Trophy			4th	3rd	2nd	4th
GP Rostelecom			3rd		2nd	
Crystal Skate					1st	
International: Junior
Junior Worlds		1st				
JGP Final		2nd				
JGP Hungary		1st				
JGP Poland		1st				
National
Russian Champ.			3rd	2nd	2nd	2nd
Russian Junior	4th	2nd				
Team events
Olympics						1st 3rd P
World Team; Trophy				5th T 5th P		
T = Team result; P = Personal result; Medals awarded for team result only.

== Detailed results ==
Small medals for short and free programs awarded only at ISU Championships.

=== With Zhiganshin ===
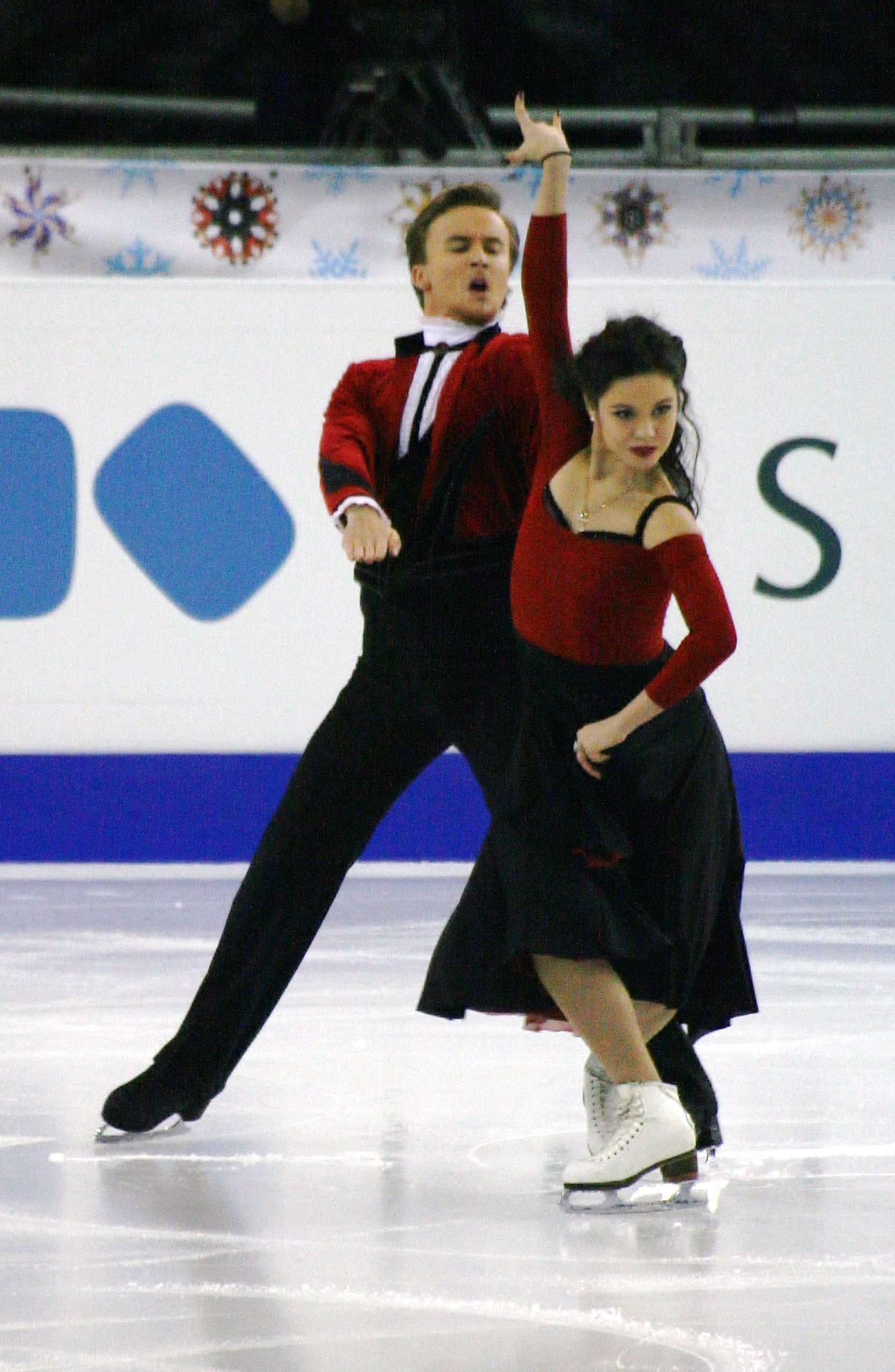
Ilinykh/Zhiganshin at the 2014–15 Grand Prix Final

2016–17 season
Date	Event	SD	FD	Total
22–25 December 2016	2017 Russian Championships	4; 73.22	3; 105.06	4; 178.28
20–27 November 2016	2016 CS Tallinn Trophy	1; 76.04	1; 109.15	1; 185.19
11–13 November 2016	2016 Trophée de France	2; 68.72	4; 98.68	4; 167.40
21–23 October 2016	2016 Skate America	4; 66.60	6; 98.56	5; 165.16
2015–16 season
Date	Event	SD	FD	Total
23–27 December 2015	2016 Russian Championships	4; 66.75	2; 102.97	4; 169.72
20–22 November 2015	2015 Rostelecom Cup	6; 54.46	4; 98.55	5; 153.01
5–8 November 2015	2015 Cup of China	3; 63.54	3; 95.46	3; 159.00
15–18 October 2015	2015 Mordovian Ornament	1; 70.12	1; 106.58	1; 176.70
2014–15 season
Date	Event	SD	FD	Total
16–19 April 2015	2015 World Team Trophy	4; 63.09	4; 95.10	2T/4P; 158.19
23–29 March 2015	2015 World Championships	5; 69.46	9; 95.38	7; 164.84
26 Jan. - 1 Feb. 2015	2015 European Championships	2; 69.94	8; 89.89	4; 159.83
25–28 December 2014	2015 Russian Championships	1; 70.35	2; 101.06	1; 171.41
11–14 December 2014	2014 Grand Prix Final	6; 60.25	4; 96.21	6; 156.46
14–16 November 2014	2014 Rostelecom Cup	2; 64.12	3; 96.31	2; 160.43
7–9 November 2014	2014 Cup of China	4; 60.48	4; 84.22	4; 144.70

=== With Katsalapov ===
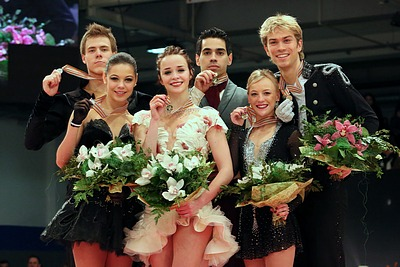
Ilinykh and Katsalapov at the 2014 European Championships podium.

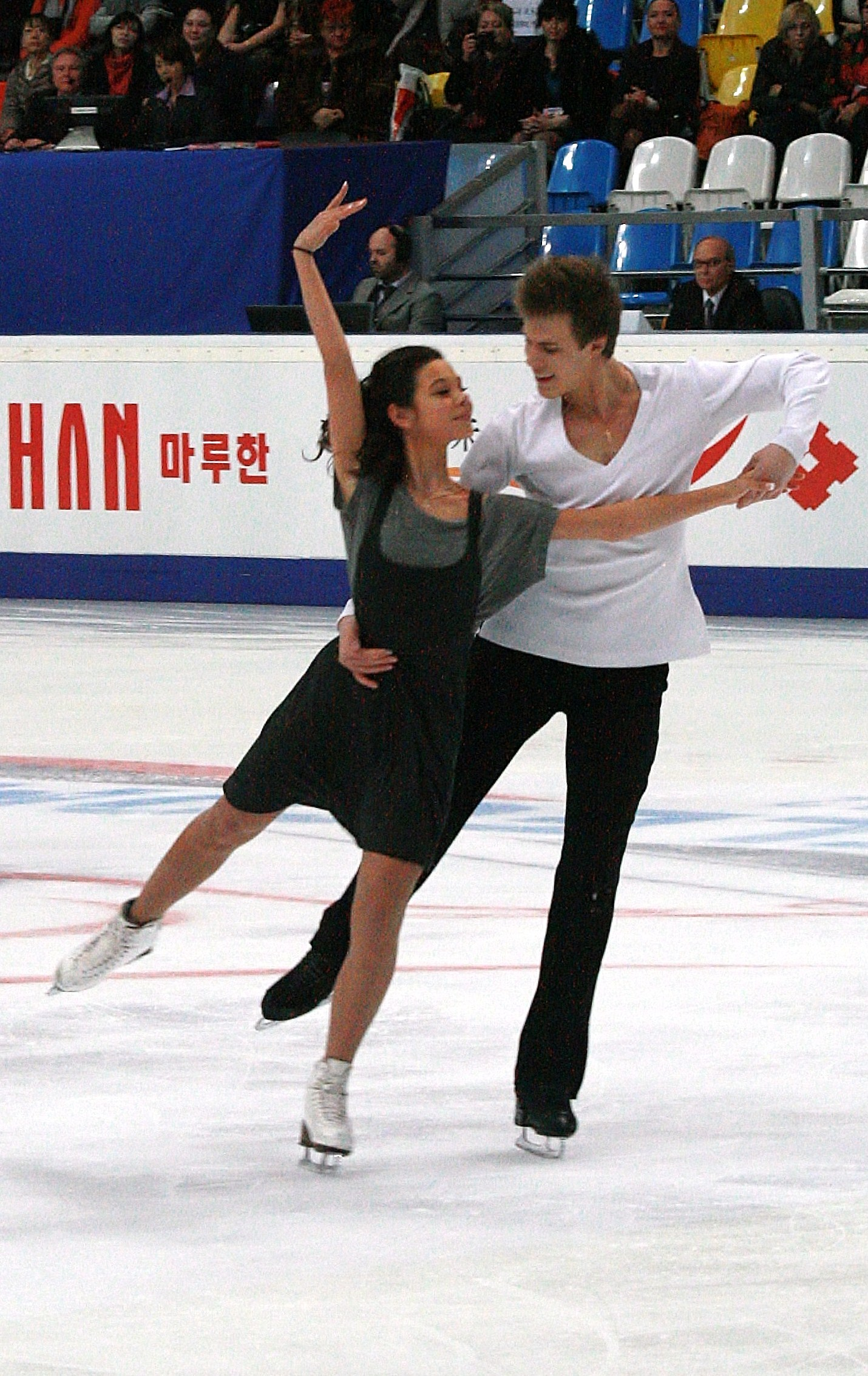
Ilinykh and Katsalapov Free dance at the 2012 Rostelecom Cup

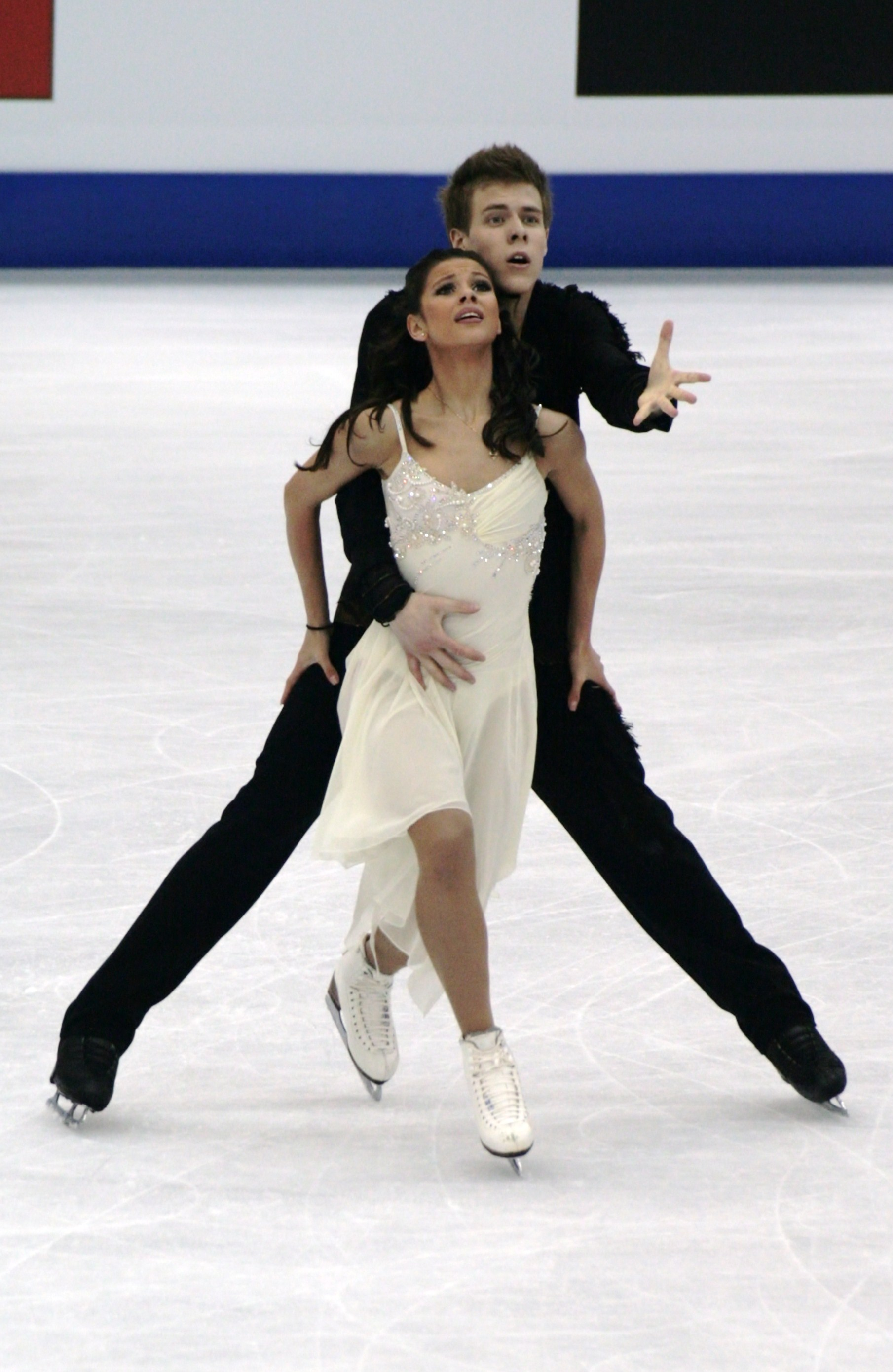
Ilinykh and Katsalapov at the 2012 World Championships

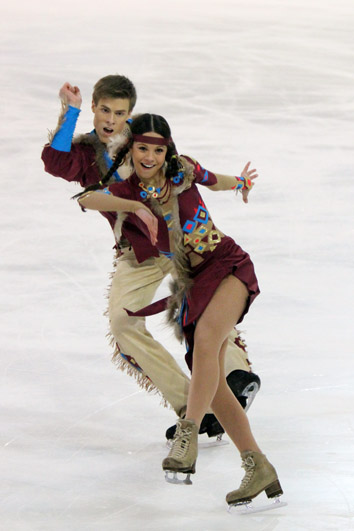
The original dance at 2010 Junior Worlds

2013–14 season
Date	Event	Level	SD	FD	Total
28–29 March 2014	2014 World Championships	Senior	5; 65.67	1; 108.71	4; 174.38
16–17 February 2014	2014 Winter Olympics	Senior	3; 73.04	3; 110.44	3; 183.48
6–9 February 2014	2014 Winter Olympics (Team Event)	Senior		3; 103.48	1
15–19 January 2014	2014 European Championships	Senior	2; 69.54	2; 100.97	2; 170.51
24–27 December 2013	2014 Russian Championships	Senior	2; 68.67	2; 99.34	2; 168.01
15–17 November 2013	2013 Trophee Eric Bompard	Senior	3; 69.07	2; 102.82	2; 171.89
8–10 November 2013	2013 NHK Trophy	Senior	4; 61.35	4; 94.02	4; 155.37
2012–13 season
Date	Event	Level	SD	FD	Total
10–17 March 2013	2013 World Championships	Senior	9; 66.07	10; 91.45	9; 157.52
23–27 January 2013	2013 European Championships	Senior	2; 68.98	1; 100.16	2; 169.14
25–28 December 2012	2013 Russian Championships	Senior	2; 66.14	2; 105.53	2; 171.67
6–9 December 2012	2012–13 Grand Prix Final	Senior	6; 63.56	5; 92.80	6; 156.36
22–25 November 2012	2012 NHK Trophy	Senior	3; 59.96	2; 96.66	2; 156.62
8–11 November 2012	2012 Rostelecom Cup	Senior	2; 65.70	2; 92.76	2; 158.46
30 Oct. – 4 Nov. 2012	2012 Crystal Skate	Senior	1; 70.95	1; 103.61	1; 174.56
2011–12 season
Date	Event	Level	SD	FD	Total
18–22 April 2012	2012 World Team Trophy	Senior	5; 60.44	5; 86.40	5T/5P; 146.84
26–29 March 2012	2012 World Championships	Senior	5; 65.34	5; 95.66	5; 161.00
23–29 January 2012	2012 European Championships	Senior	7; 59.49	3; 93.63	3; 153.12
25–29 December 2011	2012 Russian Championships	Senior	2; 66.94	2; 95.00	2; 161.94
18–20 November 2011	2011 Trophée Eric Bompard	Senior	4; 58.17	4; 82.15	4; 140.32
11–13 November 2011	2011 NHK Trophy	Senior	1; 61.83	3; 87.65	3; 149.48
2010–11 season
Date	Event	Level	SD	FD	Total
24 April – 1 May 2011	2011 World Championships	Senior	6; 65.51	10; 88.99	7; 154.50
24–30 January 2011	2011 European Championships	Senior	4; 60.93	4; 92.55	4; 153.48
26–29 December 2010	2011 Russian Championships	Senior	2; 62.30	4; 87.42	3; 149.72
19–21 November 2010	2010 Cup of Russia	Senior	6; 49.14	2; 85.65	3; 134.79
22–24 October 2010	2010 NHK Trophy	Senior	3; 56.89	4; 78.16	4; 135.05
2009–10 season
Date	Event	Level	OD	FD	Total
8–14 March 2010	2010 World Junior Championships	Junior	1; 59.94	1; 90.82	1; 188.28
3–6 February 2010	2010 Russian Junior Championships	Junior	2 –	2 –	2; 184.51
3–6 December 2009	2009 JGP Final	Junior	3; 54.35	2; 85.01	2; 139.36
9–13 September 2009	2009 JGP Poland	Junior	1; 54.03	1; 82.56	1; 171.61
26 Aug. – 30 Sept. 2009	2009 JGP Hungary	Junior	1; 50.46	1; 81.50	1; 166.06
