= G'day G'day (song) =

Single by Slim Dusty

from the album G'day G'day
- B-side: "Break Away"
- Released: August 1988
- Genre: Country
- Length: 3:10
- Label: Columbia
- Songwriter(s): Rob Fairbairn

"G'day G'day" is a song by Australian country singer Slim Dusty. The song was released in August 1988 as the lead single from Dusty's studio album of the same name. The song peaked at number 37 on the ARIA Charts. The song has since been covered numerous times on various Australian compilation albums.

The song won Country Song of the Year and Comedy/Novelty Song of the Year at the 1989 Tamworth Songwriters Awards.

In 2014, IGA Supermarkets celebrated Australia Day with its new campaign "Say G'day Day" which was supported by the release of a modern version of "G'day G'day".

== Track listing ==
No.	Title	Writer(s)	Length
1.	"G'day G'day"	Rob Fairbairn	3:10
2.	"Break Away"	Ernie Constance

== Weekly charts ==
Charts (1988)	Peak position
Australia (ARIA)	37

== Certifications ==
Certifications for "G'day G'day"
Region	Certification	Certified units/sales
Australia (ARIA)	Gold	35,000^{‡}
^{‡} Sales+streaming figures based on certification alone.

== Release history ==
Region	Date	Format	Edition(s)	Label	Catalogue
Australia	August 1988	Cassette; 7" Vinyl	Standard	Columbia Records	DO 2130
