= 2010–11 Grand Prix of Figure Skating Final =

2010–11 Grand Prix Final
- Type: Grand Prix
- Date: December 8 – 12
- Season: 2010–11
- Location: Beijing, China
- Host: Chinese Skating Association
- Venue: Capital Indoor Stadium

Champions
- Men's singles: (Canada) Patrick Chan (S) (United States) Richard Dornbush (J)
- Ladies' singles: (United States) Alissa Czisny (S) (Russia) Adelina Sotnikova (J)
- Pairs: (Germany) Aliona Savchenko / Robin Szolkowy (S) (Japan) Narumi Takahashi / Mervin Tran (J)
- Ice dance: (United States) Meryl Davis / Charlie White (S) (Russia) Ksenia Monko / Kirill Khaliavin (J)
- Previous: 2009–10 Grand Prix Final
- Next: 2011–12 Grand Prix Final
- Previous Grand Prix: 2010 Trophée Éric Bompard

The 2010–11 Grand Prix of Figure Skating Final was a figure skating competition in the 2010–11 season, held in conjunction with the ISU Junior Grand Prix Final. It was the culminating competition of both the 2010–11 ISU Grand Prix of Figure Skating, a senior-level international invitational competition, and the 2010–11 ISU Junior Grand Prix, a junior-level international competition.

The event was held in Beijing, China from December 8–12, 2010. Medals were awarded in the disciplines of men's singles, ladies' singles, pair skating, and ice dancing on the senior and junior levels.

== Schedule ==
(Local Time, GMT +08:00)

- Thursday, December 9
  - 16:45 Junior ice dancing: Short dance
  - 18:10 Junior ladies: Short program
  - 19:35 Junior men: Short program
  - 21:00 Junior pairs: Short program
- Friday, December 10
  - 14:15 Junior ice dancing: Free dance
  - 15:45 Junior ladies: Free skating
  - 17:15 Ice dancing: Short dance
  - 18:25 Men: Short program
  - 19:30 Ladies: Short program
  - 20:35 Pairs: Short program
- Saturday, December 11
  - 13:45 Junior men: Free skating
  - 15:20 Junior pairs: Free skating
  - 16:55 Men: Free skating
  - 18:10 Ladies: Free skating
  - 19:20 Ice dancing: Free dance
  - 20:40 Pairs: Free skating
- Sunday, December 12
  - Exhibition gala

== Qualifiers ==
=== Senior-level qualifiers ===
Skaters who reached the age of 14 by July 1, 2010 were eligible to compete at two senior 2010–11 Grand Prix events, including the 2010 NHK Trophy, 2010 Skate Canada International, 2010 Cup of China, 2010 Skate America, 2010 Cup of Russia, and 2010 Trophée Éric Bompard. They earned points at these events and the six highest ranking skaters/teams qualified for the senior Grand Prix Final. The following skaters qualified for the 2010–11 Grand Prix Final.

	Men	Ladies	Pairs	Ice dancing
1	(Japan) Takahiko Kozuka	(Japan) Miki Ando	(Germany) Aliona Savchenko / Robin Szolkowy	(United States) Meryl Davis / Charlie White
2	(Japan) Daisuke Takahashi	(United States) Alissa Czisny	(China) Pang Qing / Tong Jian	(France) Nathalie Péchalat / Fabian Bourzat
3	(Canada) Patrick Chan	(Italy) Carolina Kostner	(Russia) Vera Bazarova / Yuri Larionov	(Canada) Vanessa Crone / Paul Poirier
4	(Czech Republic) Tomáš Verner	(Japan) Kanako Murakami	(Canada) Kirsten Moore-Towers / Dylan Moscovitch	(Russia) Ekaterina Bobrova / Dmitri Soloviev
5	(Japan) Nobunari Oda	(Japan) Akiko Suzuki	(Russia) Lubov Iliushechkina / Nodari Maisuradze	(Canada) Kaitlyn Weaver / Andrew Poje
6	(France) Florent Amodio	(United States) Rachael Flatt	(China) Sui Wenjing / Han Cong	(Hungary) Nóra Hoffmann / Maxim Zavozin
Alternates
1st	(United States) Jeremy Abbott	(Finland) Kiira Korpi	(Japan) Narumi Takahashi / Mervin Tran	(United States) Maia Shibutani / Alex Shibutani
2nd	(United States) Brandon Mroz	(United States) Mirai Nagasu	(United States) Caitlin Yankowskas / John Coughlin	(United States) Madison Chock / Greg Zuerlein
3rd	(United States) Adam Rippon	(United States) Ashley Wagner	(Canada) Paige Lawrence / Rudi Swiegers	(Russia) Ekaterina Riazanova / Ilia Tkachenko

=== Junior-level qualifiers ===
Skaters who reached the age of 13 by July 1, 2010 but were not yet 19 on that date (singles and females of the other two disciplines) or 21 (male pair skaters and ice dancers) were eligible to compete at two 2010–11 Junior Grand Prix events. They earned points at these events and the eight highest ranking skaters/teams qualified for the Junior Grand Prix Final.

The following skaters qualified for the 2010–11 Junior Grand Prix Final.

	Men	Ladies	Pairs	Ice dancing
1	(Canada) Andrei Rogozine	(Russia) Adelina Sotnikova	(Russia) Ksenia Stolbova / Fedor Klimov	(Russia) Ksenia Monko / Kirill Khaliavin
2	(China) Yan Han	(Russia) Elizaveta Tuktamysheva	(China) Sui Wenjing / Han Cong (withdrew)	(Russia) Alexandra Stepanova / Ivan Bukin
3	(United States) Joshua Farris	(Japan) Risa Shoji	(China) Yu Xiaoyu / Jin Yang	(Russia) Ekaterina Pushkash / Jonathan Guerreiro
4	(United States) Keegan Messing	(Russia) Polina Shelepen	(Japan) Narumi Takahashi / Mervin Tran	(United States) Charlotte Lichtman / Dean Copely
5	(United States) Richard Dornbush	(United States) Christina Gao	(Canada) Natasha Purich / Raymond Schultz	(Russia) Evgenia Kosigina / Nikolai Moroshkin
6	(United States) Max Aaron	(United States) Yasmin Siraj	(Russia) Anna Silaeva / Artur Minchuk	(Russia) Victoria Sinitsina / Ruslan Zhiganshin
7	(Russia) Zhan Bush	(United States) Kristiene Gong	(United States) Ashley Cain / Joshua Reagan	(Ukraine) Anastasia Galyeta /Alexei Shumski
8	(Russia) Gordei Gorshkov	(United States) Kiri Baga (withdrew)	(Canada) Taylor Steele / Robert Schultz	(Russia) Marina Antipova / Artem Kudashev
Alternates
1st	(Russia) Artur Dmitriev Jr	(China) Li Zijun (called up)	(Canada) Brittany Jones / Kurtis Gaskell (called up)	(France) Tiffany Zahorski / Alexis Miart
2nd	(United States) Jason Brown	(Belgium) Ira Vannut	(Russia) Tatiana Danilova / Andrei Novoselov	(United States) Anastasia Cannuscio/ Colin McManus
3rd	(Sweden) Alexander Majorov	(Japan) Shion Kokobun	(United States) Kylie Duarte / Colin Grafton	(France) Gabriella Papadakis / Guillaume Cizeron

== Competition notes ==
In the junior event, Kiri Baga had to withdraw due to Achilles tendinopathy in her left ankle. Sui Wenjing and Han Cong withdrew due to qualification to senior Grand Prix Final. There were allegations that two female skaters, Sui in the senior event and Yu Xiaoyu in the junior event, were too young for those competitions, while a male skater Jin Yang was alleged to be too old for the junior event.

== Senior-level results ==
=== Men ===
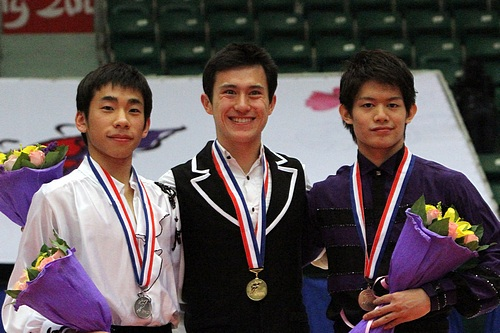
The men's medalists

Rank	Name	Nation	Total points	SP		FS	
1	Patrick Chan	Canada	259.75	2	85.59	1	174.16
2	Nobunari Oda	Japan	242.81	1	86.59	3	156.22
3	Takahiko Kozuka	Japan	237.79	4	77.90	2	159.89
4	Daisuke Takahashi	Japan	219.77	3	82.57	6	137.20
5	Tomáš Verner	Czech Republic	213.64	5	65.37	4	148.27
6	Florent Amodio	France	201.90	6	61.64	5	140.26

=== Ladies ===
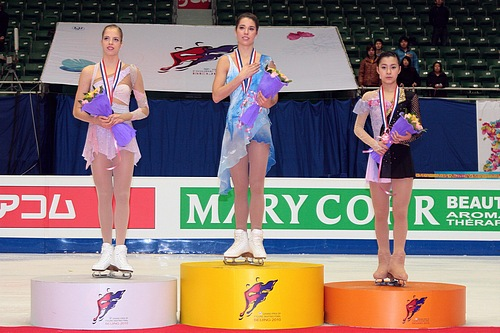
The ladies' medalists

Rank	Name	Nation	Total points	SP		FS	
1	Alissa Czisny	United States	180.75	1	63.76	3	116.99
2	Carolina Kostner	Italy	178.60	2	62.13	4	116.47
3	Kanako Murakami	Japan	178.59	3	61.47	2	117.12
4	Akiko Suzuki	Japan	173.72	4	58.26	5	115.46
5	Miki Ando	Japan	173.15	5	50.45	1	122.70
6	Rachael Flatt	United States	127.57	6	45.19	6	82.38

=== Pairs ===
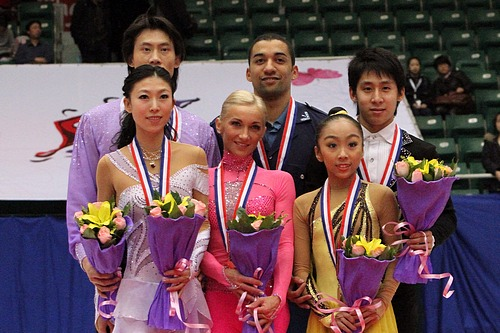
The pairs' medalists

Rank	Name	Nation	Total points	SP		FS	
1	Aliona Savchenko / Robin Szolkowy	Germany	210.72	1	74.40	1	136.32
2	Pang Qing / Tong Jian	China	189.93	2	68.63	2	121.30
3	Sui Wenjing / Han Cong	China	179.04	4	61.49	3	117.55
4	Lubov Iliushechkina / Nodari Maisuradze	Russia	177.44	5	60.06	4	117.38
5	Vera Bazarova / Yuri Larionov	Russia	176.80	3	63.86	5	112.94
6	Kirsten Moore-Towers / Dylan Moscovitch	Canada	169.57	6	58.73	6	110.84

=== Ice dancing ===
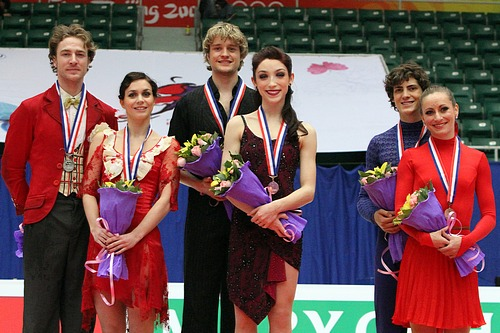
The ice dancing medalists

Rank	Name	Nation	Total points	SD		FD	
1	Meryl Davis / Charlie White	United States	171.58	1	68.64	1	102.94
2	Nathalie Péchalat / Fabian Bourzat	France	162.10	2	65.66	2	96.44
3	Vanessa Crone / Paul Poirier	Canada	139.74	5	54.82	3	84.92
4	Ekaterina Bobrova / Dmitri Soloviev	Russia	136.75	6	54.33	4	82.42
5	Kaitlyn Weaver / Andrew Poje	Canada	136.34	4	55.51	5	80.83
6	Nóra Hoffmann / Maxim Zavozin	Hungary	132.07	3	55.98	6	76.09

== Junior-level results ==
=== Junior men ===
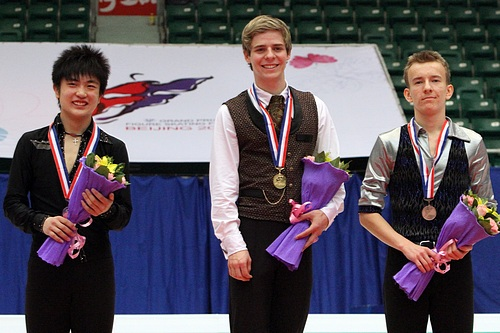
The men's medalists

Rank	Name	Nation	Total points	SP		FS	
1	Richard Dornbush	United States	219.56	1	70.75	1	148.81
2	Yan Han	China	186.05	3	67.29	3	118.76
3	Andrei Rogozine	Canada	181.78	7	59.17	2	122.61
4	Max Aaron	United States	181.28	5	63.78	4	117.50
5	Keegan Messing	United States	174.42	2	68.52	8	106.90
6	Joshua Farris	United States	173.97	4	65.24	7	108.73
7	Zhan Bush	Russia	173.75	6	60.05	6	113.70
8	Gordei Gorshkov	Russia	171.81	8	55.55	5	116.26

=== Junior ladies ===
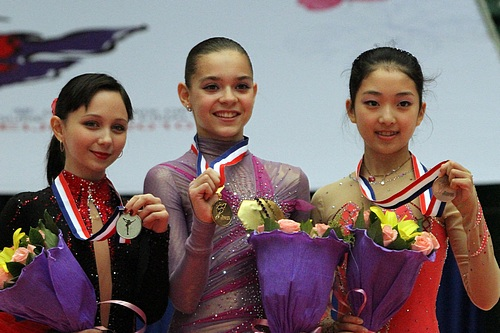
The ladies' medalists

Rank	Name	Nation	Total points	SP		FS	
1	Adelina Sotnikova	Russia	169.81	1	57.27	1	112.54
2	Elizaveta Tuktamysheva	Russia	160.87	2	53.76	2	107.11
3	Li Zijun	China	149.82	5	49.62	4	100.20
4	Risa Shoji	Japan	149.82	4	52.56	5	97.26
5	Polina Shelepen	Russia	147.37	3	53.26	6	94.11
6	Christina Gao	United States	145.01	7	43.98	3	101.03
7	Yasmin Siraj	United States	130.95	8	38.08	7	92.87
8	Kristiene Gong	United States	129.90	6	47.24	8	82.66

=== Junior pairs ===
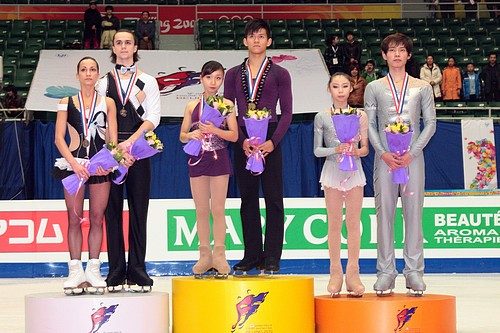
The pairs' medalists

Rank	Name	Nation	Total points	SP		FS	
1	Narumi Takahashi / Mervin Tran	Japan	159.52	1	53.94	1	105.58
2	Ksenia Stolbova / Fedor Klimov	Russia	150.54	2	49.63	2	100.91
3	Yu Xiaoyu / Jin Yang	China	140.58	6	43.68	3	96.90
4	Taylor Steele / Robert Schultz	Canada	133.08	3	48.07	6	85.01
5	Ashley Cain / Joshua Reagan	United States	131.96	5	43.92	5	88.04
6	Brittany Jones / Kurtis Gaskell	Canada	131.04	7	42.34	4	88.70
7	Natasha Purich / Raymond Schultz	Canada	127.02	4	45.30	7	81.72
8	Anna Silaeva / Artur Minchuk	Russia	113.99	8	35.25	8	78.74

=== Junior ice dancing ===
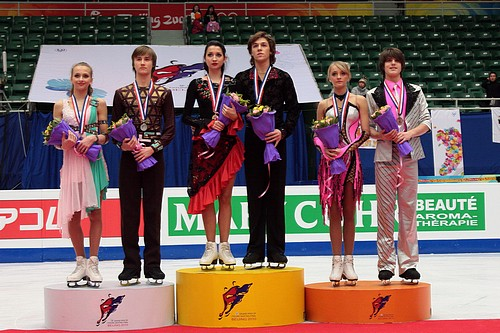
The ice dancing medalists

Rank	Name	Nation	Total points	SD		FD	
1	Ksenia Monko / Kirill Khaliavin	Russia	136.22	2	55.50	1	80.72
2	Victoria Sinitsina / Ruslan Zhiganshin	Russia	134.62	1	55.58	2	79.04
3	Alexandra Stepanova / Ivan Bukin	Russia	129.94	3	53.59	3	76.35
4	Ekaterina Pushkash / Jonathan Guerreiro	Russia	123.75	4	53.06	6	70.69
5	Charlotte Lichtman / Dean Copely	United States	121.58	5	50.74	5	70.84
6	Evgenia Kosigina / Nikolai Moroshkin	Russia	118.60	6	46.98	4	71.62
7	Anastasia Galyeta / Alexei Shumski	Ukraine	113.54	7	45.10	7	68.44
8	Marina Antipova / Artem Kudashev	Russia	110.16	8	43.18	8	66.98

== Medal count ==
Rank	Nation	Gold	Silver	Bronze	Total
1	United States (USA)	3	0	0	3
2	Russia (RUS)	2	3	1	6
3	Canada (CAN)	1	0	2	3
4	Germany (GER)	1	0	0	1
5	China (CHN)	0	2	3	5
6	Japan (JPN)	0	1	2	3
7	France (FRA)	0	1	0	1
7	Italy (ITA)	0	1	0	1
Totals (8 entries)		7	8	8	23
