= 2011 Cup of China =

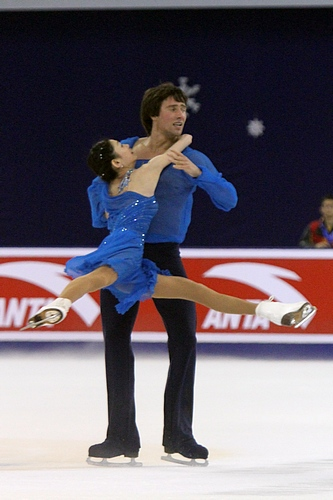
- Yuko Kawaguchi and Alexander Smirnov at the 2011 China Cup
- Type: Grand Prix
- Date: November 3 – 6
- Season: 2011–12
- Location: Shanghai
- Host: Chinese Skating Association
- Venue: Shanghai Oriental Sports Center

Champions
- Men's singles: (United States) Jeremy Abbott
- Ladies' singles: (Italy) Carolina Kostner
- Pairs: (Russia) Yuko Kavaguti / Alexander Smirnov
- Ice dance: (Russia) Ekaterina Bobrova / Dmitri Soloviev
- Previous: 2010 Cup of China
- Next: 2012 Cup of China
- Previous Grand Prix: 2011 Skate Canada International
- Next Grand Prix: 2011 NHK Trophy

The 2011 Cup of China was the third event of six in the 2011–12 ISU Grand Prix of Figure Skating, a senior-level international invitational competition series. It was held at the Shanghai Oriental Sports Center in Shanghai on November 3–6. Medals were awarded in the disciplines of men's singles, ladies' singles, pair skating, and ice dancing. Skaters earned points toward qualifying for the 2011–12 Grand Prix Final.

== Eligibility ==
Skaters who reached the age of 14 by July 1, 2011 were eligible to compete on the senior Grand Prix circuit.

In July 2011, minimum score requirements were added to the Grand Prix series and were set at two-thirds of the top scores at the 2011 World Championships. Prior to competing in a Grand Prix event, skaters were required to earn the following:

Discipline	Minimum
Men	168.60
Ladies	117.48
Pairs	130.71
Ice dancing	111.15

== Entries ==
The entries were as follows. Brian Joubert was assigned to the event but withdrew due to a back injury. Jinlin Guan of China also withdrew; as both skaters had withdrawn just days prior to the event, no replacements were assigned and the men's field consisted of eight skaters.

Country	Men	Ladies	Pairs	Ice dancing
Canada	Kevin Reynolds		Taylor Steele / Robert Schultz; Kirsten Moore-Towers / Dylan Moscovitch	
China	Guan Jinlin; Wu Jialiang; Song Nan	Geng Bingwa; Zhang Kexin; Zhu Qiuying	Sui Wenjing / Han Cong; Zhang Dan / Zhang Hao; Yu Xiaoyu / Jin Yang	Huang Xintong / Zheng Xun; Yu Xiaoyang / Wang Chen
Czech Republic			Klára Kadlecová / Petr Bidař	
France				Pernelle Carron / Lloyd Jones
Italy		Carolina Kostner; Valentina Marchei		
Japan	Yuzuru Hanyu; Nobunari Oda	Kanako Murakami		
Russia	Artur Gachinski	Ksenia Makarova; Adelina Sotnikova	Yuko Kavaguti / Alexander Smirnov	Ekaterina Bobrova / Dmitri Soloviev
United Kingdom				Penny Coomes / Nicholas Buckland
United States	Jeremy Abbott; Richard Dornbush	Christina Gao; Mirai Nagasu	Amanda Evora / Mark Ladwig	Charlotte Lichtman / Dean Copely; Maia Shibutani / Alex Shibutani; Emily Samuelson / Todd Gilles

== Schedule of events ==
(Local time, UTC +08:00):

- Thursday, November 3
  - 10:30–16:35 – Official practices
- Friday, November 4
  - 09:45–14:30 – Official practices
  - 15:30–16:36 – Short dance
  - 17:00–18:21 – Ladies' short program
  - 18:45–20:06 – Men's short program
  - 20:45–21:55 – Pairs' short program
- Saturday, November 5
  - 08:30–13:55 – Official practices
  - 14:30–15:45 – Free dance
  - 16:15–17:47 – Ladies' free skating
  - 18:15–19:52 – Men's free skating
  - 20:30–21:50 – Pairs' free skating
  - 22:00 – Medal ceremonies
- Sunday, November 6
  - 14:00–16:35 – Official practices
  - 19:00–21:30 – Exhibition

== Results ==
=== Men ===
Rank	Name	Nation	Total points	SP		FS	
1	Jeremy Abbott	United States	228.49	3	79.32	3	149.17
2	Nobunari Oda	Japan	227.11	4	77.65	2	149.46
3	Song Nan	China	226.75	5	72.72	1	154.03
4	Yuzuru Hanyu	Japan	226.53	2	81.37	4	145.16
5	Artur Gachinski	Russia	222.54	1	81.64	6	140.90
6	Richard Dornbush	United States	205.27	8	62.93	5	142.34
7	Kevin Reynolds	Canada	204.41	7	64.31	7	140.10
8	Wu Jialiang	China	182.49	6	65.06	8	117.43

=== Ladies ===
Rank	Name	Nation	Total points	SP		FS	
1	Carolina Kostner	Italy	182.14	1	61.88	1	120.26
2	Mirai Nagasu	United States	173.22	2	60.96	2	112.26
3	Adelina Sotnikova	Russia	159.95	3	53.74	3	106.21
4	Zhang Kexin	China	153.32	5	52.85	5	100.47
5	Christina Gao	United States	152.48	8	51.99	4	100.49
6	Kanako Murakami	Japan	150.20	4	53.09	7	97.11
7	Ksenia Makarova	Russia	143.47	9	45.90	6	97.57
8	Geng Bingwa	China	142.09	6	52.61	8	89.48
9	Valentina Marchei	Italy	133.86	7	45.90	9	81.44
10	Zhu Qiuying	China	108.57	10	35.28	10	73.29

=== Pairs ===
Rank	Name	Nation	Total points	SP		FS	
1	Yuko Kavaguti / Alexander Smirnov	Russia	186.74	1	64.45	1	122.29
2	Zhang Dan / Zhang Hao	China	177.67	3	60.57	2	117.10
3	Kirsten Moore-Towers / Dylan Moscovitch	Canada	172.04	2	60.78	4	111.26
4	Amanda Evora / Mark Ladwig	United States	170.63	5	57.88	3	112.75
5	Sui Wenjing / Han Cong	China	169.47	4	60.00	5	109.47
6	Yu Xiaoyu / Jin Yang	China	162.96	6	54.42	6	108.54
7	Taylor Steele / Robert Schultz	Canada	141.84	7	48.25	7	93.59
8	Klára Kadlecová / Petr Bidař	Czech Republic	120.95	8	38.34	8	82.61

=== Ice dancing ===
Rank	Name	Nation	Total points	SD		FD	
1	Ekaterina Bobrova / Dmitri Soloviev	Russia	163.52	1	65.73	1	97.79
2	Maia Shibutani / Alex Shibutani	United States	148.40	2	57.79	2	90.61
3	Pernelle Carron / Lloyd Jones	France	130.97	4	52.41	3	78.56
4	Penny Coomes / Nicholas Buckland	United Kingdom	130.39	3	53.89	4	76.50
5	Huang Xintong / Zheng Xun	China	120.11	6	45.07	5	75.04
6	Yu Xiaoyang / Wang Chen	China	115.59	5	48.36	7	67.23
7	Charlotte Lichtman / Dean Copely	United States	109.61	8	40.26	6	69.35
8	Emily Samuelson / Todd Gilles	United States	106.74	7	43.64	8	63.10
