= 2010–11 ISU Junior Grand Prix =

International figure skating competition

- Type: ISU Junior Grand Prix
- Date: August 25 – December 12, 2010
- Season: 2010–11
- Location: (France) Courchevel (Romania) Braşov (Austria) Graz (Japan) Karuizawa (United Kingdom) Sheffield (Germany) Dresden (Czech Republic) Ostrava (China) Beijing
- Previous: 2009–10 ISU Junior Grand Prix
- Next: 2011–12 ISU Junior Grand Prix

The 2010–11 ISU Junior Grand Prix was the 14th season of the ISU Junior Grand Prix, a series of international junior level competitions organized by the International Skating Union. It was the junior-level complement to the 2010–11 ISU Grand Prix of Figure Skating, which was for senior-level skaters. Skaters competed in the disciplines of men's singles, ladies' singles, pair skating, and ice dance.

Skaters earned points towards qualifying for the Junior Grand Prix Final at each of the seven Junior Grand Prix events. The top eight skaters/teams in the series from each discipline met at the 2010–11 Junior Grand Prix Final, which was held concurrently with the senior Grand Prix Final.

== Competitions ==
The locations of the JGP events change yearly. In the 2010–11 season, the series was composed of the following events:

Date	Event	Location	Other notes	Results
August 25–28	2010 JGP Courchevel	Courchevel, France	No pair competition	Details
September 8–12	2010 JGP Brasov Cup	Braşov, Romania	No pair competition	Details
September 15–19	2010 JGP Cup of Austria	Graz, Austria		Details
September 22–26	2010 JGP SBC Cup	Karuizawa, Japan	No pair competition	Details
Sept. 29 – Oct. 3	2010 JGP John Curry Memorial	Sheffield, England		Details
October 6–10	2010 JGP Pokal der Blauen Schwerter	Dresden, Germany		Details
October 13–17	2010 JGP Czech Skate	Ostrava, Czech Republic		Details
December 9–12	2010–11 Junior Grand Prix Final	Beijing, China		Details

For the third time, the Junior Grand Prix Final was held in conjunction with the senior Grand Prix Final.

== Qualifying ==
Skaters who reached the age of 13 by July 1, 2010 but had not turned 19 (singles and females of the other two disciplines) or 21 (male pair skaters and ice dancers) were eligible to compete on the junior circuit. Unlike the senior ISU Grand Prix of Figure Skating, skaters for the Junior Grand Prix are entered by their national federations rather than seeded by the ISU. The number of entries allotted to each ISU member federation is determined by their skaters' placements at the previous season's World Junior Figure Skating Championships in each respective discipline.

For the 2010–2011 season, in singles, the three best placed member nations at the 2010 World Junior Figure Skating Championships were allowed to enter two skaters in all seven events. Member nations who placed fourth through sixth were allowed to enter one skater in all seven events. Member nations who placed seventh through twelfth were allowed to enter one skater in six of the seven events. Member nations with a skater who had qualified for the free skate at the World Junior Championships were allowed to enter one skater in five of the events. Member nations who did not qualify for the free skate but placed 25th through 30th in the short program were allowed to enter one skater in four of the events. Member nations who did not qualify for the free skate but placed 31st and lower in the short program were allowed to enter one skater in three of the events. Member nations who had not participated in the 2010 World Junior Championships were allowed to enter one skater in two events. There were provisions for additional entries per member country if another country did not use all of its allotted entries.

In pairs, member nations who placed in the top five at the 2010 World Junior Championships were allowed to enter three entries in all four events in which pairs were contested. Member nations who qualified for the free skate at the World Junior Championships were allowed to enter two entries in all four events. All other member nations were allowed to enter one entry in all four events. The host nation was allowed to enter as many pair teams as it wanted.

In ice dance, the multiple spots allowance was the same as for singles, through one entry in five events. Member nations who qualified for the original dance but not the free dance at the 2010 World Junior Championships were allowed to enter one team in four of the events. Member nations who placed 31st and lower in the compulsory dance segment were allowed to enter one team in three of the events. Member nations who had not participated in the 2010 World Junior Championships were allowed to enter one team in two events. There were provisions for additional entries per member country if another country did not use all of its allotted entries.

The host country was allowed to enter up to three skaters/teams in singles and dance in their event, and there was no limit to the number of pairs teams.

The general spots allowance for the 2010-2011 Junior Grand Prix events was as follows:

Entries	Men	Ladies	Pairs	Ice dance
3 per event			Canada; China; Japan; Russia; United States	
2 per event	China; Japan; Russia	Japan; Russia; United States	Czech Republic; Estonia; Germany; Hungary	Russia; Canada; United States
1 per event	Canada; Sweden; United States	Canada; Germany; Sweden		Italy; Ukraine; France
1 in six events	Belgium; France; Germany; Kazakhstan; Poland; Spain	Denmark; Estonia; Finland; France; Switzerland; Turkey		Germany; Hungary; Czech Republic; Denmark; United Kingdom; Spain
1 in five events	Brazil; Chinese Taipei; Czech Republic; Finland	Belgium; China; Italy; Latvia; Netherlands; Ukraine		Finland; Slovakia; Poland
1 in four events	Austria; Estonia; Italy; South Korea; Switzerland; Ukraine	Czech Republic; Greece; Norway; Slovenia; Slovakia; Thailand		Austria; Uzbekistan; China; Switzerland; Estonia; Belarus; Romania
1 in three events	Armenia; Australia; Bosnia and Herzegovina; Belarus; Bulgaria; Croatia; United Kingdom; Hong Kong; Hungary; Ireland; Latvia; Lithuania; Netherlands; Romania; Slovakia; Turkey	Andorra; Australia; Austria; Bosnia and Herzegovina; Brazil; Bulgaria; Chinese Taipei; Croatia; Georgia; United Kingdom; Hong Kong; Hungary; Israel; Kazakhstan; South Korea; Lithuania; Mexico; Philippines; Romania; South Africa; Spain; Singapore; Serbia		Bulgaria; Latvia; New Zealand

All other member nations had one entry per discipline in two of the seven events in singles and ice dance and one entry in all four events in pairs.

== Prize money ==
The total prize money for the Junior Grand Prix events in the 2010/2011 season was $22,500. Pairs and dance teams split the money. Everything is in US dollars. The breakdown is as follows:

Placement	Prize money (Singles)	Prize money (Pairs/Dance)
1st	$2,000	$3,000
2nd	$1,500	$2,250
3rd	$1,000	$1,500

The total prize money for the Junior Grand Prix Final in the 2010/2011 season was $105,000. Pairs and dance teams split the money. Everything is in US dollars. The breakdown is as follows:

Placement	Prize money (Singles)	Prize money (Pairs/Dance)
1st	$6,000	$9,000
2nd	$5,000	$7,500
3rd	$4,000	$6,000
4th	$3,000	$4,500
5th	$2,000	$3,000
6th	$1,000	$1,500

== Junior Grand Prix Final qualification and qualifiers ==
=== Qualification rules ===
At each event, skaters/teams who place high enough earn points towards qualification for the Junior Grand Prix Final. Following the 7th event, the top-8 highest scoring skaters/teams advanced to the Final. The points earned per placement was as follows:

Placement	Points (Singles/Dance)	Points (Pairs)
1st	15	15
2nd	13	13
3rd	11	11
4th	9	9
5th	7	7
6th	5	5
7th	4	4
8th	3	3
9th	2	-
10th	1	-

There were 7 tie-breakers in cases of a tie in overall points:

1. Highest placement at an event. If a skater placed 1st and 3rd, the tiebreaker is the 1st place, and that beats a skater who placed 2nd in both events.
2. Highest combined total scores in both events. If a skater earned 200 points at one event and 250 at a second, that skater would win in the second tie-break over a skater who earned 200 points at one event and 150 at another.
3. Participated in two events.
4. Highest combined scores in the free skating/free dance portion of both events.
5. Highest individual score in the free skating/free dance portion from one event.
6. Highest combined scores in the short program/short dance of both events.
7. Highest number of total participants at the events.

If there is still a tie, the tie is considered unbreakable and the tied skaters all advance to the Junior Grand Prix Final.

=== Qualifiers ===
The following skaters qualified for the 2010–2011 Junior Grand Prix Final.

	Men	Ladies	Pairs	Ice dance
1	(Canada) Andrei Rogozine	(Russia) Adelina Sotnikova	(Russia) Ksenia Stolbova / Fedor Klimov	(Russia) Ksenia Monko / Kirill Khaliavin
2	(China) Yan Han	(Russia) Elizaveta Tuktamisheva	(China) ~~Sui Wenjing / Han Cong~~ (withdrew)	(Russia) Alexandra Stepanova / Ivan Bukin
3	(United States) Joshua Farris	(Japan) Risa Shoji	(China) Yu Xiaoyu / Jin Yang	(Russia) Ekaterina Pushkash/Jonathan Guerreiro
4	(United States) Keegan Messing	(Russia) Polina Shelepen	(Japan) Narumi Takahashi / Mervin Tran	(United States) Charlotte Lichtman / Dean Copely
5	(United States) Richard Dornbush	(United States) Christina Gao	(Canada) Natasha Purich / Raymond Schultz	(Russia) Evgenia Kosigina / Nikolai Moroshkin
6	(United States) Max Aaron	(United States) Yasmin Siraj	(Russia) Anna Silaeva / Artur Minchuk	(Russia) Victoria Sinitsina / Ruslan Zhiganshin
7	(Russia) Zhan Bush	(United States) Kristiene Gong	(United States) Ashley Cain / Joshua Reagan	(Ukraine) Anastasia Galyeta /Alexei Shumski
8	(Russia) Gordei Gorshkov	(United States) ~~Kiri Baga~~ (withdrew)	(Canada) Taylor Steele / Robert Schultz	(Russia) Marina Antipova / Artem Kudashev
Alternates
1st	(Russia) Artur Dmitriev Jr	(China) Li Zijun (called up)	(Canada) Brittany Jones / Kurtis Gaskell (called up)	(France) Tiffany Zahorski/Alexis Miart
2nd	(United States) Jason Brown	(Belgium) Ira Vannut	(Russia) Tatiana Danilova / Andrei Novoselov	(United States) Anastasia Cannuscio/ Colin McManus
3rd	(Sweden) Alexander Majorov	(Japan) Shion Kokubun	(United States) Kylie Duarte / Colin Grafton	(France) Gabriella Papadakis / Guillaume Cizeron

== Medalists ==
=== Men ===
Competition	Gold	Silver	Bronze	Details
JGP France	(Canada) Andrei Rogozine	(United States) Jason Brown	(United States) Max Aaron	
JGP Romania	(United States) Keegan Messing	(United States) Joshua Farris	(Japan) Keiji Tanaka	
JGP Austria	(China) Yan Han	(Russia) Artem Grigoriev	(Russia) Zhan Bush	
JGP Japan	(Canada) Andrei Rogozine	(United States) Max Aaron	(Kazakhstan) Abzal Rakimgaliev	
JGP England	(United States) Joshua Farris	(Russia) Zhan Bush	(Canada) Liam Firus	
JGP Germany	(United States) Richard Dornbush	(Russia) Gordei Gorshkov	(Japan) Ryuichi Kihara	
JGP Czech Rep.	(China) Yan Han	(Russia) Artur Dmitriev Jr	(Sweden) Alexander Majorov	
JGP Final	(United States) Richard Dornbush	(China) Yan Han	(Canada) Andrei Rogozine	

=== Ladies ===
Competition	Gold	Silver	Bronze	Details
JGP France	(Russia) Polina Shelepen	(United States) Yasmin Siraj	(Russia) Rosa Sheveleva	
JGP Romania	(Russia) Elizaveta Tuktamysheva	(United States) Kristiene Gong	(Japan) Shion Kokubun	
JGP Austria	(Russia) Adelina Sotnikova	(United States) Christina Gao	(China) Li Zijun	
JGP Japan	(Japan) Risa Shoji	(United States) Kiri Baga	(China) Kexin Zhang	
JGP England	(Russia) Adelina Sotnikova	(United States) Yasmin Siraj	(Japan) Yuki Nishino	
JGP Germany	(Russia) Elizaveta Tuktamysheva	(United States) Christina Gao	(Belgium) Ira Vannut	
JGP Czech Rep.	(United States) Vanessa Lam	(Japan) Risa Shoji	(Russia) Polina Shelepen	
JGP Final	(Russia) Adelina Sotnikova	(Russia) Elizaveta Tuktamysheva	(China) Li Zijun	

=== Pairs ===
Competition	Gold	Silver	Bronze	Details
JGP France	No pairs competition held			
JGP Romania	No pairs competition held			
JGP Austria	(Russia) Ksenia Stolbova / Fedor Klimov	(China) Sui Wenjing / Han Cong	(China) Yu Xiaoyu / Jin Yang	
JGP Japan	No pairs competition held			
JGP England	(Russia) Ksenia Stolbova / Fedor Klimov	(Japan) Narumi Takahashi / Mervin Tran	(Canada) Natasha Purich / Raymond Schultz	
JGP Germany	(China) Sui Wenjing / Han Cong	(Japan) Narumi Takahashi / Mervin Tran	(Russia) Anna Silaeva / Artur Minchuk	
JGP Czech Rep.	(China) Yu Xiaoyu / Jin Yang	(United States) Ashley Cain / Joshua Reagan	(Canada) Natasha Purich / Raymond Schultz	
JGP Final	(Japan) Narumi Takahashi / Mervin Tran	(Russia) Ksenia Stolbova / Fedor Klimov	(China) Yu Xiaoyu / Jin Yang	

=== Ice dance ===
Competition	Gold	Silver	Bronze	Details
JGP France	(Russia) Alexandra Stepanova / Ivan Bukin	(United States) Anastasia Cannuscio/ Colin McManus	(Russia) Evgenia Kosigina / Nikolai Moroshkin	
JGP Romania	(Russia) Ksenia Monko / Kirill Khaliavin	(Ukraine) Anastasia Galyeta / Alexei Shumski	(United States) Lauri Bonacorsi / Travis Mager	
JGP Austria	(United States) Charlotte Lichtman / Dean Copely	(Russia) Victoria Sinitsina / Ruslan Zhiganshin	(France) Gabriella Papadakis / Guillaume Cizeron	
JGP Japan	(Russia) Alexandra Stepanova / Ivan Bukin	(Russia) Ekaterina Pushkash / Jonathan Guerreiro	(France) Géraldine Bott / Neil Brown	
JGP England	(Russia) Ksenia Monko / Kirill Khaliavin	(Russia) Victoria Sinitsina / Ruslan Zhiganshin	(Canada) Nicole Orford / Thomas Williams	
JGP Germany	(Russia) Evgenia Kosigina/ Nikolai Moroshkin	(Russia) Marina Antipova / Artem Kudashev	(United States) Charlotte Lichtman / Dean Copely	
JGP Czech Rep.	(Russia) Ekaterina Pushkash / Jonathan Guerreiro	(France) Tiffany Zahorski / Alexis Miart	(Ukraine) Anastasia Galyeta / Alexei Shumski	
JGP Final	(Russia) Ksenia Monko / Kirill Khaliavin	(Russia) Victoria Sinitsina / Ruslan Zhiganshin	(Russia) Alexandra Stepanova / Ivan Bukin	

== Medals table ==
The following is the table of total medals earned by each country on the 2010–2011 Junior Grand Prix. It can be sorted by country name, number of gold medals, number of silver medals, number of bronze medals, and total medals overall. The table is numbered by number of total medals.

Rank	Nation	Gold	Silver	Bronze	Total
1	Russia (RUS)	15	11	6	32
2	United States (USA)	6	11	3	20
3	China (CHN)	4	2	5	11
4	Japan (JPN)	2	3	4	9
5	Canada (CAN)	2	0	5	7
6	France (FRA)	0	1	2	3
7	Ukraine (UKR)	0	1	1	2
8	Belgium (BEL)	0	0	1	1
8	Kazakhstan (KAZ)	0	0	1	1
8	Sweden (SWE)	0	0	1	1
Totals (10 entries)		29	29	29	87

== Top JGP scores ==
Top scores attained in Junior Grand Prix competitions.

=== Men ===
Rank	Name	Nation	Score	Event
1	Richard Dornbush	United States	219.56	2010–11 JGP Final
2	Han Yan	China	193.62	2010 JGP Czech Republic
3	Andrei Rogozine	Canada	188.60	2010 JGP Japan
4	Joshua Farris	United States	187.74	2010 JGP Great Britain
5	Keegan Messing	United States	187.38	2010 JGP Romania
6	Gordei Gorshkov	Russia	185.84	2010 JGP Germany
7	Artur Dmitriev	Russia	185.73	2010 JGP Czech Republic
8	Max Aaron	United States	181.28	2010–11 JGP Final
9	Alexander Majorov	Sweden	180.73	2010 JGP Czech Republic
10	Jason Brown	United States	180.57	2010 JGP France

=== Ladies ===
Rank	Name	Nation	Score	Event
1	Adelina Sotnikova	Russia	178.97	2010 JGP Austria
2	Elizaveta Tuktamisheva	Russia	172.78	2010 JGP Germany
3	Christina Gao	United States	167.14	2010 JGP Austria
4	Yasmin Siraj	United States	161.75	2010 JGP Great Britain
5	Vanessa Lam	United States	156.41	2010 JGP Czech Republic
6	Risa Shoji	Japan	155.23	2010 JGP Czech Republic
7	Polina Shelepen	Russia	152.92	2010 JGP Czech Republic
8	Zijun Li	China	149.82	2010–11 JGP Final
9	Ira Vannut	Belgium	141.87	2010 JGP Germany
10	Rosa Sheveleva	Russia	139.54	2010 JGP France

=== Pairs ===
Rank	Name	Nation	Score	Event
1	Wenjing Sui / Cong Han	China	167.13	2010 JGP Germany
2	Ksenia Stolbova / Fedor Klimov	Russia	159.79	2010 JGP Austria
3	Narumi Takahashi / Mervin Tran	Japan	159.52	2010–11 JGP Final
4	Yu Xiaoyu / Jin Yang	China	140.58	2010–11 JGP Final
5	Ashley Cain / Joshua Reagan	United States	134.14	2010 JGP Czech Republic
6	Taylor Steele / Robert Schultz	Canada	133.08	2010–11 JGP Final
7	Natasha Purich / Raymond Schultz	Canada	131.77	2010 JGP Czech Republic
8	Brittany Jones / Kurtis Gaskell	Canada	131.04	2010–11 JGP Final
9	Anna Silaeva / Artur Minchuk	Russia	131.03	2010 JGP Germany
10	Ekaterina Petaikina / Maxim Kurduykov	Russia	125.39	2010 JGP Czech Republic

=== Ice dance ===
Rank	Name	Nation	Score	Event
1	Ksenia Monko / Kirill Khaliavin	Russia	155.04	2010 JGP Great Britain
2	Ekaterina Pushkash / Jonathan Guerreiro	Russia	136.80	2010 JGP Czech Republic
3	Victoria Sinitsina / Ruslan Zhiganshin	Russia	134.62	2010–11 JGP Final
4	Alexandra Stepanova / Ivan Bukin	Russia	130.08	2010 JGP Japan
5	Charlotte Lichtman / Dean Copely	United States	129.96	2010 JGP Austria
6	Tiffany Zahorski / Alexis Miart	France	127.82	2010 JGP Czech Republic
7	Evgenia Kosigina / Nikolai Moroshkin	Russia	126.92	2010 JGP Germany
8	Anastasia Galyeta / Alexei Shumski	Ukraine	124.65	2010 JGP Romania
9	Marina Antipova / Artem Kudashev	Russia	123.83	2010 JGP Czech Republic
10	Géraldine Bott / Neil Brown	France	123.65	2010 JGP Japan
