= Alexis Miart =

French ice dancer (born 1992)

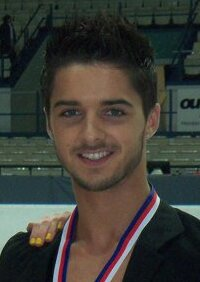
- Miart at the 2010 Ostrava JGP.

Personal information
- Full name: Alexis Denis Miart
- Born: 20 February 1992 (age 34) L'isle-Adam, Paris, France
- Height: 1.77 m (5 ft 9 1/2 in)

Figure skating career
- Country: France

Alexis Miart (born 20 February 1992) is a French former ice dancer. With former partner Tiffany Zahorski, he placed 4th at the 2011 World Junior Championships.

== Personal life ==
Miart was born in L'isle-Adam, Paris, France. He has two older brothers. He currently lives and trains in Lyon.

== Career ==
=== Early career ===
Miart started skating at the age of 8. He came to figure skating by mistake, when he thought he'd been invited to attend an ice hockey lesson. Miart began in single skating, training alongside Florent Amodio, at the Cergy rink, just outside Paris. He became known as the 'Showman from Cergy' and was advised that his skills were better suited to ice dancing. Consequently, in September 2008, Miart relocated to Lyon to commence dance training with Muriel Zazoui and Romain Haguenauer.

=== Partnership with Zahorski ===
Miart teamed up with Tiffany Zahorski in March 2009. They placed 4th at the 2011 World Junior Championships, with a second-place finish in the free dance. They elected to compete in the senior ranks the following season. In early July 2011, Miart sustained a fracture to the right malleolus. Zahorski trained alone for two and a half months while he recuperated. They consequently missed the 2011 fall season, but returned to competition in time for the 2012 French Nationals. After winning the bronze medal there, they were named to the French team to the 2012 European Championships. In the preliminary round at Europeans, an aborted lift and both skaters falling on another lift cost them almost twenty points and qualification to the short dance.

Zahorski and Miart received an assignment to the 2012 Trophée Eric Bompard but withdrew. On 9 November 2012, it was confirmed that their partnership had ended.

== Programs ==
(with Zahorski)

Season	Short dance	Free dance	Exhibition
2011–2012	Marcia Baila by Les Rita Mitsouko	Grease: Summer Nights; Hopelessly Devoted to You; You're the One That I Want	
2010–2011	Viennese waltz: J'envoie Valser by Zazie	I like it like that by Pete Rodriguez; Ain't No Sunshine by Bill Withers; Mujer Latina by Thalia	The Fifth Element by Éric Serra
	Original dance		
2009–2010	Folk dance: Flamenco medley	The Fifth Element by Éric Serra	

== Competitive highlights ==
(with Zahorski)

Results
International
Event	09–10	10–11	11–12	12–13
Europeans			9th PR	
GP Bompard			WD	WD
Nebelhorn				WD
Trophy of Lyon		2nd J.	1st	
International: Junior
Junior Worlds		4th		
JGP Final		1st A		
JGP Belarus	10th			
JGP Czech		2nd		
JGP Romania		4th		
NRW Trophy	5th J.	1st J.		
National
French Champ.	4th J.	3rd J.	3rd	
Master's	4th J.	3rd J.		
Spanish Champ.	3rd J. G			
J. = Junior level GP = Grand Prix; JGP = Junior Grand Prix; A = Alternate; G = Guest; PR = Preliminary round; WD = Withdrew
