= Ruslan Zhiganshin =

Russian ice dancer (born 1992)

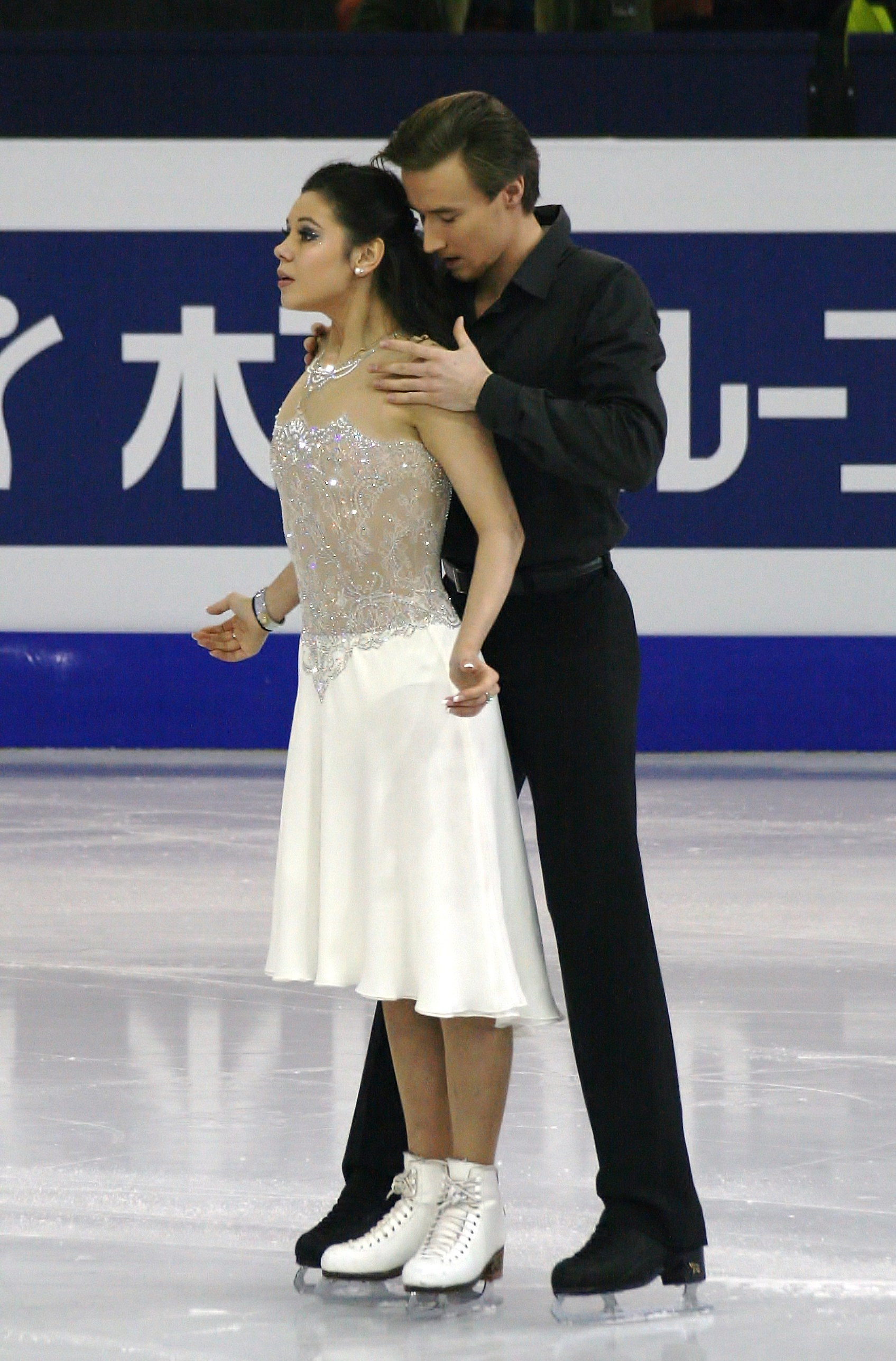
- Ilinykh and Zhiganshin at the 2014–15 Grand Prix Final

Personal information
- Full name: Ruslan Nailevich Zhiganshin
- Born: 25 September 1992 (age 34) Moscow, Russia
- Height: 1.77 m (5 ft 10 in)

Figure skating career
- Country: Russia
- Partner: Elena Ilinykh
- Coach: Elena Kustarova, Svetlana Alexeeva, Olga Riabinina
- Skating club: Sport School No. 2
- Began skating: 1996
- Retired: May 18, 2017
Medal record
Figure skating: Ice dancing
Representing Russia (with Ilinykh)
World Team Trophy
Silver medal – second place	2015 Tokyo	Team
Representing Russia (with Sinitsina)
World Junior Championships
Gold medal – first place	2012 Minsk	Ice dancing
Junior Grand Prix Final
Gold medal – first place	2011–12 Quebec	Ice dancing
Silver medal – second place	2010–11 Beijing	Ice dancing

Ruslan Nailevich Zhiganshin (Russian: Руслан Наильевич Жиганшин; born 25 September 1992) is a retired Russian ice dancer. With partner Elena Ilinykh, he is the 2015 Russian national champion.

With former partner Victoria Sinitsina, he is the 2012 World Junior champion and won bronze medals at the 2013 Winter Universiade, 2012 Rostelecom Cup, and 2014 Russian Championships. They placed seventh at the 2014 World Championships.

== Personal life ==
Ruslan Zhiganshin was born on 25 September 1992 in Moscow. He is the brother of Nelli Zhiganshina, a former competitive ice dancer for Germany.

== Early years on the ice ==
Zhiganshin became interested in skating after his mother took him along to his sister's practices. Having taken up ice dancing at age nine, he had one partner before becoming partnerless for a year.

== Partnership with Sinitsina ==
Zhiganshin and Victoria Sinitsina met in a group led by Irina Lobacheva and Ilia Averbukh but soon joined Elena Kustarova and Svetlana Alexeeva. They trained mostly in Moscow. From 2010 to 2012, they also went to summer training camps in Ventspils, Latvia.

=== Junior ===
Sinitsina/Zhiganshin debuted on the Junior Grand Prix circuit at the 2008 Merano Cup where they finished sixth. The following JGP season, they placed fifth at both of their events.

They won a pair of silver medals during the 2010–11 JGP season and qualified for the JGP Final. At the Final, they won the short dance and placed second in the free dance to take the silver behind Ksenia Monko / Kirill Khaliavin. They withdrew from the 2011 Russian Junior Championships due to Sinitsina's illness.

In the 2011–12 season, Sinitsina/Zhiganshin won gold at the Junior Grand Prix event in Poland, their first JGP title. They won another title in Austria to qualify for their second JGP Final. At the Junior Grand Prix Final, they placed first in both segments and won the title. They then took gold at the 2012 Russian Junior Championships. Sinitsina/Zhiganshin won the 2012 World Junior title. They were first in both the short and free dance and scored their season's best, 153.81 points.

=== Senior ===
In the 2012–13 season, Sinitsina/Zhiganshin debuted on the senior Grand Prix series. After finishing 6th at the 2012 Cup of China, they then won their first senior GP medal, bronze, at the 2012 Rostelecom Cup. The duo finished 5th in their senior national debut at the 2013 Russian Championships.

In 2013–14, Sinitsina/Zhiganshin started their season at the Ice Star in Minsk, Belarus, winning the silver medal behind Bobrova/Soloviev. At their sole Grand Prix assignment, the 2013 NHK Trophy, they had a bad fall while practicing a lift. They finished eighth at the event. After taking the bronze medal at the 2013 Winter Universiade in Trentino, Italy, they stepped onto the senior national podium for the first time at the 2014 Russian Championships. Competing against Riazanova/Tkachenko for Russia's third Olympic spot, Sinitsina/Zhiganshin finished ahead at nationals and then at the 2014 European Championships in Budapest. They came in fourth at the latter event, their senior ISU Championship debut.

Along with Ilinykh/Katsalapov and Bobrova/Soloviev, Sinitsina/Zhiganshin were selected to represent Russia at the Winter Olympics, held in February 2014 in Sochi. They finished 16th at the Olympics, behind a number of teams they had surpassed at Europeans, but rebounded the next month at the 2014 World Championships. They placed eighth in both segments and finished seventh overall in Saitama, Japan. In early April 2014, Sinitsina left to skate with Nikita Katsalapov.

== Partnership with Ilinykh ==
Soon after, in early April 2014, Zhiganshin's coaches invited Katsalapov's former partner, Elena Ilinykh, to try out with their student. Coached by Elena Kustarova in Moscow, Ilinykh/Zhiganshin began training together in an unofficial partnership — the Russian federation having decided to give Ilinykh/Katsalapov time to reconcile — and received approval at the end of May.

=== 2014–15 season ===
For the 2014–15 Grand Prix season, Ilinykh/Zhiganshin were assigned to Cup of China and Rostelecom Cup. Making their international debut, they placed fourth at Cup of China and then won the silver medal behind Americans Madison Chock / Evan Bates at Rostelecom Cup. They qualified for the Grand Prix Final in their first season as a team. At the GPF in Barcelona, they placed sixth in the short dance, fourth in the free dance, and sixth overall. At the 2015 Russian Championships, Ilinykh/Ziganshin won their first national title.

=== 2015–16 season ===
Ilinykh/Zhiganshin began their season at the Mordovian Ornament, which they won with new personal bests in all segments. For the 2015–16 Grand Prix season, they were once again assigned to Cup of China and Rostelecom Cup. They won the bronze at Cup of China behind Italians Anna Cappellini / Luca Lanotte and Americans Madison Chock / Evan Bates. Their next competition they finished 5th at the 2015 Rostelecom Cup. On December 24–27, Ilinykh/Zhiganshin competed at the 2016 Russian Championships, where they finished 4th behind Alexandra Stepanova / Ivan Bukin after placing fourth in the short dance and second in the free dance.

Ilinykh/Zhiganshin decided to fly to Michigan on 27 February 2016 to work with Igor Shpilband.

=== 2016–17 season ===
They finished fourth at the 2017 Russian Championships, losing the bronze to Sinisina/Katsalapov by 0.17. They had a one-point deduction after part of their costume fell onto the ice.

Zhiganshin decided to retire from competition due to a spinal injury.

== Programs ==
=== With Ilinykh ===
Season	Short dance	Free dance	Exhibition
2016–2017	Blues: Big Bad Love by Ray Charles and Diana Ross; Swing: Sing Sing Sing by Louis Prima	Slumdog Millionaire (soundtrack); Ang Laga De by Aditi Paul	
2015–2016	Waltz: Queen medley: Somebody to Love; We Will Rock You choreo. by Alexey Arapov	Frida by Elliot Goldenthal choreo. by Antonio Najarro	I Put a Spell on You performed by Annie Lennox
2014–2015	Pasodoble: Carmen Suite: Aragonaise; Torrero choreo. by Antonio Najarro by Georges Bizet	Appassionata by Secret Garden; Anthony and Cleopatra Theme (from "Cleopatra") by Ferrante & Teicher choreo. by Ilia Averbukh	Je T'aime by Lara Fabian; Love Like A Dream by Alla Pugacheva

=== With Sinitsina ===
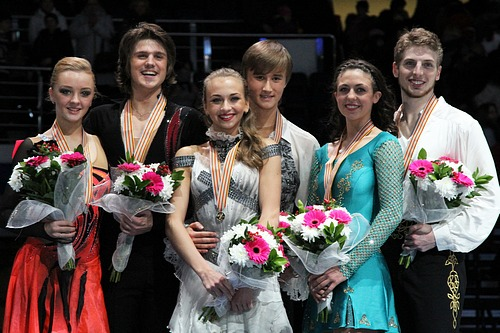
Sinitsina and Zhiganshin, gold medalists at the 2012 World Junior Championships

Season	Short dance	Free dance	Exhibition
2013–2014	Quickstep: Let the Good Times Roll; Swing: Swing Baby	Norma by Vincenzo Bellini choreo. by Ilia Averbukh	
2012–2013	Tennessee Waltz by Eva Cassidy; Witch Doctor	Spiagge Lontane by Sergio Cammariere	Crazy by Aerosmith
2011–2012	Manhã de Carnaval by Elizeth Cardoso; Bla Bla Cha Cha by Petty Booka	The Phantom of the Opera by Andrew Lloyd Webber	
2010–2011	Algo pequeñito by Daniel Diges	Samson and Delilah by Camille Saint-Saëns; S'Apre Per Te Il Mio Cuore by Camille Saint-Saëns sung by Filippa Giordano	
	Original dance		
2009–2010		Tango Of The Night (Noteo) by Pyotr Dranga; Weary Sun by Jerzy Petersburski	

== Competitive highlights ==
GP: Grand Prix; CS: Challenger Series; JGP: Junior Grand Prix

=== With Ilinykh ===
International
Event	2014–15	2015–16	2016–17
Worlds	7th		
Europeans	4th		
GP Final	6th		
GP Bompard			4th
GP Rostelecom Cup	2nd	5th	
GP Cup of China	4th	3rd	
GP Skate America			5th
CS Mordovian Ornament		1st	
CS Tallinn Trophy			1st
National
Russian Champ.	1st	4th	4th
Team events
World Team Trophy	2nd T (4th P)		
TBD = Assigned; WD = Withdrew; T = Team result; P = Personal result; Medals awarded for team result only.

=== With Sinitsina ===
International
Event	07–08	08–09	09–10	10–11	11–12	12–13	13–14
Olympics							16th
Worlds							7th
Europeans							4th
GP Cup of China						6th	
GP NHK Trophy							8th
GP Rostelecom Cup						3rd	
Winter Universiade							3rd
Volvo Open Cup						1st	
Ice Star							2nd
International: Junior
Junior Worlds					1st		
JGP Final				2nd	1st		
JGP Austria				2nd	1st		
JGP Croatia			5th				
JGP Italy		6th					
JGP Poland					1st		
JGP U.K.				2nd			
JGP U.S.			5th				
NRW Trophy		2nd J.					
National
Russian Champ.						5th	3rd
Russian Junior	12th	7th	6th	WD	1st		
J. = Junior level; WD = Withdrew

== Detailed results ==
Small medals for short and free programs awarded only at ISU Championships.

=== With Ilinykh ===
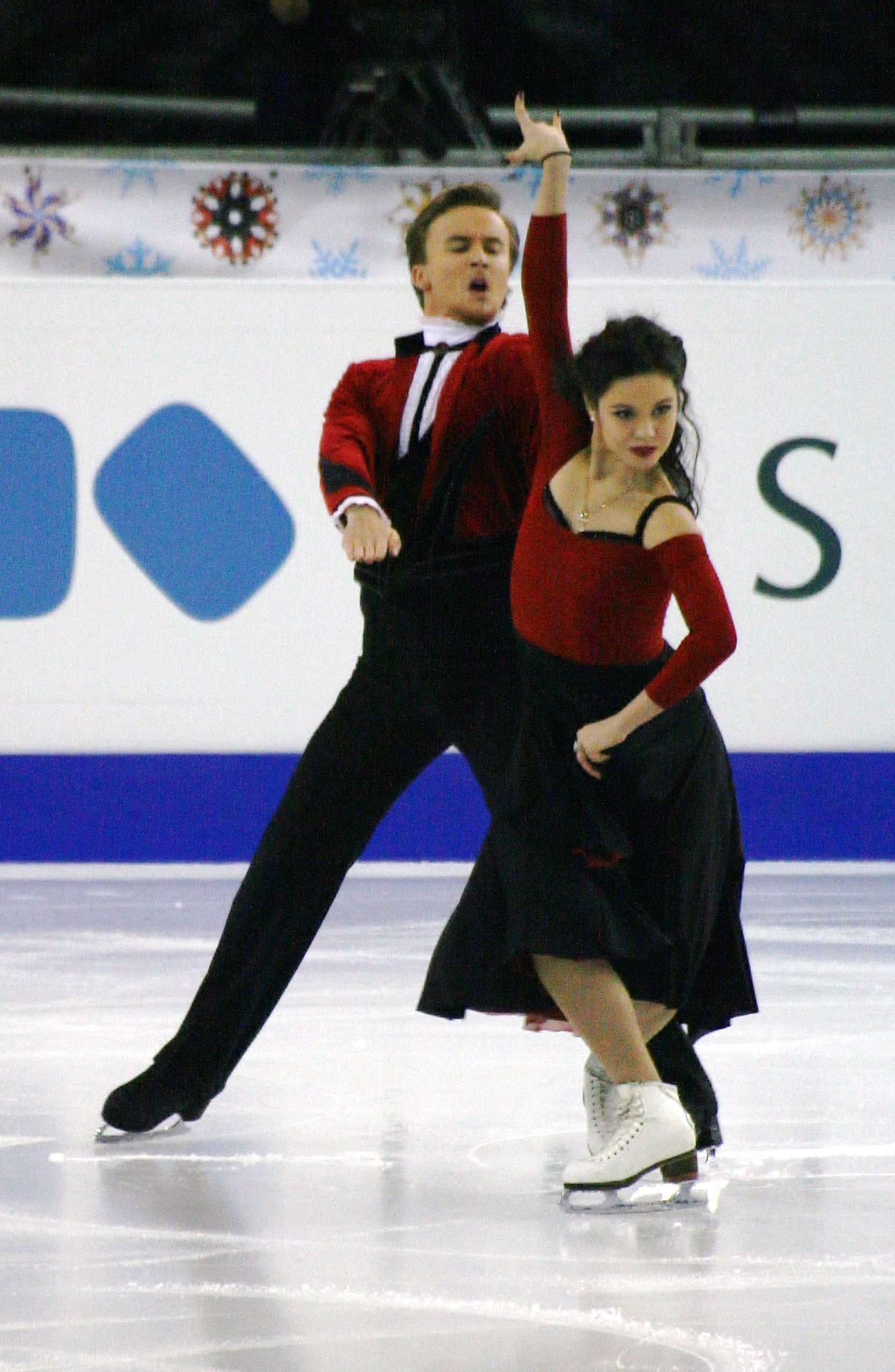
Ilinykh/Zhiganshin at the 2014–15 Grand Prix Final

2016–17 season
Date	Event	SD	FD	Total
22–25 December 2016	2017 Russian Championships	4; 73.22	3; 105.06	4; 178.28
20–27 November 2016	2016 CS Tallinn Trophy	1; 76.04	1; 109.15	1; 185.19
11–13 November 2016	2016 Trophée de France	2; 68.72	4; 98.68	4; 167.40
21–23 October 2016	2016 Skate America	4; 66.60	6; 98.56	5; 165.16
2015–16 season
Date	Event	SD	FD	Total
23–27 December 2015	2016 Russian Championships	4; 66.75	2; 102.97	4; 169.72
20–22 November 2015	2015 Rostelecom Cup	6; 54.46	4; 98.55	5; 153.01
5–8 November 2015	2015 Cup of China	3; 63.54	3; 95.46	3; 159.00
15–18 October 2015	2015 Mordovian Ornament	1; 70.12	1; 106.58	1; 176.70
2014–15 season
Date	Event	SD	FD	Total
16–19 April 2015	2015 World Team Trophy	4; 63.09	4; 95.10	2T/4P; 158.19
23–29 March 2015	2015 World Championships	5; 69.46	9; 95.38	7; 164.84
26 Jan. - 1 Feb. 2015	2015 European Championships	2; 69.94	8; 89.89	4; 159.83
25–28 December 2014	2015 Russian Championships	1; 70.35	2; 101.06	1; 171.41
11–14 December 2014	2014 Grand Prix Final	6; 60.25	4; 96.21	6; 156.46
14–16 November 2014	2014 Rostelecom Cup	2; 64.12	3; 96.31	2; 160.43
7–9 November 2014	2014 Cup of China	4; 60.48	4; 84.22	4; 144.70

=== With Sinitsina ===
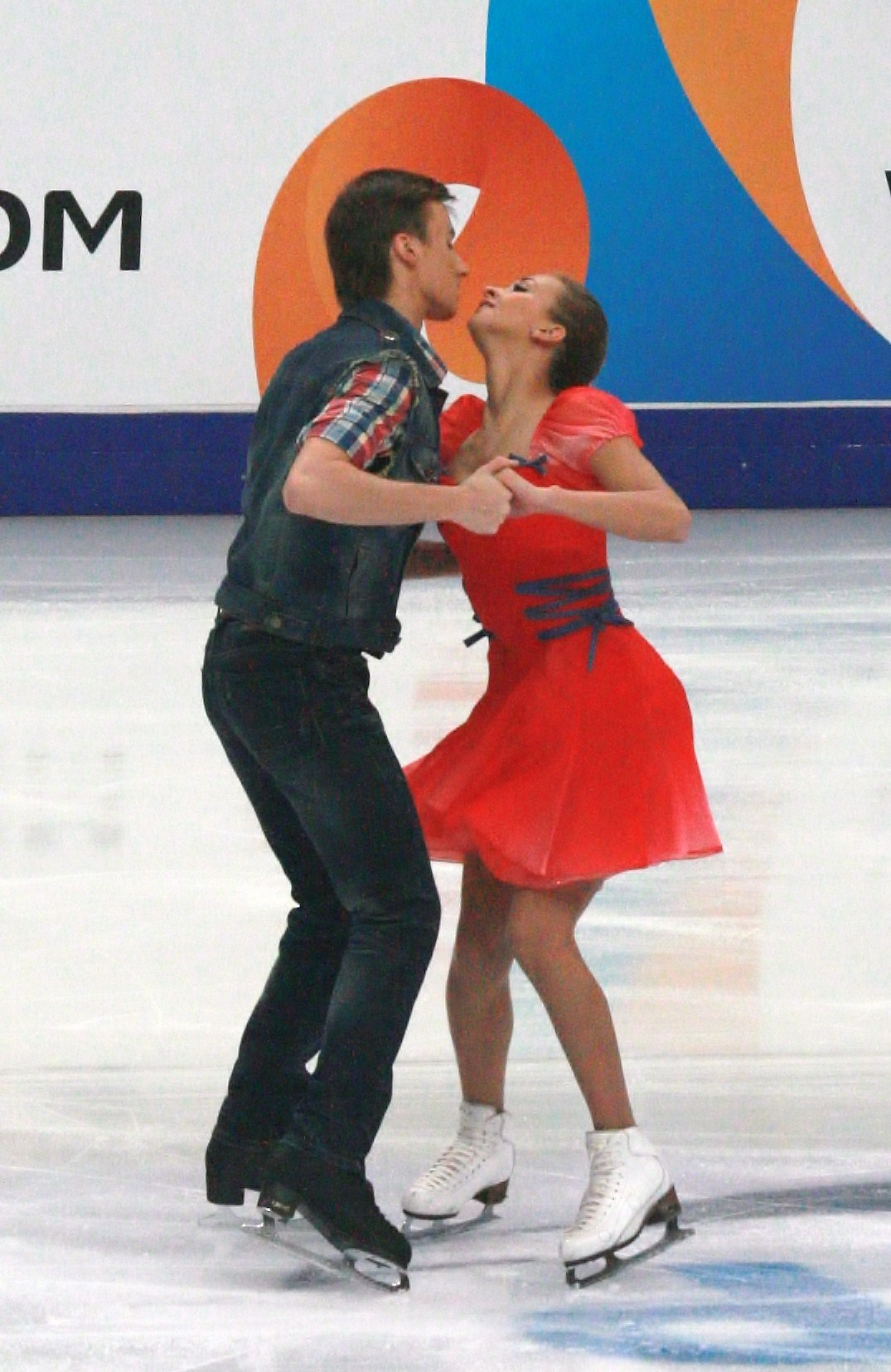
Sinitsina/Zhiganshin at the 2012 Rostelecom Cup

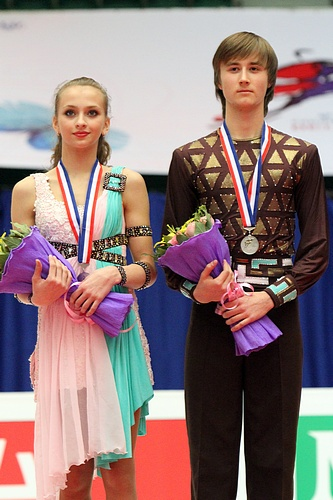
Sinitsina/Zhiganshin at the 2010–11 JGP Final

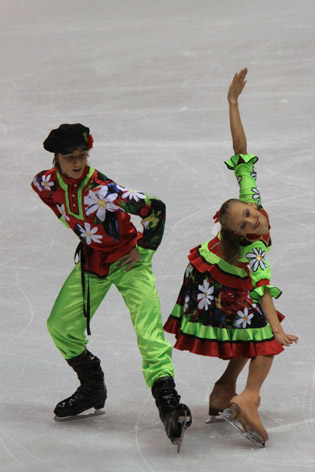
Sinitsina/Zhiganshin at the 2009 JGP Lake Placid

2013–14 season
Date	Event	Level	SD	FD	Total
24–30 March 2014	2014 World Championships	Senior	8; 62.11	8; 93.24	7; 155.35
16–17 February 2014	2014 Winter Olympics	Senior	16; 58.01	17; 82.65	16; 140.66
15–19 January 2014	2014 European Championships	Senior	4; 60.63	4; 93.10	4; 153.73
24–25 December 2013	2014 Russian Championships	Senior	3; 67.08	3; 98.52	3; 165.60
13–14 December 2013	2013 Winter Universiade	Senior	2; 57.05	5; 85.45	3; 142.50
8–10 November 2013	2013 NHK Trophy	Senior	8; 44.34	7; 79.89	8; 124.23
18–20 October 2013	2013 Ice Star	Senior	2; 63.05	2; 97.17	2; 160.22
2012–13 season
Date	Event	Level	SD	FD	Total
10–13 January 2013	2013 Volvo Open Cup	Senior	1; 64.67	1; 97.77	1; 162.44
25–28 December 2012	2013 Russian Championships	Senior	4; 60.03	4; 93.94	5; 153.97
9–10 November 2012	2012 Rostelecom Cup	Senior	3; 60.85	4; 84.23	3; 145.08
2–3 November 2012	2012 Cup of China	Senior	6; 55.09	5; 82.37	6; 137.46
2011–12 season
Date	Event	Level	SD	FD	Total
27 Feb. – 4 March 2012	2012 World Junior Championships	Junior	1; 63.78	1; 90.03	1; 153.81
5–7 February 2012	2012 Russian Junior Championships	Junior	1; 66.28	1; 91.95	1; 158.23
8–11 December 2011	2011–12 JGP Final	Junior	1; 60.47	1; 87.06	1; 147.53
15–17 September 2011	2011 JGP Poland	Junior	1; 56.83	1; 83.48	1; 140.31
8–10 September 2011	2011 JGP Austria	Junior	1; 61.74	1; 89.36	1; 151.10
2010–11 season
Date	Event	Level	SD	FD	Total
9–12 December 2010	2010–11 JGP Final	Junior	1; 55.58	2; 79.04	2; 134.62
1–2 October 2010	2010 JGP Great Britain	Junior	2; 53.52	2; 80.34	2; 133.86
15–19 September 2010	2010 JGP Austria	Junior	2; 50.46	2; 76.16	2; 126.62

2009–10 season
Date	Event	Level	CD	OD	FD	Total
3–6 February 2010	2010 Russian Junior Championships	Junior	7; 31.25	5; 52.14	5; 77.12	6; 160.51
7–11 October 2009	2009 JGP Croatia	Junior	4; 29.41	4; 45.38	5; 68.00	5; 142.79
2–6 September 2009	2009 JGP United States	Junior	3; 29.87	7; 43.50	5; 69.03	5; 142.40
2008–09 season
Date	Event	Level	CD	OD	FD	Total
28–31 January 2009	2009 Russian Junior Championships	Junior	7 –	7 –	7 –	7; 147.35
31 Oct. – 2 Nov. 2008	2008 NRW Trophy	Junior	2 –	2 –	1 –	2; 146.93
3–7 September 2008	2008 JGP Italy	Junior	7; 25.39	5; 43.74	6; 66.04	6; 135.17
2007–08 season
Date	Event	Level	CD	OD	FD	Total
30 Jan. – 2 Feb. 2008	2008 Russian Junior Championships	Junior	12 –	12 –	12 –	12; 126.93
