= Charlotte Lichtman =

American ice dancer

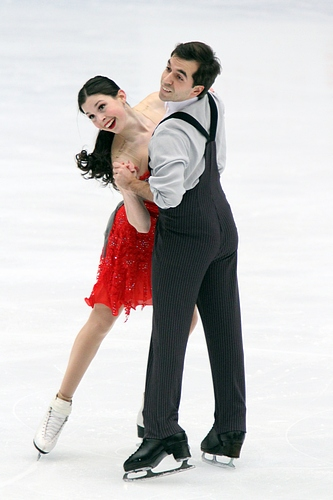
- Lichtman & Copely at the 2010–2011 JGP Final

Personal information
- Born: March 26, 1993 (age 33) Detroit, Michigan, U.S.
- Home town: Northville, Michigan, U.S.
- Height: 5 ft 5 in (1.65 m)

Figure skating career
- Country: United States
- Coach: Igor Shpilband; Marina Zueva
- Skating club: Arctic FSC
- Began skating: 1999

Charlotte Lichtman (born March 26, 1993, in Detroit) is an American former competitive ice dancer. With former partner Dean Copely, she is the 2011 World Junior bronze medalist and U.S. Junior champion.

== Career ==
Charlotte Lichtman began skating in 1999. She was a singles skater until the age of 14 and competed up to the novice level. She teamed up with Dean Copely after the 2008 Lake Placid Ice Dancing Championships. They trained in Canton, Michigan with Igor Shpilband and Marina Zueva. They began competing on the ISU Junior Grand Prix series during the 2009–10 season.

Lichtman and Copely won gold and bronze medals on the 2010–2011 ISU Junior Grand Prix series, and qualified for the JGP Final where they finished 5th. They won the U.S. Junior Championships. At Junior Worlds they won a bronze medal.

Lichtman and Copely announced the end of their partnership on April 27, 2012.

== Programs ==
(with Copely)

Season	Short dance	Free dance
2011–2012	Mambo No. 5 by Lou Bega; Perhaps, Perhaps, Perhaps by Doris Day	Austin Powers
2010–2011	That's Amore; An Evening in Rome by Dean Martin	Beetlejuice: The Book; Travel Music; Obituaries; Main Title by Danny Elfman
	Original dance	
2009–2010	Georgian folk: Lezginka; Suliko	Limelight by Charlie Chaplin
2008–2009	Crazy for You by George Gershwin: I've Got Rhythm; Embraceable You	The Mask of Zorro by James Horner

== Competitive highlights ==
(with Copely)

Results
International
Event	2008–09	2009–10	2010–11	2011–12
GP Cup of China				7th
International: Junior
Junior Worlds			3rd	
JGP Final			5th	
JGP Austria			1st	
JGP Croatia		4th		
JGP Germany			3rd	
JGP Hungary		8th		
National
U.S. Championships	9th J.	8th J.	1st J.	10th
Pacific Coast Sectionals	2nd J.	1st J.		
GP = Grand Prix; JGP = Junior Grand Prix; J. = Junior level
