= Christina Gao =

American figure skater

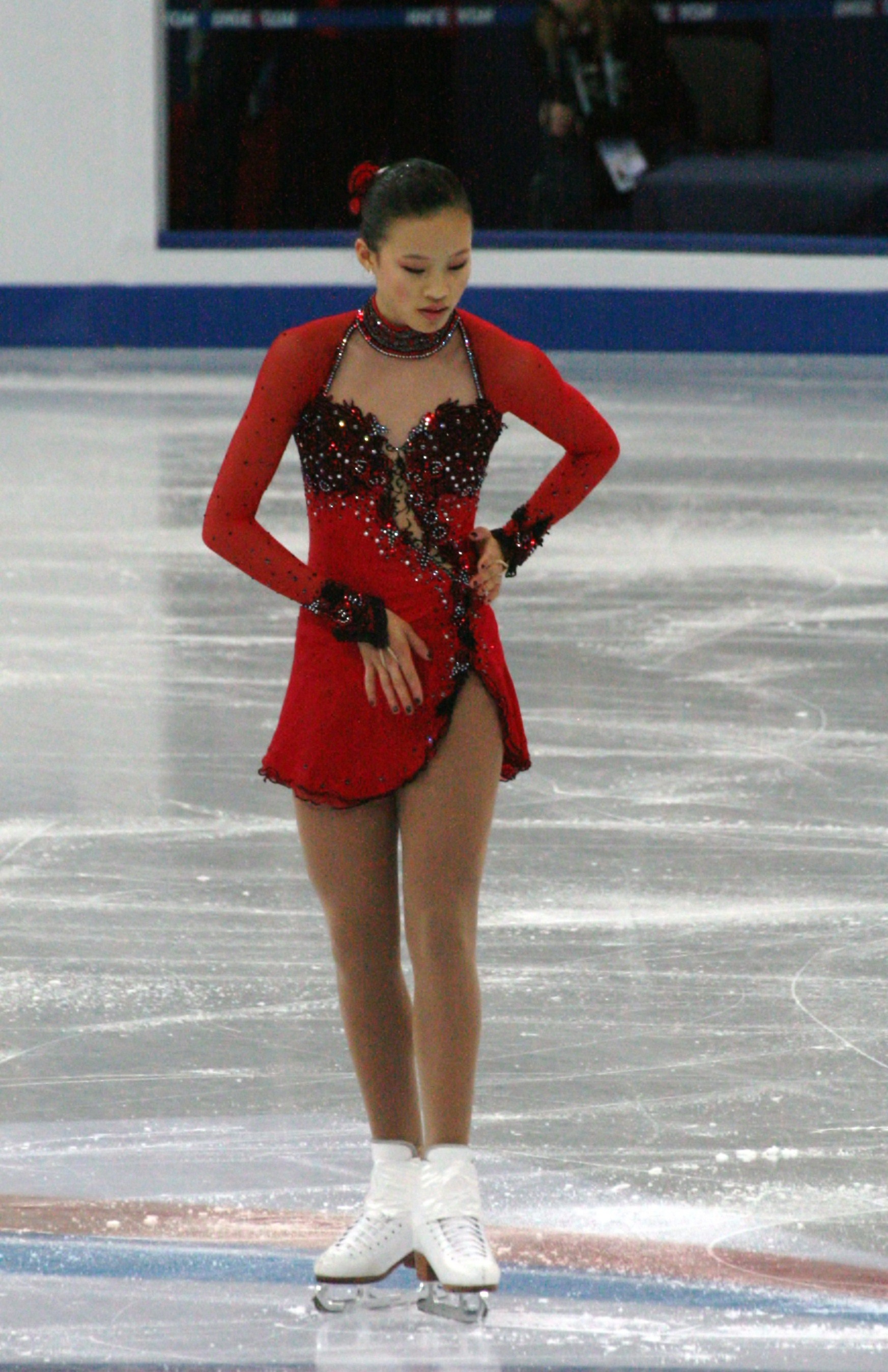
- Christina Gao competing in the 2012-13 Grand Prix Final

Personal information
- Full name: Christina Gao
- Born: March 7, 1994 (age 32) Cincinnati, Ohio, U.S.
- Height: 5 ft 6 in (1.68 m)

Figure skating career
- Country: United States
- Coach: Mark Mitchell; Peter Johansson
- Skating club: Skating Club of Boston
- Began skating: 2001
- Retired: June 17, 2015
Medal record
Figure skating: Ladies' singles
Representing United States
Junior Grand Prix Final
Bronze medal – third place	2009–10 Tokyo	Ladies' singles

Christina Gao (born March 7, 1994) is an American former figure skater. She is the 2012 Skate America silver medalist, the 2009 Junior Grand Prix Final bronze medalist, and the 2009 U.S. Junior bronze medalist.

== Personal life ==
Christina Gao was born in Cincinnati, Ohio. Her name in Chinese: 高昊; pinyin: Gāo Hào. Her father was a junior national badminton champion in China.

Gao spent several years in Toronto, Ontario, Canada, before moving to Boston in 2012. She was a National Merit semifinalist. In the summer of 2012, she worked at a hospital shadowing a gastroenterologist. In the fall, she began studying at Harvard University, taking a full course load. She graduated in 2017.

== Career ==
=== Early career ===
Gao began skating at age 7. Early in her career, she trained in northern Kentucky, coached by Stephanie Miller and Ted Masdea.

In the 2004–2005 season, competing on the Juvenile level, Gao won the silver medal at her regional championship to qualify for the United States Junior Championships, where she placed 12th. She moved up to the Intermediate level the following year and won the pewter medal at her regional championship to qualify for the United States Junior Championships, where she placed 11th in her qualifying group and did not advance to the final. She moved up to the Novice level for the 2006–2007 season and placed 13th at her regional championship and did not qualify to her sectional championship.

In the 2007–2008 season, competing again on the novice level, Gao won both her regional and sectional championship to qualify for the 2008 U.S. Championships, where she finished 12th.

The following season, Gao moved up to the junior level. She won the silver medal at her regional championship and the gold medal at her sectional championship to qualify for the 2009 U.S. Championships. At Nationals, she placed third in the short program and second in the free skating, winning the bronze medal overall.

=== 2009–2010 season ===
Due to limited ice time in Kentucky, Gao relocated before the 2009–10 season to Toronto, where she was coached by Brian Orser, the 1984 and 1988 Olympic silver medalist, at the Toronto Cricket, Skating and Curling Club. Gao made her ISU Junior Grand Prix debut in the 2009–10 season. She won the bronze medal at the 2009–10 ISU Junior Grand Prix event in Poland with an overall score of 134.55 points. She had also been assigned to the event in Turkey, where she won another bronze earning 135.01 points.

She qualified for the 2009–10 Junior Grand Prix Final. At the Junior Grand Prix, she placed fifth in the short program with 52.82 points and third in the free skate with 98.65 points, winning the bronze medal overall with a score of 151.47 points. She earned new personal bests in both segments of the competition.

At the 2010 U.S. Championships in January 2010, she placed fifth in the short program with a score 56.26 points and fifth in the free skate with 100.27. She placed 5th overall with 156.53.

She was assigned to compete at the 2010 World Junior Championships. She placed 8th overall.

=== 2010–2011 season ===
Gao was assigned to the 2010–11 ISU Junior Grand Prix events in Austria and Japan. She won the silver medal in her first event with a total of 167.14 points. Gao withdrew from the competition in Japan but was reassigned to Germany based on her result in Austria. She placed second totaling 155.67 points. Those placements qualified her for the 2010–11 ISU Junior Grand Prix Final, where she came in sixth position earning 145.01 points. She finished 5th at the US Championships at the senior level. She was fourth at the 2011 World Junior Championships.

=== 2011–2012 season ===
Gao was assigned to the 2011 Cup of China and 2011 Cup of Russia for the Grand Prix season. She had a hip injury and was off the ice for most of July. At her first event, Cup of China, she came in eighth in the short program with a score of 51.99. She placed fourth in the free skate with a score of 100.47 to finish fifth. At Cup of Russia, she was tenth after the short program with a score of 39.64. She also placed tenth in the free skate with a score of 78.13, to place tenth overall. Gao finished 5th at the 2012 U.S. Nationals Championships. Gao then competed at the 2012 World Junior Championships and finished 7th at the event.

In March 2012, Gao left Toronto and returned to Cincinnati. After a June visit to Boston, Gao decided to train with coaches Mark Mitchell and Peter Johansson at The Skating Club of Boston.

=== 2012-2013 season ===
After winning the silver medal at the 2012 Skate America, Gao placed fourth at the 2012 Trophée Éric Bompard. In late November, ISU officials announced that she would compete at the 2012–13 Grand Prix Final, replacing Yulia Lipnitskaya who withdrew from the event due to injuries. Gao placed sixth at the Grand Prix Final. She was fifth at the 2013 U.S. Championships and was named in the United States team to the 2013 Four Continents in Osaka, Japan where she finished 4th and was the highest ranking American at the event ahead of teammates Gracie Gold and Agnes Zawadzki. After completing her first semester at Harvard University, Gao made the decision to take a year off in order to train full-time for the 2014 Winter Olympics.

=== 2013-2014 season ===
Gao opened her 2013-2014 season by winning the bronze medal at the 2013 Ondrej Nepela Trophy behind Russian Nikol Gosviani. She has been assigned to two events for the 2013–14 ISU Grand Prix series, her first event was at the 2013 Skate Canada where she finished 4th. In her next assignment, Gao finished 8th at the 2013 Trophée Éric Bompard.

Gao was 8th at the 2014 U.S. Figure Skating Championships and therefore did not make the Olympic team.

=== 2014-2015 season ===
After not making the 2014 Olympic team, Gao decided to compete for one more season, despite the objections from those around her. Gao was assigned to the 2014 Cup of China and the 2014 NHK Trophy. At the Cup of China, she was 8th after the short program and 11th after the free skate, placing 9th overall with a score of 125.04 points. At the NHK Trophy, Gao placed 6th in the short program and 10th in the free skate to finish in 9th place overall with a score of 147.51 points.

Gao finished 11th at the 2015 U.S. Figure Skating Championships.

== Programs ==
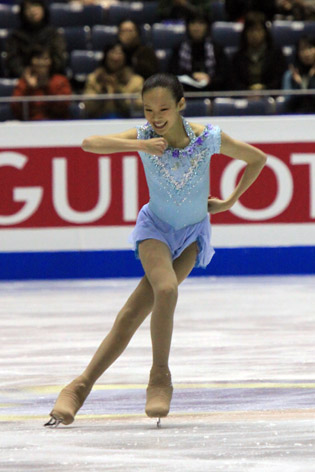
Gao during her free skate to La fille mal gardée at the 2009 JGP Final

Season	Short program	Free skating	Exhibition
2014–2015	River by Emeli Sandé	Angels & Demons by Hans Zimmer	
2013–2014	Close Without Touching by David Arkenstone	Angels & Demons by Hans Zimmer	
2012–2013	Close Without Touching by David Arkenstone	Libertango by Astor Piazzolla choreo. by David Wilson	Ave Maria by Beyoncé
2011–2012	Violin Concerto by Felix Mendelssohn; To Love You More by Lucia Micarelli choreo. by David Wilson	Libertango by Astor Piazzolla choreo. by David Wilson	
2010–2011	Violin Concerto by Felix Mendelssohn choreo. by David Wilson	Yellow River Piano Concerto by Xian Xinghai performed by Yin Chengzong, Chu Wanghua choreo. by David Wilson	Ave Maria by Beyoncé choreo. by David Wilson
2009–2010	Morning Passages from The Hours by Philip Glass choreo. by David Wilson	La fille mal gardée by Ferdinand Hérold choreo. by David Wilson	
2008–2009	Liza's Dance from Stepping Out by Peter Matz choreo. by David Wilson	Paquita by Richard Bonynge performed by the English Concert Orchestra choreo. by David Wilson	
2007–2008	Csárdás by Vittorio Monti	Yellow River Piano Concerto by Xian Xinghai performed by the Slovak Radio Symphony Orchestra	

== Competitive highlights ==
=== 2009–10 season to present ===
International
Event	2009–10	2010–11	2011–12	2012–13	2013–14	2014–15
Four Continents				4th		
Grand Prix Final				6th		
GP Bompard				4th	8th	
GP Cup of China			5th			9th
GP NHK Trophy						9th
GP Rostelecom			10th			
GP Skate America				2nd		
GP Skate Canada					4th	
Ondrej Nepela					3rd	
International: Junior
Junior Worlds	8th	4th	7th			
JGP Final	3rd	6th				
JGP Austria		2nd				
JGP Germany		2nd				
JGP Poland	3rd					
JGP Turkey	3rd					
National
U.S. Champ.	5th	5th	5th	5th	8th	11th
GP = Grand Prix; JGP = Junior Grand Prix; QR = Qualifying round; TBD = Assigned; WD = Withdrew

=== 2004–05 to 2008–09 ===
National
Event	2004–05	2005–06	2006–07	2007–08	2008–09
U.S. Championships				12th N.	3rd J.
U.S. Junior Champ.	12th Jv.	11th I. (QR)			
Midwestern Sectionals				1st N.	1st J.
Eastern Great Lakes Regionals	2nd Jv.	4th I.	13th N.	1st N.	2nd J.
Levels: Jv. = Juvenile; I. = Intermediate; N. = Novice; J.= Junior

== Detailed results ==
(Small medals for short and free programs awarded only at ISU Championships.)

2013–2014 season
Date	Event	Level	SP	FS	Total
January 5–12, 2014	2014 U.S. Championships	Senior	6; 60.91	10; 102.12	8; 163.03
November 15–17, 2013	2013 Trophee Eric Bompard	Senior	4; 58.81	8; 94.04	8; 152.85
October 25–27, 2013	2013 Skate Canada	Senior	4; 62.82	4; 110.8	4; 173.69
October 3–5, 2013	2013 Ondrej Nepela Trophy	Senior	4; 52.14	3; 100.70	3; 152.84
2012–2013 season
Date	Event	Level	SP	FS	Total
February 8–11, 2013	2013 Four Continents	Senior	4; 62.34	5; 113.94	4; 176.28
January 19–27, 2013	2013 U.S. Championships	Senior	5; 58.74	4; 117.54	5; 176.28
December 6–9, 2012	2012-2013 ISU Grand Prix Final	Senior	6; 48.56	6; 105.98	6; 154.54
November 15–18, 2012	2012 Trophee Eric Bompard	Senior	7; 52.55	4; 112.16	4; 164.71
October 19–21, 2012	2012 Skate America	Senior	3; 56.63	2; 117.62	2; 174.25
2011–2012 season
Date	Event	Level	SP	FS	Total
February 27 – March 4, 2012	2012 World Junior Championships	Junior	5; 52.66	7; 98.43	7; 151.09
January 22–29, 2012	2012 U.S. Championships	Senior	6; 54.83	5; 111.53	5; 166.36
November 25–27, 2011	2011 Cup of Russia	Senior	10; 39.64	10; 78.13	10; 117.77
November 4–6, 2011	2011 Cup of China	Senior	8; 51.99	4; 100.49	5; 152.48
2010–2011 season
Date	Event	Level	SP	FS	Total
February 28 – March 6, 2011	2011 World Junior Championships	Junior	3; 56.80	6; 98.47	4; 155.27
January 22 – 30, 2011	2011 U.S. Championships	Senior	5; 58.43	6; 108.77	5; 167.20
December 9–12, 2010	2010–2011 ISU Junior Grand Prix Final	Junior	7; 43.98	3; 101.03	6; 145.01
October 6–10, 2010	2010–2011 ISU Junior Grand Prix, Germany	Junior	2; 47.66	2; 108.01	2; 155.67
September 15–19, 2010	2010–2011 ISU Junior Grand Prix, Austria	Junior	2; 58.07	2; 109.07	2; 167.14
2009–2010 season
Date	Event	Level	SP	FS	Total
March 8–14, 2010	2010 World Junior Championships	Junior	9; 49.34	6; 94.52	8; 143.86
January 14–24, 2010	2010 U.S. Championships	Senior	5; 56.26	5; 100.27	5; 156.53
December 3 – 6, 2009	2009–2010 ISU Junior Grand Prix Final	Junior	5; 52.82	3; 98.65	3; 151.47
October 14–18, 2009	2009 ISU Junior Grand Prix, Turkey	Junior	7; 44.91	1; 90.10	3; 135.01
September 9–12, 2009	2009 ISU Junior Grand Prix, Poland	Junior	3; 50.52	3; 84.03	3; 134.55
2008–2009 season
Date	Event	Level	SP	FS	Total
January 18 – 25, 2009	2009 U.S. Championships	Junior	3; 49.45	2; 79.24	3; 128.69
November 11–15, 2008	2009 Midwestern Sectional Championships	Junior	4; 43.89	1; 85.94	1; 129.83
October 10–14, 2008	2009 Eastern Great Lakes Regionals	Junior	1; 47.01	5; 66.61	2; 113.62
2007–2008 season
Date	Event	Level	SP	FS	Total
January 20–27, 2008	2008 U.S. Championships	Novice	11	11	12; 83.75
November 14–17, 2007	2008 Midwestern Sectional Championships	Novice	3; 41.83	1; 85.34	1; 127.17
October 1–6, 2007	2008 Eastern Great Lakes Regionals	Novice	1; 45.52	1; 73.49	1; 119.01

- SP = Short program; FS = Free skating.
