= Taylor Steele (figure skater) =

Canadian pair skater

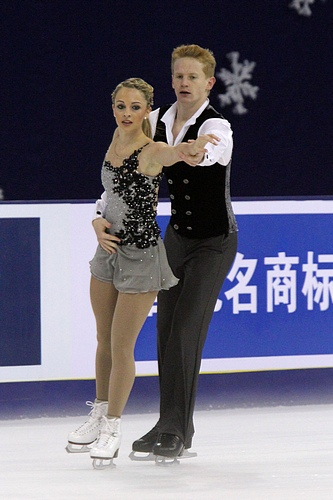

Personal information
- Born: October 5, 1992 (age 34) Sarnia, Ontario
- Home town: Puslinch, Ontario
- Height: 1.55 m (5 ft 1 in)

Figure skating career
- Country: Canada
- Partner: Simon-Pierre Côté
- Coach: Kevin Wheeler
- Skating club: Preston FSC
- Began skating: 1995

Taylor Steele (born October 5, 1992 in Sarnia, Ontario) is a Canadian pair skater. She currently competes with Simon-Pierre Côté. She previously skated with Robert Schultz.

== Programs ==
(with Schultz)

Season	Short program	Free skating
2011–2012	House of the Rising Sun	Piano Concerto in F by George Gershwin: Andante con moto, Adagio; III. Allegretto Agitato
2010–2011	Malèna by Ennio Morricone	Nocturne by Paul Schwartz; Bohemian Rhapsody by Freddie Mercury
2009–2010	Malèna by Ennio Morricone	Street Music by William Russo

== Competitive highlights ==
=== With Côté ===
National
Event	2012–2013
Canadian Championships	6th

=== With Schultz ===
Results
International
Event	2009–2010	2010–2011	2011–2012
GP Cup of China			7th
JGP Final		4th	
JGP Czech Republic		6th	
JGP Germany	9th		
JGP Great Britain		4th	
JGP Poland	5th		
National
Canadians	4th J.	4th J.	5th
GP = Grand Prix; JGP = Junior Grand Prix; J. = Junior level
