= Risa Shōji =

Japanese figure skater

Risa Shoji
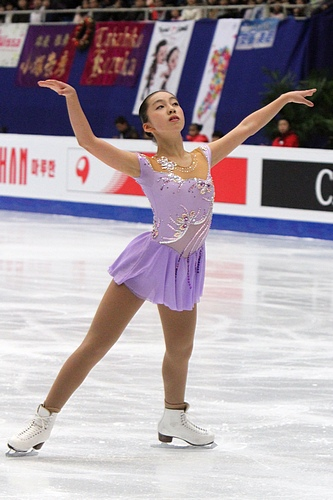
- Shoji at the 2010 Junior Grand Prix Final

Personal information
- Born: 5 July 1996 (age 30) Tokyo, Japan
- Home town: Tokyo
- Height: 1.59 m (5 ft 2 1/2 in)

Figure skating career
- Country: Japan
- Coach: Christy Krall, Reiko Kobayashi
- Skating club: Seibu Higashifushimi FSC
- Began skating: 2002

Risa Shoji (庄司 理紗, Shōji Risa; born July 5, 1996) is a Japanese former figure skater. She won four medals on the ISU Junior Grand Prix series (one gold, three silver) and placed fifth at the 2011 World Junior Championships.

== Career ==
Shoji began skating at age 6 in 2002 after she asked her mother was skating was when passing the rink, then asked if she could try the sport. She was coached by Naoki Shigematsu.

At the 2009 Japan Junior Championships, she placed 10th. Debuting on the ISU Junior Grand Prix series in autumn 2010, she won her debut at the Grand Prix in Japan despite falling in both her short program and free skate. At her second assignment, she won silver. At the JGP Final, she finished in fourth.

She finished fifth in her senior national debut at the Japan Championships after having won the Japan Junior Championships. In March, at the World Junior Championships, she was 7th in the short program and rose to 5th overall after the free skate.

In the 2011–12 JGP season, Shoji took silver at both of her assignments, Australia and Estonia. She finished sixth at her second JGP Final after missing jumps in her free skate. She won the bronze medal at the Japan Junior Championships and was unsatisfied with her performance there. At the senior championships, she placed 7th.

Shoji at the 2012 World Junior Championships

In the latter half of the season, she finished sixth at the 2012 Winter Youth Olympics, then 20th at the 2012 World Junior Championships.

Shoji spent her second year of high school living in Colorado in the United States, where she focused on skating. However, she began to struggle with injuries, including a stress fracture in a toe. Her doctor advised her rest, but she did not do so. At the 2012 Japan Championships, she struggled to rotate her jumps and finished in 12th place. In March, she won the bronze medal at the Coupe du Printemps.

In the 2013–2014 season, she placed 8th at the 2013 Finlandia Trophy, and she qualified for the 2013–14 Japan Championships, where she finished in 23rd place. These were her last major competitions. She continued competing domestically through the 2018–2019 season, then retired on graduating from university.

== Post-competitive career ==
Shoji attended Keio University, studying in the School of Policy Management. She acted in a drama in 2019 and has made appearances on news programs as well as in ice shows.

== Programs ==
Season	Short program	Free skating	Exhibition
2013–2014	Dark Eyes choreo. by Kenji Miyamoto	Violin Concerto in D major; Love Theme from Juarez by Erich Wolfgang Korngold choreo. by Tom Dickson	
2012–2013	Winter from Four Seasons by Antonio Vivaldi choreo. by Kenji Miyamoto	The Notebook by Aaron Zigman choreo. by David Wilson	Like A Drug by Kylie Minogue
2011–2012	Hacha Cha Cha by Brian Bromberg; Swingin' for the Fences by Gordon Goodwin's Big Phat Band; Apple Honey by Woody Herman choreo. by Kenji Miyamoto	Legends of the Fall by James Horner choreo. by Naoki Shigematsu	When Will My Life Begin? (from Tangled) performed by Mandy Moore
2010–2011	Libertango by Astor Piazzolla choreo. by Kenji Miyamoto	The Lake House; The Cider House Rules by Rachel Portman choreo. by Naoki Shigematsu	5,6,7,8 by Steps

== Competitive highlights ==
International
Event	08–09	09–10	10–11	11–12	12–13	13–14
Finlandia Trophy						8th
Printemps					3rd	
International: Junior
Junior Worlds			5th	20th		
Youth Olympics				6th		
JGP Final			4th	6th		
JGP Australia				2nd		
JGP Austria					12th	
JGP Czech Rep.			2nd			
JGP Estonia				2nd		
JGP Japan			1st			
National
Japan			5th	7th	12th	23rd
Japan Junior	29th	10th	1st	3rd		

== Detailed results ==
2013–2014 season
Date	Event	Level	QR	SP	FS	Total
October 4–6, 2013	2013 Finlandia Trophy	Senior	–	8; 44.71	8; 80.19	8; 124.90
2012–2013 season
Date	Event	Level	QR	SP	FS	Total
March 22–24, 2013	2013 Coupe du Printemps	Senior	–	3; 47.22	3; 82.44	3; 129.66
December 20–24, 2012	2012 Japanese Championships	Senior	–	14; 50.45	12; 92.74	12; 143.19
September 13–15, 2012	2012 Junior Grand Prix, Austria	Junior	–	11; 42.29	12; 77.29	12; 119.58
2011–2012 season
Date	Event	Level	QR	SP	FS	Total
Feb. 27 - March 4, 2012	2012 World Junior Championships	Junior	–	18; 43.13	22; 69.95	20; 113.08
January 14–22, 2012	2012 Youth Olympics	Junior	–	6; 47.29	5; 88.03	6; 135.32
December 22–25, 2011	2011 Japanese Championships	Senior	–	11; 51.50	7; 104.97	7; 156.47
December 8–11, 2011	2011–12 ISU Junior Grand Prix Final	Junior	–	4; 51.53	6; 82.82	6; 134.35
November 25–27, 2011	2011 Japanese Junior Championships	Junior	–	7; 49.30	2; 102.39	3; 151.69
October 13–15, 2011	2011 Junior Grand Prix, Estonia	Junior	–	2; 55.19	2; 102.64	2; 157.83
September 8–10, 2011	2011 Junior Grand Prix, Australia	Junior	–	4; 47.28	2; 100.21	2; 147.29
2010–2011 season
Date	Event	Level	QR	SP	FS	Total
Feb. 27 – March 6, 2011	2011 World Junior Championships	Junior	2; 89.24	7; 51.49	5; 99.78	5; 151.27
December 24–27, 2010	2010 Japanese Championships	Senior	–	4; 58.22	5; 107.60	5; 165.82
November 26–28, 2010	2010 Japanese Junior Championships	Junior	-	1; 56.56	1; 101.86	1; 158.42
December 8–12, 2010	2010–11 Junior Grand Prix Final	Junior	–	4; 52.56	5; 97.26	4; 149.82
October 11–16, 2010	2010 Junior Grand Prix, Czech Republic	Junior	–	4; 48.86	1; 106.37	2; 155.23
September 22–26, 2010	2010 Junior Grand Prix, Japan	Junior	–	1; 51.42	1; 97.97	1; 149.39

- QR = Qualifying round
