= Ira Vannut =

Belgian figure skater (born 1994)

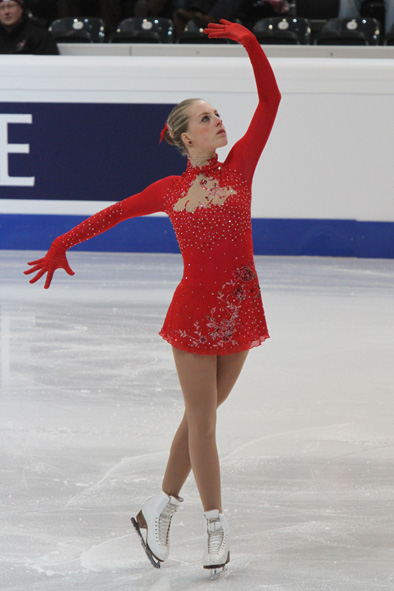
- Vannut in 2011

Personal information
- Born: 18 September 1994 (age 32) Sint-Truiden, Belgium
- Home town: Alken
- Height: 1.69 m (5 ft 6 1/2 in)

Figure skating career
- Country: Belgium
- Coach: Silvie de Rijcke
- Skating club: HSK Hasselt
- Began skating: 1999

Ira Vannut (born 18 September 1994) is a Belgian former competitive figure skater. She is the 2011 Belgian ladies champion and the first female skater from Belgium to medal on the ISU Junior Grand Prix series, winning a bronze at the 2010 Pokal der Blauen Schwerter.

== Career ==
Vannut began skating by the age of four or five, after attending a public session with her mother. Later, her grandmother signed her up for a club where she began to take skating lessons.

In the 2009–10 season, Vannut competed exclusively on the junior circuit, finishing 11th and 12th at her two Junior Grand Prix assignments and 22nd at the 2010 World Junior Championships.

In 2010–11, Vannut again competed on the Junior Grand Prix series. She finished fourth in her first event and then won the bronze medal at the 2010 Pokal der Blauen Schwerter in Dresden, Germany. After winning her first senior national title, she was named in the Belgian team for the 2011 European Championships. At Europeans, she won the qualifying round, and was ranked seventh overall. Vannut then placed in the top ten at the 2011 World Junior Championships. Concluding her season, she qualified for the free skate at the 2011 World Championships and finished 19th overall.

== Personal life ==
Vannut graduated from high school in 2012. She played tennis and practiced ballet until age 14 when she decided to focus on her skating career.

== Programs ==
Season	Short program	Free skating
2010–2011	Eine Frau in Berlin by Zbigniew Preisner	Children of Dune
2009–2010	Music by Rondo Veneziano	Music by Bond

== Competitive highlights ==
Results
International
Event	2008–09	2009–10	2010–11
World Champ.			19th
European Champ.			7th
Cup of Nice		3rd J.	4th
International: Junior
World Junior Champ.		22nd	10th
JGP Austria			4th
JGP Germany			3rd
JGP Poland		11th	
JGP Turkey		12th	
EYOF			2nd J.
National
Belgian Champ.	1st J.	1st J.	1st
JGP = Junior Grand Prix; J. = Junior
