= Dean Copely =

American ice dancer

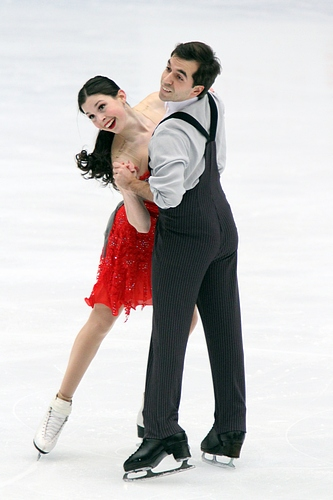
- Lichtman & Copely at the 2010–2011 JGP Final

Personal information
- Born: August 28, 1989 (age 36) Fort Myers, Florida

Figure skating career
- Country: United States
- Coach: Igor Shpilband; Marina Zueva
- Skating club: All Year FCS
- Began skating: 1993

Dean J. Copely Jr. (born August 28, 1989) is an American former competitive ice dancer. With Charlotte Lichtman, he was the 2011 World Junior Ice Dance bronze medalist and 2011 U.S. Junior Ice Dance champion.

== Career ==
Dean Copely began skating in 1993. He began as a singles skater and competed at the intermediate level coached by Priscilla Hill for six years. He began training in ice dance at the age of 12 at which time he partnered with Rachel Siegel and competed with her on the juvenile level. He later partnered and competed with Ashley Foy in ice dance. Dean also competed for a season in juvenile pair skating with Meredith Pipkin. Dean qualified for the U.S. Junior Figure Skating Championships in all three disciplines.

Copely competed at both the Novice and Junior levels with Anastasia Cannuscio until April 2008 when he relocated to Canton, Michigan, to train with Igor Shpilband and Marina Zueva known for coaching many North American and European teams to national and Olympic podiums. There he teamed up with Charlotte Lichtman following the 2008 Lake Placid Ice Dancing Championships. They began competing on the ISU Junior Grand Prix series during the 2009–10 season.

Lichtman and Copely won gold and bronze medals competing in the 2010–2011 ISU Junior Grand Prix series, and qualified for the JGP Final in Beijing, China, where they finished fifth. Together they won the gold in Junior Ice dance at the U.S. Figure Skating Championships in Greensboro, North Carolina, after which they were featured in the Smucker's Skating Spectacular exhibition show and the RISE Tribute performance (choreographed by Randy Gardner and later included in the USFSA's skating documentary RISE). They went on to win the bronze medal at the World Junior Figure Skating Championships in Gangneung, South Korea.

Lichtman and Copely announced the amicable end of their partnership on April 27, 2012. Dean is a graduate of Western Michigan University. He currently coaches at a number of rinks throughout Michigan.

== Personal life ==
His sister is the former Lithuanian National Ice Dance Champion Katherine Copely.

== Programs ==
(with Lichtman)

Season	Short dance	Free dance
2011–2012	Mambo No. 5 by Lou Bega; Perhaps, Perhaps, Perhaps by Doris Day	Austin Powers
2010–2011	That's Amore; An Evening in Rome by Dean Martin	Beetlejuice: The Book; Travel Music; Obituaries; Main Title by Danny Elfman
	Original dance	
2009–2010	Georgian folk: Lezginka; Suliko	Limelight by Charlie Chaplin
2008–2009	Crazy for You by George Gershwin: I've Got Rhythm; Embraceable You	The Mask of Zorro by James Horner

== Competitive highlights ==
=== Ice dance ===
(with Lichtman)

Results
Event	2008–09	2009–10	2010–11	2011–12
GP Cup of China				7th
Junior Worlds			3rd	
JGP Final			5th	
JGP Austria			1st	
JGP Croatia		4th		
JGP Germany			3rd	
JGP Hungary		8th		
U.S. Championships	9th J.	8th J.	1st J.	10th
