= Anna Silaeva =

Russian former competitive pair skater (born 1992)

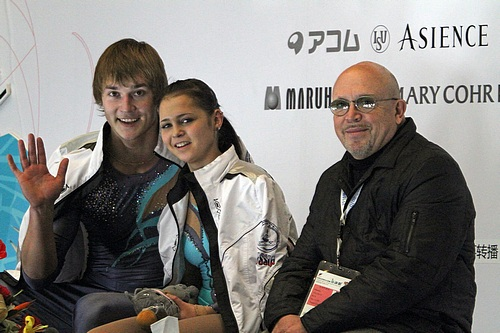
- Silaeva with Minchuk and Velikov in 2010

Personal information
- Native name: Анна Сергеевна Силаева
- Full name: Anna Sergeyevna Silaeva
- Born: 25 May 1992 (age 34) Moscow, Russia
- Height: 1.53 m (5 ft 0 in)

Figure skating career
- Country: Russia
- Skating club: SDUSHOR St. Petersburg
- Began skating: 1996

Anna Sergeyevna Silaeva (Russian: Анна Сергеевна Силаева; born 25 May 1992) is a Russian former competitive pair skater. She competed with Artur Minchuk from 2008 to 2011. The pair was named in Russia's team to the 2010 World Junior Championships in The Hague, Netherlands; they finished 11th after placing 9th in the short program and 14th in the free skate. The following season, they qualified for the 2010–11 Junior Grand Prix Final in Beijing, where they finished 8th.

== Programs ==
(with Minchuk)

Season	Short program	Free skating
2010–11	Khorobushko performed by Bond	Rhapsody on a Theme of Paganini by Sergei Rachmaninoff
2009–10	Flamenco by Didulia	Rhapsody on a Theme of Paganini by Sergei Rachmaninoff

== Competitive highlights ==
JGP: Junior Grand Prix

=== With Minchuk ===
International
Event	2009–10	2010–11
World Junior Champ.	11th	
JGP Final		8th
JGP Czech Republic		4th
JGP Germany		3rd
National
Russian Junior Champ.	3rd	5th

=== Ladies' singles ===
National
Event	2006–07	2007–08
Russian Junior Champ.	14th	13th
