= Artur Minchuk =

Russian pair skater and coach

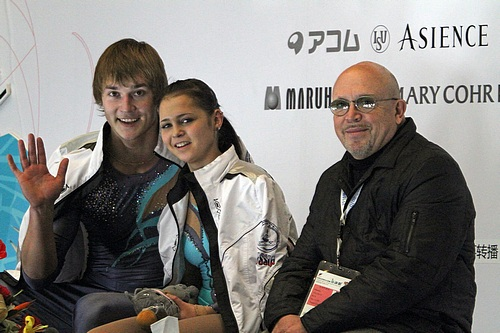
- Minchuk with Silaeva in 2010

Personal information
- Native name: Артур Леонидович Минчук
- Full name: Artur Leonidovich Minchuk
- Born: 7 July 1989 (age 37) Kiev, Ukrainian SSR, Soviet Union
- Height: 1.80 m (5 ft 11 in)

Figure skating career
- Country: Russia
- Skating club: SDUSHOR St. Petersburg
- Began skating: 1993

Artur Leonidovich Minchuk (Russian: Артур Леонидович Минчук; born 7 July 1989) is a Russian pair skating coach and former competitor.

== Career ==
=== Competitive ===
Minchuk's partnership with Ksenia Stolbova lasted three seasons, from 2006–07 to 2008–09. They finished 11th competing on the senior level at the Russian Championships in December 2008.

Minchuk teamed up with Anna Silaeva in 2009. They took the bronze medal at the 2010 Russian Junior Championships and were named in Russia's team to the 2010 World Junior Championships in The Hague, Netherlands. The pair finished 11th after placing 9th in the short program and 14th in the free skate. The following season, they qualified for the 2010–11 Junior Grand Prix Final in Beijing, where they finished 8th.

=== Post-competitive ===
Minchuk joined the Russian Ice Stars in 2011. He works as a skating coach in Saint Petersburg, Russia. His students include:

- Aleksandra Boikova / Dmitrii Kozlovskii (from 2015), 2021 World bronze medalists, 2020 European champions
- Anastasia Mishina / Aleksandr Galliamov (from 2020), 2021 World champions

== Programs ==
(with Silaeva)

Season	Short program	Free skating
2010–11	Khorobushko performed by Bond	Rhapsody on a Theme of Paganini by Sergei Rachmaninoff
2009–10	Flamenco by Didulia	Rhapsody on a Theme of Paganini by Sergei Rachmaninoff

== Competitive highlights ==
JGP: Junior Grand Prix

=== With Silaeva ===
International
Event	2009–10	2010–11
World Junior Champ.	11th	
JGP Final		8th
JGP Czech Republic		4th
JGP Germany		3rd
National
Russian Junior Champ.	3rd	5th

=== With Stolbova ===
National
Event	2006–07	2007–08	2008–09
Russian Championships			11th
Russian Junior Champ.	12th	10th	
