= 2010 World Junior Figure Skating Championships =

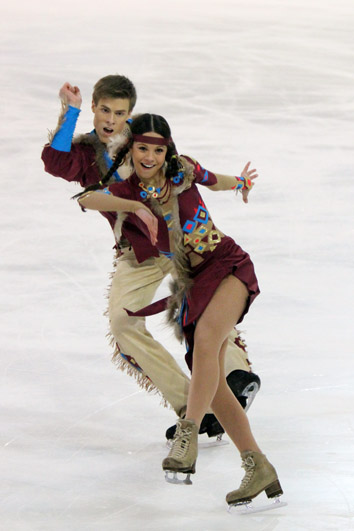
- Elena Ilinykh and Nikita Katsalapov JWC 2010 OD.
- Type: ISU Championship
- Date: March 9 – 13
- Season: 2009–10
- Location: The Hague, Netherlands
- Host: Dutch Skating Federation
- Venue: The Uithof

Champions
- Men's singles: (Japan) Yuzuru Hanyu
- Ladies' singles: (Japan) Kanako Murakami
- Pairs: (China) Sui Wenjing / Han Cong
- Ice dance: (Russia) Elena Ilinykh / Nikita Katsalapov
- Previous: 2009 World Junior Championships
- Next: 2011 World Junior Championships

The 2010 World Junior Figure Skating Championships was an international competition in the 2009–10 season. Commonly called "World Juniors" and "Junior Worlds", the annual event awards medals in the disciplines men's singles, ladies' singles, pair skating, and ice dancing.

The event was held between March 8 and 14, 2010 at The Uithof in The Hague, Netherlands.

== Qualification ==
The competition was open to skaters representing ISU member nations who were at least 13 but not 19—or 21 for male pair skaters and ice dancers—before July 1, 2009 in their place of birth. National associations selected their entries according to their own criteria.

The term "Junior" in ISU competition refers to age, not skill level. Skaters may remain age-eligible for Junior Worlds even after competing nationally and internationally at the senior level. At junior events, the ISU requires that all programs conform to junior-specific rules regarding program length, jumping passes, types of elements, etc.

=== Number of entries per discipline ===
Based on the results of the 2009 World Junior Championships, the ISU allowed each country one to three entries per discipline. Countries which qualified more than one entry in a discipline:

Spots	Men	Ladies	Pairs	Dance
3	China; United States	Russia; United States	Canada; Russia; United States	Canada; Russia; United States
2	Canada; Czech Republic; Kazakhstan; Russia	Georgia; Germany; Slovakia; Sweden	China; Japan; Switzerland	Czech Republic; France; Italy

If not listed above, one entry was allowed.

== Medals table ==
Rank	Nation	Gold	Silver	Bronze	Total
1	Japan (JPN)	2	1	0	3
2	China (CHN)	1	1	0	2
3	Russia (RUS)	1	0	4	5
4	Canada (CAN)	0	1	0	1
4	United States (USA)	0	1	0	1
Totals (5 entries)		4	4	4	12

== Results ==
=== Men ===
Rank	Name	Nation	Total points	SP		FS	
1	Yuzuru Hanyu	Japan	216.10	3	68.75	1	147.35
2	Song Nan	China	205.25	5	67.97	2	137.28
3	Artur Gachinski	Russia	199.19	6	65.20	3	133.99
4	Keegan Messing	United States	197.03	2	68.90	4	128.13
5	Grant Hochstein	United States	194.30	1	71.35	7	122.95
6	Andrei Rogozine	Canada	179.81	13	56.07	6	123.74
7	Artur Dmitriev	Russia	177.78	15	53.90	5	123.88
8	Alexander Majorov	Sweden	177.01	7	64.15	8	112.86
9	Denis Ten	Kazakhstan	171.86	4	68.40	15	103.46
10	Armin Mahbanoozadeh	United States	168.69	8	62.30	12	106.39
11	Abzal Rakimgaliev	Kazakhstan	167.88	10	58.40	11	109.48
12	Javier Raya	Spain	164.41	9	60.45	14	103.96
13	Morgan Cipres	France	162.01	16	52.20	10	109.81
14	Liu Jiaxing	China	161.50	17	50.95	9	110.55
15	Jorik Hendrickx	Belgium	159.67	14	54.20	13	105.47
16	Daniel Dotzauer	Germany	154.83	11	57.00	17	97.83
17	Zang Wenbo	China	148.99	20	49.60	16	99.39
18	Sebastian Iwasaki	Poland	142.39	21	49.60	18	92.79
19	Kevin Alves	Brazil	141.44	18	50.38	19	91.06
20	Ronald Lam	Canada	141.31	12	56.57	22	84.74
21	Petr Coufal	Czech Republic	138.11	23	47.60	20	90.51
22	Stephen Li-Chung Kuo	Chinese Taipei	136.27	19	50.04	21	86.23
23	Petr Bidař	Czech Republic	131.30	24	47.50	23	83.80
24	Bela Papp	Finland	128.78	22	49.17	24	79.61
Did not advance to free skating
25	Kim Min-seok	South Korea		25	47.38		
26	Viktor Romanenkov	Estonia		26	47.25		
27	Saverio Giacomelli	Italy		27	46.37		
28	Mario-Rafael Ionian	Austria		28	46.23		
29	Stanislav Pertsov	Ukraine		29	46.10		
30	Stephane Walker	Switzerland		30	43.25		
31	Jakub Strobl	Slovakia		31	43.10		
32	Saulius Ambrulevičius	Lithuania		32	42.10		
33	Matthew Precious	Australia		33	39.25		
34	Slavik Hayrapetyan	Armenia		34	38.50		
35	Mikhail Karaliuk	Belarus		35	37.15		
36	Zsolt Kosz	Romania		36	35.28		
37	Kristóf Forgó	Hungary		37	34.96		
38	Girts Jekabsons	Latvia		38	33.24		
39	Harry Mattick	United Kingdom		39	31.67		
40	Manol Atanassov	Bulgaria		40	31.27		
41	Vivian John Parnell-Murphy	Ireland		41	30.57		
42	Berk Akalin	Turkey		42	29.56		
43	Hau Yin Lee	Hong Kong		43	29.13		
44	Ivor Mikolcevic	Croatia		44	29.09		
45	Boyito Mulder	Netherlands		45	27.92		
46	Amel Burekovic	Bosnia and Herzegovina		46	14.36		

=== Ladies ===
Rank	Name	Nation	Total points	SP		FS	
1	Kanako Murakami	Japan	165.47	2	59.00	1	106.47
2	Agnes Zawadzki	United States	156.79	8	50.98	2	105.81
3	Polina Agafonova	Russia	154.27	3	56.28	4	97.99
4	Polina Shelepen	Russia	151.65	7	51.42	3	100.23
5	Anna Ovcharova	Russia	147.52	1	59.80	8	87.72
6	Kate Charbonneau	Canada	147.46	4	53.80	7	93.66
7	Kiri Baga	United States	146.98	5	52.28	5	94.70
8	Christina Gao	United States	143.86	9	49.34	6	94.52
9	Joshi Helgesson	Sweden	138.13	6	52.10	9	86.03
10	Julia Pfrengle	Germany	133.05	11	47.84	10	85.21
11	Léna Marrocco	France	127.62	10	49.10	12	78.52
12	Svetlana Issakova	Estonia	124.10	17	44.48	11	79.62
13	Romy Bühler	Switzerland	121.94	15	45.24	13	76.70
14	Sıla Saygı	Turkey	118.28	13	45.92	15	72.36
15	Beata Papp	Finland	117.32	20	43.66	14	73.66
16	Karina Johnson	Denmark	115.17	18	43.94	16	71.23
17	Angelica Olsson	Sweden	114.44	12	46.76	19	67.68
18	Isabel Drescher	Germany	111.95	21	43.12	17	68.83
19	Zhu Qiuying	China	110.55	24	42.48	18	68.07
20	Francesca Rio	Italy	107.12	16	44.64	20	62.48
21	Alina Milevska	Ukraine	105.02	14	45.36	22	59.66
22	Ira Vannut	Belgium	103.68	23	43.00	21	60.68
23	Manouk Gijsman	Netherlands	103.14	19	43.70	23	59.44
24	Alina Fjodorova	Latvia	102.18	22	43.04	24	59.14
Did not advance to free skating
25	Kristina Kostková	Czech Republic		25	41.88		
26	Anne Line Gjersem	Norway		26	41.48		
27	Nika Cerič	Slovenia		27	39.92		
28	Georgia Glastris	Greece		28	39.62		
29	Mimi Tanasorn Chindasook	Thailand		29	39.04		
30	Karolína Sýkorová	Slovakia		30	38.70		
31	Alexandra Kunová	Slovakia		31	38.62		
32	Daniela Stoeva	Bulgaria		32	38.60		
33	Melinda Wang	Chinese Taipei		33	37.94		
34	Rimgailė Meškaitė	Lithuania		34	37.86		
35	Ariana Tarrado Ribes	Andorra		35	36.60		
36	Zhaira Costiniano	Philippines		36	36.56		
37	Kim Hae-lin	South Korea		37	36.26		
38	Charlotte Robbins	United Kingdom		38	33.56		
39	Sabina Paquier	Romania		39	32.56		
40	Sofia Bardakov	Israel		40	31.72		
41	Isadora Williams	Brazil		41	31.12		
42	Victoria Hübler	Austria		42	30.90		
43	Kristina Prilepko	Kazakhstan		43	30.68		
44	Mila Petrovic	Serbia		44	29.30		
45	Fanni Forgó	Hungary		45	29.16		
46	Brittany Lau	Singapore		46	28.92		
47	Jaimee Nobbs	Australia		47	28.12		
48	Celia Robledo	Spain		48	26.90		
49	Nadia Geldenhuys	South Africa		49	25.98		
50	Tze Ching Lee	Hong Kong		50	24.88		
51	Franka Vugec	Croatia		51	24.82		
52	Ani Lominadze	Georgia		52	21.84		
53	Priscila Alavez	Mexico		53	21.34		
54	Nino Abashidze	Georgia		54	18.98		
55	Naida Akšamija	Bosnia and Herzegovina		55	16.26		

=== Pairs ===
- China did not qualify for a third spot in pairs but one was accepted wrongly and therefore the third team was disqualified.

Rank	Name	Nation	Total points	SP		FS	
1	Sui Wenjing / Han Cong	China	170.71	1	60.94	1	109.77
2	Narumi Takahashi / Mervin Tran	Japan	157.23	2	59.54	2	97.69
3	Ksenia Stolbova / Fedor Klimov	Russia	145.35	3	54.26	3	91.09
4	Tatiana Novik / Mikhail Kuznetsov	Russia	139.63	5	49.38	5	90.25
5	Britney Simpson / Nathan Miller	United States	138.00	4	52.50	6	85.50
6	Zhang Yue / Wang Lei	China	135.86	11	44.90	4	90.96
7	Brittany Jones / Kurtis Gaskell	Canada	133.41	7	48.12	7	85.29
~~8~~	~~Yu Xiaoyu / Jin Yang~~	~~China~~	~~129.48~~	~~8~~	~~47.90~~	~~9~~	~~81.58~~
8	Margaret Purdy / Michael Marinaro	Canada	129.29	10	45.24	8	84.05
9	Felicia Zhang / Taylor Toth	United States	128.01	6	48.50	9	79.51
10	Kaleigh Hole / Adam Johnson	Canada	119.68	8	47.04	12	72.64
11	Anna Silaeva / Artur Minchuk	Russia	117.96	9	46.62	14	71.34
12	Juliana Gurdhzi / Alexander Voeller	Germany	116.72	15	39.52	10	77.20
13	Brynn Carman / AJ Reiss	United States	115.90	12	44.48	13	71.42
14	Klára Kadlecová / Petr Bidař	Czech Republic	115.07	13	42.18	11	72.89
15	Anna Khnychenkova / Márk Magyar	Hungary	96.00	14	40.40	15	55.60
Did not advance to free skating
16	Natalja Zabijako / Sergei Muhhin	Estonia		16	35.90		
17	Anastasia Levshina / Jakub Tyc	Poland		17	35.80		
18	Rie Aoi / Wen Xiong Guo	Hong Kong		18	32.42		
19	Catherine Clement / James Hunt	United Kingdom		19	31.80		
20	Stina Martini / Severin Kiefer	Austria		20	31.54		

=== Ice dancing ===
Rank	Name	Nation	Total points	CD		OD		FD	
1	Elena Ilinykh / Nikita Katsalapov	Russia	188.28	1	37.52	1	59.94	1	90.82
2	Alexandra Paul / Mitchell Islam	Canada	172.37	5	33.32	2	55.90	2	83.15
3	Ksenia Monko / Kirill Khaliavin	Russia	168.81	4	34.17	3	53.55	5	81.09
4	Maia Shibutani / Alex Shibutani	United States	168.35	2	34.27	4	52.67	4	81.41
5	Lorenza Alessandrini / Simone Vaturi	Italy	167.84	6	32.35	5	52.62	3	82.87
6	Ekaterina Pushkash / Jonathan Guerreiro	Russia	162.16	3	34.20	6	48.60	6	79.36
7	Rachel Tibbetts / Colin Brubaker	United States	153.50	7	31.89	7	48.17	7	73.44
8	Anastasia Galyeta / Alexei Shumski	Ukraine	146.96	8	29.14	8	46.30	8	71.52
9	Piper Gilles / Zachary Donohue	United States	141.30	11	27.83	9	45.78	12	67.69
10	Geraldine Bott / Neil Brown	France	140.65	12	27.78	10	43.45	10	69.42
11	Stefanie Frohberg / Tim Giesen	Germany	139.51	9	28.56	15	41.76	11	69.19
12	Dóra Turóczi / Balázs Major	Hungary	139.29	16	27.20	12	42.46	9	69.63
13	Olivia Nicole Martins / Alvin Chau	Canada	135.63	13	27.68	14	41.96	13	65.99
14	Gabriela Kubova / Dmitri Kiselev	Czech Republic	133.48	15	27.38	13	42.13	14	63.97
15	Charlotte Aiken / Josh Whidborne	United Kingdom	132.24	10	28.29	11	42.51	17	61.44
16	Sara Hurtado / Adria Diaz	Spain	128.44	17	27.04	21	39.27	15	62.13
17	Katelyn Good / Nikolaj Sorensen	Denmark	128.41	20	25.29	16	41.48	16	61.64
18	Oksana Klimova / Sasha Palomäki	Finland	127.82	14	27.67	22	39.07	18	61.08
19	Nikola Višňová / Lukáš Csolley	Slovakia	126.23	21	25.26	17	41.20	19	59.77
20	Justyna Plutowska / Dawid Pietrzyński	Poland	109.40	18	25.76	18	40.52	20	43.12
Did not advance to free dance
21	Sonja Pauli / Tobias Eisenbauer	Austria	64.39	24	24.48	19	39.91		
22	Gabriella Papadakis / Guillaume Cizeron	France	63.28	28	23.61	20	39.67		
23	Abby Carswell / Andrew Doleman	Canada	63.16	23	24.56	23	38.60		
24	Maria Popkova / Viktor Kovalenko	Uzbekistan	62.79	19	25.74	25	37.05		
25	Yiyi Zhang / Nan Wu	China	61.91	26	24.03	24	37.88		
26	Karolína Procházková / Michal Češka	Czech Republic	61.15	25	24.22	26	36.93		
27	Ramona Elsener / Florian Roost	Switzerland	60.68	27	23.79	27	36.89		
28	Irina Shtork / Taavi Rand	Estonia	60.18	22	25.24	28	34.94		
29	Lesia Valadzenkava / Vitali Vakunov	Belarus	52.89	29	22.22	29	30.67		
WD	Ioana Harmony Risca / Chase Andrews Brogan	Romania		30	22.17				
Did not advance to original dance
31	Sofia Sforza / Francesco Fioretti	Italy		31	22.00				
32	Kristina Tremasova / Dimitar Lichev	Bulgaria		32	21.28				
33	Ksenia Pecherkina / Aleksander Jakushin	Latvia		33	20.72				
34	Ayesha Yigit / Shane Speden	New Zealand		34	17.74				
