= Robert Schultz (figure skater) =

Canadian pair skater

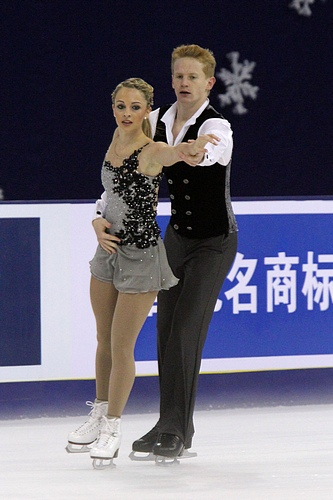

Personal information
- Born: July 20, 1989 (age 37) Hamilton, Ontario
- Home town: Puslinch, Ontario
- Height: 1.78 m (5 ft 10 in)

Figure skating career
- Country: Canada
- Partner: Shalena Rau
- Coach: Kevin Wheeler
- Skating club: Preston FSC
- Began skating: 1993

Robert Schultz (born July 20, 1989, in Hamilton, Ontario) is a Canadian pair skater. He formerly competed with partner Taylor Steele.

== Programs ==
(with Steele)

Season	Short program	Free skating
2011–2012	House of the Rising Sun	Piano Concerto in F by George Gershwin: Andante con moto, Adagio; III. Allegretto Agitato
2010–2011	Malèna by Ennio Morricone	Nocturne by Paul Schwartz; Bohemian Rhapsody by Freddie Mercury
2009–2010	Malèna by Ennio Morricone	Street Music by William Russo

== Competitive highlights ==
(with Steele)

Results
International
Event	2009–2010	2010–2011	2011–2012
GP Cup of China			7th
JGP Final		4th	
JGP Czech Republic		6th	
JGP Germany	9th		
JGP Great Britain		4th	
JGP Poland	5th		
National
Canadians	4th J.	4th J.	5th
GP = Grand Prix; JGP = Junior Grand Prix; J. = Junior level
