= Oleksii Shumskyi =

Ukrainian ice dancer

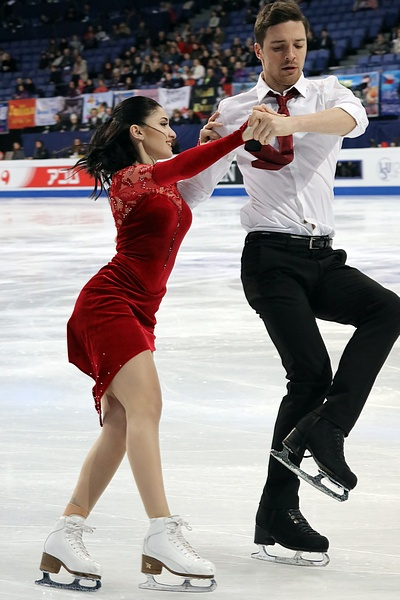
- Kozmava and Shumsky in 2017

Personal information
- Native name: Олексій Шумський
- Other names: Alexei Shumski
- Born: 3 October 1990 (age 36) Odessa, Ukrainian SSR
- Height: 1.79 m (5 ft 10 1/2 in)

Figure skating career
- Country: Georgia
- Partner: Tatiana Kozmava
- Coach: Igor Shpilband, Fabian Bourzat, Yuri Chesnichenko, Oleksandr Tumanovskyi
- Began skating: 1997

Oleksii (Alexei) Shumskyi (Ukrainian: Олексій Шумський; born 3 October 1990) is a competitive ice dancer. Competing for Ukraine with Anastasia Galyeta, he won four medals on the ISU Junior Grand Prix series and placed as high as 8th at the World Junior Championships. With Lolita Yermak, he is the 2014 International Cup of Nice bronze medalist. In 2015, he began competing for Georgia with Tatiana Kozmava.

== Career ==
=== Early career ===
Shumskyi debuted on the ISU Junior Grand Prix series in 2004 with Ksenia Ponomareva. In 2005, he teamed up with Anastasia Vykhodtseva. They competed in four seasons of the JGP series, winning two bronze medals, before parting ways in autumn 2008.

=== Partnership with Galyeta ===
Shumskyi teamed up with Anastasia Galyeta in November 2008. After becoming the Ukrainian junior silver medalists, they were assigned to the 2009 World Junior Championships, where they finished 23rd. They placed eighth the following year at the 2010 World Junior Championships. In their third season, Galyeta/Shumskyi won silver and bronze medals on the JGP series, qualified for the JGP Final, where they finished seventh, and placed 13th at the 2011 World Junior Championships. During their last season together, 2011–12, they won two silver medals on the JGP series and placed 5th at the JGP Final but were later disqualified due to Galyeta's positive doping sample.

In February 2012, it was reported that Galyeta and Shumskyi had parted ways.

=== Later partnerships ===
Shumskyi skated with Anastasia Kabanova in the 2012–13 season, placing fourth on the senior level at the Ukrainian Championships.

Shumskyi began competing with Lolita Yermak in the 2013–14 season, taking the bronze medal at the Ukrainian Championships in December 2013. In 2014–15, the two won bronze at the International Cup of Nice and silver at the Ukrainian Championships. Their last competition together was the 2015 Winter Universiade, where they placed 9th.

=== Switch to Georgia ===
Shumskyi began competing with Tatiana Kozmava for Georgia in the 2015–16 season.

== Programs ==
=== With Kozmava ===
Season	Short dance	Free dance
2016–2017	Blues: Minnie the Moocher; Swing: King of Swing performed by Big Bad Voodoo Daddy	The Master and Margarita by Igor Kornelyuk

=== With Yermak ===
Season	Short dance	Free dance	Exhibition
2014–2015	Sangre del Toro by Johannes Linstead; España cañí by Pascual Marquina Narro	Primavera Porteña by Astor Piazzolla	
2013–2014	Fever by Eddie Cooley, Otis Blackwell performed by Elvis Presley; Umbrella by Rihanna performed by The Baseballs	Primavera Porteña by Astor Piazzolla	Pulp Fiction: You Never Can Tell by Chuck Berry; Misirlou by Dick Dale

=== With Galyeta ===
Season	Short dance	Free dance
2011–2012	Cha cha: Sway; Salsa: Mujer Latina by Thalía	Tchaikovski Remix by Edvin Marton
2010–2011	Tango; Waltz	Blues; Quickstep
	Original dance	
2009–2010	Ukrainian folk: Hopak	Malaguena by Paul Mauriat
2008–2009	Ragtime: I Will Play Jazz by M. Mynkov	Elizabeth: The Golden Age by Craig Armstrong, A. R. Rahman

=== With Vykhodtseva ===
Season	Original dance	Free dance
2008–2009	Ragtime: I Will Play Jazz by M. Mynkov	Elizabeth: The Golden Age by Craig Armstrong, A. R. Rahman

== Competitive highlights ==
CS: Challenger Series; JGP: Junior Grand Prix

=== With Kozmava for Georgia ===
International
Event	2015–16	2016–17
World Champ.		32nd
European Championships		27th
Bavarian Open	10th	
Ice Star		7th
Santa Claus Cup		4th

=== With Yermak for Ukraine ===
International
Event	2013–14	2014–15
CS Ondrej Nepela Trophy		7th
Cup of Nice		3rd
Golden Spin of Zagreb	8th	
Ukrainian Open	8th	
Winter Universiade		9th
National
Ukrainian Championships	3rd	2nd

=== With Kabanova for Ukraine ===
National
Event	2012–13
Ukrainian Championships	4th

=== With Galyeta for Ukraine ===
International
Event	2008–09	2009–10	2010–11	2011–12
Junior Worlds	23rd	8th	13th	
JGP Final			7th	~~5th~~ DQ
JGP Czech Republic			3rd	
JGP Hungary		7th		
JGP Poland				2nd
JGP Romania			2nd	2nd
Pavel Roman Memorial		2nd J		
National
Ukrainian Champ.	2nd J	1st J		
J = Junior level; DQ = Disqualified

=== With Vykhodtseva for Ukraine ===
International
Event	2005–06	2006–07	2007–08	2008–09
JGP Austria			4th	
JGP Bulgaria			3rd	
JGP Canada	9th			
JGP Croatia	9th			
JGP France				7th
JGP Netherlands		8th		
JGP Spain				3rd
Grand Prize SNP			1st J	
National
Ukrainian Champ.	5th			
J = Junior level

=== With Ponomareva for Ukraine ===
International
Event	2004–05
JGP Romania	11th
JGP Ukraine	11th
