= 2009–10 ISU Junior Grand Prix =

Figure skating competition

- Type: ISU Junior Grand Prix
- Date: August 26 – December 6, 2009
- Season: 2009–10
- Location: (Hungary) Budapest (United States) Lake Placid, New York (Poland) Toruń (Belarus) Minsk (Germany) Dresden (Croatia) Zagreb (Turkey) Istanbul (Japan) Tokyo
- Previous: 2008–09 ISU Junior Grand Prix
- Next: 2010–11 ISU Junior Grand Prix

The 2009–10 ISU Junior Grand Prix was the 13th season of the ISU Junior Grand Prix, a series of international junior level competitions organized by the International Skating Union. It was the Junior-level complement to the 2009–10 ISU Grand Prix of Figure Skating, which is for Senior-level skaters. Skaters competed in the disciplines of men's singles, ladies' singles, pair skating, and ice dance.

Skaters earned points towards qualification at each of the seven Junior Grand Prix events. The top eight skaters/teams in the series from each discipline met at the Junior Grand Prix Final, which was held concurrently with the senior Grand Prix Final.

== Competitions ==
The locations of the JGP events change yearly. In the 2009–10 season, the series was composed of the following events:

Date	Event	Location	Other notes
August 26–30	2009 JGP Budapest	Budapest, Hungary	No pair competition
September 2–6	2009 JGP Lake Placid	Lake Placid, USA	
September 9–13	2009 JGP Torun Cup	Toruń, Poland	
September 23–27	2009 JGP Minsk Ice	Minsk, Belarus	
Sept. 30 – Oct. 4	2009 JGP Pokal der Blauen Schwerter	Dresden, Germany	
October 7–11	2009 Croatia Cup	Zagreb, Croatia	No pair competition
October 14–18	2009 JGP Bosphorus	Istanbul, Turkey	No pair competition
December 3–6	2009–10 Junior Grand Prix Final	Tokyo, Japan	

For the second time, the Junior Grand Prix Final was held in conjunction with the senior Grand Prix Final.

== Qualifying ==
Skaters who reached the age of 13 by July 1, 2009 but had not turned 19 (singles and females of the other two disciplines) or 21 (male pair skaters and ice dancers) were eligible to compete on the junior circuit. Unlike the senior ISU Grand Prix of Figure Skating, skaters for the Junior Grand Prix are entered by their national federations rather than seeded by the ISU. The number of entries allotted to each ISU member federation is determined by their skaters' placements at the previous season's World Junior Figure Skating Championships in each respective discipline.

For the 2009–2010 season, in singles, the three best placed member nations at the 2009 World Junior Figure Skating Championships were allowed to enter two skaters in all seven events. Member nations who placed fourth through sixth were allowed to enter one skater in all seven events. Member nations who placed seventh through twelfth were allowed to enter one skater in six of the seven events. Member nations with a skater who had qualified for the free skate at the World Junior Championships were allowed to enter one skater in five of the events. Member nations who did not qualify for the free skate but placed 25th through 30th in the short program were allowed to enter one skater in four of the events. Member nations who did not qualify for the free skate but placed 31st and lower were allowed to enter one skater in three of the events. Member nations who had not participated in the 2009 World Junior Championships were allowed to enter one skater in two events. There were provisions for additional entries per member country if another country did not use all of its allotted entries.

In pairs, member nations who placed in the top five at the 2009 World Junior Championships were allowed to enter three entries in all four events in which pairs will be contested. Member nations who qualified for the free skate at the World Junior Championships were allowed to enter two entries in all four events. All other member nations were allowed to enter one entry in all four events. The host nation was allowed to enter as many pair teams as it wanted.

In ice dance, the multiple spots allowance was the same as for singles.

The host country was allowed to enter up to three skaters/teams in singles and dance in their event, and there was no limit to the number of pairs teams.

The general spots allowance for the 2009-2010 Junior Grand Prix events was as follows:

Entries	Men	Ladies	Pairs	Ice dance
3 per event			Russia; United States; Canada; Japan; China	
2 per event	United States; Czech Republic; Russia	Russia; United States; Sweden	Switzerland; Estonia; Poland; France; Italy; Slovakia; Czech Republic; Netherlands; Hong Kong; Ukraine	United States; Russia; Canada
1 per event	Kazakhstan; China; Canada	Georgia; Germany; Slovakia		Czech Republic; Italy; France
1 in six events	Ukraine; Japan; Sweden; Germany; France; Slovakia	Italy; France; Canada; Austria; Estonia; Japan		Ukraine; China; Greece; Austria; Slovakia; United Kingdom
1 in five events	Spain; Italy; South Korea; Estonia; Australia	Chinese Taipei; China; Ukraine; Spain; South Korea; United Kingdom; Belarus		Hungary; Germany; Finland
1 in four events	Poland; Chinese Taipei; Belgium; United Kingdom; Finland; Turkey	Switzerland; Netherlands; Denmark; Thailand; New Zealand		Belarus; Poland; Switzerland; Estonia; Lithuania; Bulgaria
1 in three events	Armenia; Lithuania; Belarus; Austria; Switzerland; Romania; Bulgaria; Georgia; Netherlands; Croatia; New Zealand	Norway; Poland; Lithuania; Hungary; Greece; Finland; Australia; Latvia; Czech Republic; Mexico; Philippines; Israel; Bulgaria; Slovenia; Croatia; Andorra; Belgium; Armenia; Turkey; Serbia; Bosnia and Herzegovina; Singapore		Israel; Spain; Uzbekistan

All other member nations had one entry per discipline in two of the seven events in singles and ice dance and one entry in all four events in pairs.

== Junior Grand Prix Final qualifiers ==
The following skaters have qualified for the 2009–2010 Junior Grand Prix Final, in order of qualification.

	Men	Ladies	Pairs	Ice dance
1	(Japan) Yuzuru Hanyu	(Japan) Kanako Murakami	(China) Sui Wenjing / Han Cong	(United States) Maia Shibutani / Alex Shibutani
2	(United States) Ross Miner	(Russia) Polina Shelepen	(Japan) Narumi Takahashi / Mervin Tran	(Russia) Ksenia Monko / Kirill Khaliavin
3	(China) Song Nan	(United States) Kiri Baga	(Canada) Kaleigh Hole / Adam Johnson	(Russia) Elena Ilinykh / Nikita Katsalapov
4	(Russia) Artur Gachinski	(United States) Angela Maxwell	(China) Zhang Yue / Wang Lei	(Russia) Ekaterina Pushkash / Jonathan Guerreiro
5	(Japan) Kento Nakamura	(Russia) Ksenia Makarova	(Russia) Tatiana Novik / Mikhail Kuznetsov	(Canada) Kharis Ralph / Asher Hill
6	(Russia) Stanislav Kovalev	(United States) Christina Gao	(United States) Britney Simpson / Nathan Miller	(Italy) Lorenza Alessandrini / Simone Vaturi
7	(United States) Richard Dornbush	(Russia) Anna Ovcharova	(Russia) Alexandra Vasilieva / Yuri Shevchuk	(Russia) Marina Antipova / Artem Kudashev
8	(United States) Grant Hochstein	(United States) Ellie Kawamura	(Russia) Ksenia Stolbova / Fedor Klimov	(United States) Isabella Cannuscio / Ian Lorello
Alternates
1st	(United States) Austin Kanallakan	(Japan) Yuki Nishino	(Canada) Brittany Jones / Kurtis Gaskell	(Canada) Karen Routhier / Eric Saucke-Lacelle
2nd	(Russia) Gordei Gorshkov	(United States) Kristine Musademba	(Switzerland) Anaïs Morand / Antoine Dorsaz	(Ukraine) Alisa Agafonova / Dmitri Dun
3rd	(Russia) Zhan Bush	(Canada) Kate Charbonneau	(Canada) Maddison Bird / Raymond Schultz	(Russia) Tatiana Baturintseva / Ivan Volobuiev

== Medalists ==
=== Men ===
Competition	Gold	Silver	Bronze	Details
Hungary	(United States) Richard Dornbush	(United States) Grant Hochstein	(Russia) Zhan Bush	
United States	(United States) Ross Miner	(Japan) Kento Nakamura	(Russia) Mark Shakhmatov	
Poland	(Japan) Yuzuru Hanyu	(United States) Austin Kanallakan	(Russia) Gordei Gorshkov	
Belarus	(Russia) Artur Gachinski	(China) Song Nan	(Russia) Stanislav Kovalev	
Germany	(China) Song Nan	(Russia) Artur Gachinski	(Russia) Gordei Gorshkov	
Croatia	(Japan) Yuzuru Hanyu	(United States) Ross Miner	(Russia) Zhan Bush	
Turkey	(China) Yan Han	(Russia) Stanislav Kovalev	(Japan) Kento Nakamura	
Final	(Japan) Yuzuru Hanyu	(China) Song Nan	(United States) Ross Miner	

=== Ladies ===
Competition	Gold	Silver	Bronze	Details
Hungary	(Russia) Polina Shelepen	(United States) Angela Maxwell	(Japan) Haruka Imai	
United States	(United States) Kristine Musademba	(Russia) Ksenia Makarova	(Sweden) Isabelle M. Olsson	
Poland	(Japan) Kanako Murakami	(Russia) Anna Ovcharova	(United States) Christina Gao	
Belarus	(Russia) Polina Shelepen	(Japan) Yuki Nishino	(Russia) Ksenia Makarova	
Germany	(United States) Kiri Baga	(United States) Angela Maxwell	(Russia) Polina Agafonova	
Croatia	(Japan) Kanako Murakami	(Canada) Kate Charbonneau	(United States) Ellie Kawamura	
Turkey	(United States) Kiri Baga	(Russia) Sofia Biryukova	(United States) Christina Gao	
Final	(Japan) Kanako Murakami	(Russia) Polina Shelepen	(United States) Christina Gao	

=== Pairs ===
Competition	Gold	Silver	Bronze	Details
Hungary	No pairs competition held			
United States	(Canada) Kaleigh Hole / Adam Johnson	(Russia) Ksenia Stolbova / Fedor Klimov	(Japan) Narumi Takahashi / Mervin Tran	
Poland	(Japan) Narumi Takahashi / Mervin Tran	(Russia) Tatiana Novik / Mikhail Kuznetsov	(Canada) Brittany Jones / Kurtis Gaskell	
Belarus	(China) Sui Wenjing / Han Cong	(China) Zhang Yue / Wang Lei	(Canada) Kaleigh Hole / Adam Johnson	
Germany	(China) Sui Wenjing / Han Cong	(China) Zhang Yue / Wang Lei	(United States) Britney Simpson / Nathan Miller	
Croatia	No pairs competition held			
Turkey	No pairs competition held			
Final	(China) Sui Wenjing / Han Cong	(Japan) Narumi Takahashi / Mervin Tran	(China) Zhang Yue / Wang Lei	

=== Ice dance ===
Competition	Gold	Silver	Bronze	Details
Hungary	(Russia) Elena Ilinykh / Nikita Katsalapov	(Canada) Karen Routhier / Eric Saucke-Lacelle	(Italy) Lorenza Alessandrini / Simone Vaturi	
United States	(United States) Maia Shibutani / Alex Shibutani	(Canada) Kharis Ralph / Asher Hill	(United States) Lauri Bonacorsi / Travis Mager	
Poland	(Russia) Elena Ilinykh / Nikita Katsalapov	(Russia) Marina Antipova / Artem Kudashev	(United States) Isabella Cannuscio / Ian Lorello	
Belarus	(Russia) Ksenia Monko / Kirill Khaliavin	(United States) Rachel Tibbetts / Collin Brubaker	(Ukraine) Alisa Agafonova / Dmitri Dun	
Germany	(Russia) Ekaterina Pushkash / Jonathan Guerreiro	(Italy) Lorenza Alessandrini / Simone Vaturi	(United States) Piper Gilles / Zachary Donohue	
Croatia	(United States) Maia Shibutani / Alex Shibutani	(Canada) Kharis Ralph / Asher Hill	(Russia) Tatiana Baturintseva / Ivan Volobuiev	
Turkey	(Russia) Ksenia Monko / Kirill Khaliavin	(Russia) Ekaterina Pushkash / Jonathan Guerreiro	(United States) Isabella Cannuscio / Ian Lorello	
Final	(Russia) Ksenia Monko / Kirill Khaliavin	(Russia) Elena Ilinykh / Nikita Katsalapov	(United States) Maia Shibutani / Alex Shibutani	

== Medals table ==
The following is the table of total medals earned by each country on the 2009–2010 Junior Grand Prix. It can be sorted by country name, number of gold medals, number of silver medals, number of bronze medals, and total medals overall. The table is numbered by number of total medals.

Rank	Nation	Gold	Silver	Bronze	Total
1	Russia (RUS)	9	11	9	29
2	United States (USA)	7	6	11	24
3	Japan (JPN)	7	3	3	13
4	China (CHN)	5	4	1	10
5	Canada (CAN)	1	4	2	7
6	Italy (ITA)	0	1	1	2
7	Sweden (SWE)	0	0	1	1
7	Ukraine (UKR)	0	0	1	1
Totals (8 entries)		29	29	29	87
