= Nina Mozer =

Russian pair skating coach (born 1964)

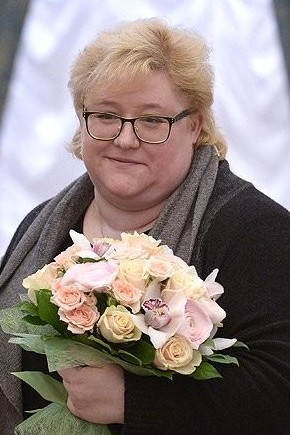
- Mozer in 2014

Personal information
- Native name: Нина Михайловна Мозер
- Full name: Nina Mikhailovna Mozer
- Born: 28 August 1964 (age 61) Kiev, Ukrainian SSR, Soviet Union

Figure skating career
- Skating club: Vorobiovy Gory (Moscow)

Nina Mikhailovna Mozer (Russian: Нина Михайловна Мозер; born 28 August 1964) is a Russian pair skating coach based in Moscow. She is best known for coaching Tatiana Volosozhar / Maxim Trankov and Ksenia Stolbova / Fedor Klimov, the 2014 Olympic gold and silver medalists.

== Personal life ==
Nina Mikhailovna Mozer was born 28 August 1964 in Kiev, the daughter of Mikhail Mozer, a tennis player, and Svetlana Mozer (Smirnova), the 1958 and 1959 Soviet ice dancing champion. She is the niece of football player Ivan Mozer. Her son, Nikita, was born in 1991.

== Career ==
Coached by her mother and Pyotr Orlov, Mozer competed in pair skating with S. Skorniakov but retired at 15 due to injury. She then began coaching, assisting her mother at Dynamo Kiev.

Mozer coached in Moscow from 1994 to 2001 and then for two years in the United States before returning to Moscow. She works at Vorobiovy Gory, Vdokhnovenie Ice Palace, collaborating with Stanislav Morozov and Vladislav Zhovnirski. She coaches the following skaters:

- Ekaterina Geynish / Dmitrii Chigirev
- Alina Pepeleva / Roman Pleshkov
- Polina Kostiukovich / Aleksei Briukhanov

Former pairs coached by Mozer include:

- Tatiana Volosozhar / Maxim Trankov (2014 Olympic champions, 2013 World champions). Mozer is their coach since May 2010.
- Ksenia Stolbova / Fedor Klimov (2014 Olympic silver medalists). Mozer began coaching them in April 2013.
- Evgenia Tarasova / Vladimir Morozov
- Natalia Zabiiako / Alexander Enbert
- Vera Bazarova / Yuri Larionov, from 26 March 2013 to 31 March 2014.
- Vasilisa Davankova / Alexander Enbert, from 30 April 2014.
- Tatiana Novik / Andrei Novoselov
- Tatiana Novik / Mikhail Kuznetsov
- Ekaterina Sheremetieva / Mikhail Kuznetsov
- Galina Maniachenko / Evgeni Zhigurski (1994 World Junior bronze medalists)
- Victoria Maxiuta / Vladislav Zhovnirski (1996 World Junior champions)
- Natalia Zabiiako / Yuri Larionov, from April 2014.
