= 2010 Russian Figure Skating Championships =

Figure skating competition

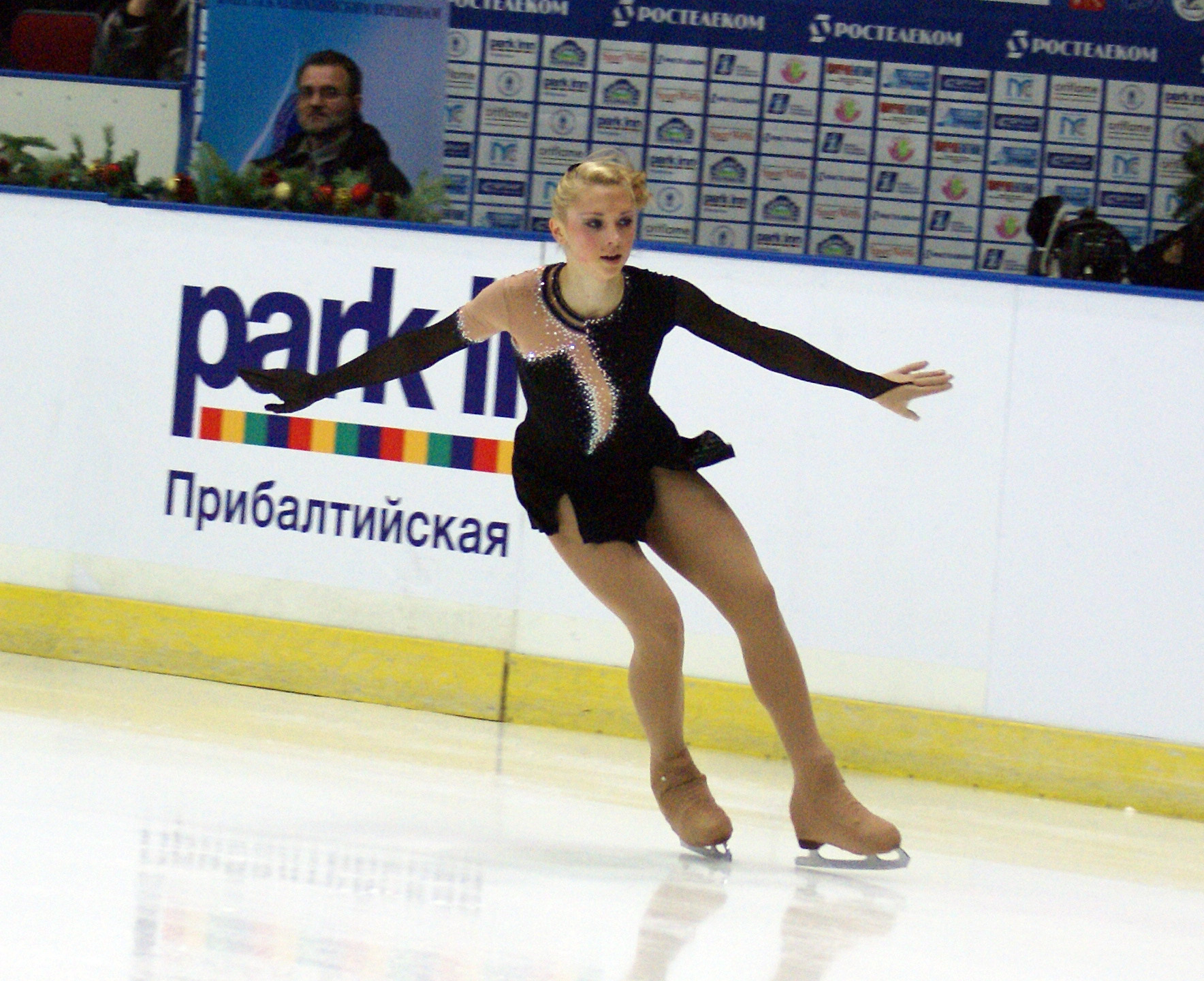
- Ksenia MAKAROVA Championship St Peterburg 2009-2010
- Type: National Championship
- Date: 23 – 27 December 2009
- Season: 2009–10
- Location: Saint Petersburg
- Host: Figure Skating Federation of Russia
- Venue: Yubileyny Sports Palace

Champions
- Men's singles: Evgeni Plushenko
- Ladies' singles: Ksenya Makarova
- Pairs: Yuko Kavaguti / Aleksander Smirnov
- Ice dance: Oksana Domnina / Maxim Shabalin
- Previous: 2009 Russian Championships
- Next: 2011 Russian Championships

The 2010 Russian Figure Skating Championships (Russian: Чемпионат России по фигурному катанию на коньках 2010) was held from 23 to 27 December 2009 at the Yubileyny Sports Palace in Saint Petersburg. Medals were awarded in men's singles, women's singles, pair skating, and ice dance at the senior and junior levels.

== Competitions ==
Date	Event	Type	Location
23–27 December 2009	2010 Russian Championships	Final	Saint Petersburg
3–6 February 2010	2010 Russian Junior Championships	Final	Saransk, Mordovia
3–6 March 2010	2010 Russian Cup Final	Final	Tver, Tver Oblast
17–21 March 2010	2010 Russian Youth Championships – Younger Age	Final	Kazan, Republic of Tatarstan
31 March – 3 April 2010	2010 Russian Youth Championships – Elder Age	Final	Stary Oskol, Belgorod Oblast

== Medalists of most important competitions ==
Senior Championships
Discipline	Gold	Silver	Bronze
Men	Evgeni Plushenko	Sergei Voronov	Artem Borodulin
Ladies	Ksenia Makarova	Alena Leonova	Elizaveta Tuktamysheva
Pairs	Yuko Kavaguti / Alexander Smirnov	Maria Mukhortova / Maxim Trankov	Vera Bazarova / Yuri Larionov
Ice dancing	Oksana Domnina / Maxim Shabalin	Ekaterina Bobrova / Dmitri Soloviev	Ekaterina Rubleva / Ivan Shefer
Junior Championships
Discipline	Gold	Silver	Bronze
Men	Artur Gachinski	Artur Dmitriev Jr.	Mark Shakhmatov
Ladies	Polina Agafonova	Anna Ovcharova	Polina Shelepen
Pairs	Ksenia Stolbova / Fedor Klimov	Tatiana Novik / Mikhail Kuznetsov	Anna Silaeva / Artur Minchuk
Ice dancing	Ksenia Monko / Kirill Khaliavin	Elena Ilinykh / Nikita Katsalapov	Ekaterina Pushkash / Jonathan Guerreiro
Cup Final
Discipline	Gold	Silver	Bronze
Men	Mark Shakhmatov	Sergei Dobrin	Denis Leushin
Ladies	Elizaveta Tuktamysheva	Katarina Gerboldt	Sofia Biryukova
Pairs	Anastasia Martusheva / Alexei Rogonov	Kristina Astakhova / Nikita Bochkov	Ekaterina Sheremetieva / Egor Chudin
Ice dancing	Ekaterina Rubleva / Ivan Shefer	Ekaterina Riazanova / Ilia Tkachenko	Julia Zlobina / Alexei Sitnikov
Junior men	Gordei Gorshkov	Zhan Bush	Artemiy Punin
Junior ladies	Polina Shelepen	Kristina Zaseeva	Yulia Lipnitskaya
Junior pairs	Ekaterina Petaikina / Maxim Kurdyukov	Tatiana Danilova / Andrei Novoselov	Valeria Grechukhina / Andrei Filonov
Junior ice dancing	Victoria Sinitsina / Ruslan Zhiganshin	Tatiana Baturintseva / Ivan Volobuiev	Angelina Telegina / Valentin Molotov
Youth Championships – Elder Age
Discipline	Gold	Silver	Bronze
Men	Konstantin Milyukov	Feodosiy Efremenkov	Artemiy Punin
Ladies	Yulia Lipnitskaya	Rosa Sheveleva	Elizaveta Tuktamysheva
Pairs	Ekaterina Petaikina / Maxim Kurdyukov	Ekaterina Kuklina / Eduard Kushtanov	Kristina Astakhova / Nikita Bochkov
Ice dancing	Victoria Sinitsina / Ruslan Zhiganshin	Valeria Starygina / Nikolai Moroshkin	Valeria Loseva / Denis Lunin
Youth Championships – Younger Age
Discipline	Gold	Silver	Bronze
Men	Vladislav Tarasenko	Alexander Samarin	Dmitry Mikhailov
Ladies	Daria Medvedeva	Yulia Lipnitskaya	Daria Afanasyeva

== Senior results ==
=== Men ===
Rank	Name	City	Total points	SP		FS	
1	Evgeni Plushenko	Saint Petersburg	271.59	1	100.09	1	171.50
2	Sergei Voronov	Saint Petersburg	240.01	2	95.64	4	144.37
3	Artem Borodulin	Moscow	234.92	3	84.42	2	150.50
4	Konstantin Menshov	Saint Petersburg	228.71	4	80.66	3	148.05
5	Denis Leushin	Moscow	217.21	6	78.40	5	138.81
6	Ivan Tretiakov	Moscow	215.68	5	78.63	6	137.05
7	Artem Grigoriev	Moscow	197.49	7	70.12	8	127.37
8	Gordei Gorshkov	Saint Petersburg	193.83	11	63.81	7	130.02
9	Nikita Mikhailov	Moscow	192.96	9	67.40	10	125.56
10	Mark Shakhmatov	Moscow	187.91	12	63.56	11	124.35
11	Vladimir Uspenski	Moscow	184.18	10	66.04	13	118.14
12	Sergei Dobrin	Moscow	183.87	8	68.58	14	115.29
13	Artur Gachinski	Saint Petersburg	179.99	14	59.84	12	120.15
14	Artur Dmitriev Jr.	Saint Petersburg	179.51	17	53.15	9	126.36
15	Alexander Uspenski	Moscow	174.04	16	58.86	15	115.18
16	Stanislav Kovalev	Moscow	166.68	13	61.49	16	105.19
17	Zhan Bush	Chelyabinsk	162.18	15	58.91	17	103.27
18	Konstantin Milyukov	Kazan	141.96	18	52.22	18	89.74

=== Ladies ===
Rank	Name	City	Total points	SP		FS	
1	Ksenia Makarova	Saint Petersburg	178.90	2	62.75	3	116.15
2	Alena Leonova	Saint Petersburg	175.89	4	55.70	2	120.19
3	Elizaveta Tuktamisheva	Saint Petersburg	173.53	10	48.96	1	124.57
4	Adelina Sotnikova	Moscow	172.69	3	59.77	4	112.92
5	Anna Ovcharova	Moscow	157.53	5	55.17	5	102.36
6	Sofia Biryukova	Moscow	154.56	1	62.97	7	91.59
7	Oksana Gozeva	Moscow	143.51	11	48.79	6	94.72
8	Kristina Zaseeva	Moscow	139.52	6	54.76	9	84.76
9	Katarina Gerboldt	Moscow	135.80	7	53.50	10	82.30
10	Polina Agafonova	Saint Petersburg	130.17	13	42.87	8	87.30
11	Ekaterina Kozyreva	Moscow	124.38	8	51.59	11	72.79
12	Maria Artemieva	Saint Petersburg	122.87	9	50.38	12	72.49
13	Ksenya Doronina	Saint Petersburg	118.81	12	48.46	13	70.35
14	Nina Petushkova	Moscow	103.73	14	38.31	14	65.42

=== Pairs ===
Rank	Name	City	Total points	SP		FS	
1	Yuko Kavaguti / Alexander Smirnov	Saint Petersburg	220.61	1	78.01	1	142.60
2	Maria Mukhortova / Maxim Trankov	Saint Petersburg	208.78	2	74.82	2	133.96
3	Vera Bazarova / Yuri Larionov	Perm	178.65	3	62.26	3	116.39
4	Lubov Iliushechkina / Nodari Maisuradze	Moscow	170.49	4	59.67	4	110.82
5	Tatiana Novik / Mikhail Kuznetsov	Moscow	161.27	5	56.86	5	104.41
6	Ksenia Ozerova / Alexander Enbert	Saint Petersburg	147.20	12	43.00	6	104.20
7	Ekaterina Petaikina / Maxim Kurdyukov	Moscow	143.27	6	52.00	7	91.27
8	Ekaterina Sheremetieva / Egor Chudin	Moscow	136.21	8	47.57	9	88.64
9	Anastasia Martusheva / Alexei Rogonov	Moscow	135.77	9	46.98	8	88.79
10	Sabina Imaikina / Semen Stepanov	Perm	127.89	10	45.77	10	82.12
11	Ekaterina Kuklina / Eduard Kushtanov	Perm	123.41	11	45.02	11	78.39
WD	Ksenya Krasilnikova / Konstantin Bezmaternikh	Perm		7	51.79		

=== Ice dancing ===
Rank	Name	City	Total points	CD		OD		FD	
1	Oksana Domnina / Maxim Shabalin	Moscow Oblast	214.77	1	45.17	1	66.54	1	103.06
2	Ekaterina Bobrova / Dmitri Soloviev	Moscow	189.29	2	37.61	4	56.73	2	94.95
3	Ekaterina Rubleva / Ivan Shefer	Moscow	188.46	4	36.43	2	57.98	3	94.05
4	Ekaterina Riazanova / Ilia Tkachenko	Moscow Oblast	186.29	3	36.68	3	57.24	4	92.37
5	Julia Zlobina / Alexei Sitnikov	Moscow	167.70	7	32.96	6	51.16	6	83.58
6	Kristina Gorshkova / Vitali Butikov	Moscow	167.14	6	33.65	7	47.63	5	85.86
7	Anastasia Platonova / Alexander Grachev	Moscow	163.05	5	33.91	5	52.68	7	76.46
8	Aleksandra Chistyakova / Vladimir Kurochkin	Moscow	134.18	8	26.63	9	37.96	8	69.59
9	Olga Kolotilina / Aleksandr Bortsov	Moscow Oblast	122.20	9	22.06	8	39.31	9	60.83

- Jana Khoklova / Sergei Novitski did not compete here but were placed on the European, Olympic, and World team because of their status as Russian Champions of the previous two years.

== Junior results ==
The 2010 Russian Junior Figure Skating Championships were held between February 3 and 6, 2010 in Saransk. The results were used to choose the teams to the 2010 World Junior Championships.

=== Men ===
Rank	Name	City	Total points	SP		FS	
1	Artur Gachinski	Saint Petersburg	212.85	1	72.06	1	140.79
2	Artur Dmitriev Jr.	Saint Petersburg	211.74	2	71.42	3	140.32
3	Mark Shakhmatov	Moscow	207.41	4	67.07	2	140.34
4	Gordei Gorshkov	Saint Petersburg	183.52	12	55.41	4	128.11
5	Zhan Bush	Chelyabinsk	179.89	6	63.12	6	116.77
6	Stanislav Kovalev	Moscow	178.87	7	60.51	5	118.36
7	Alexandr Nikolaev	Moscow	177.43	3	68.24	8	109.19
8	Alexander Stepanov	Moscow	169.35	10	55.87	7	113.48
9	Konstantin Milyukov	Kazan	160.82	13	54.22	9	106.60
10	Sergei Alexeev	Moscow	158.73	9	56.29	10	102.44
11	Feodosiy Efremenkov	Moscow	152.24	11	55.42	12	96.82
12	Ivan Bich	Saint Petersburg	150.25	15	52.74	11	97.51
13	Artemiy Punin	Moscow	147.28	8	57.26	14	90.02
14	Sergei Borodulin	Moscow	146.63	14	54.20	13	92.43
WD	Artem Grigoriev	Moscow		5	65.17		

=== Ladies ===
Rank	Name	City	Total points	SP		FS	
1	Polina Agafonova	Saint Petersburg	166.71	2	58.52	2	108.19
2	Anna Ovcharova	Moscow	163.87	8	54.41	1	109.46
3	Polina Shelepen	Moscow	159.34	10	53.49	3	105.85
4	Elizaveta Tuktamysheva	Saint Petersburg	159.01	9	54.12	4	104.89
5	Yulia Lipnitskaya	Moscow	155.50	5	55.66	5	99.84
6	Adelina Sotnikova	Moscow	150.78	4	57.28	6	93.50
7	Sofia Biryukova	Moscow	149.70	3	57.62	7	92.08
8	Maria Artemieva	Saint Petersburg	145.12	7	54.53	9	90.59
9	Kristina Zaseeva	Moscow	144.42	1	60.51	12	83.91
10	Polina Korobeynikova	Moscow	142.03	12	50.05	8	91.98
11	Elena Radionova	Moscow	131.38	18	41.08	10	90.30
12	Valeria Kachalina	Saint Petersburg	130.82	11	53.32	15	77.50
13	Daria Medvedeva	Saint Petersburg	130.81	6	55.62	16	75.19
14	Ekaterina Frolova	Moscow	130.16	15	45.49	11	84.67
15	Maria Stavitskaia	Saint Petersburg	125.27	14	46.22	13	79.05
16	Rosa Sheveleva	Moscow Oblast	122.92	13	47.00	14	77.92
17	Anna Shershak	Moscow	110.81	16	44.76	17	66.05
18	Daria Afanasieva	TOL	109.48	17	43.59	18	65.89
19	Maria Sharova	SAR	94.13	19	38.80	19	55.33

=== Pairs ===
Rank	Name	City	Total points	SP		FS	
1	Ksenia Stolbova / Fedor Klimov	Saint Petersburg	167.18	1	60.04	1	107.14
2	Tatiana Novik / Mikhail Kuznetsov	Moscow	157.46	2	58.35	3	99.11
3	Anna Silaeva / Artur Minchuk	Saint Petersburg	151.75	3	51.33	2	100.42
4	Ekaterina Petaikina / Maxim Kurdyukov	Moscow	147.01	5	50.48	4	96.53
5	Alexandra Vasilieva / Yuri Shevchuk	Saint Petersburg	144.85	6	50.00	5	94.85
6	Ekaterina Kuklina / Eduard Kushtanov	Perm	138.06	4	50.75	8	87.31
7	Kristina Astakhova / Nikita Bochkov	Moscow	138.00	7	49.76	7	88.24
8	Tatiana Danilova / Andrei Novoselov	Moscow	136.40	8	49.73	9	86.67
9	Elizaveta Semenova / Maxim Petukhov	Perm	131.24	11	41.00	6	90.24
10	Irina Moiseeva / Vladimir Morozov	Moscow	121.76	9	46.60	10	75.16
11	Elizaveta Makarova / Alexei Shemet	Moscow	108.47	12	38.38	11	70.09
WD	Valeria Morozova / Denis Golubev	Saint Petersburg		10	42.53		

=== Ice dancing ===
Rank	Name	City	Total points	CD		OD		FD	
1	Ksenia Monko / Kirill Khaliavin	Moscow	193.43	1	38.69	1	61.10	1	93.64
2	Elena Ilinykh / Nikita Katsalapov	Moscow	184.51	2	36.85	2	60.00	2	87.66
3	Ekaterina Pushkash / Jonathan Guerreiro	Moscow	175.95	3	36.56	4	53.85	3	85.54
4	Marina Antipova / Artem Kudashev	TOL	170.61	4	34.88	3	54.13	4	81.60
5	Valeria Zenkova / Valerie Sinitsin	Moscow	161.46	5	32.69	6	51.97	6	76.80
6	Victoria Sinitsina / Ruslan Zhiganshin	Moscow	160.51	7	31.25	5	52.14	5	77.12
7	Aleksandra Stepanova / Ivan Bukin	Moscow	149.92	8	30.18	7	47.36	9	72.38
8	Angelina Telegina / Valentin Molotov	MOR	148.93	9	28.38	10	45.60	7	74.95
9	Tatiana Baturintseva / Ivan Volobuiev	Moscow	148.19	6	32.19	9	45.95	10	70.05
10	Valeria Starygina / Nikolai Moroshkin	TOL	144.73	13	26.04	8	46.13	8	72.56
11	Inga Ruchkina / Semen Kozhevnikov	TOL	137.79	10	27.16	11	43.09	12	67.54
12	Evgenia Kosigina / Sergey Mozgov	Moscow Oblast	136.40	14	26.03	13	41.52	11	68.85
13	Anna Yanovskaia / Egor Kosheev	Moscow	135.33	11	26.28	12	41.55	13	67.50
14	Ksenya Antipova / Konstantin Kolganov	Moscow	132.81	12	26.23	14	40.80	14	65.78
15	Valeria Loseva / Denis Lunin	Moscow	130.07	15	25.90	15	40.16	15	64.01

== International team selections ==
=== Winter Olympic ===
	Men	Ladies	Pairs	Ice dancing
1	Evgeni Plushenko	Ksenia Makarova	Yuko Kavaguti / Alexander Smirnov	Oksana Domnina / Maxim Shabalin
2	Artem Borodulin	Alena Leonova	Maria Mukhortova / Maxim Trankov	Ekaterina Bobrova / Dmitri Soloviev
3			Vera Bazarova / Yuri Larionov	Jana Khokhlova / Sergei Novitski
1st alternate	Sergei Voronov	Oksana Gozeva	Lubov Iliushechkina / Nodari Maisuradze	Ekaterina Rubleva / Ivan Shefer
2nd alternate	Konstantin Menshov	Katarina Gerboldt	Tatiana Novik / Mikhail Kuznetsov	Ekaterina Riazanova / Ilia Tkachenko

=== World Championships ===
	Men	Ladies	Pairs	Ice dancing
1	Artem Borodulin	Alena Leonova	Yuko Kavaguti / Alexander Smirnov	Oksana Domnina / Maxim Shabalin
2	Sergei Voronov	Ksenia Makarova	Maria Mukhortova / Maxim Trankov	Ekaterina Bobrova / Dmitri Soloviev
3			Vera Bazarova / Yuri Larionov	Jana Khokhlova / Sergei Novitski
1st alternate				Ekaterina Rubleva / Ivan Shefer

=== European Championships ===
	Men	Ladies	Pairs	Ice dancing
1	Evgeni Plushenko	Ksenia Makarova	Yuko Kavaguti / Alexander Smirnov	Oksana Domnina / Maxim Shabalin
2	Sergei Voronov	Alena Leonova	Maria Mukhortova / Maxim Trankov	Ekaterina Bobrova / Dmitri Soloviev
3		Oksana Gozeva	Vera Bazarova / Yuri Larionov	Jana Khokhlova / Sergei Novitski
1st alternate	Artem Borodulin	Katarina Gerboldt	Lubov Iliushechkina / Nodari Maisuradze	Ekaterina Rubleva / Ivan Shefer

=== World Junior Championships ===
	Men	Ladies	Pairs	Ice dancing
1	Artur Dmitriev Jr.	Polina Agafonova	Tatiana Novik / Mikhail Kuznetsov	Elena Ilinykh / Nikita Katsalapov
2	Artur Gachinsky	Anna Ovcharova	Anna Silaeva / Artur Minchuk	Ksenia Monko / Kirill Khaliavin
3		Polina Shelepen	Ksenia Stolbova / Fedor Klimov	Ekaterina Pushkash / Jonathan Guerreiro
