= Anna Ovcharova =

Russian figure skater

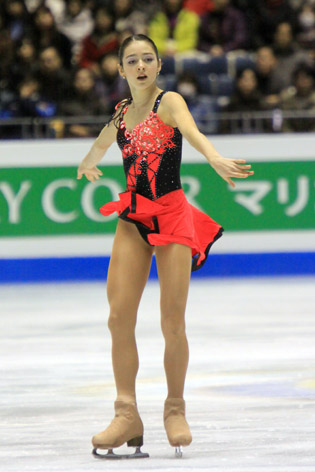
- Ovcharova in 2009

Personal information
- Native name: Анна Серге́евна Овчарова
- Full name: Anna Sergeyevna Ovcharova
- Born: 16 March 1996 (age 30) Moscow, Russia
- Height: 1.64 m (5 ft 4 1/2 in)

Figure skating career
- Country: Switzerland (2013–15); Russia (until 2012)
- Skating club: CP de Geneve
- Began skating: 2001
- Retired: 14 April 2015

Medal record
Representing Switzerland
Swiss Championships
Gold medal – first place	2014 La Chaux-de-Fonds	Singles
Silver medal – second place	2013 Geneva	Singles
Silver medal – second place	2015 Lugano	Singles

Anna Sergeyevna Ovcharova (Russian: Анна Серге́евна Овчарова; born 16 March 1996) is a Russian figure skater. In 2013, she began competing for Switzerland. She is the 2014 Bavarian Open silver medalist, 2014 Challenge Cup bronze medalist, and 2014 Swiss national champion. For Russia, she is the 2011 Cup of Nice bronze medalist, 2010 Russian national junior silver medalist, and placed fifth at the 2010 World Junior Championships.

== Early life, family, and education ==
Anna Sergeyevna Ovcharova was born on 16 March 1996 in Moscow.

Ovcharova began skating at age four, taught initially by Marina Cherkasova. At age seven, she began training at CSKA Moscow under the guidance of Elena Blagova, who would teach her double and triple jumps. Svetlana Sokolovskaya began coaching Ovcharova when she was about eleven years old.

She graduated from Collège du Léman in Geneva, class of 2014.

== Skating career ==
=== For Russia ===
Ovcharova made her international debut in the 2009–10 season on the Junior Grand Prix series. She placed fifth in her first JGP event in August 2009 in Hungary and then won silver in September in Poland. Her results qualified her for the JGP Final where she finished fifth. After winning the silver medal at the Russian Junior Championships, Ovcharova was assigned to the 2010 World Junior Championships. She placed first in the short program — winning a small gold medal for the segment — eighth in the free skate, and fifth overall.

Later in 2010, Ovcharova underwent laser treatment on a small cyst in her leg but her condition only worsened. She was then diagnosed with two large cysts and incipient bone necrosis, leading to surgery in Geneva in 2011 and in Moscow in 2012.

Ovcharova won the bronze medal at the 2011 Cup of Nice in October 2011. It was her last international appearance representing Russia.

=== For Switzerland ===
In December 2011, Ovcharova began training with Peter Grütter in Geneva, Switzerland. In the 2012–13 season, she was the silver medalist at the Swiss Nationals. In spring 2013, she performed in Music on Ice shows.

In 2013–14, Ovcharova made her international debut for Switzerland. She placed 16th at the Cup of Nice and 9th at the Ice Challenge in autumn 2013. After taking gold at the Swiss Championships, she won her first international medals for her new country, silver at the 2014 Bavarian Open and bronze at the 2014 Challenge Cup. Ovcharova was named in the Swiss team to the 2014 World Championships in Saitama, Japan. Ranked 17th in the short program, she qualified for the free skate and finished 20th overall.

Ovcharova's first Grand Prix invitations came in the 2014–15 season. After placing 12th at the 2014 Trophée Éric Bompard and 11th at the 2014 NHK Trophy, she finished second to Eveline Brunner at the Swiss Championships. Ovcharova was not named in the Swiss team to the 2015 European Championships in Stockholm. Although selected for the World Championships in Shanghai, after a poor performance at the Hellmut Seibt Memorial she decided to cede the spot to Brunner.

On 14 April 2015 Ovcharova announced her retirement from competitive figure skating on her Ask.fm account.

== Programs ==
Season	Short program	Free skating	Exhibition
2014–2015	Butterflies Are Free by Alfred Schnittke	Mon Dieu; Milord performed by Édith Piaf	
2013–2014	Gypsies - Folk Music performed by Ensemble of Moiseev	Chattanooga Choo Choo; Sunlight Serenade; In The Mood by Glenn Miller	
2012–2013	Ballet	Memoirs of a Geisha by John Williams	Puttin' on the Ritz
2011–2012	Common Threads by Bobby McFerrin; Knock on Wood performed by Safri Duo	A Chorus Line	
2009–2010	Jazz medley	Don Quixote by Ludwig Minkus	Honey, Honey performed by Amanda Seyfried

== Competitive highlights ==
GP: Grand Prix; CS: Challenger Series (began in the 2014–15 season); JGP: Junior Grand Prix

=== For Switzerland ===
International
Event	2012–13	2013–14	2014–15
World Championships		20th	
GP NHK Trophy			11th
GP Trophée Bompard			12th
CS Nebelhorn Trophy			10th
CS Volvo Open Cup			WD
Bavarian Open		2nd	
Challenge Cup		3rd	
Cup of Nice		16th	
Ice Challenge		9th	
National
Swiss Championships	2nd	1st	2nd
WD = Withdrew

=== For Russia ===
International
Event	2008–09	2009–10	2011–12
Cup of Nice			3rd
International: Junior
World Junior Champ.		5th	
JGP Final		5th	
JGP Hungary		5th	
JGP Poland		2nd	
National
Russian Champ.		5th	17th
Russian Junior Champ.	16th	2nd	
Ovcharova did not compete in the 2010–11 season.

== Detailed results ==
(Small medals for short and free programs awarded only at ISU Championships.)

2011–2012 season
Date	Event	Level	SP	FS	Result
25–29 December 2011	2012 Russian Championships	Senior	14; 52.51	18; 82.16	17; 134.67
2009–2010 season
Date	Event	Level	SP	FS	Result
8–14 March 2010	2010 ISU World Junior Championships	Junior	1; 59.80	8; 87.72	5; 147.52
3–6 February 2010	2010 Russian Junior Championships	Junior	8; 54.41	1; 109.46	2; 163.87
23–27 December 2009	2010 Russian Championships	Senior	5; 55.17	5; 102.36	5; 157.53
3–6 December 2009	2009–10 ISU Junior Grand Prix Final	Junior	4; 54.92	6; 90.04	5; 144.96
9–13 September 2009	2009 ISU Junior Grand Prix, Poland	Junior	2; 54.21	2; 88.50	2; 142.71
26–30 August 2009	2009 ISU Junior Grand Prix, Hungary	Junior	6; 45.39	6; 74.49	5; 119.88
