= Tatiana Novik =

Russian pair skater (born 1994)

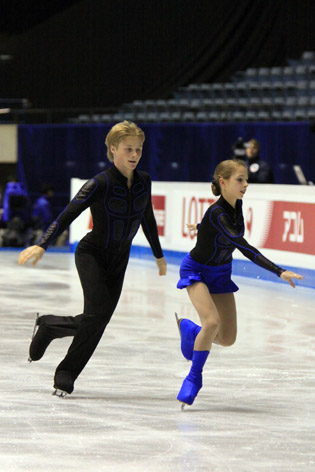
- Novik/Kuznetsov in 2009

Personal information
- Full name: Tatiana Germanovna Novik
- Born: 24 October 1994 (age 32) Moscow, Russia
- Height: 1.56 m (5 ft 1 1/2 in)

Figure skating career
- Country: Russia
- Coach: Nina Mozer
- Skating club: Vorobievie Gory Moscow

Tatiana Germanovna Novik (Russian: Татьяна Германовна Новик; born 24 October 1994) is a Russian pair skater. With Andrei Novoselov, she is the 2012 Toruń Cup champion. With Mikhail Kuznetsov, she placed fourth at the 2010 World Junior Championships and took bronze at the 2010 International Cup of Nice.

== Career ==
Novik teamed up with Mikhail Kuznetsov in spring 2009. They won the silver medal at the 2010 Russian Junior Championships and placed 4th at the 2010 World Junior Championships. They were coached by Nina Mozer in Moscow and split at the end of the 2010–11 season.

Later in 2011, Novik began skating with Andrei Novoselov. They placed fourth at the 2011 Ice Challenge and eighth at the 2012 Russian Championships before winning the 2012 Toruń Cup. The pair entered the 2013 Nebelhorn Trophy, intending to represent Romania, but did not compete at the event.

== Programs ==
(with Kuznetsov)

Season	Short program	Free skating
2010–2011	Somewhere in Time by John Barry	West Side Story by Leonard Bernstein
2009–2010	The Barber of Seville by Gioachino Rossini	Dolan's Cadillac

== Competitive highlights ==
=== With Novoselov ===
International
Event	2011–12	2012–13	2013–14
Ice Challenge	4th		
Nebelhorn Trophy			WD
Toruń Cup	1st		
National
Russian Championships	8th		
WD = Withdrew

=== With Kuznetsov ===
International
Event	2009–10	2010–11
GP Cup of Russia		8th
Cup of Nice		3rd
International: Junior
World Junior Champ.	4th	
JGP Final	4th	
JGP Germany	5th	
JGP Poland	2nd	
National
Russian Champ.	5th	
Russian Junior Champ.	2nd	
GP = Grand Prix; JGP = Junior Grand Prix
