= Ksenia Makarova =

Russian figure skater (born 1992)

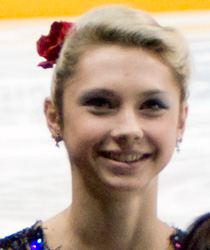
- Makarova in 2010

Personal information
- Native name: Ксения Олеговна Макарова
- Full name: Ksenia Olegovna Makarova
- Born: 20 December 1992 (age 33) Saint Petersburg, Russia
- Home town: Newburgh, New York, United States
- Height: 1.67 m (5 ft 5 1/2 in)

Figure skating career
- Country: Russia
- Skating club: St. Petersburg Figure Skating Academy
- Began skating: 2001
- Retired: February 19, 2014

Ksenia Olegovna Makarova (Russian: Ксения Олеговна Макарова, born 20 December 1992) is a retired Russian, later an American, figure skater. She is the 2010 Skate Canada International silver medalist, 2009 Cup of Nice champion, and 2010 Russian national champion. She represented Russia at the 2010 Winter Olympics, where she placed 10th.

== Personal life ==
Makarova was born on 20 December 1992 in Saint Petersburg. She is the daughter of retired pair skaters Larisa Selezneva and Oleg Makarov, the 1984 Olympic bronze medalists. She has a brother, Alexei, who is nine years younger. Her family immigrated to the United States when she was 8 years old.

Makarova was an honors student at Newburgh Free Academy in Newburgh, New York. She became a naturalized U.S. citizen on 16 August 2013.

== Career ==
Makarova did not care for skating when she first stepped onto the ice at age 6 but a couple years later, after her family had moved to the U.S., she tried skating again and began to like it.

She began competing in the United States in the 2003–04 season at the intermediate level, where she placed 7th at her regional championship. The following season, again competing as an intermediate, she won the pewter medal at her regional championship and went on to place 15th at the U.S. Junior Championships. In the 2005–2006 season, competing for the final time as an Intermediate, she won her regional championship, but had to withdraw from the U.S. Junior Championships. She moved up to the novice level in the 2006–07 season. She won her regional championship and placed 2nd at her sectional event to qualify for the 2007 U.S. Championships, where she placed 7th. While competing for the United States, she represented the Hudson Valley Figure Skating Club, and she continued to represent that club in the United States while advancing in the U.S. Figure Skating testing structure.

Makarova switched to competing for Russia in 2007. At the 2008 Russian Junior Championships, she placed fourth in both segments of the competition to place 4th overall. In the 2008–09 season, she debuted on the ISU Junior Grand Prix. At her first event, the 2008–09 ISU Junior Grand Prix in Madrid, she won the short program and placed 8th in the free skate to place 4th overall. In her second event, in Sheffield, she placed 3rd in the short program and 4th in the free skate to place 4th overall. At the 2009 Russian Junior Championships, she placed 5th.

=== 2009–2010 season ===
In the 2009–10 season, Makarova began being coached by Galina Zmievskaya and Viktor Petrenko in Hackensack, New Jersey, and Nina Petrenko was her choreographer. Makarova competed on the 2009–10 ISU Junior Grand Prix series. At her first event, in Lake Placid, New York, she placed 4th in the short program and second in the free skate to win the silver medal. At her second event, in Belarus, she placed 2nd in the short program and 3rd in the free skating to win the bronze medal. This qualified her for the Junior Grand Prix Final. She then competed at the 2009 Coupe Internationale de Nice senior-level competition, which she won after winning both segments of the competition. She placed 4th at the Junior Grand Prix Final after placing third in the short program and fourth in the free skating.

Second in the short program and third in the free skate at the 2010 Russian Championships, Makarova finished first overall and qualified for the 2010 European Championships and 2010 Winter Olympics. At Europeans, she placed ninth in the short and long program to finish ninth overall. At the Olympics, Makarova placed twelfth in the short program, ninth in the free skate, and finished tenth overall behind teammate Alena Leonova. At Worlds, Makarova earned a personal best in the short program with 62.06 points. She was eighth in the free skate and finished eighth overall.

=== 2010–present ===
During the 2010–11 season, she won silver at 2010 Skate Canada International, her first medal on the senior Grand Prix series and placed seventh at the 2010 Rostelecom Cup. At the 2011 Russian Championships, Makarova placed first in the short program and sixth in the free skate, finishing fifth overall. In January 2011, she changed coaches to Evgeni Rukavicin in Saint Petersburg, Russia. Makarova placed fourth at the 2011 European Championships. She finished seventh at Worlds.

In the 2011–2012 season, Makarova competed at the 2011 Cup of China and the 2011 Skate America. She placed seventh at the 2011 Cup of China and fifth at the 2011 Skate America. She placed fourth at 2012 Russian Nationals. Makarova competed at the 2012 European Championships and finished sixth. At the 2012 Worlds, she placed ninth.

Makarova sustained a hip injury in 2013. Hampered by the hip injury, she retired in 2013; as of 2014, she was working as a coach.

== Programs ==
Event	Short program	Free skating	Exhibition
2012–2013	Maria and the Violin's String by Ashram choreo. by Ilia Averbukh	Megapolis choreo. by Ilia Averbukh	
2011–2012	Maria and the Violin's String by Ashram choreo. by Ilia Averbukh	20th Century Fox Fanfare by Alfred Newman; Diamonds Are a Girl's Best Friend by Jule Styne; I Wanna Be Loved by You by Herbert Stothart, Harry Ruby choreo. by Olga Glinka	
2010–2011	Flamenco by Didulia	Evita by Andrew Lloyd Webber	Sway by The Pussycat Dolls
2009–2010	Ladies in Lavender by Nigel Hess	The 13th Warrior by Jerry Goldsmith	Sway by The Pussycat Dolls
2008–2009	Cirque du Soleil	Mr. & Mrs. Smith (2005 film)	
2007–2008	In the Hall of the Mountain King by Edvard Grieg	Don Quixote by Ludwig Minkus	
2006–2007	Libertango by Astor Piazzolla	Chicago	

== Competitive highlights ==
=== Results for Russia ===
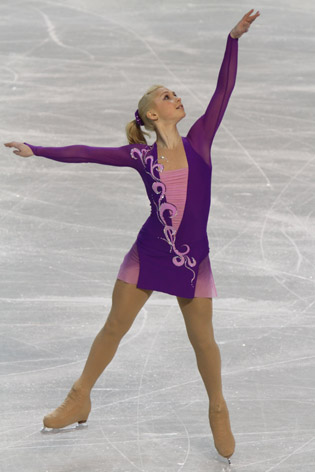
Makarova performs at the 2010 European Figure Skating Championships in Tallinn, Estonia.

International
Event	2007–08	2008–09	2009–10	2010–11	2011–12	2012–13
Olympics			10th			
Worlds			8th	7th	9th	
Europeans			9th	4th	6th	
GP Cup of China					7th	
GP NHK Trophy						7th
GP Rostelecom				7th		
GP Skate America					5th	
GP Skate Canada				2nd		6th
Cup of Nice			1st			
Finlandia				4th		
Nebelhorn					WD	
International: Junior
JGP Final			4th			
JGP Belarus			3rd			
JGP Spain		4th				
JGP U.K.		4th				
JGP USA			2nd			
National
Russian			1st	5th	4th	8th
Russian Junior	4th	5th				
GP = Grand Prix; JGP = Junior Grand Prix; WD = Withdrew

=== Results for the United States ===
Event	2003–04	2004–05	2005–06	2006–07
U.S. Championships				7th N.
U.S. Junior Championships		15th I.	WD	
Eastern Sectionals				2nd N.
North Atlantic Regionals	7th I.	4th I.	1st I.	1st N.
Levels: I. = Intermediate; N. = Novice; WD = Withdrew
