= Mikhail Kuznetsov (figure skater) =

Russian pair skater

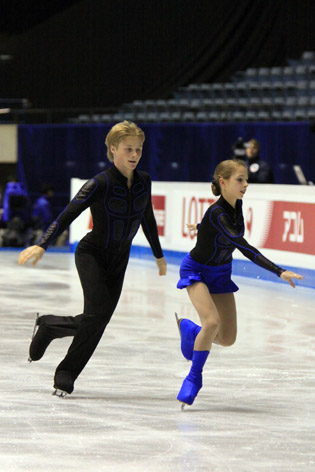
- Novik/Kuznetsov in 2009

Personal information
- Full name: Mikhail Vladimirovich Kuznetsov
- Born: 6 July 1988 (age 38) Chelyabinsk, Russian SFSR, Soviet Union
- Height: 1.74 m (5 ft 9 in)

Figure skating career
- Country: Russia
- Coach: Nina Mozer
- Skating club: Vorobievie Gory Moscow
Medal record
Representing Russia
Figure skating: Pairs
Junior Grand Prix Final
Silver medal – second place	2007–08 Gdańsk	Pairs

Mikhail Vladimirovich Kuznetsov (Russian: Михаил Владимирович Кузнецов; born 6 July 1988) is a Russian pair skater. With Ekaterina Sheremetieva, he is the 2007 ISU Junior Grand Prix Final silver medalist. With later partner Tatiana Novik, he placed fourth at the 2010 World Junior Championships and took bronze at the 2010 International Cup of Nice.

== Career ==
Kuznetsov teamed up with Ekaterina Sheremetieva in 2003.

Sheremetieva broke her foot in 2006 and, as a result, the pair missed most of the 2006–2007 season. Although they placed third on the day, Sheremetieva/Kuznetsov were later awarded the silver medal from the 2007–08 ISU Junior Grand Prix Final following the retroactive disqualification of Vera Bazarova / Yuri Larionov due to a positive doping sample from Larionov. Sheremetieva/Kuznetsov made their senior international debut at the 2008 Nebelhorn Trophy, placing 5th. They missed part of the 2008-2009 season due to injury. Their partnership ended following that season.

Kuznetsov teamed up with Tatiana Novik in spring 2009. They won the silver medal at the 2010 Russian Junior Championships and placed 4th at the 2010 World Junior Championships. They were coached by Nina Mozer in Moscow and split at the end of the 2010–11 season.

== Programs ==
=== With Novik ===
Season	Short program	Free skating
2010–2011	Somewhere in Time by John Barry	West Side Story by Leonard Bernstein
2009–2010	The Barber of Seville by Gioachino Rossini	Dolan's Cadillac

=== With Sheremetieva ===
Season	Short program	Free skating
2008–2009	Wild Dances by Ruslana	Nostradamus by Maksim Mrvica
2007–2008	Winter (from Four Seasons) by Antonio Vivaldi	Nostradamus by Maksim Mrvica

== Competitive highlights ==
=== With Novik ===
International
Event	2009–10	2010–11
GP Cup of Russia		8th
Cup of Nice		3rd
International: Junior
World Junior Champ.	4th	
JGP Final	4th	
JGP Germany	5th	
JGP Poland	2nd	
National
Russian Champ.	5th	
Russian Junior Champ.	2nd	
GP = Grand Prix; JGP = Junior Grand Prix

=== With Sheremetieva ===
International
Event	2005–06	2006–07	2007–08	2008–09
Nebelhorn Trophy				5th
International: Junior
World Junior Champ.			4th	5th
JGP Final			2nd	
JGP Canada	2nd			
JGP Croatia	4th			
JGP Estonia			1st	
JGP Mexico				2nd
JGP United Kingdom			4th	
National
Russian Champ.		8th		
Russian Junior Champ.	7th		4th	2nd
JGP = Junior Grand Prix
