= Kristina Zaseeva =

Russian figure skater

Personal information
- Native name: Кристина Джамбулатовна Засеева
- Full name: Kristina Dzhambulatovna Zaseeva
- Born: 1 October 1996 (age 30) Moscow, Russia
- Home town: Moscow, Russia
- Height: 1.70 m (5 ft 7 in)

Figure skating career
- Country: Russia
- Coach: Elena Vodorezova
- Skating club: CSKA Moscow
- Began skating: 2001

Kristina Dzhambulatovna Zaseeva (Russian: Кристина Джамбулатовна Засеева; born 1 October 1996) is a Russian figure skater. She is the 2012 Coupe de Nice bronze medalist, 2012 Golden Spin of Zagreb silver medalist, and 2012 Triglav Trophy silver medalist.

== Programs ==
Season	Short program	Free skating
2011–2013	Die Fledermaus by Johann Strauss II	The Umbrellas of Cherbourg by Michel Legrand

== Competitive highlights ==
JGP: ISU Junior Grand Prix

International
Event	2009–10	2010–11	2011–12	2012–13
Cup of Nice				3rd
Golden Spin				2nd
NRW Trophy			4th	
Triglav Trophy			2nd	
International: Junior
JGP Croatia				4th
JGP Poland			7th	
JGP Turkey				7th
JGP United Kingdom		14th		
Ice Challenge			1st J.	
National
Russian Champ.	8th			
Russian Jr. Champ.	9th	8th	8th	15th
J. = Junior level
