= Andrei Novoselov =

Russian pair skater (born 1989)

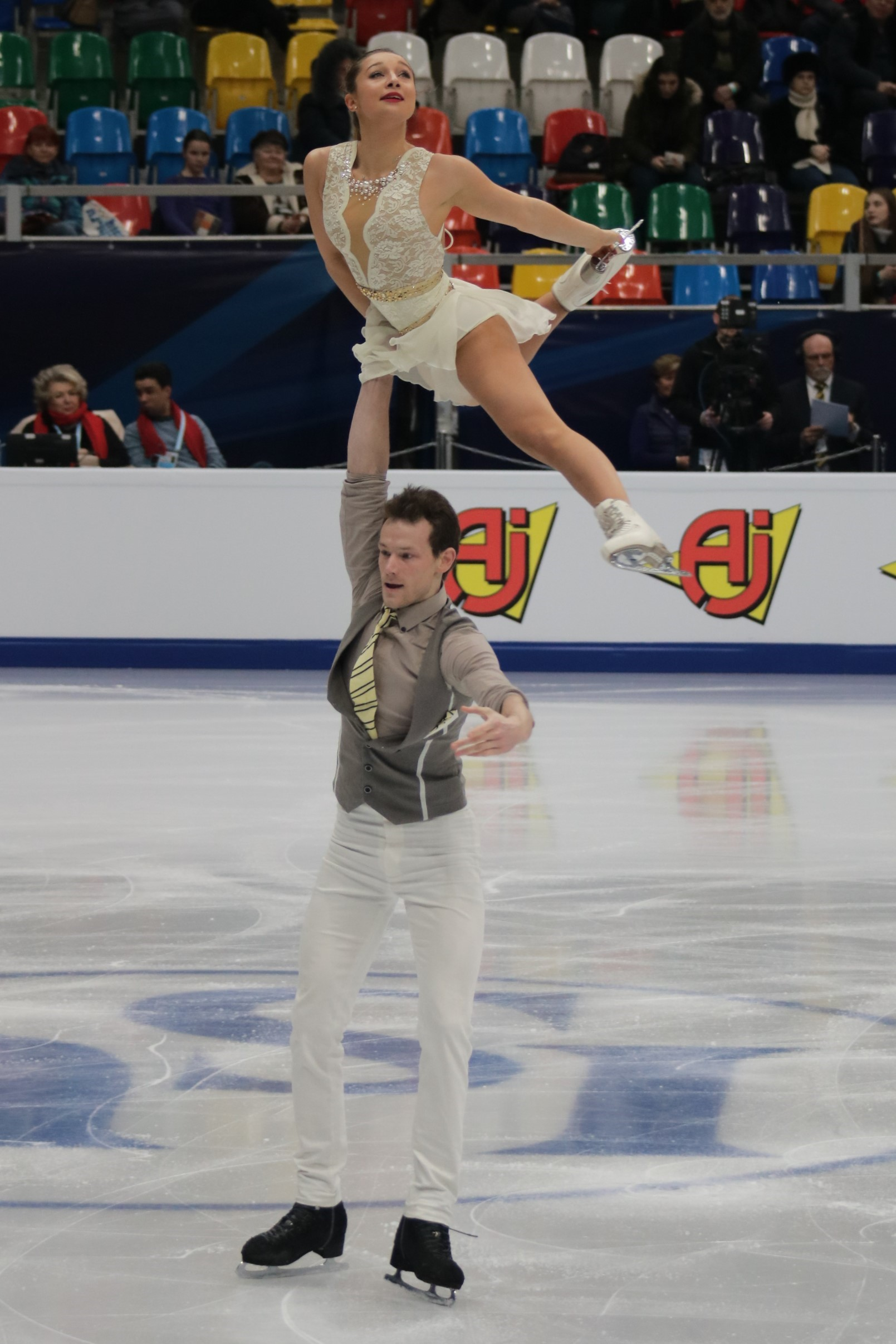
- Lola Esbrat and Andrei Novoselov in 2018

Personal information
- Native name: Андрей Новоселов
- Full name: Andrei Alexandrovich Novoselov
- Born: 24 November 1989 (age 36) Perm, Russian SFSR, Soviet Union
- Height: 1.86 m (6 ft 1 in)

Figure skating career
- Country: Russia
- Partner: Ksenia Stolbova
- Coach: Claude Thevenard
- Skating club: Francais Volants Paris Bercy
- Began skating: 1993

Andrei Alexandrovich Novoselov (Russian: Андрей Александрович Новоселов, romanized: Andrey Alexandrovich Novoselov, born 24 November 1989) is a Russian pair skater. Competing for France with Lola Esbrat, he has won three international medals and is the 2018 French national champion. Earlier, he represented Russia with Tatiana Novik, Tatiana Danilova, and Sabina Imaikina.

== Career for Russia ==
Novoselov began learning to skate in 1993.

=== Partnership with Imaikina ===
In 2007, Novoselov began competing on the ISU Junior Grand Prix (JGP) series with Sabina Imaikina. The following year, they won two silver medals on the JGP series and qualified for the 2008–09 JGP Final, where they placed 5th. At the 2009 Russian Championships, the pair placed fifth on the senior level and took bronze on the junior level. They were coached by Valeri Tiukov and Valentina Tiukova in Perm. They parted ways at the end of the season.

=== Partnership with Danilova ===
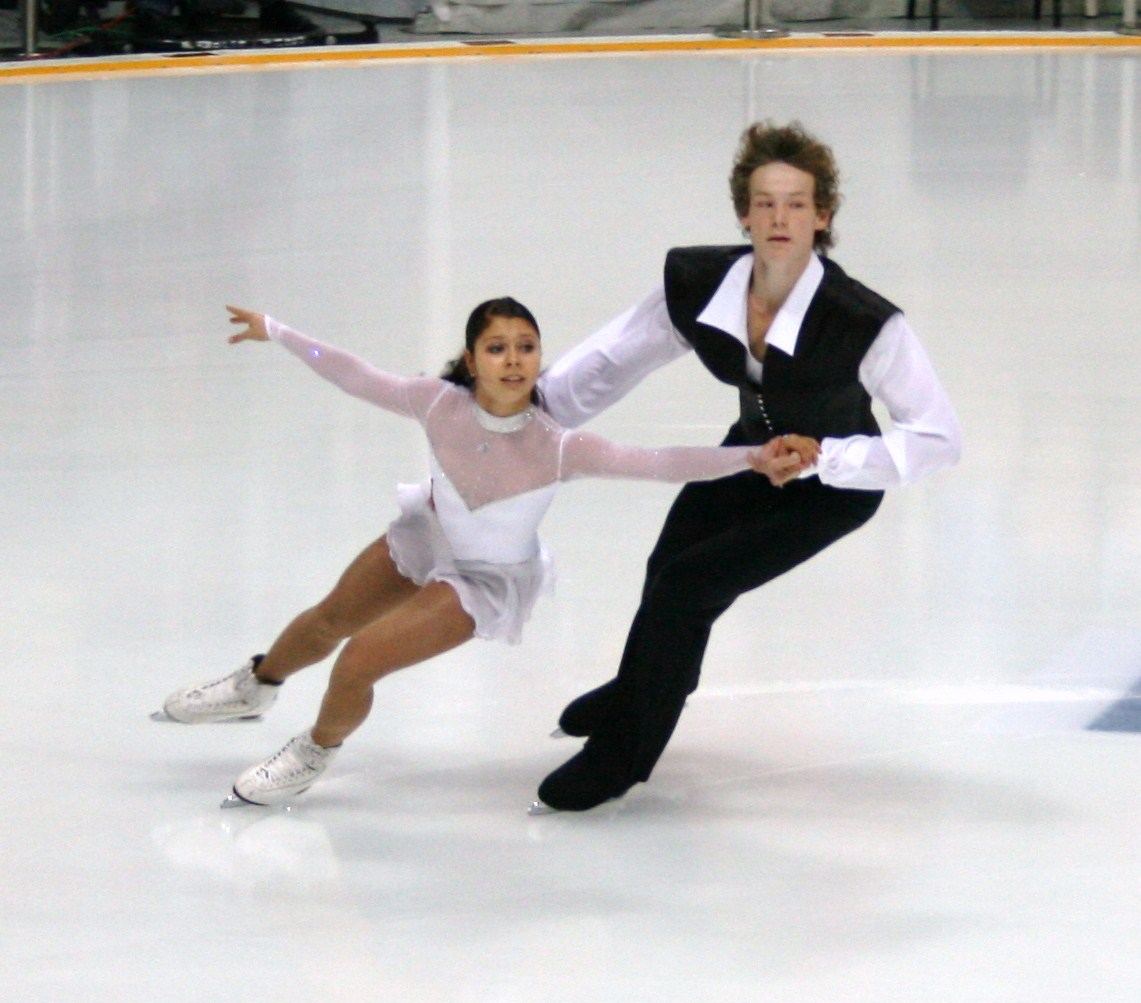
Danilova/Novoselov in 2009

Novoselov teamed up with Tatiana Danilova later in 2009. The pair was coached by Inna Utkina in Moscow. They placed 8th at the 2010 Russian Junior Championships and appeared on the ISU Junior Grand Prix series the following season, placing fourth in Austria and sixth in Germany. Competing at senior level, they won the silver medal at the 2010 Golden Spin of Zagreb.

Danilova was unable to skate for a year following a shoulder operation so she told Novoselov that he could look for another partner.

=== Partnership with Novik ===
In 2011, Novoselov began skating with Tatiana Novik. They placed fourth at the 2011 Ice Challenge and eighth at the 2012 Russian Championships before winning the 2012 Toruń Cup. The pair entered the 2013 Nebelhorn Trophy, intending to represent Romania, but did not compete at the event.

Novoselov also considered skating for Bulgaria and Kazakhstan.

=== Partnership with Stolbova ===
On 16 September 2018 it was announced that Novoselov would compete in pairs with Ksenia Stolbova, who won gold and silver medals at the 2014 Sochi Winter Olympics.

== Career for France ==
By July 2014, Novoselov had teamed up with Daria Popova to represent France. They planned to divide their training between Moscow, coached by Inna Utkina, and Paris.

Russia released him to compete for France in exchange for French ice dancer Tiffany Zahorski. On 31 July 2015, however, it was announced that Popova had decided to retire from competitive figure skating.

=== Partnership with Esbrat ===
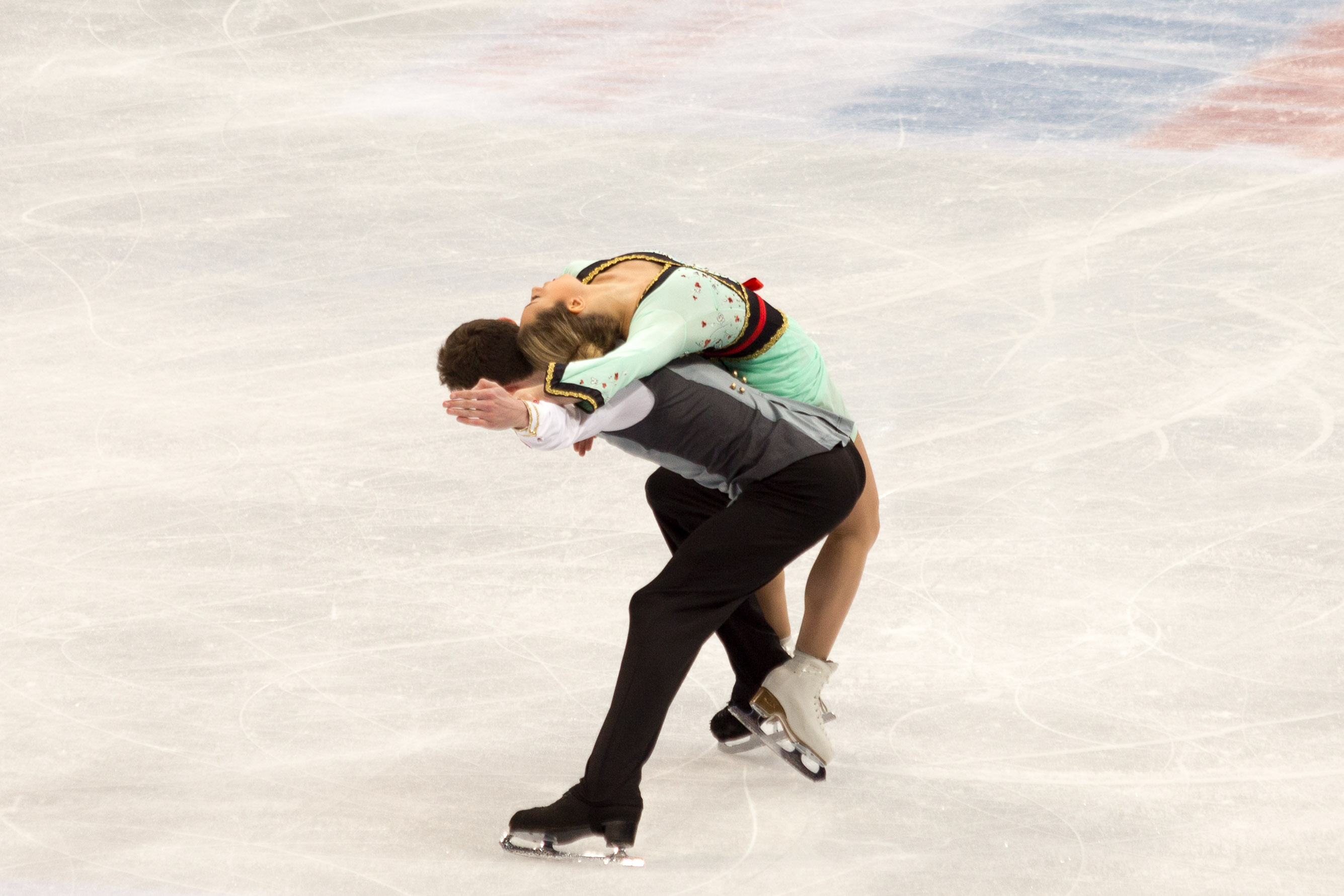
Esbrat and Novoselov at the 2017 Worlds

Novoselov teamed up with France's Lola Esbrat in mid-2015. They are coached by Claude Thevenard in Paris and compete for France. In 2016, the pair won bronze medals at the Toruń Cup and Bavarian Open. In early April, they competed at the 2016 World Championships in Boston; they qualified to the free skate and finished 16th overall.

In the 2016–17 season, Esbrat/Novoselov won the silver medal at the NRW Trophy and placed 5th at the Toruń Cup. In January 2017, they placed 11th in the short program, 13th in the free skate, and 13th overall at the 2017 European Championships in Ostrava, Czech Republic.

On 27 July 2018 it was announced that Esbrat and Novoselov had split.

== Programs ==
=== With Stolbova ===
Season	Short program	Free skating	Exhibition
2019–20	Rebirth by Hi-Finesse & Natacha Atlas; I'll Take Care of You by Beth Hart & Joe Bonamassa	Moonlight Sonata (Epic Trailer Version) by Ludwig van Beethoven performed by Hidden Citizens	

=== With Esbrat ===
Season	Short program	Free skating
2017–2018	Nocturne (from Lady Caliph) by Ennio Morricone performed by Yo-Yo Ma	The Great Gatsby; Back to Black by Amy Winehouse, Mark Ronson; Catgroove by Parov Stelar; Hotel Sayre by Craig Armstrong; Young and Beautiful by Lana Del Rey; Crazy in Love
2016–2017	Memoirs of a Geisha by John Williams	The Great Gatsby; Back to Black performed by Beyoncé; Cat Groove by Parov Stelar; Young and Beautiful by Lana Del Rey; Crazy in Love performed by Emeli Sandé
2015–2016	Fallin' by Alicia Keys	Maleficent by James Newton Howard; Once Upon a Dream performed by Lana Del Rey; Maleficent by James Newton Howard

=== With Danilova ===
Season	Short program	Free skating
2010–2011	Concerto for Violin by Saint-Preux	El Dia Que Me Quieras by Raul di Blasio

=== With Imaikina ===
Season	Short program	Free skating
2008–2009	The Dolphin and the Mermaid by Igor Nikolaev	Mask of Zorro by James Horner

== Competitive highlights ==
GP: Grand Prix; CS: Challenger Series; JGP: Junior Grand Prix

=== With Stolbova for Russia ===
International
Event	19–20
GP Rostelecom	5th
National
Russian Champ.	WD

=== With Esbrat for France ===
International
Event	2015–16	2016–17	2017–18	2018–19
World Champ.	16th	27th	25th	
European Champ.		13th	10th	
GP France		WD	7th	WD
CS Tallinn Trophy			4th	
Bavarian Open	3rd			
Cup of Nice			5th	
Cup of Tyrol	4th			
NRW Trophy		2nd		
Toruń Cup	3rd	5th		
National
French Champ.		2nd	1st	
Master's			2nd	
TBD = Assigned; WD = Withdrew

=== With Popova for France ===
International
Event	2014–15
International Challenge Cup	6th
National
French Championships	2nd

=== With Novik for Russia ===
International
Event	2011–12	2012–13	2013–14
Ice Challenge	4th		
Nebelhorn Trophy			WD
Toruń Cup	1st		
National
Russian Championships	8th		
WD = Withdrew

=== With Danilova for Russia ===
International
Event	2009–10	2010–11
Golden Spin of Zagreb		2nd
JGP Austria		4th
JGP Germany		6th
National
Russian Junior Championships	8th	

=== With Imaikina for Russia ===
International
Event	2007–08	2008–09
JGP Final		5th
JGP Czech Republic		2nd
JGP United Kingdom		2nd
JGP United States	7th	
National
Russian Championships		5th
Russian Junior Championships	8th	3rd
