= 2013 Russian Figure Skating Championships =

- Type: National championship
- Date: 24–28 December 2012 (S); 1–3 February 2013 (J)
- Season: 2012–13
- Location: Sochi (S) / Saransk (J)
- Host: Figure Skating Federation of Russia

Champions
- Men's singles: Evgeni Plushenko (S); Mikhail Kolyada (J)
- Ladies' singles: Elizaveta Tuktamysheva (S); Elena Radionova (J)
- Pairs: Tatiana Volosozhar / Maxim Trankov (S); Lina Fedorova / Maxim Miroshkin (J)
- Ice dance: Ekaterina Bobrova / Dmitri Soloviev (S); Valeria Zenkova / Valerie Sinitsin (J)
- Previous: 2012 Russian Championships
- Next: 2014 Russian Championships

The 2013 Russian Figure Skating Championships (Russian: Чемпионат России по фигурному катанию на коньках 2013) was held from 25 to 28 December 2012 in Sochi. Medals were awarded in the disciplines of men's singles, ladies' singles, pair skating, and ice dancing. The results are among the criteria used to select Russia's teams sent to the 2013 World Championships and 2013 European Championships.

== Competitions ==
Date	Event	Type	Location
24–28 December 2012	2013 Russian Championships	Final	Sochi, Krasnodar Krai
31 January – 3 February 2013	2013 Russian Junior Championships	Final	Saransk, Mordovia
16–19 February 2013	2013 Russian Cup Final	Final	Tver, Tver Oblast
19–23 March 2013	2013 Russian Youth Championships – Younger Age	Final	Stary Oskol, Belgorod Oblast
1–4 April 2013	2013 Russian Youth Championships – Elder Age	Final	Nizhny Novgorod, Nizhny Novgorod Oblast

== Medalists of most important competitions ==
Senior Championships
Discipline	Gold	Silver	Bronze
Men	Evgeni Plushenko	Sergei Voronov	Konstantin Menshov
Ladies	Elizaveta Tuktamysheva	Elena Radionova	Adelina Sotnikova
Pairs	Tatiana Volosozhar / Maxim Trankov	Yuko Kavaguti / Alexander Smirnov	Ksenia Stolbova / Fedor Klimov
Ice dancing	Ekaterina Bobrova / Dmitri Soloviev	Elena Ilinykh / Nikita Katsalapov	Ekaterina Riazanova / Ilia Tkachenko
Junior Championships
Discipline	Gold	Silver	Bronze
Men	Mikhail Kolyada	Alexander Samarin	Alexander Petrov
Ladies	Elena Radionova	Serafima Sakhanovich	Maria Sotskova
Pairs	Lina Fedorova / Maxim Miroshkin	Evgenia Tarasova / Vladimir Morozov	Kamilla Gainetdinova / Ivan Bich
Ice dancing	Valeria Zenkova / Valerie Sinitsin	Evgenia Kosigina / Nikolai Moroshkin	Anna Yanovskaya / Sergey Mozgov
Cup Final
Discipline	Gold	Silver	Bronze
Men	Konstantin Menshov	Sergei Voronov	Vladislav Sezganov
Ladies	Alena Leonova	Polina Agafonova	Nikol Gosviani
Pairs	Ksenia Stolbova / Fedor Klimov	Kristina Astakhova / Maxim Kurdyukov	Natalia Mitina / Yuri Shevchuk
Ice dancing	Ksenia Monko / Kirill Khaliavin	Victoria Sinitsina / Ruslan Zhiganshin	Valeria Loseva / Denis Lunin
Junior men	Alexei Genya	Murad Kurbanov	Moris Kvitelashvili
Junior ladies	Serafima Sakhanovich	Julia Li	Ulyana Titushkina
Junior pairs	Maria Vigalova / Egor Zakroev	Anastasia A. Gubanova / Alexei Sintsov	Oksana Nagalaty / Maxim Bobrov
Junior ice dancing	Anna Yanovskaya / Sergey Mozgov	Kristina Baklanova / Andrei Bagin	Betina Popova / Yuri Vlasenko
Youth Championships – Elder Age
Discipline	Gold	Silver	Bronze
Men	Vladislav Tarasenko	Adian Pitkeev	Andrei Lazukin
Ladies	Evgenia Medvedeva	Maria Sotskova	Natalia Ogoreltseva
Pairs	Oksana Nagalaty / Maxim Bobrov	Anastasia Poluianova / Stepan Korotkov	Maria Chuzhanova / Denis Mintsev
Ice dancing	Sofia Evdokimova / Egor Bazin	Betina Popova / Yuri Vlasenko	Anastasia Shpilevaya / Grigory Smirnov
Youth Championships – Younger Age
Discipline	Gold	Silver	Bronze
Men	Alexei Krasnozhon	Stanislav Andryunin	Daniil Bernadiner
Ladies	Alexandra Proklova	Natalia Ogoreltseva	Anastasia Kolomiets
Pairs	No pairs' discipline		
Ice dancing	No Ice dancing discipline		

== Senior Championships ==
The list of entries was announced on 13 December 2012. Yulia Lipnitskaya, Polina Shelepen, and Uliana Titushkina withdrew from the ladies' event to recover from injuries and were replaced by the three reserves, Tatiana Fedoseeva, Julia Li, and Nikol Gosviani. Vera Bazarova / Yuri Larionov withdrew from the pairs' event. Aleksandr Gorshkov said that Larionov had boot problems and could not endanger his partner. They were replaced by Anastasia A. Gubanova / Alexei Sintsov. Artem Borodulin withdrew from the men's event and was replaced by Adian Pitkeev. Kristina Gorshkova / Vitali Butikov withdrew from the ice dancing event but were not replaced due to a lack of reserves. Officials decided to test a new security system involving a background check at the event. A couple of minor earthquakes occurred in Sochi but not during any skating. One occurred before the event. Another quake occurred at 2:30 am on 26 December – its epicenter was more than 150 kilometers (93 miles) away in the Black Sea.

Evgeni Plushenko took the lead in the men's short program, with Sergei Voronov and Maxim Kovtun in second and third respectively. Plushenko also placed first in the free skating and took his 10th national title, while Voronov took silver and Konstantin Menshov the bronze.

Ekaterina Bobrova / Dmitri Soloviev were first in the short dance, followed by Elena Ilinykh / Nikita Katsalapov and Ksenia Monko / Kirill Khaliavin. Bobrova / Soloviev also placed first in the free dance and won their third national title, while Ilinykh / Katsalapov repeated as silver medalists and Ekaterina Riazanova / Ilia Tkachenko as bronze medalists.

Elizaveta Tuktamysheva took the lead in the ladies' short program ahead of three-time champion Adelina Sotnikova and Elena Radionova. Tuktamysheva fell ill before the free skating and her coach Alexei Mishin initially indicated that she would withdraw, but later she and her team decided she would compete. Tuktamysheva said, "I might find myself in an even worse situation in the future. I have to know how to handle it, so we decided to skate." She won her first national title, while Radionova won silver in her second appearance at the event and Sotnikova took the bronze.

Tatiana Volosozhar / Maxim Trankov placed first in the pairs' short program, ahead of Yuko Kavaguti / Alexander Smirnov and Ksenia Stolbova / Fedor Klimov. Volosozhar / Trankov won their second national title, Kavaguti / Smirnov won silver, and Stolbova / Klimov the bronze.

Russia's team for the 2013 European Championships was announced on 28 December:

- Men: Plushenko, Voronov, Kovtun
- Ladies: Tuktamysheva, Sotnikova, Gosviani
- Pairs: Volosozhar / Trankov, Kavaguti / Smirnov, Bazarova / Larionov
- Ice dancing: Bobrova / Soloviev, Ilinykh / Katsalapov, Riazanova / Tkachenko

The president of the Russian skating federation, Aleksandr Gorshkov, said the results of the European Championships and Russian Cup Final would be considered in selecting the team to the 2013 World Championships.

=== Schedule ===
- Tuesday, December 25
  - 14:00–14:30 – Opening ceremony
  - 14:45–16:15 – Short dance
  - 16:30–18:30 – Pairs' short
  - 18:45–21:15 – Men's short
- Wednesday, December 26
  - 14:00–16:30 – Ladies' short
  - 16:45–19:45 – Men's free
  - 20:00–22:00 – Free dance
- Thursday, December 27
  - 16:00–18:25 – Pairs' free
  - 18:40–21:30 – Ladies' free
- Friday, December 28
  - 14:00–14:30 – Medal ceremonies
  - 14:45–17:15 – Exhibitions

=== Results ===
==== Men ====
Rank	Name	Region	Total points	SP		FS	
1	Evgeni Plushenko	SPB	265.94	1	91.68	1	174.26
2	Sergei Voronov	MSK	254.06	2	87.69	2	166.37
3	Konstantin Menshov	SBP	228.88	6	73.88	3	155.00
4	Artur Gachinski	SPB	227.46	4	74.58	4	152.88
5	Maxim Kovtun	MSK	225.02	3	75.38	5	149.64
6	Vladislav Sezganov	SPB	209.78	9	65.81	6	143.97
7	Mikhail Kolyada	SPB	208.96	5	74.46	9	134.50
8	Alexander Samarin	MSK	205.35	10	65.34	7	140.01
9	Artur Dmitriev Jr.	MSK	204.24	7	73.78	11	130.46
10	Alexander Petrov	SPB	203.57	8	67.83	8	135.74
11	Mark Shakhmatov	MSK	192.30	12	61.36	10	130.94
12	Zhan Bush	SPB	190.15	11	62.60	12	127.55
13	Andrei Lazukin	SPB	184.54	16	60.51	13	124.13
14	Alexei Genya	MOB	182.89	14	60.66	14	122.23
15	Adian Pitkeev	MSK	179.54	15	60.65	15	118.89
16	Artem Lezheez	SPB	174.86	17	59.63	16	115.23
17	Feodosiy Efremenkov	MSK	173.04	18	59.01	17	114.03
18	Vladislav Smirnov	SPB	161.05	13	60.95	18	100.10

==== Ladies ====
Rank	Name	Region	Total points	SP		FS	
1	Elizaveta Tuktamysheva	SPB	196.57	1	69.50	1	127.07
2	Elena Radionova	MSK	191.26	3	64.58	2	126.68
3	Adelina Sotnikova	MSK	190.75	2	66.99	3	123.76
4	Serafima Sakhanovich	SPB	177.37	9	56.50	4	120.87
5	Anna Pogorilaya	MSK	176.58	5	60.45	5	116.13
6	Nikol Gosviani	SPB	170.67	8	57.77	6	112.90
7	Alena Leonova	MSK	169.64	6	59.64	8	110.00
8	Ksenia Makarova	SPB	163.83	12	53.36	7	110.47
9	Alsu Kayumova	MSK	163.51	10	53.89	9	109.62
10	Polina Korobeynikova	MSK	163.04	4	60.85	11	102.19
11	Maria Stavitskaia	SPB	161.49	11	53.40	10	108.09
12	Evgenia Gerasimova	SPB	156.05	7	59.57	14	96.48
13	Natalia Ogoreltseva	SPI	150.88	14	51.16	12	99.72
14	Elizaveta Yushenko	MSK	149.77	13	51.40	13	98.37
15	Julia Li	MSK	142.43	16	47.56	15	94.87
16	Alina Maximova	MSK	138.02	15	50.66	17	87.36
17	Sofia Biryukova	MSK	135.69	17	46.98	16	88.71
18	Tatiana Fedoseeva	MSK	129.41	18	44.71	18	84.70

==== Pairs ====
Rank	Name	Region	Total points	SP		FS	
1	Tatiana Volosozhar / Maxim Trankov	MSK	228.92	1	78.69	1	150.23
2	Yuko Kavaguti / Alexander Smirnov	SPB	207.37	2	70.19	2	137.18
3	Ksenia Stolbova / Fedor Klimov	SPB	195.46	3	67.78	3	127.68
4	Julia Antipova / Nodari Maisuradze	MSK	178.80	6	56.96	4	121.84
5	Evgenia Tarasova / Vladimir Morozov	MSK	164.29	8	52.93	5	111.36
6	Anastasia Martiusheva / Alexei Rogonov	MSK	161.88	5	57.65	8	104.23
7	Vasilisa Davankova / Andrei Deputat	MSK	161.76	4	58.30	9	103.46
8	Lina Fedorova / Maxim Miroshkin	MSK	160.03	7	54.30	6	105.73
9	Maria Vigalova / Egor Zakroev	PRM	154.38	10	51.92	10	102.46
10	Kristina Astakhova / Maxim Kurdyukov	MSK	153.78	11	49.00	7	104.78
11	Ekaterina Petaikina / Konstantin Bezmaternikh	MSK	145.42	9	52.91	11	92.51
12	Anastasia A. Gubanova / Alexei Sintsov	PRM	116.79	12	36.26	12	80.53

==== Ice dancing ====
Rank	Name	Region	Total points	SD		FD	
1	Ekaterina Bobrova / Dmitri Soloviev	MSK	174.72	1	68.05	1	106.76
2	Elena Ilinykh / Nikita Katsalapov	MSK	171.67	2	66.14	2	105.53
3	Ekaterina Riazanova / Ilia Tkachenko	MOB	163.87	5	59.88	3	103.99
4	Ksenia Monko / Kirill Khaliavin	MSK	155.63	3	61.90	5	93.73
5	Victoria Sinitsina / Ruslan Zhiganshin	MSK	153.97	4	60.03	4	93.94
6	Ekaterina Pushkash / Jonathan Guerreiro	MSK	143.11	6	57.19	6	85.92
7	Valeria Starygina / Ivan Volobuiev	MSK	126.99	7	48.32	7	78.67
8	Tatiana Baturintseva / Andrei Nevskiy	MOB	95.35	8	36.24	8	59.11
9	Daria Seminikhina / Jan Glazkov	SMR	88.06	9	31.15	9	56.91

== Junior Championships ==
The 2013 Russian Junior Championships were held from 31 January to 3 February 2013 in Saransk.

Mikhail Kolyada won the junior men's title while Alexander Samarin and Alexander Petrov won silver and bronze respectively.

JGP Final champion Elena Radionova won the junior ladies' event ahead of Serafima Sakhanovich and Maria Sotskova, both of whom were age-ineligible for junior internationals. 2012 World Junior champion Yulia Lipnitskaya finished 5th in her first competition since recovering from a concussion.

JGP Final champions Lina Fedorova / Maxim Miroshkin took the junior pairs' title, with silver going to Evgenia Tarasova / Vladimir Morozov, who had finished ahead of them at the senior Russian Championships. The winners attempted no side-by-side triples but the silver and bronze medalists successfully performed at least one set. Kamilla Gainetdinova / Ivan Bich landed a SBS triple lutz, double toe combination at the start of their program and SBS triple toes after the half-way mark. They beat the JGP Final bronze medalists, Maria Vigalova / Egor Zakroev, for the bronze. JGP Final silver medalists Vasilisa Davankova / Andrei Deputat withdrew due to Davankova's leg injury.

JGP Final champions Alexandra Stepanova / Ivan Bukin withdrew due to Bukin's sinusitis. They were automatically named in the Russian team to Junior Worlds. In their absence, Valeria Zenkova / Valerie Sinitsin won the junior ice dancing title ahead of Evgenia Kosigina / Nikolai Moroshkin and Anna Yanovskaia / Sergey Mozgov.

The team to the 2013 World Junior Championships was announced on 5 February 2013.

- Men: Kolyada, Samarin
- Ladies: Radionova, Lipnitskaia, Pogorilaya
- Pairs: Fedorova / Miroshkin, Tarasova / Morozov, Gainetdinova / Bich
- Ice dancing: Zenkova / Sinitsin, Kosigina / Moroshkin, Stepanova / Bukin

=== Results ===
==== Men ====
Rank	Name	Region	Total points	SP		FS	
1	Mikhail Kolyada	SPB	227.32	1	77.63	1	149.69
2	Alexander Samarin	Moscow	215.81	2	71.88	3	143.93
3	Alexander Petrov	SPB	211.92	7	66.55	2	145.37
4	Adian Pitkeev	Moscow	207.07	4	68.72	4	138.35
5	Artem Lezheev	SPB	201.17	8	66.53	5	134.64
6	Murad Kurbanov	Moscow	201.16	6	66.56	6	134.60
7	Vladislav Tarasenko	SPB	201.12	3	71.01	10	130.11
8	Andrei Lazukin	S/S	199.24	9	66.40	8	132.84
9	Alexei Genya	Moscow Oblast	197.69	11	63.24	7	134.45
10	Feodosiy Efremenkov	Moscow	193.92	10	63.33	9	130.59
11	Andrei Zuber	SPB	187.55	14	59.63	11	127.92
12	Alexei Krasnozhon	SPB	178.06	5	67.21	17	110.85
13	Roman Savosin	Moscow	176.81	12	62.70	13	114.11
14	Moris Kvitelashvili	Moscow	173.28	13	62.16	15	111.12
15	Vladislav Smirnov	SPB	173.05	17	55.00	12	118.05
16	Vladimir Samoliov	Moscow	172.46	15	58.52	14	113.94
17	Кonstantin Milyukov	Kazan	168.08	16	56.99	16	111.09

==== Ladies ====
Rank	Name	Region	Total points	SP		FS	
1	Elena Radionova	Moscow	200.19	1	68.45	1	131.74
2	Serafima Sakhanovich	SPB	191.55	2	67.49	2	124.06
3	Maria Sotskova	Moscow	181.12	7	58.83	3	122.29
4	Evgenia Medvedeva	Moscow	180.19	5	61.35	4	118.84
5	Yulia Lipnitskaya	Moscow	178.56	3	67.03	6	111.53
6	Anna Pogorilaya	Moscow	170.86	8	58.34	5	112.52
7	Valentina Chernyshova	SPB	165.49	4	62.17	8	103.32
8	Evgenia Gerasimova	SPB	161.79	6	58.84	9	102.95
9	Julia Li	Moscow	157.13	11	54.98	11	102.15
10	Maria Stavitskaia	SPB	157.02	15	52.46	7	104.56
11	Anastasia Kolomiets	SPB	156.86	12	54.80	12	102.06
12	Valeria Evseeva	MSK	155.94	14	53.54	10	102.40
13	Elizabet Tursynbayeva	Moscow	151.20	13	53.73	13	97.47
14	Alsu Kayumova	Moscow	149.56	10	55.07	15	94.49
15	Kristina Zaseeva	Moscow	149.33	9	57.98	16	91.35
16	Elizaveta Yushenko	Moscow	145.72	17	49.80	14	95.92
17	Arina Petrova	SPB	134.43	16	51.53	17	82.90
18	Polina Platkova	SAR	101.84	18	32.50	18	69.34

==== Pairs ====
Rank	Name	Region	Total points	SP		FS	
1	Lina Fedorova / Maxim Miroshkin	Moscow	176.17	2	57.51	1	118.66
2	Evgenia Tarasova / Vladimir Morozov	M/K	171.47	1	60.23	3	111.24
3	Kamilla Gainetdinova / Ivan Bich	SPB	170.69	4	53.21	2	117.48
4	Maria Vigalova / Egor Zakroev	Perm	167.88	3	56.91	4	110.97
5	Arina Cherniavskaia / Antonio Souza-Kordeyru	Moscow	136.58	7	44.49	5	92.09
6	Valeria Grechukhina / Andrei Filonov	Moscow	128.23	6	46.45	7	81.78
7	Anastasia A. Gubanova / Alexei Sintsov	Perm	127.88	9	41.35	6	86.53
8	Oksana Nagalaty / Maxim Bobrov	SPB	125.98	5	46.83	8	79.15
9	Alexandra Minina / Alexander Korovin	Saransk	114.47	11	35.57	9	78.90
10	Anastasia Dolidze / Vadim Ivanov	Moscow	103.90	10	41.10	11	62.80
11	Vlada Mishina / Alexander Kurmachev	Moscow	103.71	12	33.38	10	70.33
WD	Ekaterina Borisova / Sergei Lisiev	Saransk		8	43.54		

==== Ice dancing ====
Rank	Name	Region	Total points	SP		FS	
1	Valeria Zenkova / Valerie Sinitsin	Moscow	143.99	1	58.62	3	85.37
2	Evgenia Kosigina / Nikolai Moroshkin	Moscow Oblast	143.26	3	56.06	2	87.20
3	Anna Yanovskaya / Sergey Mozgov	Moscow	142.88	4	55.15	1	87.73
4	Daria Morozova / Mikhail Zhirnov	Moscow	135.13	2	56.19	4	78.94
5	Sofia Evdokimova / Egor Bazin	Tolyatti	130.78	6	53.17	5	77.61
6	Kristina Baklanova / Andrei Bagin	Moscow	129.35	5	54.05	7	75.30
7	Betina Popova / Yuri Vlasenko	Moscow	128.16	8	50.97	6	77.19
8	Maria Simonova / Dmitri Dragun	Tolyatti	124.73	7	52.25	9	72.48
9	Valeria Loseva / Denis Lunin	Moscow	121.28	9	46.86	8	74.42
10	Eva Khachaturian / Igor Eremenko	Moscow	108.92	11	42.47	10	66.45
11	Alla Loboda / Pavel Drozd	Moscow	107.26	12	41.22	11	66.04
12	Ekaterina Bocharova / Anton Shibnev	Moscow	105.40	10	42.97	14	62.43
13	Anastasia Voronkova / Nikita Trushkov	Moscow	104.89	13	40.62	12	64.27
14	Elizaveta Tretyakova / Alexander Savin	Moscow	103.52	14	40.40	13	63.12
15	Daria Malaeva / Vladislav Ishin	Tolyatti	97.11	15	38.51	15	58.60
