= 2011 Russian Figure Skating Championships =

- Type: National Championship
- Date: 26–29 December 2010 (S); 2–4 February 2011 (J)
- Season: 2010–11
- Location: Saransk (S) / Kazan (J)
- Host: Figure Skating Federation of Russia
- Venue: Ice Palace (S) / Sport Palace (J)

Champions
- Men's singles: Konstantin Menshov (S); Artur Dmitriev Jr. (J)
- Ladies' singles: Adelina Sotnikova (S); Elizaveta Tuktamysheva (J)
- Pairs: Tatiana Volosozhar / Maxim Trankov (S); Ksenia Stolbova / Fedor Klimov (J)
- Ice dance: Ekaterina Bobrova / Dmitri Soloviev (S); Ksenia Monko / Kirill Khaliavin (J)
- Previous: 2010 Russian Championships
- Next: 2012 Russian Championships

The 2011 Russian Figure Skating Championships (Russian: Чемпионат России по фигурному катанию на коньках 2011) was held on 26–29 December 2010 in Saransk. The junior competition was held on 2–4 February 2011 in Kazan. Skaters competed in the disciplines of men's singles, ladies' singles, pair skating, and ice dancing.

The results could be used to help determine the teams for the 2011 World Championships and the 2011 European Championships.

== Competitions ==
Date	Event	Type	Location
25–29 December 2010	2011 Russian Championships	Final	Saransk, Mordovia
1–4 February 2011	2011 Russian Junior Championships	Final	Kazan, Republic of Tatarstan
23–26 February 2011	2011 Russian Cup Final	Final	Yoshkar-Ola, Mari El
15–19 March 2011	2011 Russian Youth Championships – Younger Age	Final	Tver, Tver Oblast
29 March – 1 April 2011	2011 Russian Youth Championships – Elder Age	Final	Nizhny Novgorod, Nizhny Novgorod Oblast

== Medalists of most important competitions ==
Senior Championships
Discipline	Gold	Silver	Bronze
Men	Konstantin Menshov	Artur Gachinski	Zhan Bush
Ladies	Adelina Sotnikova	Alena Leonova	Elizaveta Tuktamysheva
Pairs	Tatiana Volosozhar / Maxim Trankov	Yuko Kavaguti / Alexander Smirnov	Vera Bazarova / Yuri Larionov
Ice dancing	Ekaterina Bobrova / Dmitri Soloviev	Ekaterina Riazanova / Ilia Tkachenko	Elena Ilinykh / Nikita Katsalapov
Junior Championships
Discipline	Gold	Silver	Bronze
Men	Artur Dmitriev Jr.	Zhan Bush	Gordei Gorshkov
Ladies	Elizaveta Tuktamysheva	Polina Shelepen	Rosa Sheveleva
Pairs	Ksenia Stolbova / Fedor Klimov	Alexandra Vasilieva / Yuri Shevchuk	Kristina Astakhova / Nikita Bochkov
Ice dancing	Ksenia Monko / Kirill Khaliavin	Ekaterina Pushkash / Jonathan Guerreiro	Evgenia Kosigina / Nikolai Moroshkin
Cup Final
Discipline	Gold	Silver	Bronze
Men	Konstantin Menshov	Sergei Voronov	Mark Shakhmatov
Ladies	Rosa Sheveleva	Ksenia Makarova	Yulia Lipnitskaya
Pairs	Katarina Gerboldt / Alexander Enbert	Anastasia Martiusheva / Alexei Rogonov	Evgenia Tarasova / Egor Chudin
Ice dancing	Anastasia Kabanova / Nikolai Babin	Evgenia Surkova / Denis Kozlov	
Junior men	Feodosiy Efremenkov	Alexei Genya	Artemiy Punin
Junior ladies	Alsu Kayumova	Evgenia Medvedeva	Polina Korobeinikova
Junior pairs	Ekaterina Petaikina / Maxim Kurdiukov	Elizaveta Semenova / Maxim Petukhov	Tatiana Tudvaseva / Sergei Lisiev
Junior ice dancing	Valeria Zenkova / Valerie Sinitsin	Anna Yanovskaya / Egor Koshcheev	Tatiana Baturintseva / Sergey Mozgov
Youth Championships – Elder Age
Discipline	Gold	Silver	Bronze
Men	Feodosiy Efremenkov	Ilya Petrov	Murad Kurbanov
Ladies	Evgenia Gerasimova	Polina Korobeinikova	Ekaterina Frolova
Pairs	Lina Fedorova / Maxim Miroshkin	Maria Vygalova / Egor Zakroev	Ekaterina Sergeantova / Yaroslav Maslov
Ice dancing	Victoria Sinitsina / Ruslan Zhiganshin	Sofia Evdokimova / Egor Bazin	Anna Yanovskaya / Egor Koshcheev
Youth Championships – Younger Age
Discipline	Gold	Silver	Bronze
Men	Alexander Samarin	Andrei Zuber	Adyan Pitkeev
Ladies	Elena Radionova	Evgenia Medvedeva	Anna Shershak
Pairs	No pairs' discipline		
Ice dancing	No ice dancing discipline		

== Senior Championships ==
=== Schedule ===
(All times GMT+3)

- Sunday 26 December 2010
  - 14:00–14:30 Opening ceremony
  - 14:45–16:15 Ice dancing – Short dance
  - 16:30–18:30 Pairs – Short programs
  - 18:45–21:15 Men – Short skating
- Monday, December 27
  - 14:00–16:30 Ladies – Short programs
  - 16:45–19:05 Pairs – Free skating
  - 19:20–22:20 Men – Free skating
- Tuesday, December 28
  - 14:00–16:50 Ladies – Free skating
  - 17:05–19:05 Ice dancing – Free dance
- Wednesday, December 29
  - 16:00–16:30 Award ceremonies
  - 16:45–19:15 Exhibition skates

=== Results ===
==== Men ====
Rank	Name	City or region	Total points	SP		FS	
1	Konstantin Menshov	Saint Petersburg	225.17	1	78.42	1	146.75
2	Artur Gachinski	Saint Petersburg	211.28	9	64.75	2	146.53
3	Zhan Bush	Chelyabinsk	204.98	5	69.05	4	135.93
4	Sergei Voronov	Moscow	204.71	13	60.14	3	144.57
5	Ivan Tretiakov	Moscow	204.54	3	72.05	6	132.49
6	Gordei Gorshkov	Saint Petersburg	203.50	4	69.98	5	133.52
7	Artur Dmitriev Jr.	Saint Petersburg	202.72	2	77.65	9	125.07
8	Denis Leushin	Moscow	196.17	8	66.51	8	129.66
9	Ivan Bariev	Moscow	193.61	12	62.67	7	130.94
10	Vladislav Sezganov	Saint Petersburg	190.37	7	66.85	10	123.52
11	Maxim Kovtun	Ekaterinburg	188.50	6	67.63	12	120.87
12	Mark Shakhmatov	Moscow	185.02	11	63.84	11	121.18
13	Stanislav Samokhin	Moscow	184.36	10	64.58	13	119.78
14	Alexandr Nikolaev	Moscow	164.58	14	58.74	14	105.84
15	Konstantin Milyukov	Kazan	154.53	15	57.46	16	97.07
16	Feodosiy Efremenkov	Moscow	149.93	17	44.23	15	105.70
17	Nikita Mikhailov	Moscow	141.50	16	53.07	17	88.43

==== Ladies ====
Rank	Name	City or region	Total points	SP		FS	
1	Adelina Sotnikova	Moscow	197.44	2	63.79	1	133.65
2	Alena Leonova	Saint Petersburg	187.68	3	60.14	2	127.54
3	Elizaveta Tuktamysheva	Saint Petersburg	180.71	7	56.30	3	124.41
4	Yulia Lipnitskaya	Moscow	176.27	5	59.13	4	117.14
5	Ksenia Makarova	Saint Petersburg	173.91	1	64.16	6	109.75
6	Sofia Biryukova	Moscow	159.14	4	59.49	8	99.65
7	Polina Shelepen	Moscow	159.03	9	53.89	7	105.14
8	Rosa Sheveleva	Moscow Oblast	156.81	13	46.33	5	110.48
9	Polina Agafonova	Saint Petersburg	154.48	6	58.42	10	96.06
10	Polina Korobeinikova	Moscow	152.15	10	53.62	9	98.53
11	Alexandra Deeva	Moscow	144.07	11	51.23	11	92.84
12	Maria Artemieva	Saint Petersburg	139.35	8	54.63	13	84.72
13	Anna Novichkina	Moscow	126.90	14	45.84	14	81.06
14	Sofia Mishina	Moscow	124.22	16	39.13	12	85.09
15	Anna Afonkina	Moscow	122.24	12	46.89	15	75.35
16	Evgenia Pochufarova	Moscow Oblast	109.85	15	39.66	16	70.19

==== Pairs ====
Rank	Name	City or region	Total points	SP		FS	
1	Tatiana Volosozhar / Maxim Trankov	Moscow	214.66	1	72.71	1	141.95
2	Yuko Kavaguti / Alexander Smirnov	Saint Petersburg	201.44	2	68.15	2	133.29
3	Vera Bazarova / Yuri Larionov	Perm	195.77	3	67.83	3	127.94
4	Katarina Gerboldt / Alexander Enbert	Saint Petersburg	182.77	4	61.99	5	120.78
5	Lubov Iliushechkina / Nodari Maisuradze	Moscow	179.49	6	58.68	4	120.81
6	Ksenia Stolbova / Fedor Klimov	Saint Petersburg	168.08	5	61.03	6	107.05
7	Maria Mukhortova / Jérôme Blanchard	Saint Petersburg	148.63	7	53.78	8	94.85
8	Ekaterina Petaikina / Maxim Kurdiukov	Moscow	145.74	8	51.34	9	94.40
9	Anastasia Martiusheva / Alexei Rogonov	Moscow	143.49	9	47.38	7	96.11
10	Sabina Imaikina / Konstantin Bezmaternikh	Saint Petersburg	139.20	10	47.33	10	91.87
11	Ksenia Ozerova / Denis Golubev	Saint Petersburg	98.75	11	39.22	11	59.53

==== Ice dancing ====
Rank	Name	City or region	Total points	SD		FD	
1	Ekaterina Bobrova / Dmitri Soloviev	Moscow	164.93	1	65.34	1	99.59
2	Ekaterina Riazanova / Ilia Tkachenko	Moscow Oblast	160.45	3	62.17	2	98.28
3	Elena Ilinykh / Nikita Katsalapov	Moscow	149.72	2	62.30	4	87.42
4	Jana Khokhlova / Fedor Andreev	Moscow	145.74	5	53.74	3	92.00
5	Kristina Gorshkova / Vitali Butikov	Moscow	142.83	4	57.30	5	85.53
6	Angelina Telegina / Valentin Molotov	Mordovia	123.83	6	47.06	6	76.77
7	Valeria Starygina / Ivan Volobuyev	Moscow	113.57	7	43.32	7	70.25
8	Anastasia Kabanova / Nikolai Babin	Moscow Oblast	99.52	8	35.60	8	63.92
9	Evgenia Shakhtarina / Denis Kozlov	Kirov	77.83	9	28.95	9	48.88

== Junior Championships ==
The 2011 Russian Junior Figure Skating Championships were held in Kazan on 2–4 February 2011.

=== Schedule ===
(All times GMT+3)

- February 2
  - 14:00 Men – Short program
  - 17:30 Pairs – Short program
  - 19:45 Ice dancing – Short dance
- February 3
  - 12:00 Ladies – Short program

=== Results ===
==== Men ====
Rank	Name	City or region	Total points	SP		FS	
1	Artur Dmitriev Jr.	Saint Petersburg	206.85	1	72.30	2	134.55
2	Zhan Bush	Chelyabinsk	206.14	3	70.25	1	135.89
3	Gordei Gorshkov	Saint Petersburg	205.26	2	71.14	3	134.12
4	Mark Shakhmatov	Moscow	192.41	5	62.95	4	129.46
5	Maxim Kovtun	Ekaterinburg	182.57	4	63.32	6	119.25
6	Konstantin Milyukov	Kazan	175.94	6	59.45	7	116.49
7	Mikhail Kolyada	Saint Petersburg	172.35	18	50.22	5	122.13
8	Ilya Petrov	Moscow	164.35	9	55.40	9	108.95
9	Vladislav Tarasenko	Saint Petersburg	163.93	7	56.05	10	107.88
10	Alexei Genya	Moscow	160.86	10	54.33	12	106.53
11	Murad Kurbanov	Moscow	159.40	15	52.36	11	107.04
12	Alexander Samarin	Moscow	157.83	20	48.57	8	109.26
13	Feodosiy Efremenkov	Moscow	157.42	13	52.64	13	104.78
14	Moris Kvitelashvili	Moscow	154.91	12	53.66	15	101.25
15	Sergei Alexeev	Moscow	154.81	14	52.44	14	102.37
16	Andrei Zuber	Saint Petersburg	149.28	11	54.00	18	95.28
17	Sergei Borodulin	Moscow	148.42	16	52.32	16	96.10
18	Adyan Pitkeev	Moscow	148.18	8	55.46	19	92.72
19	Artemiy Punin	Moscow	146.64	17	51.04	17	95.60
20	Artem Lezheev	Saint Petersburg	131.80	19	49.56	20	82.24

==== Ladies ====
Rank	Name	City or region	Total points	SP		FS	
1	Elizaveta Tuktamysheva	Saint Petersburg	193.56	1	60.96	1	132.60
2	Polina Shelepen	Moscow	174.33	2	60.31	3	114.02
3	Rosa Sheveleva	Moscow Oblast	173.58	3	57.30	2	116.28
4	Elena Radionova	Moscow	158.97	5	54.75	4	104.22
5	Natalia Ogoreltseva		154.71	6	53.31	5	101.40
6	Sofia Biryukova	Moscow	153.77	4	56.99	6	96.78
7	Polina Agafonova	Saint Petersburg	145.61	8	50.99	7	94.62
8	Kristina Zaseeva	Moscow	139.38	9	48.21	11	91.17
9	Daria Medvedeva	Saint Petersburg	139.00	12	45.68	8	93.32
10	Ekaterina Frolova	Moscow	137.30	11	45.76	10	91.54
11	Polina Korobeinikova	Moscow	132.26	17	40.29	9	91.97
12	Evgenia Medvedeva	Moscow	131.50	13	42.57	12	88.93
13	Valentina Chernysheva	Saint Petersburg	125.25	16	40.42	13	84.83
14	Arina Petrova	Saint Petersburg	124.95	14	41.79	14	83.16
15	Anna Pogorilaya	Moscow	121.96	15	41.26	15	80.70
16	Alexandra Deeva	Moscow	117.42	18	37.21	16	80.21
17	Daria Afanasieva		117.30	10	47.77	17	69.53
WD	Yulia Lipnitskaya	Moscow		7	51.75		

==== Pairs ====
Rank	Name	City or region	Total points	SP		FS	
1	Ksenia Stolbova / Fedor Klimov	Saint Petersburg	177.96	1	62.63	1	115.33
2	Alexandra Vasilieva / Yuri Shevchuk	Saint Petersburg	149.26	2	51.54	2	97.72
3	Kristina Astakhova / Nikita Bochkov	Moscow	143.84	3	51.05	5	92.79
4	Ekaterina Petaikina / Maxim Kurdiukov	Moscow	142.21	5	46.67	3	95.54
5	Anna Silaeva / Artur Minchuk	Saint Petersburg	142.08	4	49.21	4	92.87
6	Tatiana Tudvaseva / Sergei Lisiev	Perm	128.05	7	43.41	6	84.64
7	Valeria Grechukhina / Andrei Filonov	Moscow	125.98	6	44.67	8	81.31
8	Elizaveta Semenova / Maxim Petukhov	Perm	124.18	9	40.53	7	83.65
9	Anastasia Dolidze / Igor Chudin	Moscow	120.19	8	40.81	9	79.38
10	Yana Volkova / Alexei Petryanin	Perm	107.67	10	38.42	11	69.25
11	Lina Fedorova / Maxim Miroshkin	Moscow	106.48	11	36.94	10	69.54

==== Ice dancing ====
Rank	Name	City or region	Total points	SD		FD	
1	Ksenia Monko / Kirill Khaliavin	Moscow	158.64	1	65.33	1	93.31
2	Ekaterina Pushkash / Jonathan Guerreiro	Moscow	147.09	3	58.13	2	88.96
3	Evgenia Kosigina / Nikolai Moroshkin	Moscow Oblast	142.81	2	59.43	3	83.38
4	Alexandra Stepanova / Ivan Bukin	Moscow	139.57	4	57.69	5	81.88
5	Valeria Zenkova / Valerie Sinitsin	Moscow	138.73	5	56.17	4	82.56
6	Valeria Loseva / Denis Lunin	Moscow	123.69	6	50.02	6	73.67
7	Anna Yanovskaya / Egor Koshcheev	Moscow	118.17	8	46.93	7	71.24
8	Maria Simonova / Dmitri Dragun	Tolyatti	116.86	9	46.72	8	70.14
9	Tatiana Baturintseva / Sergey Mozgov	Moscow	113.99	7	48.55	11	65.44
10	Daria Morozova / Mikhail Zhirnov	Moscow	111.27	10	48.55	9	68.61
11	Sofia Evdokimova / Egor Bazin	Tolyatti	105.46	12	37.83	10	67.63
12	Elizaveta Tretiakova / Alexandr Savin	Moscow	100.55	11	40.14	13	60.41
13	Kristina Baklanova / Andrei Bagin	Moscow	99.17	14	35.31	12	63.86
14	Betina Popova / Yuri Vlasenko	Moscow	95.24	13	36.61	14	58.63

== International team selections ==
=== European Championships ===
The team to the 2011 European Championships was announced as follows:

	Men	Ladies	Pairs	Ice dancing
1	Konstantin Menshov	Alena Leonova	Yuko Kavaguti / Alexander Smirnov	Ekaterina Bobrova / Dmitri Soloviev
2	Artur Gachinski	Ksenia Makarova	Vera Bazarova / Yuri Larionov	Ekaterina Riazanova / Ilia Tkachenko
3			Katarina Gerboldt / Alexander Enbert	Elena Ilinykh / Nikita Katsalapov
1st alternate	Sergei Voronov	Sofia Biryukova	Lubov Iliushechkina / Nodari Maisuradze	Jana Khokhlova / Fedor Andreev
2nd alternate	Zhan Bush		Ksenia Stolbova / Fedor Klimov	Kristina Gorshkova / Vitali Butikov

- At the previous European Championships, Russia earned three spots each in pair skating and ice dancing and two spots each in the singles events.
- Tatiana Volosozhar and Maxim Trankov were ineligible due to a nationality change.
- Adelina Sotnikova and Elizaveta Tuktamysheva were ineligible due to age.

=== Winter Universiade ===
The team for the 2011 Winter Universiade was announced as follows:

	Men	Ladies	Pairs	Ice dancing
1	Sergei Voronov	Maria Artemieva	Lubov Iliushechkina / Nodari Maisuradze	Kristina Gorshkova / Vitali Butikov
2	Ivan Bariev	Ekaterina Kozyreva	Sabina Imaikina / Konstantin Bezmaternikh	Angelina Telegina / Valentin Molotov
3	Denis Leushin		Ksenia Ozerova / Denis Golubev	

=== World Championships ===
The team to the 2011 World Championships was announced following the results of the European Championships.

	Men	Ladies	Pairs	Ice dancing
1	Artur Gachinski	Alena Leonova	Tatiana Volosozhar / Maxim Trankov	Ekaterina Bobrova / Dmitri Soloviev
2		Ksenia Makarova	Yuko Kavaguti / Alexander Smirnov	Elena Ilinykh / Nikita Katsalapov
3			Vera Bazarova / Yuri Larionov	
1st alternate	Konstantin Menshov			Ekaterina Riazanova / Ilia Tkachenko
2nd alternate				Jana Khokhlova / Fedor Andreev

- At the previous World Championships, Russia earned three berths in pair skating, two in ladies and ice dance, and one in men's skating.
- Tatiana Volosozhar and Maxim Trankov become eligible after completing their one-year disqualification period due to a nationality change.
- Adelina Sotnikova and Elizaveta Tuktamysheva remain ineligible due to age.

=== World Junior Championships ===
The team to the 2011 World Junior Championships was announced as follows:

	Men	Ladies	Pairs	Ice dancing
1	Artur Dmitriev Jr.	Adelina Sotnikova	Ksenia Stolbova / Fedor Klimov	Ksenia Monko / Kirill Khaliavin
2	Zhan Bush	Elizaveta Tuktamysheva	Alexandra Vasilieva / Yuri Shevchuk	Ekaterina Pushkash / Jonathan Guerreiro
3	Gordei Gorshkov	Polina Shelepen	Kristina Astakhova / Nikita Bochkov	Evgenia Kosigina / Nikolai Moroshkin
