= 2009–10 Grand Prix of Figure Skating Final =

2009–10 Grand Prix Final
- Type: Grand Prix
- Date: December 2 – 6, 2009
- Season: 2009–10
- Location: Tokyo, Japan
- Venue: Yoyogi National Gymnasium

Champions
- Men's singles: (United States) Evan Lysacek (S) (Japan) Yuzuru Hanyu (J)
- Ladies' singles: (South Korea) Kim Yuna (S) (Japan) Kanako Murakami (J)
- Pairs: (China) Shen Xue / Zhao Hongbo (S) (China) Sui Wenjing / Han Cong (J)
- Ice dance: (United States) Meryl Davis / Charlie White (S) (Russia) Ksenia Monko / Kirill Khaliavin (J)
- Previous: 2008–09 Grand Prix Final
- Next: 2010–11 Grand Prix Final
- Previous Grand Prix: 2009 Skate Canada International

The 2009–10 Grand Prix of Figure Skating Final was a figure skating competition in the 2009–10 season. It was the culminating competition of the 2009–10 ISU Grand Prix of Figure Skating, a senior-level international invitational competition, and the 2009–10 ISU Junior Grand Prix, a junior-level international competition.

Skaters earned points towards qualifying for the senior Grand Prix Final at the 2009 Trophée Eric Bompard, the 2009 NHK Trophy, the 2009 Rostelecom Cup, the 2009 Cup of China, the 2009 Skate America, and the 2009 Skate Canada International. Skaters earned points towards qualifying for the Junior Grand Prix Final at each of the seven Junior Grand Prix events. The six highest ranking skaters/teams from the Grand Prix series and the eight highest ranking skaters/teams from the Junior Grand Prix met at the Grand Prix Final.

The event was held in Tokyo, Japan from December 2 to December 6, 2009. Medals were awarded in the disciplines of men's singles, ladies' singles, pair skating, and ice dancing on the senior and junior levels.

Unlike the other events in both series, there was no compulsory dance portion of the competition. Ice dancers were ranked in the original dance starting order in reverse order of their qualification to the Final.

== Schedule ==
All times are Japan Standard Time (UTC+9).

- Wednesday, December 2
  - 19:30 Opening ceremony
- Thursday, December 3
  - 17:00 Junior pairs – Short program
  - 18:30 Junior men – Short program
  - 20:00 Senior pairs – Short program
  - 21:15 Senior ice dancing – Original dance
- Friday, December 4
  - 15:00 Junior men – Free skating
  - 16:35 Junior pairs – Free skating
  - 18:30 Senior men – Short program
  - 19:40 Senior ladies – Short program
  - 20:50 Senior ice dancing – Free dance
- Saturday, December 5
  - 13:30 Junior ice dancing – Original dance
  - 14:55 Junior ladies – Short program
  - 16:25 Senior pairs – Free skating
  - 18:00 Senior men – Free skating
  - 19:30 Senior ladies – Free skating
- Sunday, December 6
  - 12:30 Junior ice dancing – Free dance
  - 14:00 Junior ladies – Free skating
  - 16:15 Exhibition gala

== Qualifiers ==
=== Senior-level qualifiers ===
The following skaters qualified for the Grand Prix Final, in order of qualification.

| | Men | Ladies | Pairs | Ice dancing |
|---|---|---|---|---|
| 1 | (Japan) Nobunari Oda | (South Korea) Kim Yuna | (China) Shen Xue / Zhao Hongbo | (United States) Meryl Davis / Charlie White |
| 2 | (United States) Evan Lysacek | (Japan) Miki Ando | (China) Pang Qing / Tong Jian | (Canada) Tessa Virtue / Scott Moir |
| 3 | (France) Brian Joubert (withdrew) | (Canada) Joannie Rochette | (Russia) Maria Mukhortova / Maxim Trankov | (United States) Tanith Belbin / Benjamin Agosto (withdrew) |
| 4 | (United States) Jeremy Abbott | (Russia) Alena Leonova | (Germany) Aliona Savchenko / Robin Szolkowy | (France) Nathalie Péchalat / Fabian Bourzat |
| 5 | (Japan) Daisuke Takahashi | (United States) Ashley Wagner | (Russia) Yuko Kavaguti / Alexander Smirnov | (Italy) Anna Cappellini / Luca Lanotte |
| 6 | (United States) Johnny Weir | (Japan) Akiko Suzuki | (China) Zhang Dan / Zhang Hao | (United Kingdom) Sinead Kerr / John Kerr |
Alternates
| 1st | (Czech Republic) Tomáš Verner (called up) | (United States) Rachael Flatt | (Canada) Jessica Dubé / Bryce Davison | (Russia) Jana Khokhlova / Sergei Novitski (withdrew) |
| 2nd | (Czech Republic) Michal Březina | (United States) Alissa Czisny | (Ukraine) Tatiana Volosozhar / Stanislav Morozov | (Canada) Vanessa Crone / Paul Poirier (called up) |
| 3rd | (Japan) Takahiko Kozuka | (Japan) Mao Asada | (United States) Keauna McLaughlin / Rockne Brubaker | (Israel) Alexandra Zaretski / Roman Zaretski |

- Tanith Belbin / Benjamin Agosto, the third qualifiers in the ice dancing event, withdrew due to illness (Belbin). They were replaced by second alternates Vanessa Crone / Paul Poirier after the first alternates, Jana Khokhlova / Sergei Novitski, withdrew due to illness (Novitski).
- Brian Joubert, the third qualifier in the men's event, withdrew due to injury. He was replaced by first alternate Tomáš Verner.

=== Junior-level qualifiers ===
The following skaters qualified for the Junior Grand Prix Final, in order of qualification.

| | Men | Ladies | Pairs | Ice dancing |
|---|---|---|---|---|
| 1 | (Japan) Yuzuru Hanyu | (Japan) Kanako Murakami | (China) Sui Wenjing / Han Cong | (United States) Maia Shibutani / Alex Shibutani |
| 2 | (United States) Ross Miner | (Russia) Polina Shelepen | (Japan) Narumi Takahashi / Mervin Tran | (Russia) Ksenia Monko / Kirill Khaliavin |
| 3 | (China) Song Nan | (United States) Kiri Baga | (Canada) Kaleigh Hole / Adam Johnson | (Russia) Elena Ilinykh / Nikita Katsalapov |
| 4 | (Russia) Artur Gachinski | (United States) Angela Maxwell | (China) Zhang Yue / Wang Lei | (Russia) Ekaterina Pushkash / Jonathan Guerreiro |
| 5 | (Japan) Kento Nakamura | (Russia) Ksenia Makarova | (Russia) Tatiana Novik / Mikhail Kuznetsov | (Canada) Kharis Ralph / Asher Hill |
| 6 | (Russia) Stanislav Kovalev | (United States) Christina Gao | (United States) Britney Simpson / Nathan Miller | (Italy) Lorenza Alessandrini / Simone Vaturi |
| 7 | (United States) Richard Dornbush | (Russia) Anna Ovcharova | (Russia) Alexandra Vasilieva / Yuri Shevchuk | (Russia) Marina Antipova / Artem Kudashev |
| 8 | (United States) Grant Hochstein | (United States) Ellie Kawamura | (Russia) Ksenia Stolbova / Fedor Klimov | (United States) Isabella Cannuscio / Ian Lorello |
Alternates
| 1st | (United States) Austin Kanallakan | (Japan) Yuki Nishino | (Canada) Brittany Jones / Kurtis Gaskell | (Canada) Karen Routhier / Eric Saucke-Lacelle |
| 2nd | (Russia) Gordei Gorshkov | (United States) Kristine Musademba | (Switzerland) Anaïs Morand / Antoine Dorsaz | (Ukraine) Alisa Agafonova / Dmitri Dun |
| 3rd | (Russia) Zhan Bush | (Canada) Kate Charbonneau | (Canada) Maddison Bird / Raymond Schultz | (Russia) Tatiana Baturintseva / Ivan Volobuiev |

== Medals table ==
| Rank | Nation | Gold | Silver | Bronze | Total |
|---|---|---|---|---|---|
| 1 | Japan (JPN) | 2 | 2 | 1 | 5 |
| 2 | United States (USA) | 2 | 0 | 1 | 3 |
| 3 | China (CHN) | 1 | 1 | 0 | 2 |
| 4 | South Korea (KOR) | 1 | 0 | 0 | 1 |
| 5 | Canada (CAN) | 0 | 1 | 0 | 1 |
| 6 | France (FRA) | 0 | 0 | 1 | 1 |
| 6 | Germany (GER) | 0 | 0 | 1 | 1 |
| Totals (7 entries) | | 6 | 4 | 4 | 14 |

== Senior-level results ==
=== Men ===
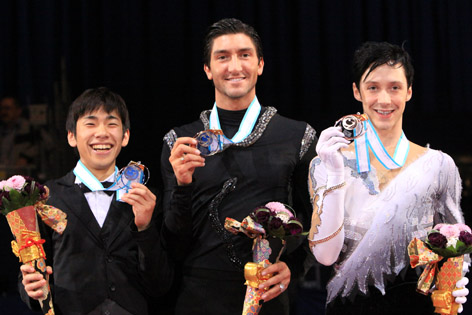
The men's podium for the 2009–10 Grand Prix Final.

| Rank | Name | Nation | Total points | SP | | FS | |
|---|---|---|---|---|---|---|---|
| 1 | Evan Lysacek | United States | 249.45 | 2 | 89.85 | 1 | 159.60 |
| 2 | Nobunari Oda | Japan | 243.36 | 3 | 87.65 | 3 | 155.71 |
| 3 | Johnny Weir | United States | 237.35 | 4 | 84.60 | 4 | 152.75 |
| 4 | Jeremy Abbott | United States | 235.38 | 5 | 76.65 | 2 | 158.73 |
| 5 | Daisuke Takahashi | Japan | 224.60 | 1 | 89.95 | 5 | 134.65 |
| 6 | Tomáš Verner | Czech Republic | 192.32 | 6 | 70.17 | 6 | 122.15 |

=== Ladies ===
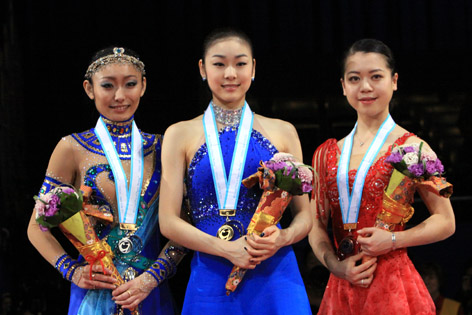
The ladies' podium for the 2009–10 Grand Prix Final.

| Rank | Name | Nation | Total points | SP | | FS | |
|---|---|---|---|---|---|---|---|
| 1 | Kim Yuna | South Korea | 188.86 | 2 | 65.64 | 1 | 123.22 |
| 2 | Miki Ando | Japan | 185.94 | 1 | 66.20 | 2 | 119.74 |
| 3 | Akiko Suzuki | Japan | 174.00 | 5 | 57.54 | 3 | 116.46 |
| 4 | Ashley Wagner | United States | 162.07 | 6 | 54.26 | 4 | 107.81 |
| 5 | Joannie Rochette | Canada | 156.71 | 4 | 60.94 | 5 | 95.77 |
| 6 | Alena Leonova | Russia | 156.55 | 3 | 61.60 | 6 | 94.95 |

=== Pairs ===
Shen Xue / Zhao Hongbo set a new short program world record of 75.36, a new free skating world record of 138.89, and a new combined total score of 214.25.

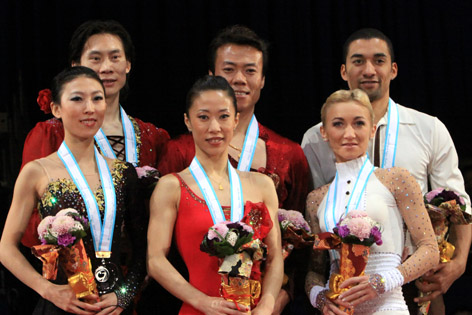
The pairs' podium for the 2009–10 Grand Prix Final.

| Rank | Name | Nation | Total points | SP | | FS | |
|---|---|---|---|---|---|---|---|
| 1 | Shen Xue / Zhao Hongbo | China | 214.25 | 1 | 75.36 | 1 | 138.89 |
| 2 | Pang Qing / Tong Jian | China | 201.86 | 4 | 68.04 | 2 | 133.82 |
| 3 | Aliona Savchenko / Robin Szolkowy | Germany | 200.38 | 2 | 73.14 | 4 | 127.24 |
| 4 | Maria Mukhortova / Maxim Trankov | Russia | 198.35 | 3 | 69.78 | 3 | 128.57 |
| 5 | Yuko Kavaguti / Alexander Smirnov | Russia | 183.01 | 6 | 62.30 | 5 | 120.71 |
| 6 | Zhang Dan / Zhang Hao | China | 180.25 | 5 | 66.24 | 6 | 114.01 |

=== Ice dancing ===
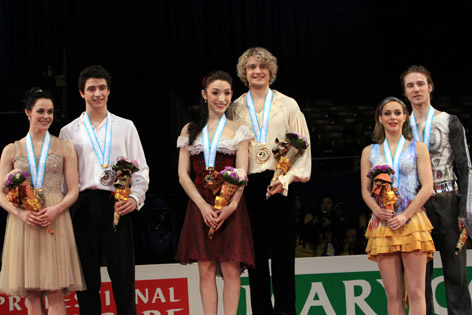
The ice dancing podium for the 2009–10 Grand Prix Final.

| Rank | Name | Nation | Total points | OD | | FD | |
|---|---|---|---|---|---|---|---|
| 1 | Meryl Davis / Charlie White | United States | 169.44 | 1 | 65.80 | 2 | 103.64 |
| 2 | Tessa Virtue / Scott Moir | Canada | 168.22 | 2 | 64.01 | 1 | 104.21 |
| 3 | Nathalie Péchalat / Fabian Bourzat | France | 147.62 | 3 | 56.93 | 3 | 90.69 |
| 4 | Sinead Kerr / John Kerr | United Kingdom | 145.33 | 4 | 56.47 | 4 | 88.86 |
| 5 | Anna Cappellini / Luca Lanotte | Italy | 139.21 | 5 | 54.91 | 5 | 84.30 |
| 6 | Vanessa Crone / Paul Poirier | Canada | 135.99 | 6 | 51.69 | 6 | 84.30 |

== Junior-level results ==
=== Junior men ===
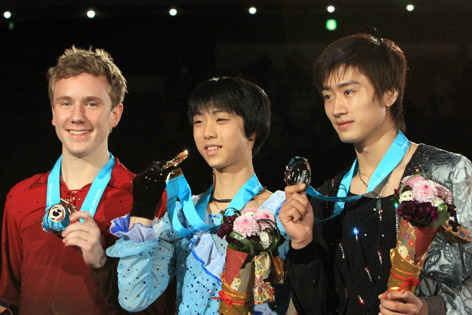
The men's podium for the 2009–10 Junior Grand Prix Final.

| Rank | Name | Nation | Total points | SP | | FS | |
|---|---|---|---|---|---|---|---|
| 1 | Yuzuru Hanyu | Japan | 206.77 | 3 | 69.85 | 1 | 136.92 |
| 2 | Song Nan | China | 204.99 | 1 | 71.70 | 2 | 133.29 |
| 3 | Ross Miner | United States | 196.09 | 2 | 70.85 | 4 | 125.24 |
| 4 | Richard Dornbush | United States | 191.80 | 6 | 59.35 | 3 | 132.45 |
| 5 | Grant Hochstein | United States | 187.92 | 4 | 66.45 | 5 | 121.47 |
| 6 | Artur Gachinski | Russia | 178.03 | 5 | 62.44 | 6 | 115.59 |
| 7 | Stanislav Kovalev | Russia | 163.20 | 7 | 57.69 | 7 | 105.51 |
| 8 | Kento Nakamura | Japan | 142.78 | 8 | 57.16 | 8 | 85.62 |

=== Junior ladies ===
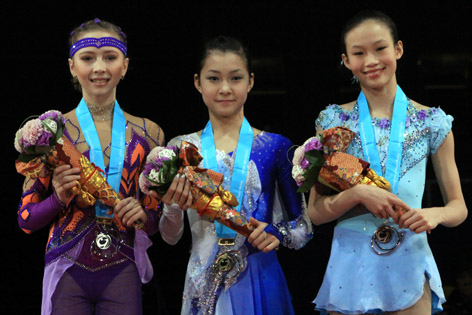
The ladies' podium for the 2009–10 Junior Grand Prix Final.

| Rank | Name | Nation | Total points | SP | | FS | |
|---|---|---|---|---|---|---|---|
| 1 | Kanako Murakami | Japan | 160.53 | 2 | 59.52 | 1 | 101.01 |
| 2 | Polina Shelepen | Russia | 159.29 | 1 | 59.54 | 2 | 99.75 |
| 3 | Christina Gao | United States | 151.47 | 5 | 52.82 | 3 | 98.65 |
| 4 | Ksenia Makarova | Russia | 147.29 | 3 | 55.38 | 4 | 91.91 |
| 5 | Anna Ovcharova | Russia | 144.96 | 4 | 54.92 | 6 | 90.04 |
| 6 | Angela Maxwell | United States | 137.55 | 8 | 47.28 | 5 | 90.27 |
| 7 | Kiri Baga | United States | 122.35 | 7 | 49.58 | 7 | 72.77 |
| 8 | Ellie Kawamura | United States | 120.93 | 6 | 50.30 | 8 | 70.63 |

=== Junior pairs ===
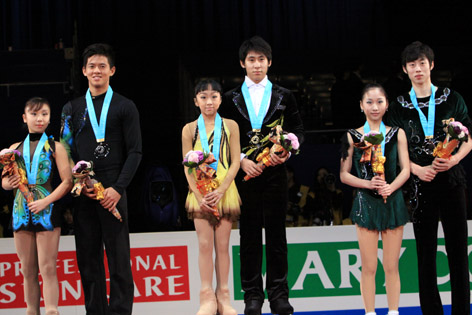
The pairs' podium for the 2009–10 Junior Grand Prix Final.

| Rank | Name | Nation | Total points | SP | | FS | |
|---|---|---|---|---|---|---|---|
| 1 | Sui Wenjing / Han Cong | China | 160.45 | 1 | 56.80 | 1 | 103.65 |
| 2 | Narumi Takahashi / Mervin Tran | Japan | 145.80 | 2 | 54.44 | 2 | 91.36 |
| 3 | Zhang Yue / Wang Lei | China | 137.19 | 5 | 46.04 | 3 | 91.15 |
| 4 | Tatiana Novik / Mikhail Kuznetsov | Russia | 134.33 | 6 | 45.72 | 4 | 88.61 |
| 5 | Kaleigh Hole / Adam Johnson | Canada | 132.17 | 4 | 47.00 | 5 | 85.17 |
| 6 | Britney Simpson / Nathan Miller | United States | 128.62 | 7 | 44.48 | 6 | 84.14 |
| 7 | Ksenia Stolbova / Fedor Klimov | Russia | 122.19 | 3 | 48.90 | 8 | 73.29 |
| 8 | Alexandra Vasilieva / Yuri Shevchuk | Russia | 121.35 | 8 | 43.08 | 7 | 78.27 |

=== Junior ice dancing ===
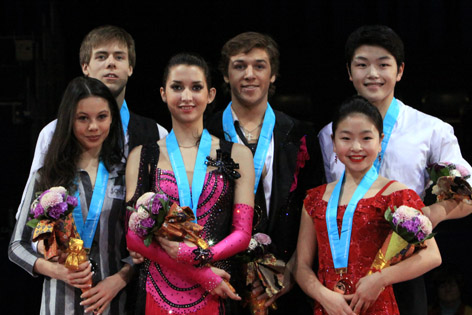
The ice dancing podium for the 2009–10 Junior Grand Prix Final.

| Rank | Name | Nation | Total points | OD | | FD | |
|---|---|---|---|---|---|---|---|
| 1 | Ksenia Monko / Kirill Khaliavin | Russia | 141.21 | 1 | 55.70 | 1 | 85.51 |
| 2 | Elena Ilinykh / Nikita Katsalapov | Russia | 139.36 | 3 | 54.35 | 2 | 85.01 |
| 3 | Maia Shibutani / Alex Shibutani | United States | 138.75 | 2 | 55.21 | 3 | 83.54 |
| 4 | Kharis Ralph / Asher Hill | Canada | 124.75 | 4 | 48.84 | 4 | 75.91 |
| 5 | Ekaterina Pushkash / Jonathan Guerreiro | Russia | 119.50 | 5 | 46.68 | 5 | 72.82 |
| 6 | Isabella Cannuscio / Ian Lorello | United States | 118.11 | 6 | 46.48 | 6 | 71.63 |
| 7 | Lorenza Alessandrini / Simone Vaturi | Italy | 106.78 | 8 | 39.03 | 7 | 67.75 |
| 8 | Marina Antipova / Artem Kudashev | Russia | 106.69 | 7 | 42.17 | 8 | 64.52 |
