= Polina Korobeynikova =

Russian figure skater

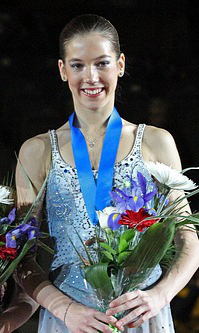
- Korobeynikova on the podium at the 2011 JGP Final

Personal information
- Native name: Полина Александровна Коробейникова
- Full name: Polina Alexandrovna Korobeynikova
- Born: 12 April 1996 (age 30) Moscow, Russia
- Height: 1.68 m (5 ft 6 in)

Figure skating career
- Country: Russia
- Coach: Viktoria Volchkova
- Skating club: Yunost Moskvy
- Began skating: 2000
- Retired: 2014
Medal record
Representing Russia
Ladies' Figure skating: Ladies' singles
Junior Grand Prix Final
Bronze medal – third place	2011–12 Quebec	Ladies' singles

Polina Alexandrovna Korobeynikova (Russian: Полина Александровна Коробейникова; born 12 April 1996) is a Russian former figure skater. She is the 2012 Cup of Nice champion. She placed 4th at the 2012 European Championships.

On the junior level, she is the 2011–12 Junior Grand Prix Final bronze medalist.

== Career ==
Korobeynikova's parents enrolled her in figure skating when she was three-and-a-half in order to improve her health. She loved the activity from the start. She also took skiing lessons. As a young child, Korobeynikova was coached by Eteri Tutberidze but due to Moscow's traffic jams, Tutberidze encouraged her to switch to the Moskvich rink which is nearer to the skater's home. Korobeynikova was coached by Viktoria Volchkova since mid-2007. She was in Volchkova's first group of students after her retirement from competition.

Korobeynikova was 10th on the senior level at the 2011 Russian Championships.

=== 2011–2012 season ===
Korobeynikova made her international debut at the 2011 JGP Brisbane, where she placed 4th. At her next event in Brasov, Romania, she won a silver medal. Her placements qualified her for the Junior Grand Prix Final, where she won the bronze medal, completing a Russian sweep of the podium behind Polina Shelepen and Yulia Lipnitskaya.

Korobeynikova was 7th at the 2012 Russian Championships. Since four skaters above her were age-ineligible, she was named to the Russian team for the 2012 European Championships, where she would make her senior international debut.. Initially, there were concerns that she would not receive her visa in time and would have to be replaced by Sofia Biryukova. She qualified for the short program by winning the preliminary round with a free program containing seven triple jumps, including a triple flip-triple toe combination. Korobeynikova placed 12th in the short program but 2nd in the long program. She received the highest TES score in the ladies' free skating segment – six points higher than the next best, gold medalist Carolina Kostner – after completing another program with seven triple jumps, including the triple flip-triple toe combination. She was awarded a small silver medal for the free skating segment. Korobeynikova finished in 4th place overall, off the podium by 1.8 points. She placed the highest of the three Russian ladies at the event, finishing ahead of Ksenia Makarova and Alena Leonova. Korobeynikova finished 19th at the 2012 World Championships.

2012-2013 season

Korobeynikova had a foot injury prior to the 2012–2013 season.

She began her season at the 2012 Cup of Nice, where she placed eleventh in the short program but first in the free skate to win the gold medal. She made her Grand Prix debut at the 2012 Rostelecom Cup, where she finished in seventh place. She placed sixth at her second assignment, the 2012 Trophée Éric Bompard.

Korobeynikova ended her season with a tenth place finish at the 2013 Russian Championships. She said the season was difficult for her due to an injury and some growing which affected her balance.

2013-2014 season

Korobeynikova withdrew from her sole Grand Prix assignment, the 2013 Cup of China. She did not compete at all for the remainder of the season.

2014-2015 season

Korobeynikova only competed in domestic events this season, finishing eighteenth and last at the 2015 Russian Championships. She retired after this season.

== Programs ==
Season	Short program	Free skating	Exhibition
2014–2015	Elusive Gestures by David Nevue	Adagio in G minor by Remo Giazotto	
2013–2014	James Bond by David Arnold	Scheherazade by Nikolai Rimsky-Korsakov	
2012–2013	Romeo and Juliet by Nino Rota	Swan Lake by Pyotr Tchaikovsky	
2010–2012	Russian Dance (from Swan Lake) by Pyotr Tchaikovsky	Otonal by Raúl Di Blasio	Burlesque by Cher

== Competitive highlights ==
GP: Grand Prix; JGP: Junior Grand Prix

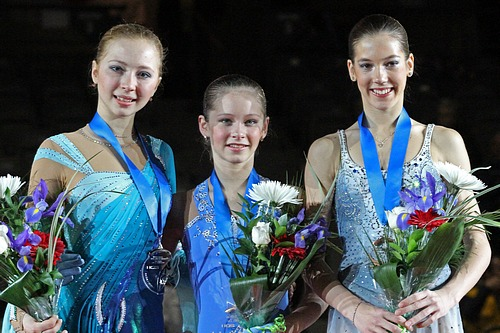
Russians Polina Shelepen(left), Yulia Lipnitskaya(center), and Polina Korobeynikova on the podium at the 2011–12 Junior Grand Prix Final

International
Event	08–09	09–10	10–11	11–12	12–13	13–14	14–15
Worlds.				19th			
Europeans				4th			
GP Cup of China						WD	
GP France					6th		
GP Rostelecom Cup					7th		
Cup of Nice					1st		
International: Junior
JGP Final				3rd			
JGP Australia				4th			
JGP Romania				2nd			
National
Russian Champ.			10th	7th	10th		18th
Russian Jr. Champ.	17th	10th	11th				
WD = Withdrew

== Detailed results ==
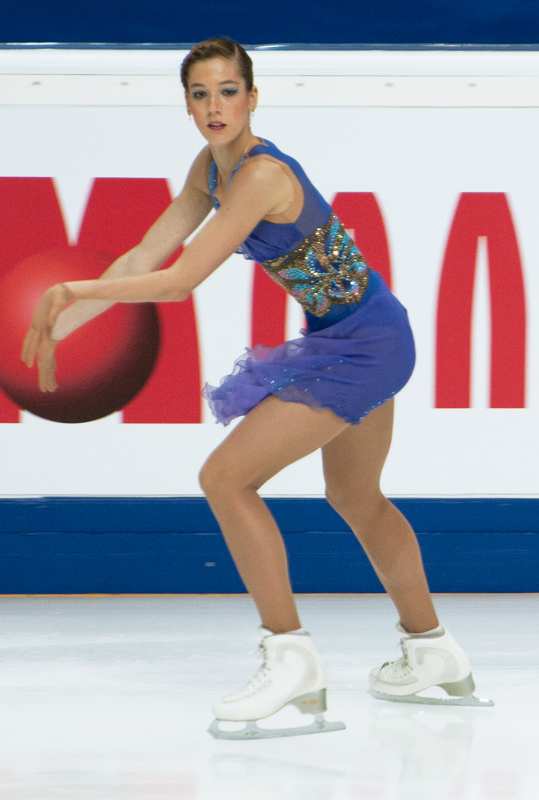
Korobeynikova at the 2012 Rostelecom Cup

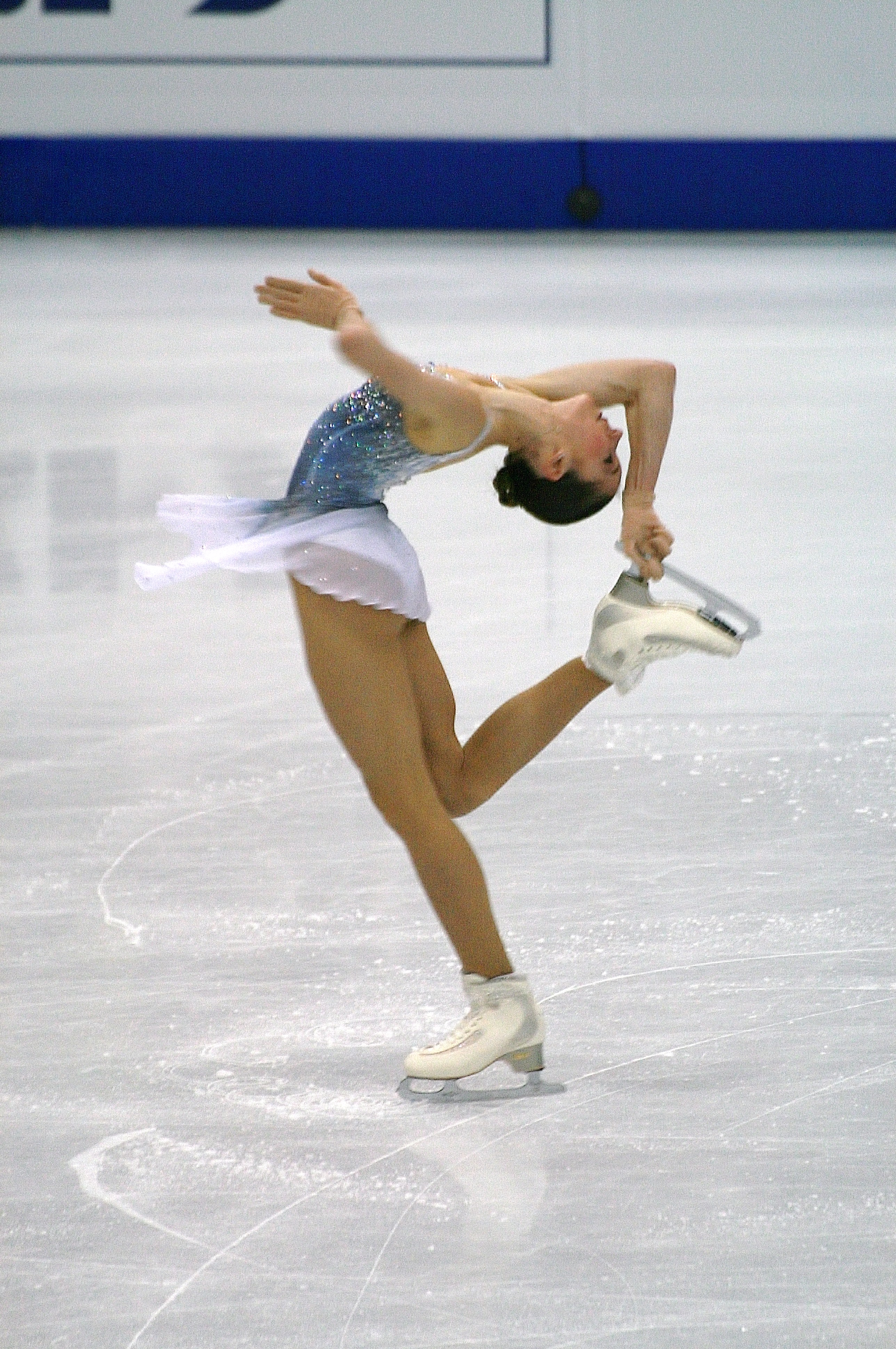
Korobeynikova at the 2012 World Championships

(Small medals for short and free programs awarded only at ISU Championships.)

2012–2013 season
Date	Event	Level	SP	FS	Total
December 25–28, 2012	2013 Russian Championships	Senior	4; 60.85	11; 102.19	10; 163.04
November 8–11, 2012	2012 Trophée Eric Bompard	Senior	5; 54.50	7; 90.32	6; 144.82
November 8–11, 2012	2012 Rostelecom Cup	Senior	8; 51.45	6; 101.87	7; 153.32
October 24–28, 2012	2012 Coupe de Nice	Senior	11; 44.48	1; 105.34	1; 149.82
2011–2012 season
Date	Event	Level	SP	FS	Total
March 26–April 1, 2012	2012 World Championships	Senior	19; 46.71	19; 83.27	19; 129.98
January 25–28, 2012	2012 European Championships	Senior	12; 49.41	2; 114.72	4; 164.13
December 26–27, 2011	2012 Russian Championships	Senior	8; 57.64	9; 107.93	7; 165.57
December 8–10, 2011	2011–12 Junior Grand Prix Final	Junior	5; 45.24	3; 105.94	3; 151.18
September 22–24, 2011	2011 JGP Braşov Cup (Romania)	Junior	2; 48.87	2; 101.00	2; 149.87
September 8–10, 2011	2011 JGP Brisbane (Australia)	Junior	6; 43.34	3; 96.28	4; 139.62
2010–2011 season
Date	Event	Level	SP	FS	Total
February 2–4, 2011	2011 Russian Junior Championships	Junior	17; 40.29	9; 91.97	11; 132.26
December 27–28, 2010	2011 Russian Championships	Senior	10; 53.62	9; 98.53	10; 152.15
