= Katarina Gerboldt =

Russian figure skater (born 1989)

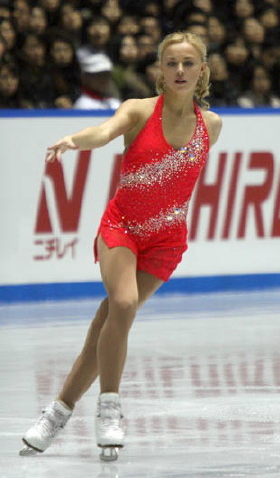
- Gerboldt at the 2008 NHK Trophy

Personal information
- Full name: Katarina Alexandrovna Gerboldt
- Born: 28 March 1989 (age 37) Leningrad, Russian SFSR, Soviet Union
- Height: 1.63 m (5 ft 4 in)

Figure skating career
- Country: Russia
- Skating club: Yubileyny
- Began skating: 1995
- Retired: September 23, 2015

Katarina Alexandrovna Gerboldt (Russian: Катарина Александровна Гербольдт; born 28 March 1989) is a Russian retired figure skater. In single skating, her best result at an ISU Championship was sixth at the 2009 European Championships. In 2010, she switched to pair skating, teaming up with Alexander Enbert. They appeared at one ISU Championship, the 2011 European Championships where they placed fourth.

== Career ==
=== Single skating ===
Gerboldt became interested in figure skating at the age of six. Gerboldt denied the assertion that her parents named her "Katarina" in honor of Katarina Witt, and stated that her parents had indeed wanted her to become a sportswoman, but not specifically a figure skater.

The 2008-09 season was a turning point in Gerboldt's career. She won the bronze medal at the 2009 Russian Championships and, as both the gold and silver medalists Adelina Sotnikova and Elizaveta Tuktamysheva were too young to participate in international competition, was named to the European Championships team. She placed sixth, skating with a drainage in her nose due to sinusitis. She was coached by Tatiana Mishina and Alexei Mishin in Saint Petersburg until 2009 when she moved to CSKA Moscow and began working with Svetlana Sokolovskaya.

=== Pair skating ===
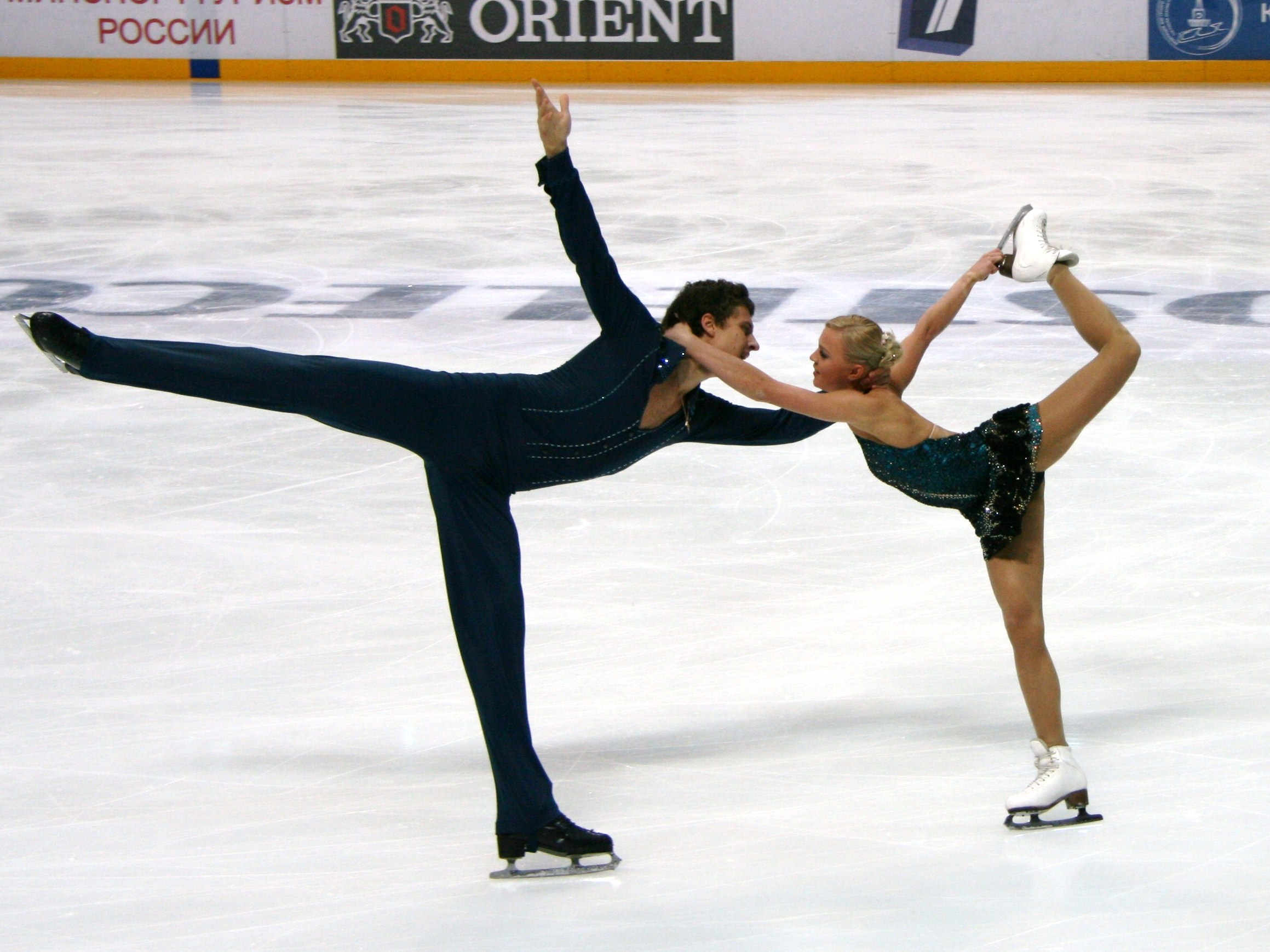
Gerboldt/Enbert at 2010 Cup of Russia

After an unsuccessful 2009–10 season, Tatiana Druchinina suggested to Gerboldt that she switch to pair skating. Gerboldt moved back to Saint Petersburg, where coaches Tamara Moskvina and Artur Dmitriev asked her to try out with Alexander Enbert, whom she knew since childhood. The new partnership was announced in March 2010.

During the 2010–11 season, Gerboldt/Enbert made their international debut at the 2010 Cup of Nice, which they won. They finished fourth at the 2010 Cup of Russia, their sole 2010-11 Grand Prix event. At the 2011 Russian Nationals, they placed fourth in the short program and fifth in the long, to finish fourth overall. As Tatiana Volosozhar / Maxim Trankov were ineligible to compete at the 2011 European Championships, Gerboldt/Enbert were named in2 the team for the event. They placed fifth in the short program with a new personal best score of 57.50, fourth in the free program, also with a new personal best (112.45), and finished fourth overall with 169.95 points, their best combined total.

In the 2011–12 season, Gerboldt/Enbert competed in one Grand Prix event, the 2011 Cup of Russia. In 2012–13, they were assigned to Skate Canada but withdrew due to injury – Gerboldt tore a ligament. She underwent surgery on August 2 – a week after the injury – and on October 3. Coached by Oleg Vasiliev, Gerboldt/Enbert returned to competition in the 2013–14 season but split in April 2014.

On July 12, 2014, it was announced that she had teamed up with French singles skater Brian Joubert. In November 2014, however, Joubert confirmed his competitive retirement.

Gerboldt announced her retirement from competitive figure skating on September 23, 2015, to begin coaching.

== Programs ==
=== Pairs with Enbert ===
Season	Short program	Free skating	Exhibition
2013–2014	Historia de un Amor by Pérez Prado	Angels & Demons by Hans Zimmer	
2011–2012	Gopher Mambo	The Umbrellas of Cherbourg by Michel Legrand choreo. by Natalia Bestemianova, Igor Bobrin	
2010–2011	Charade by Henry Mancini performed by Liberace	Rhapsody in Rock by Robert Wells	I Hate You, Then I Love You by Celine Dion, Luciano Pavarotti

=== Single skating ===
Season	Short program	Free skating
2009–2010	Fanatico by Ari Zakarian, Edvin Marton	Infiltrado by Palio
2008–2009	Seven Years in Tibet by John Williams	Carmen by Georges Bizet
2007–2008	Classical medley	Sheherazade by Nikolai Rimsky-Korsakov
2005–2006	Orient Qualibet by Sarah Brightman	Soundtrack medley

== Competitive highlights ==
=== Pair skating with Enbert ===
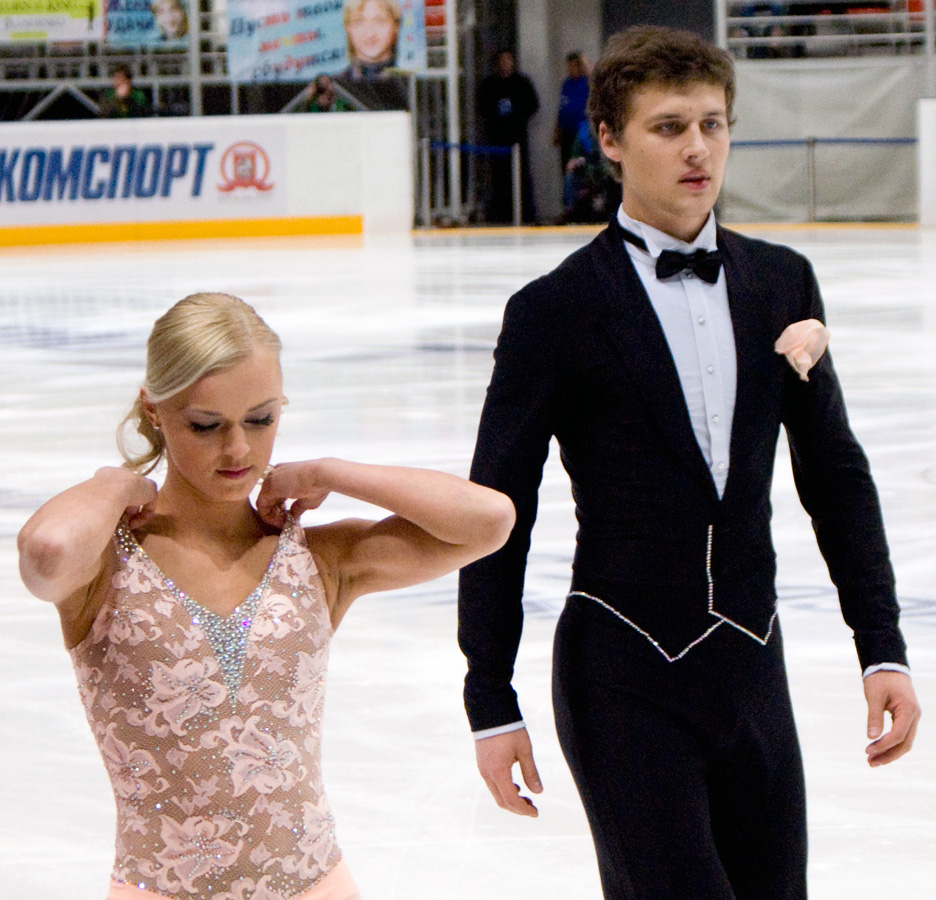
Gerboldt and Enbert at 2010 Cup of Russia

Results
International
Event	2010–11	2011–12	2012–13	2013–14
Europeans	4th			
GP Cup of Russia	4th	5th		
GP Skate Canada			WD	
Bavarian Open		2nd		2nd
Cup of Nice	1st	2nd		
Lombardia				3rd
National
Russian Champ.	4th	4th		7th
GP = Grand Prix; WD = Withdrew

=== Single skating ===
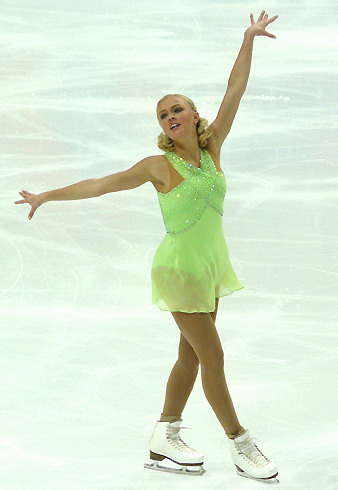
Gerboldt during her short program at the 2007 Cup of Russia

Results
International
Event	2004–05	2005–06	2006–07	2007–08	2008–09	2009–10
Worlds		26th				
Europeans					6th	
GP Cup of Russia				10th		10th
GP NHK Trophy					12th	
Finlandia					9th	6th
Golden Spin				3rd	WD	3rd
NRW Trophy						2nd
Universiade			11th		5th	
International: Junior
Junior Worlds		10th		9th		
Triglav Trophy	2nd J.					
National
Russian Champ.	15th	5th	12th	4th	3rd	9th
Russian Junior		2nd	9th	1st		
Team events
World Team					5T/12P	
GP = Grand Prix; J. = Junior level; WD = Withdrew; T = Team result; P = Personal result
