= Efremenkov =

Efremenkov or Yefremenkov (Russian: Ефременков) is a Russian masculine surname, its feminine counterpart is Efremenkova or Yefremenkova. It may refer to

- Ekaterina Efremenkova (born 1997), Russian speed skater
- Feodosiy Efremenkov (born 1996), Russian figure skater
