= Anna Pogorilaya =

Russian retired figure skater

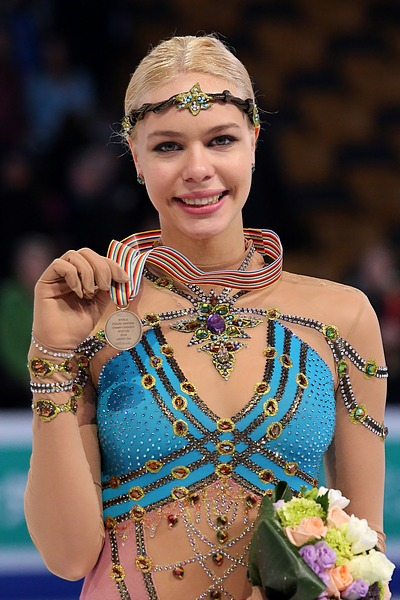
- Pogorilaya at the 2016 World Figure Skating Championships

Personal information
- Native name: Анна Алексеевна Погорилая
- Full name: Anna Alexeyevna Pogorilaya
- Other names: Anna Pogorilaya-Nevskaia
- Born: 10 April 1998 (age 28) Moscow, Russia
- Height: 1.67 m (5 ft 5 1/2 in)

Figure skating career
- Country: Russia
- Coach: Viktoria Butsayeva
- Skating club: Sambo 70
- Began skating: 2002
- Retired: October 2017
Medal record
Representing Russia
Figure skating: Ladies' singles
World Championships
Bronze medal – third place	2016 Boston	Ladies' singles
European Championships
Silver medal – second place	2017 Ostrava	Ladies' singles
Bronze medal – third place	2015 Stockholm	Ladies' singles
Bronze medal – third place	2016 Bratislava	Ladies' singles
Grand Prix Final
Bronze medal – third place	2016–17 Marseille	Ladies' singles
Russian Championships
Bronze medal – third place	2016 Yekaterinburg	Ladies' singles
World Junior Championships
Bronze medal – third place	2013 Milan	Ladies' singles
Junior Grand Prix Final
Bronze medal – third place	2012–13 Sochi	Ladies' singles

Anna Alexeyevna Pogorilaya (Russian: Анна Алексеевна Погорилая; born 10 April 1998) is a former Russian figure skater. She is the 2016 World bronze medalist, a three-time European medalist (silver in 2017; bronze in 2015 and 2016), and the 2016 Russian national bronze medalist. She won gold at three Grand Prix events – the 2013 Cup of China, 2016 Rostelecom Cup, and 2016 NHK Trophy. Earlier in her career, she won bronze at the 2013 World Junior Championships and at the 2012–13 Junior Grand Prix Final.

== Personal life ==
Anna Alexeyevna Pogorilaya was born 10 April 1998 in Moscow, Russia. Her parents are from Kharkiv, Ukraine. She has a brother who is three years older. In 2016, she enrolled at the Moscow Institute of Physical Culture and Sports. In May 2018, she became engaged to Russian ice dancer Andrey Nevskiy, whom she met in 2015. They were married in July 2018.

Their daughter, Eva Andreyevna Nevskaya, was born on 22 December 2020.

Anna enjoys baking for her family in her free time.

== Career ==
=== Early years ===
Pogorilaya began skating at age four. Anna Tsareva became her coach around 2004.

Pogorilaya missed the 2009–2010 season due to Osgood–Schlatter affecting both of her legs, as well as a concussion. She placed 15th at the Russian Junior Championships in 2011 and 13th in 2012.

=== 2012–2013 season: World Junior bronze medal ===
In the 2012–2013 season, Pogorilaya made her ISU Junior Grand Prix debut. After taking bronze in Croatia, her first event, she then won gold at the JGP event in Germany. She qualified for the JGP Final in Sochi, where she won the bronze medal. At the Russian Championships, Pogorilaya placed fifth in her senior debut and sixth on the junior level. She took the bronze medal at the 2013 World Junior Championships in Milan, with teammates Elena Radionova and Yulia Lipnitskaya taking the gold and silver medals respectively.

=== 2013–2014 season: Senior international debut ===
Making her senior Grand Prix debut, Pogorilaya placed third in the short program and first in the free skate at the 2013 Cup of China. She edged out teammate Adelina Sotnikova and Italian Carolina Kostner for the gold medal. After winning bronze at the 2013 Trophee Eric Bompard, behind Sotnikova, she qualified for her first senior Grand Prix Final. In early December 2013, Pogorilaya said she was receiving more ice time and training twice as much as before. In Fukuoka, Japan, she placed sixth in the short program, fifth in the free skate, and sixth overall.

Following an eighth-place result at the 2014 Russian Championships, she was not assigned to the 2014 European Championships but was later named in the Russian team to the 2014 World Championships. At Worlds in Saitama, Japan, Pogorilaya placed sixth in the short program and third in the free skate, scoring personal bests in both segments. She won a small bronze medal for the free skate and finished fourth overall, behind Carolina Kostner.

=== 2014–2015 season: First European medal ===
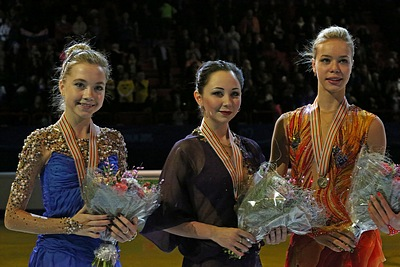
Pogorilaya at the 2015 European Championships podium

Pogorilaya started her season at the 2014 Japan Open. She placed third with a score of 122.52 points in her free skate, helping Team Europe win the gold medal. Competing at her first Grand Prix event of the season, the 2014 Skate Canada, she placed first in both programs and won the gold medal with a total of 191.81 points. She took the silver medal behind Rika Hongo at the 2014 Rostelecom Cup and qualified for her second GP Final. She finished fourth at the 2014–15 Grand Prix Final in Barcelona after placing fourth in both segments. She then finished fourth at the 2015 Russian Championships, having ranked fourth in both segments.

Pogorilaya was selected to compete at the 2015 European Championships and won the bronze medal after placing third in both segments. She was also named in Russia's team for the 2015 World Championships in Shanghai, China. Before the event, she had been off the ice for a month after spraining her ankle and partially tearing her ligament during practice. Despite not having fully recovered from her injury, she chose to compete anyway. In the short program she had a hard fall on her triple loop and hit her face, placing 9th. In the free program, she singled a triple Lutz and fell twice, on another triple Lutz and on a double Axel-triple toe loop combination. She placed 13th in the free skate and 13th overall.

=== 2015–2016 season: World bronze medal ===
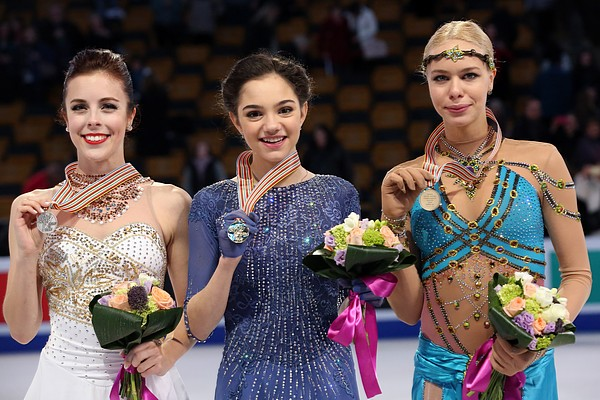
Pogorilaya at the 2016 World Championships podium

Starting her season on the ISU Challenger Series (CS), Pogorilaya took silver at the 2015 Ondrej Nepela Trophy after placing 9th in the short program and first in the free skate. She won the 2015 CS Mordovian Ornament with personal bests in all segments. Competing on the Grand Prix series, Pogorilaya finished 4th at the 2015 Cup of China and 9th at the 2015 NHK Trophy, she had a series of multiple falls in her short and free programs in both of her Grand Prix events. At the end of December, she won the bronze medal at the 2016 Russian Championships in Yekaterinburg as well as Russia's third spot at Europeans, having placed fourth in the short and third in the free.

In late January 2016, Pogorilaya repeated as the bronze medalist at the European Championships, which were held in Bratislava, Slovakia. At the 2016 World Championships in Boston, she placed second in the short program and fourth in the free skate, winning the bronze medal behind Russia's Evgenia Medvedeva and USA's Ashley Wagner.

=== 2016–2017 season: First Grand Prix Final medal ===
Pogorilaya won both of her Grand Prix events, the 2016 Rostelecom Cup and 2016 NHK Trophy. In December, she obtained the bronze medal in Marseille, France, at her third Grand Prix Final. Later that month, she finished 4th behind Maria Sotskova at the 2017 Russian Championships. She injured her knee in practice at the event before the free skate.

At the 2017 World Championships, Pogorilaya placed fourth in the short program but her 15th-place free skate, in which she fell three times, dropped her to 13th overall. She did not participate in the 2017 World Team Trophy.

=== 2017–2018 season: Olympic season ===
Due to an injury, Pogorilaya did not participate in the Russian test skates in Sochi during 9–10 September 2017. On 15 October 2017, she performed a new Spanish-themed short program during the second stage of the Russian Cup series held in Yoshkar-Ola; she finished behind Stanislava Konstantinova and Polina Tsurskaya. She withdrew from the next segment due to back discomfort.

In October, Pogorilaya competed at the 2017 Skate Canada International, placing second in the short program, 10th in the free skate, and 9th overall. She withdrew from her next Grand Prix event, the 2017 Skate America. Due to her back problems, she withdrew from the Russian Championships, saying that she was unable to train and that her season was over. After half a year off the ice and undergoing rehab to strengthen her muscles, she resumed skating, coached by Tsareva at a new rink.

== Programs ==
Season	Short program	Free skating	Exhibition
2018–2019	Esperanza by Maxime Rodriguez choreo. by Pasquale Camerlengo	Frida by Elliot Goldenthal choreo. by Anna Tsareva	
2017–2018	Esperanza by Maxime Rodriguez choreo. by Pasquale Camerlengo	Swan Lake by Pyotr Tchaikovsky choreo. by Nikolai Morozov	Frida by Elliot Goldenthal choreo. by Anna Tsareva; I Dreamed a Dream from Les Misérables; Anna Karenina by Dario Marianelli
2016–2017	Scent of a Woman (soundtrack - Smoku remix) choreo. by Misha Ge	Modigliani Suite by Guy Farley; Le di a la caza alcance by Estrella Morente, Michael Nyman; Memorial Requiem by Michael Nyman choreo. by Nikolai Morozov	Rise Like a Phoenix by Conchita Wurst; When You Wish Upon a Star by Leigh Harline, Ned Washington; The Rose by Amanda McBroom; All I Ask by Adele; Into You by Ariana Grande; Hush Hush; Hush Hush by The Pussycat Dolls
2015–2016	Boléro for Violin and Orchestra by Vanessa-Mae choreo. by Nikolai Morozov	Scheherazade by Nikolai Rimsky-Korsakov choreo. by Nikolai Morozov	Tango in a Madhouse by Alfred Schnittke
2014–2015	Adagio in G minor by Remo Giazotto, Tomaso Albinoni performed by Il Divo; Adagio in G minor by Remo Giazotto, Tomaso Albinoni performed by Lara Fabian	The Firebird by Igor Stravinsky	The Fifth Element by Éric Serra; Rise Like a Phoenix by Conchita Wurst
2013–2014	El Choclo (Kiss of Fire) performed by Ikuko Kawai	Mermaids (from Pirates of the Caribbean: On Stranger Tides) by Hans Zimmer	Adagio in G minor by Remo Giazotto, Tomaso Albinoni; Cats by Andrew Lloyd Webber
2012–2013	Songs from the Victorious City by Anne Dudley	Danse de Phryne (from Faust) by Charles Gounod	El Tango de Roxanne (from Moulin Rouge!); Skyfall by Adele
2011–2012	Adagio by Secret Garden	Moulin Rouge! by Craig Armstrong	
2010–2011	Swan Lake by Pyotr Tchaikovsky	El Tango de Roxanne (from Moulin Rouge!)	

== Competitive highlights ==
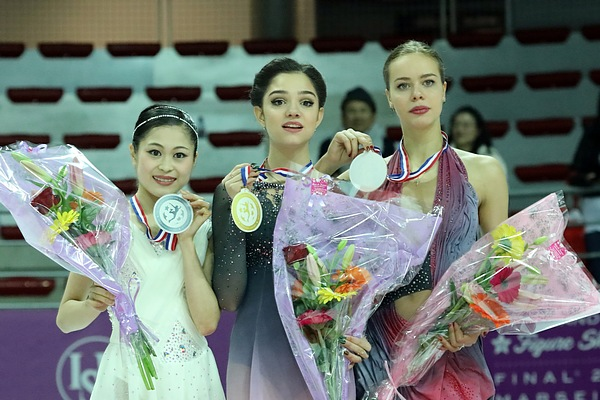
Pogorilaya at the 2016–17 Grand Prix Final podium

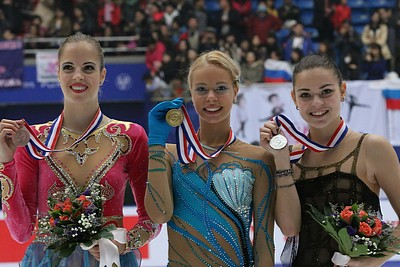
Pogorilaya at the 2013 Cup of China podium

GP: Grand Prix; CS: Challenger Series; JGP: Junior Grand Prix

International
Event	10–11	11–12	12–13	13–14	14–15	15–16	16–17	17–18	18–19
Worlds				4th	13th	3rd	13th		
Europeans					3rd	3rd	2nd		
GP Final				6th	4th		3rd		
GP Bompard				3rd					
GP Cup of China				1st		4th			
GP NHK Trophy						9th	1st		
GP Rostelecom Cup					2nd		1st		
GP Skate America								WD	
GP Skate Canada					1st			9th	
CS Finlandia							3rd		
CS Golden Spin									WD
CS Mordovian						1st			
CS Ondrej Nepela						2nd			
International: Junior
Junior Worlds			3rd						
JGP Final			3rd						
JGP Croatia			3rd						
JGP Germany			1st						
National
Russian Champ.			5th	8th	4th	3rd	4th	WD	
Russian Junior; Champ.	15th	13th	6th						
Team events
Japan Open					1st T 3rd P		2nd T 4th P		
TBD = Assigned; WD = Withdrew; T = Team result; P = Personal result. Medals awarded for team result only.

== Detailed results ==
Small medals for short and free programs awarded only at ISU Championships. At team events, medals awarded for team results only.

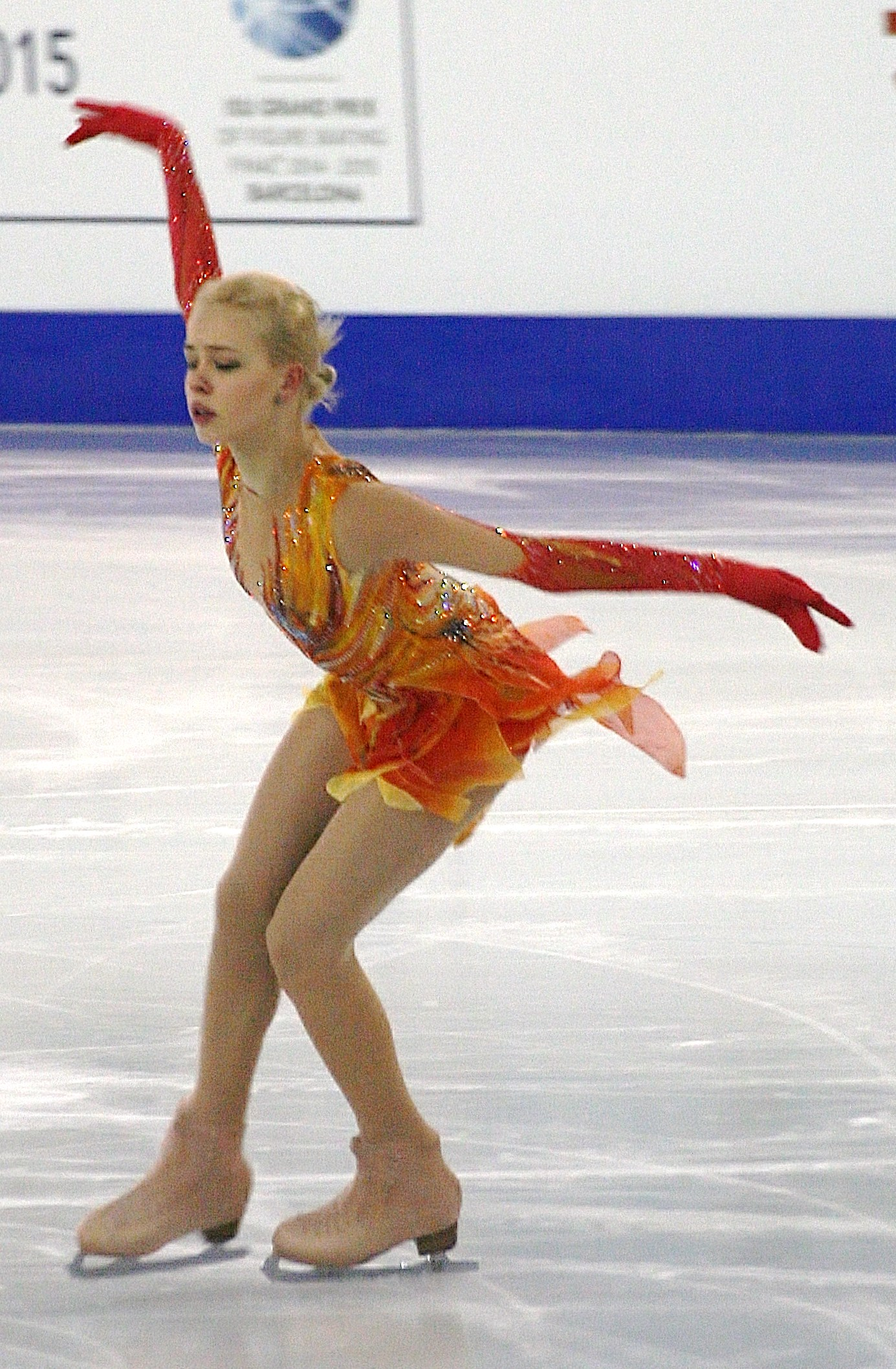
Pogorilaya at the 2014–15 Grand Prix Final

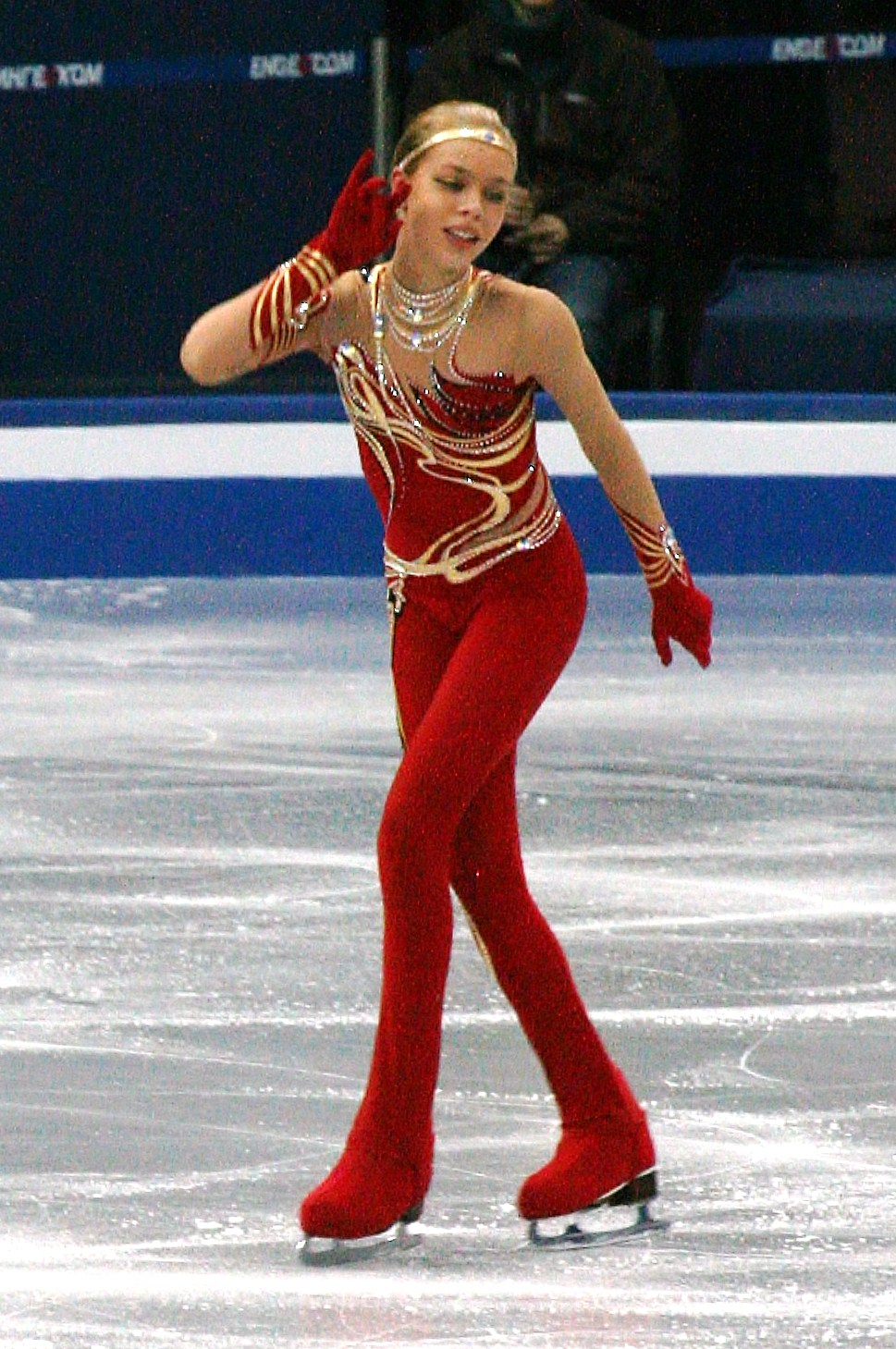
Pogorilaya at the 2012–13 JGP Final

2017–2018 season
Date	Event	SP	FS	Total
27–29 October 2017	2017 Skate Canada	2; 69.05	10; 87.84	9; 156.89
2016–2017 season
Date	Event	SP	FS	Total
29 March – 2 April 2017	2017 World Championships	4; 71.52	15; 111.85	13; 183.37
25–29 January 2017	2017 European Championships	2; 74.39	3; 137.00	2; 211.39
20–26 December 2016	2017 Russian Championships	4; 73.45	4; 142.17	4; 215.62
8–11 December 2016	2016–17 Grand Prix Final	4; 73.29	3; 143.18	3; 216.47
25–27 November 2016	2016 NHK Trophy	1; 71.56	1; 139.30	1; 210.86
4–6 November 2016	2016 Rostelecom Cup	1; 73.93	1; 141.28	1; 215.21
6–10 October 2016	2016 CS Finlandia Trophy	1; 69.50	3; 113.30	3; 182.80
1 October 2016	2016 Japan Open	- -	4; 132.04	4P/2T
2015–2016 season
Date	Event	SP	FS	Total
28 March – 3 April 2016	2016 World Championships	2; 73.98	4; 139.71	3; 213.69
26–31 January 2016	2016 European Championships	3; 63.81	3; 123.24	3; 187.05
24–27 December 2015	2016 Russian Championships	4; 71.22	3; 143.08	3; 214.30
27–29 November 2015	2015 NHK Trophy	11; 47.35	4; 117.28	9; 164.63
6–8 November 2015	2015 Cup of China	4; 61.47	4; 122.69	4; 184.16
15–18 October 2015	2015 Mordovian Ornament	2; 72.26	1; 141.81	1; 214.07
1–3 October 2015	2015 Ondrej Nepela Trophy	9; 53.01	1; 125.37	2; 178.38
2014–2015 season
Date	Event	SP	FS	Total
23–29 March 2015	2015 World Championships	9; 60.50	13; 99.81	13; 160.31
28 January – 1 February 2015	2015 European Championships	3; 66.10	3; 125.71	3; 191.81
24–27 December 2014	2015 Russian Championships	4; 71.17	4; 133.34	4; 204.51
11–14 December 2014	2014-15 Grand Prix Final	4; 61.34	4; 118.95	4; 180.29
14–15 November 2014	2014 Rostelecom Cup	3; 59.32	2; 114.11	2; 173.43
31 October – 1 November 2014	2014 Skate Canada	1; 65.28	1; 126.53	1; 191.81
2–4 October 2014	2014 Japan Open	- -	3; 122.52	1
2013–2014 season
Date	Event	SP	FS	Total
27–29 March 2014	2014 World Championships	6; 66.26	3; 131.24	4; 197.50
24–26 December 2013	2014 Russian Championships	10; 59.35	5; 121.53	8; 180.88
5–8 December 2013	2013–14 Grand Prix Final	6; 59.81	5; 112.07	6; 171.88
15–17 November 2013	2013 Trophee Eric Bompard	2; 60.03	3; 124.66	3; 184.69
1–2 November 2013	2013 Cup of China	3; 60.24	1; 118.38	1; 178.62

2012–2013 season
Date	Event	Level	SP	FS	Total
1–2 March 2013	2013 World Junior Championships	Junior	2; 53.98	3; 106.34	3; 160.32
2–3 February 2013	2013 Russian Junior Championships	Junior	8; 58.34	5; 112.52	6; 170.86
25–28 December 2012	2013 Russian Championships	Senior	5; 60.45	5; 116.13	5; 176.58
6–8 December 2012	2012 Junior Grand Prix Final	Junior	3; 57.94	3; 109.46	3; 167.40
11–12 October 2012	2012 JGP Germany	Junior	3; 53.81	1; 106.71	1; 160.52
4–6 October 2012	2012 JGP Croatia	Junior	2; 51.67	5; 93.87	3; 145.54
2011–2012 season
Date	Event	Level	SP	FS	Total
5–7 February 2012	2012 Russian Junior Championships	Junior	8; 50.96	13; 91.42	13; 142.38
2010–11 season
Date	Event	Level	SP	FS	Total
3–4 February 2011	2011 Russian Junior Championships	Junior	15; 41.26	15; 80.70	15; 121.96
