= Ksenia Monko =

Russian ice dancer (born 1992)

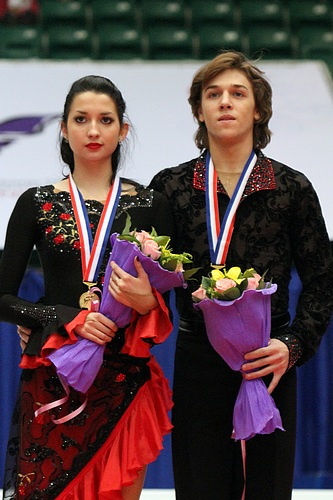
- Ksenia Monko and Kirill Khaliavin at the 2010–11 Junior Grand Prix Final

Personal information
- Full name: Ksenia Ivanovna Monko
- Born: 8 February 1992 (age 34) Kirov, Kirov Oblast, Russia
- Height: 1.70 m (5 ft 7 in)

Figure skating career
- Country: Russia
- Discipline: Ice dance
- Partner: Kirill Khaliavin
- Began skating: 1996
- Retired: 2015

Medal record
Representing Russia
Russian Championships
Silver medal – second place	2015 Sochi	Ice dance
World Junior Championships
Gold medal – first place	2011 Gangneung	Ice dance
Bronze medal – third place	2010 The Hague	Ice dance
Junior Grand Prix Final
Gold medal – first place	2009–10 Tokyo	Ice dance
Gold medal – first place	2010–11 Beijing	Ice dance

Ksenia Ivanovna Monko (Russian: Ксения Ивановна Монько; born 8 February 1992) is a former competitive ice dancer for Russia. Alongside Kirill Khaliavin, she is the 2011 World Junior champion, a two-time (2009–10, 2010–11) Junior Grand Prix Final champion, and the 2015 Russian national silver medalist.

== Personal life ==
Ksenia Ivanovna Monko was born 8 February 1992 in Kirov, Kirov Oblast. She is the younger sister of Russian ice dancer Maria Monko. Ksenia married Kirill Khaliavin on 10 June 2017 in Kirov, Russia. Their son was born in October 2020.

In February 2022, following the Russian invasion of Ukraine, Monko and her family relocated indefinitely to Madrid, Spain.

== Career ==
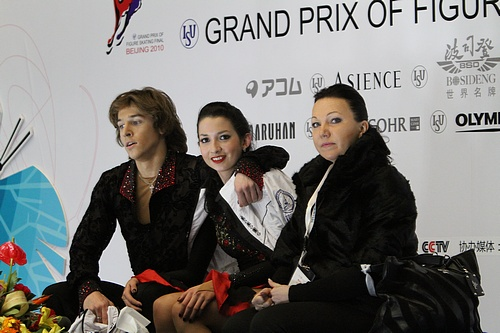
Monko with her partner Kirill Khaliavin and Olga Riabinina

=== Early career ===
Ksenia Monko began skating at age four and switched to ice dance early, at age five. Her first coach was Svetlana Tamrieva.

Monko teamed up with Khaliavin in 2000. They trained in Kirov before problems with ice time led them to move to Rostov in 2005. They relocated with their coach to Moscow in May 2009.

During the 2009–10 season, they won the Junior Grand Prix Final and the Russian Junior title. They took the bronze at the 2010 World Junior Championships.

During the 2010–11 season, Monko/Khaliavin won their second JGP Final title, and followed that up with their second Russian Junior title. They won gold at the 2011 World Junior Championships.

=== Senior career ===
Monko/Khaliavin moved up to the senior level for the 2011–12 season. They were assigned to compete at 2011 Skate America and 2011 Cup of China as their Grand Prix events but Khaliavin fell ill with mononucleosis in September. They withdrew from both Grand Prix events but returned to competition at the Russian Championships where they finished 5th.

In February 2012, Monko/Khaliavin switched coaches to Alexander Zhulin and Oleg Volkov. They finished 6th at the 2012 Rostelecom Cup and 4th at the 2013 Russian Championships. They joined the Russian team to the 2013 World Team Trophy, replacing Ekaterina Bobrova / Dmitri Soloviev who withdrew due to injury. Monko/Khaliavin finished 3rd at the event and Team Russia finished 4th overall. The duo withdrew from the exhibitions after Khaliavin developed an infection resulting in a high fever.

In the 2013–14 season, Monko/Khaliavin won silver at the 2013 Nebelhorn Trophy, behind Americans Madison Hubbell / Zachary Donohue, and then bronze at the 2013 International Cup of Nice. Their Grand Prix results were sixth at the 2013 Trophée Eric Bompard and fifth at the 2013 Rostelecom Cup. After placing fifth at the 2014 Russian Championships, they were not selected for the Olympics.

For the 2014–15 Grand Prix season, Monko/Khaliavin placed fourth at 2014 Skate Canada International and second at 2014 NHK Trophy. They went on to place second at the 2015 Russian Championships. They finished 10th at the 2015 European Championships and eighth at the 2015 World Championships.

For the 2015–16 Grand Prix, Monko/Khaliavin started their season by finishing fourth at 2015 Skate Canada International, they withdrew from their second assignment at the 2015 Rostelecom Cup due to Monko's injury. In 2016, she retired from competition due to the injury.

=== Coaching career ===
In June 2023, Monko, Khaliavin, and Khaliavin's other ice dance partner, Sara Hurtado, opened the SK International Ice Dance School in Madrid, Spain.

Their students have included:

- (Kazakhstan) Gaukhar Nauryzova / Boyisangur Datiev
- (Lithuania) Paulina Ramanauskaitė / Deividas Kizala
- (Spain) Sofía Val / Asaf Kazimov

== Programs ==
With Khaliavin

Season	Short dance	Free dance	Exhibition
2015–16	Polka and waltz: Howl's Moving Castle by Joe Hisaishi	Torn by Nathan Lanier; Eternal by William Joseph	
2014–15	Flamenco: Suite Festiva de Éxitos IV by Pascual Gonzalez, Cantores de Hispalis, David Bisbal; Paso doble: España cañí by Pascual Marquina Narro; Flamenco: La Danza del Amor by Cantores de Hispalis	Sarabande by Escala; Sarabande Suite by Globus	
2013–14	Quickstep by Big Bad Voodoo Daddy; Foxtrot: LOVE by Nat King Cole	Music by René Aubry; Music by Gaetano Donizetti	
2012–13	Waltz: Sous le Ciel de Paris by Yves Montand; Polka:	?; Me Voy by Jasmin Levy	
2011–12	Samba: Paxi Ni Ngongo by Bonga; Samba:	Tango Medley: Duo de Amor; Oblivion by Astor Piazzolla; No Stop City by New Tango Orquesta	
2010–11	Waltz: Padam, padam... by Édith Piaf	Frida by Elliot Goldenthal	Ukrainian folk dance: Nich Yaka Misyachna (Ukrainian: Ніч яка місячна); Hopak
	Original dance		
2009–10	Ukrainian folk dance: Nich Yaka Misyachna (Ukrainian: Ніч яка місячна); Hopak	It's a Man's Man's Man's World performed by James Brown, Luciano Pavarotti	Più che puoi by Eros Ramazzotti, Cher

== Competitive highlights ==
- GP – Event of the ISU Grand Prix Series
- JGP – Event of the ISU Junior Grand Prix Series
- CS – Event of the ISU Challenger Series
- WD – Withdrew from competition

=== Ice dance with Kirill Khaliavin ===
Competition placements at senior level
Season	2011–12	2012–13	2013–14	2014–15	2015–16
World Championships				8th	
European Championships				10th	
Spanish Championships	5th	4th	5th	2nd	
World Team Trophy		4th (3rd)			
GP NHK Trophy				2nd	
GP Rostelecom Cup		6th	5th		WD
GP Skate Canada				4th	5th
GP Trophée Éric Bompard			6th		
Cup of Nice		1st	3rd		
Ice Star				1st	1st
Nebelhorn Trophy		4th	2nd		
Winter Universiade			6th		

Competition placements at junior level
Season	2006–07	2007–08	2008–09	2009–10	2010–11
World Junior Championships				3rd	1st
Junior Grand Prix Final				1st	1st
Russian Championships	8th	4th	5th	1st	1st
JGP Belarus				1st	
JGP Croatia		3rd			
JGP Czech Republic			5th		
JGP Great Britain					1st
JGP Norway	11th				
JGP Romania		3rd			1st
JGP South Africa			3rd		
JGP Turkey				1st	
