= Polina Agafonova =

Russian figure skater

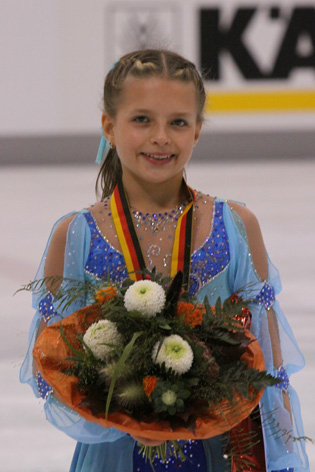
- Agafonova in 2009

Personal information
- Native name: Полина Владиславовна Агафонова
- Born: 2 April 1996 (age 30) Severodvinsk, Arkhangelsk Oblast, Russia
- Height: 1.45 m (4 ft 9 in)

Figure skating career
- Country: Russia
- Skating club: St. Petersburg Olympic School
- Began skating: 2001
- Retired: 2015
Medal record
Representing Russia
World Junior Championships
Bronze medal – third place	2010 The Hague	Ladies' singles
European Youth Olympic Festival
Gold medal – first place	2011 Liberec	Ladies' singles

Polina Vladislavovna Agafonova (Russian: Полина Владисла́вовна Агафонова; born 2 April 1996) is a Russian former competitive figure skater. She is the 2010 World Junior bronze medalist and 2010 Russian national junior champion.

== Career ==
During the 2009–10 season, Agafonova debuted on the Junior Grand Prix (JGP) series. She won a bronze medal in Germany and placed sixth in Poland. She won gold at the Russian Junior Nationals and was sent to compete at the Junior Worlds, Agafonova won the bronze medal at the event.

During the 2010–11 season, Agafonova won no JGP medals in her events and dropped to 7th at Russian Junior Nationals. She was not sent to Junior Worlds.

In the 2011–12 season, Agafonova was assigned to Junior Grand Prix events in Latvia and Austria and won a pair of bronze medals. Agafonova then competed on the senior level at the 2011 Coupe de Nice and won the gold medal. She finished 4th at the 2012 Russian Junior Championships.

== Programs ==
Season	Short program	Free skating
2012–13	Malagueña by Ernesto Lecuona	Danse Macabre by Camille Saint-Saëns
2011–12	Malagueña by Ernesto Lecuona	The Matrix by Rob Dougan
2010–11	Korobushka by Bond	Countess Maritza by Emmerich Kálmán
2009–10	Russian Dance	Romeo and Juliet Ouverture by Pyotr Tchaikovsky

== Competitive highlights ==
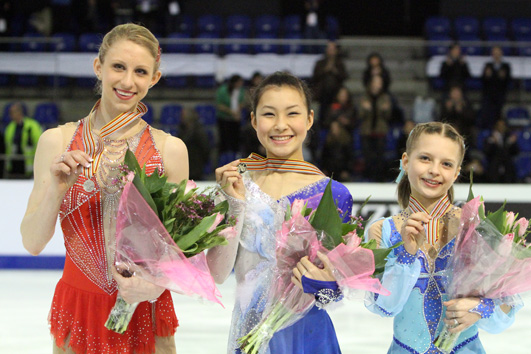
Agafonova at the 2010 World Junior Championships

International
Event	08–09	09–10	10–11	11–12	12–13	13–14
Cup of Nice				1st	6th	4th
NRW Trophy						2nd
Triglav Trophy					3rd	
International: Junior
Junior Worlds		3rd				
JGP Austria			7th	3rd		
JGP Germany		3rd	4th			
JGP Latvia				3rd		
JGP Poland		6th				
EYOF			1st			
National
Russian Champ.		10th	9th	14th		16th
Russian Junior	7th	1st	7th	4th		

=== Detailed results ===
2011–12 season
Date	Event	Level	SP	FS	Total
February 5–7, 2012	2012 Russian Junior Championships	Junior	3; 60.59	4; 110.10	4; 170.69
December 25–29, 2011	2012 Russian Championships	Senior	15; 50.30	11; 97.84	14; 148.14
October 26–30, 2011	2011 Coupe de Nice	Senior	1; 54.60	1; 99.67	1; 154.27
September 28 - October 1, 2011	2011 Junior Grand Prix, Austria	Junior	1; 55.97	3; 92.68	3; 148.65
August 31 – September 3, 2011	2011 Junior Grand Prix, Latvia	Junior	2; 54.60	5; 87.24	3; 141.84
2010–11 season
Date	Event	Level	SP	FS	Total
February 12–19, 2011	2011 European Youth Olympic Festival	Junior	1; 57.80	1; 106.26	1; 164.06
February 2–4, 2011	2011 Russian Junior Championships	Junior	8; 50.99	7; 94.62	7; 145.61
December 26–29, 2010	2011 Russian Championships	Senior	6; 58.42	10; 96.06	9; 154.48
October 6–10, 2010	2010–2011 Junior Grand Prix, Germany	Junior	3; 47.20	5; 88.59	4; 135.79
September 15–19, 2010	2010–2011 Junior Grand Prix, Austria	Junior	3; 51.50	12; 72.74	7; 124.24
2009–10 season
Date	Event	Level	SP	FS	Total
March 8–14, 2010	2010 ISU World Junior Championships	Junior	3; 56.28	4; 97.99	3; 154.27
February 3–6, 2010	2010 Russian Junior Championships	Junior	2; 58.52	2; 108.19	1; 166.71
December 23–27, 2009	2010 Russian Championships	Senior	13; 42.87	8; 87.30	10; 130.17
September 30 – October 3, 2009	2009 Junior Grand Prix, Germany	Junior	2; 50.87	4; 76.95	3; 127.82
September 9–12, 2009	2009 Junior Grand Prix, Poland	Junior	4; 46.70	2; 71.99	6; 118.69
2008–09 season
Date	Event	Level	SP	FS	Total
January 28–31, 2009	2009 Russian Junior Championships	Junior	13	5	7; 130.54
