= Ekaterina Pushkash =

Russian ice dancer (born 1992)

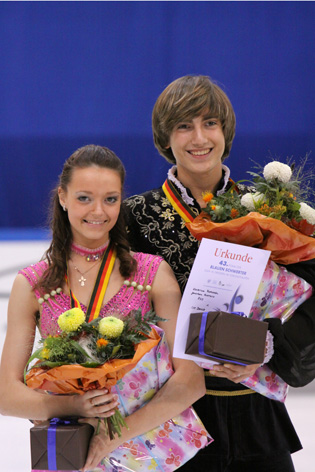
- Pushkash and Guerreiro in 2009.

Personal information
- Full name: Ekaterina Viktorovna Pushkash
- Born: 27 May 1992 (age 34) Nizhny Novgorod, Russia
- Height: 1.70 m (5 ft 7 in)

Figure skating career
- Country: Russia
- Coach: Anjelika Krylova
- Skating club: Vorobievie Gory
- Began skating: 1996
Medal record
Figure skating
Ice dancing
Representing Russia
World Junior Championships
Silver medal – second place	2011 Gangneung	Ice dancing

Ekaterina Viktorovna Pushkash (Russian: Екатерина Викторовна Пушкаш, born 27 May 1992) is a Russian ice dancer. With partner Jonathan Guerreiro, she is the 2011 World Junior silver medalist and 2011 Russian Junior silver medalist.

== Early career ==
Ekaterina Pushkash originally trained in ballroom dancing and took up ice dancing because of her cousin. She teamed up with her maternal first cousin, Dmitri Kiselev, in 2000. They moved from Nizhny Novgorod to Moscow for training in 2002. Pushkash/Kiselev won silver medals at the 2008–2009 ISU Junior Grand Prix event in Gomel, Belarus and at the 2009 Russian Junior Championships. They finished sixth at the 2009 World Junior Championships and parted ways at the end of the season.

== Partnership with Guerreiro ==
=== Junior career ===
Coaches Irina Zhuk and Alexander Svinin suggested she skate with Jonathan Guerreiro. She was reluctant at first, not wishing to cause family problems, but eventually agreed.

She and Jonathan Guerreiro began skating together in May 2009. They finished 5th at the 2009–2010 Junior Grand Prix Final and won the bronze medal at the 2010 Russian Junior Championships. At the end of the season, they switched coaches to Natalia Linichuk and Gennadi Karponossov, which required them to move to Aston, Pennsylvania in the United States.

During the 2010–2011 season, they finished 4th at the JGP Final. At the 2011 Russian Junior Championships, they won the silver medal and were assigned to the World Junior Championships where they won the silver medal.

=== Senior career ===
Pushkash and Guerreiro moved up to the senior level for the 2011–2012 season. Guerreiro fractured his left foot in training in June 2011, causing them to miss a few weeks of training. They competed at two Grand Prix events, 2011 Skate Canada and 2011 Cup of Russia. At the end of the season, they changed coaches to Nikolai Morozov in Moscow.

Prior to the 2013–14 season, Pushkash and Guerreiro began training with Anjelika Krylova and Pasquale Camerlengo in Bloomfield Hills, Michigan.

== Personal life ==
Pushkash and Dmitri Kiselev are first cousins – their mothers are sisters. Her father is a former competitive marathon runner.

== Programs ==
=== With Guerreiro ===
Season	Short dance	Free dance	Exhibition
2013–2014	Show Me How You Burlesque by Christina Aguilera	Somewhere in Time by John Barry performed by Maksim Mrvica	
2012–2013	Quidam: Marelle; Zydeko	Tristan & Iseult by Maxime Rodriguez	
2011–2012	Samba: Conga by Gloria Estefan; Rhumba: La Vuelta by Gizelle D'Cole; Samba: Mujer Latina by Thalía	Capriccio Rhapsody by Niccolò Paganini	
2010–2011	Waltz: Algo pequeñito by Daniel Diges	Scorchio by Tonči Huljić	Bust Your Windows by Jazmine Sullivan
	Original dance		
2009–2010	Russian folk: Barynya	Un Giorno Per Noi (from Romeo and Juliet) by Nino Rota performed by Jonathan Ansell, Hayley Westenra	

=== With Kiselev ===
Season	Original dance	Free dance
2008–2009	Charleston: Unlucky Date (Russian: Неудачное свидание) by Alexander Tsfasman; Ragtime: Tiger Rag	Sheherazade by Nikolai Rimsky-Korsakov performed by Opera Babes
2007–2008	African dance	Carmen by Georges Bizet
2006–2007		7:40

== Competitive highlights ==
=== With Guerreiro ===
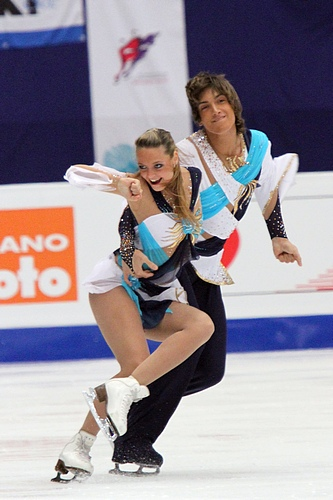
Guerreiro and Pushkash at the 2010–11 JGP Final

Results
International
Event	2009–10	2010–11	2011–12	2012–13	2013–14
GP Bompard				7th	
GP Rostelecom			7th		
GP Skate Canada			6th		
Bavarian Open			2nd	5th	
Crystal Skate				2nd	
Ice Star					3rd
Ondrej Nepela			2nd		9th
Toruń Cup					1st
International: Junior
Junior Worlds		2nd			
JGP Final	5th	4th			
JGP Czech Rep.		1st			
JGP Germany	1st				
JGP Japan		2nd			
JGP Turkey	2nd				
NRW Trophy	1st J.				
National
Russian Champ.			4th	6th	8th
Russian Jr. Champ.	3rd	2nd			
GP = Grand Prix; JGP = Junior Grand Prix; J. = Junior level; WD = Withdrew

=== With Kiselev ===
Results
International: Junior
Event	2005–06	2006–07	2007–08	2008–09
Junior Worlds				6th
JGP Final				5th
JGP Belarus				2nd
JGP Bulgaria			4th	
JGP Estonia			6th	
JGP Great Britain				4th
JGP Taipei		7th		
National
Russian Jr. Champ.	9th	6th	5th	2nd
JGP = Junior Grand Prix
