= Polina Shelepen =

Russian figure skater

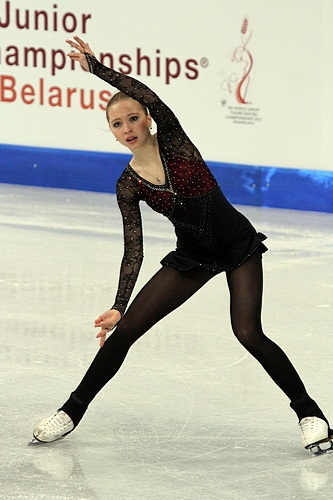
- Shelepen in 2012

Personal information
- Full name: Polina Sergeyevna Shelepen
- Born: 28 July 1995 (age 31) Moscow, Russia
- Height: 1.67 m (5 ft 5 1/2 in)

Figure skating career
- Country: Russia
- Skating club: CSKA Moscow
- Began skating: 1999
- Retired: September 16, 2014
Medal record
Representing Russia
Figure skating: Ladies' singles
Junior Grand Prix Final
Silver medal – second place	2011–12 Quebec	Ladies' singles
Silver medal – second place	2009–10 Tokyo	Ladies' singles

Polina Sergeyevna Shelepen (Russian: Поли́на Серге́евна Ше́лепень; born 28 July 1995) is a retired Russian figure skater. She is a two-time (2009, 2011) JGP Final silver medalist and a two-time (2011, 2012) Russian national junior silver medalist. She competed for Russia through 2012.

== Personal life ==
Polina Shelepen was born 28 July 1995 in Moscow, Russia.

== Career ==
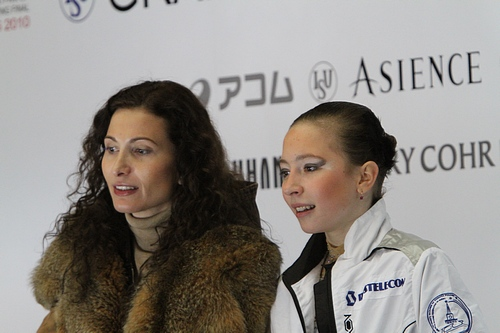
Shelepen with former coach Eteri Tutberidze

Shelepen began skating at the age of four-and-a-half, instructed by her first coach Eteri Tutberidze. She learned her first triple, a Salchow, at eleven years old and would later attempt a quadruple Salchow in practice. In 2011, she told an interviewer that her mother took her to the rink because she "didn't like to go to kindergarten because there everyone had to eat a cream of wheat".

In the 2009–10 season, Shelepen won her two Junior Grand Prix assignments and qualified for the 2009–10 Junior Grand Prix Final where she won silver. She then competed at the 2010 World Junior Championships and finished 4th.

Ahead of the 2010–11 season, Shelepen grew ten cm, resulting in some coordination problems. She won gold at the JGP in France, bronze in the Czech Republic, and finished 5th at the 2010 Junior Grand Prix Final. At the 2011 Russian Championships, Shelepen finished 7th on the senior level and won silver on the junior level. She finished 7th at the 2011 World Junior Championships.

In the 2011–12 season, Shelepen continued on the Junior Grand Prix, winning events in Latvia and Romania to qualify for the 2011–12 Junior Grand Prix Final. She won the silver medal at the Final. At the 2012 Russian Championships, she finished 10th on the senior level and won another silver medal on the junior level. Originally the first alternate for the 2012 World Junior Championships, Shelepen was named to replace Elizaveta Tuktamysheva, who withdrew from the competition. At the event, Shelepen ranked 12th in the short program and 4th in the free skate, finishing 6th overall.

In July 2012, Shelepen parted ways from her long-time coach Eteri Tutberidze and began training at the CSKA Moscow ice rink with Svetlana Sokolovskaya. She finished 5th at the 2012 Nebelhorn Trophy and 10th at her first senior Grand Prix assignment, the 2012 Skate Canada. In November, Shelepen withdrew from the 2012 NHK Trophy due to worsening of a long-standing ankle injury. She resumed training in December and competed at the 2012 Golden Spin of Zagreb, finishing 5th. She later withdrew from the 2013 Russian Championships.

On March 23, 2013, Sokolovskaya confirmed that Shelepen had received her Israeli passport and wished to compete for Israel. The Russian skating federation released Shelepen in May 2013. Before she may compete internationally, the International Skating Union requires that she sit out a certain period of time according to the rules for single skaters.

On September 16, 2014, Shelepen announced that she had decided to retire from competitive figure skating and had moved back to Moscow after living in Israel for a year to acquire Israeli citizenship. She stated that the reason for her decision was due to an ankle injury she had been plagued with during the 2012–2013 season and Shelepen had to undergo surgery during her time in Israel. After returning to Russia, Shelepen began coaching younger skaters at the CSKA Moscow with her coach, Svetlana Sokolovskaya, and said that she plans to enroll in the Russian State University of Physical Education to get a license for professional coaching.

== Programs ==
Season	Short program	Free skating	Exhibition
2012–2013	Latin medley; Autumn Leaves by Roger Williams	Gone with the Wind	
2011–2012	Marco Polo by Ennio Morricone	Violin Concerto by Felix Mendelssohn	
2010–2011	Swan Lake (remix version) by Pyotr Ilyich Tchaikovsky	Korobeiniki (Russian folk music)	Ain't No Other Man by Christina Aguilera
2009–2010	Michael Jackson medley by Edvin Marton; Adagio in G minor by Tomaso Albinoni	Polovtsian Dances (from Prince Igor) by Alexander Borodin	Ain't No Other Man by Christina Aguilera
2008–2009	Fireworks by Edvin Marton	Love in Venice by Edvin Marton	

== Competitive highlights ==
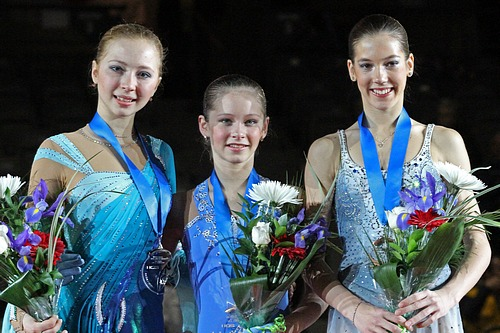
Shelepen at the 2011–12 Junior Grand Prix Final.

GP: Grand Prix; JGP: Junior Grand Prix

International
Event	07–08	08–09	09–10	10–11	11–12	12–13
GP NHK Trophy						WD
GP Skate Canada						10th
Nebelhorn Trophy						5th
Golden Spin						5th
Ice Star						1st
International: Junior
World Junior Champ.			4th	7th	6th	
JGP Final			2nd	5th	2nd	
JGP Belarus			1st			
JGP Czech Republic				3rd		
JGP France				1st		
JGP Hungary			1st			
JGP Latvia					1st	
JGP Romania					1st	
National
Russian Champ.		6th		7th	10th	WD
Russian Junior Champ.	3rd	4th	3rd	2nd	2nd	
WD = Withdrew

== Detailed results ==
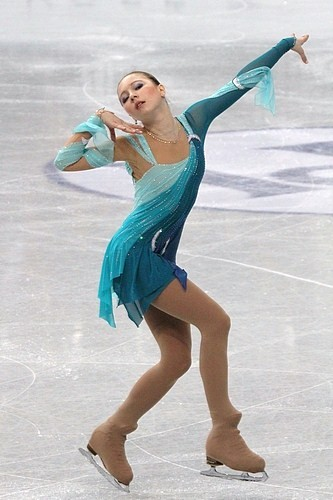
Shelepen at the 2012 World Junior Championships

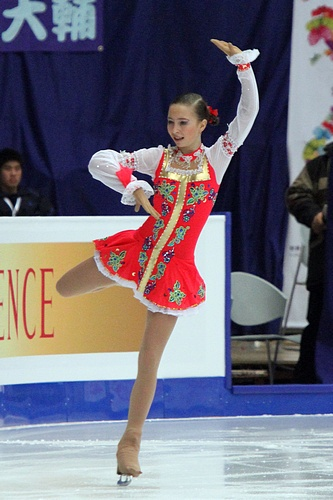
Shelepen at the 2010–11 JGP Final

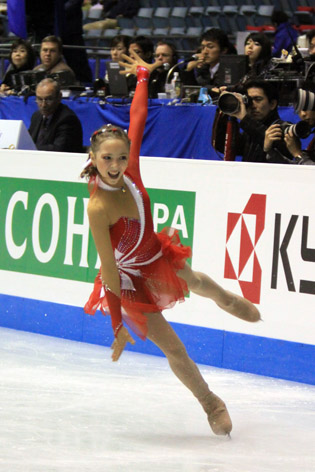
Shelepen at the 2009–10 JGP Final

(Small medals for short and free programs awarded only at ISU Championships.)

2012–2013 season
Date	Event	Level	SP	FS	Result
13–16 December 2012	2012 Golden Spin of Zagreb	Senior	3; 47.84	7; 80.32	5; 128.16
26–28 October 2012	2012 Skate Canada	Senior	10; 46.18	10; 78.11	10; 124.29
27–29 September 2012	2012 Nebelhorn Trophy	Senior	4; 53.63	6; 93.96	5; 147.59
7–9 September 2012	2012 Ice Star	Senior	1; 51.52	1; 90.19	1; 141.71
2011–2012 season
Date	Event	Level	SP	FS	Result
27 Feb. – 4 March 2012	2012 World Junior Championships	Junior	12; 47.99	4; 108.03	6; 156.02
5–7 February 2012	2012 Russian Junior Championships	Junior	2; 61.93	3; 120.61	2; 182.54
25–29 December 2011	2012 Russian Championships	Senior	17; 45.44	7; 109.34	10; 154.78
8–11 December 2011	2011 Junior Grand Prix Final	Junior	2; 54.99	2; 107.35	2; 162.34
21–24 September 2011	2011 Junior Grand Prix, Romania	Junior	1; 50.63	1; 106.98	1; 157.61
31 Aug. – 3 Sep. 2011	2011 Junior Grand Prix, Latvia	Junior	5; 47.92	1; 105.48	1; 153.40
2010–2011 season
Date	Event	Level	SP	FS	Result
28 Feb. – 6 March 2011	2011 World Junior Championships	Junior	4; 56.58	8; 93.35	7; 149.93
2–4 February 2011	2011 Russian Junior Championships	Junior	2; 60.31	3; 114.02	2; 174.33
26–29 December 2010	2011 Russian Championships	Senior	9; 53.89	7; 105.14	7; 159.03
9–12 December 2010	2010–11 Junior Grand Prix Final	Junior	3; 53.26	6; 94.11	5; 147.37
13–17 October 2010	2010 Junior Grand Prix, Czech Republic	Junior	2; 50.46	3; 102.46	3; 152.92
25–28 August 2010	2010 Junior Grand Prix, France	Junior	2; 48.11	1; 103.31	1; 151.42
2009-2010 season
Date	Event	Level	SP	FS	Result
8–14 March 2010	2010 World Junior Championships	Junior	7; 51.42	3; 100.23	4; 151.65
3–6 February 2010	2010 Russian Junior Championships	Junior	10; 53.49	3; 105.85	3; 159.34
3–6 December 2009	2009–10 Junior Grand Prix Final	Junior	1; 59.54	2; 99.75	2; 159.29
23–27 September 2009	2009 Junior Grand Prix, Belarus	Junior	1; 49.65	1; 101.43	1; 151.08
26–30 August 2009	2009 Junior Grand Prix, Hungary	Junior	1; 54.84	1; 102.73	1; 157.57
2008-2009 season
Date	Event	Level	SP	FS	Result
28–31 January 2009	2009 Russian Junior Championships	Junior	7; 47.25	4; 95.15	4; 142.40
24–28 December 2008	2009 Russian Championships	Senior	9	4	6; 142.34
