= Alexandra Vasilieva =

Russian former competitive pair skater (born 1995)

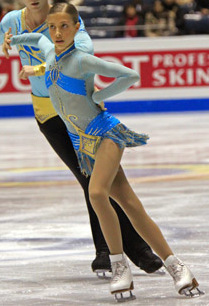
- Alexandra Vasilieva at the 2009 Junior Grand Prix Final

Personal information
- Full name: Alexandra Dmitrievna Vasilieva
- Born: 17 October 1995 (age 30) Saint Petersburg
- Height: 1.59 m (5 ft 2 1/2 in)

Figure skating career
- Country: Russia
- Skating club: Yubileyny
- Began skating: 2001

Alexandra Dmitrievna Vasilieva (Russian: Александра Дмитриевна Васильева; born 17 October 1995) is a Russian former competitive pair skater. With former partner Yuri Shevchuk, she is the 2011 Russian Junior silver medalist and placed 11th at the 2011 World Junior Championships. The pair began skating together in May 2008 and were coached by Artur Dmitriev in Saint Petersburg. In March 2012, it was confirmed that Vasilieva/Shevchuk had ended their partnership.

== Programs ==
(with Shevchuk)

| Season | Short program | Free skating |
|---|---|---|
| 2010–2011 | Chess (musical soundtrack) by Björn Ulvaeus, Benny Andersson | Song from a Secret Garden by Secret Garden |

== Competitive highlights ==
(with Shevchuk)

Results
International
| Event | 2009–10 | 2010–11 | 2011–12 |
|---|---|---|---|
| World Junior Championships | | 11th | |
| JGP Final | 8th | | |
| JGP Austria | | | 9th |
| JGP Belarus | 4th | | |
| JGP Great Britain | | 9th | |
| JGP Poland | 4th | | |
International
| Russian Junior Champ. | | 2nd | 7th |
JGP = Junior Grand Prix
