= Vladislav Sesganov =

Russian figure skater

Personal information
- Native name: Владислав Дмитриевич Сезганов
- Full name: Vladislav Dmitriyevich Sezganov
- Born: 3 July 1988 (age 38) Samara, Russian SFSR, Soviet Union
- Height: 1.83 m (6 ft 0 in)

Figure skating career
- Country: Russia
- Retired: August 6, 2014

Vladislav Dmitriyevich Sezganov or Sesganov (Russian: Владислав Дмитриевич Сезганов; born 3 July 1988) is a Russian former competitive figure skater. He is the 2012 Golden Spin of Zagreb and 2011 Gardena Spring Trophy champion.

Sesganov is the first European skater to have landed a quadruple lutz jump in a sanctioned competition. He has also practiced quad lutz - triple toe loop combination.

On August 6, 2014, Sesganov announced his retirement from competitive figure skating.

== Competitive highlights ==
International
Event	2010–11	2011–12	2012–13	2013–14
Cup of Nice			7th	5th
Gardena Spring Trophy		1st	2nd	
Golden Spin of Zagreb		7th	1st	
Ice Challenge				5th
National
Russian Championships	10th	17th	6th	16th
