= Yuri Shevchuk (figure skater) =

Russian pair skater (born 1990)

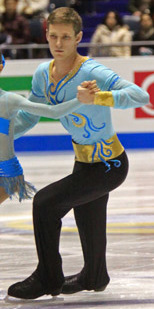
- Yuri Shevchuk at the 2009 Junior Grand Prix Final

Personal information
- Full name: Yuri Mikhailovich Shevchuk
- Born: 27 August 1990 (age 35) Saint Petersburg
- Height: 1.86 m (6 ft 1 in)

Figure skating career
- Country: Russia
- Partner: Natalia Mitina
- Coach: Artur Dmitriev; Natalia Pavlova
- Began skating: 1996

Yuri Mikhailovich Shevchuk (Russian: Юрий Михайлович Шевчук; born 27 August 1990) is a Russian pair skater. With former partner Alexandra Vasilieva, he is the 2011 Russian Junior silver medalist and placed 11th at the 2011 World Junior Championships. The pair began skating together in May 2008 and were coached by Artur Dmitriev in Saint Petersburg. In March 2012, it was confirmed that Vasilieva/Shevchuk had ended their partnership and he had teamed up with Natalia Mitina. Mitina/Shevchuk are coached by Dmitriev and Natalia Pavlova in Moscow. They placed fourth at the 2013 Winter Universiade.

== Programs ==
(with Vasilieva)

Season	Short program	Free skating
2010–2011	Chess (musical soundtrack) by Björn Ulvaeus, Benny Andersson	Song from a Secret Garden by Secret Garden

== Competitive highlights ==
=== With Mitina ===
Results
International
Event	2013–2014
Winter Universiade	4th

=== With Vasilieva ===
Results
International
Event	2009–10	2010–11	2011–12
World Junior Championships		11th	
JGP Final	8th		
JGP Austria			9th
JGP Belarus	4th		
JGP Great Britain		9th	
JGP Poland	4th		
International
Russian Junior Champ.		2nd	7th
JGP = Junior Grand Prix
