= Figure skating at the 2014 Winter Olympics – Women's singles =

Women's singles at the XXII Olympic Winter Games
- Venue: Iceberg Skating Palace; Sochi, Russia
- Dates: 19–20 February 2014
- Competitors: 30 from 20 nations
- Winning score: 224.59 points

Medalists
1st place, gold medalist(s)		Adelina Sotnikova	Russia
2nd place, silver medalist(s)		Yuna Kim	South Korea
3rd place, bronze medalist(s)		Carolina Kostner	Italy

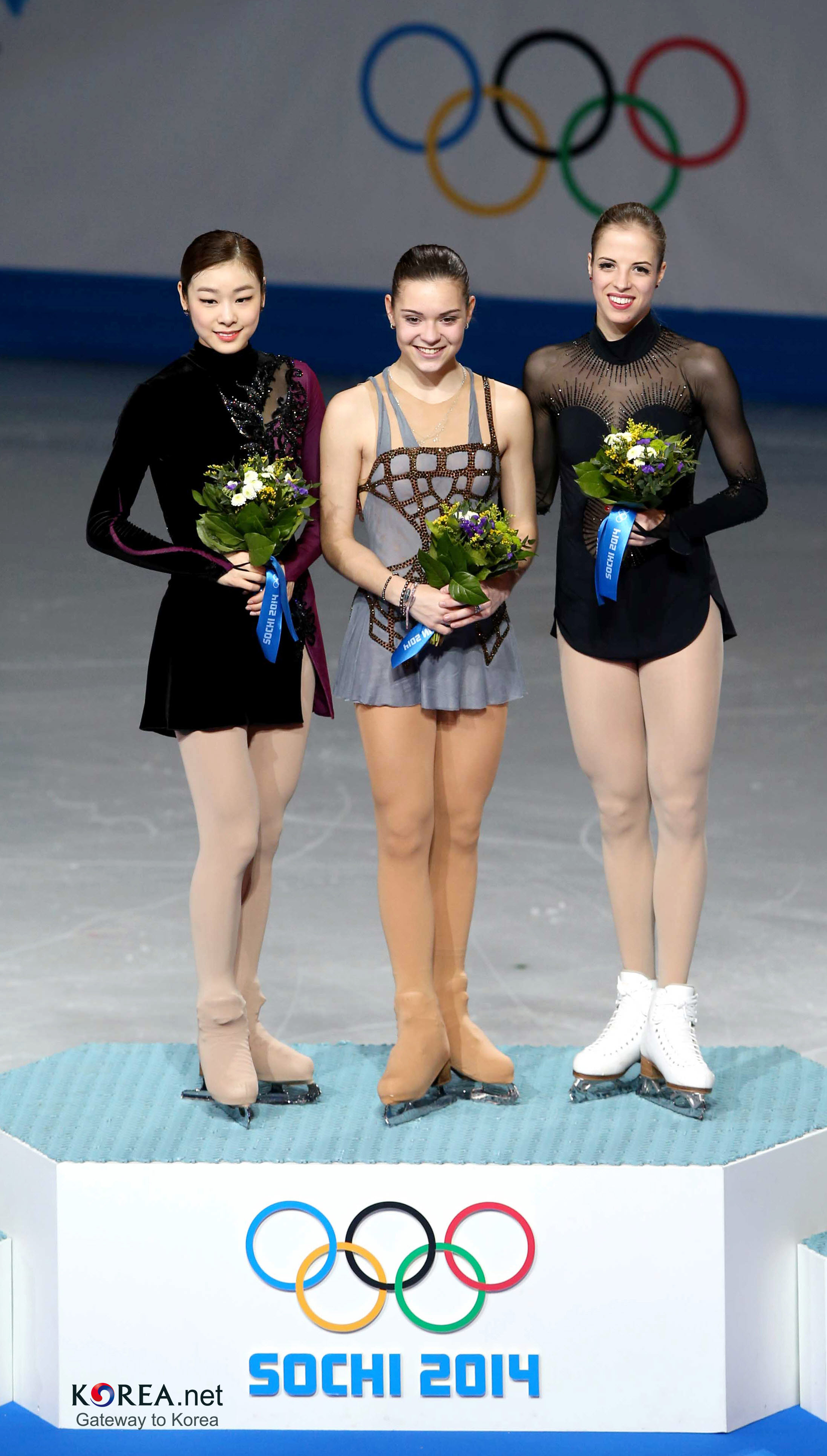
The medalists from the women's event at the 2014 Winter Olympics (from left to right): Yuna Kim of South Korea (silver), Adelina Sotnikova of Russia (gold), and Carolina Kostner of Italy (bronze)

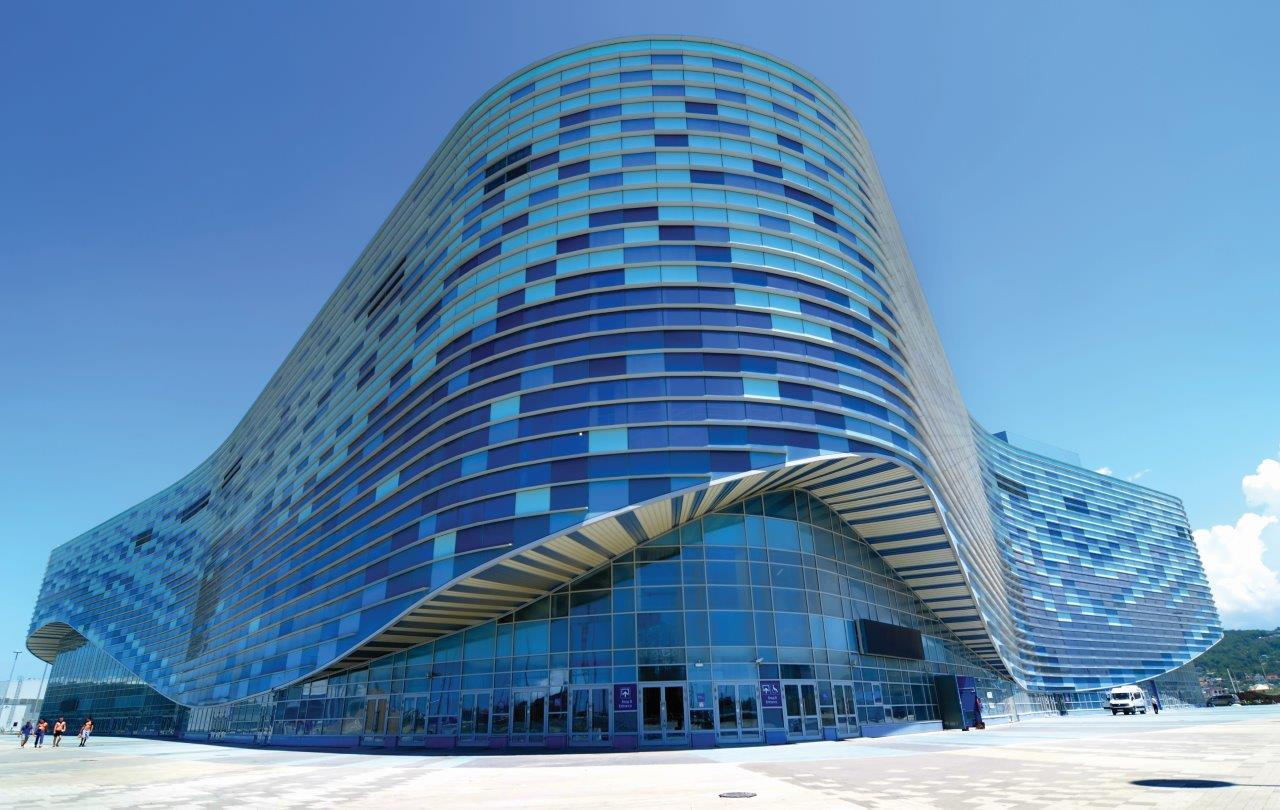
The figure skating events at the 2014 Winter Olympics were held at the Iceberg Skating Palace in Sochi, Russia.

The women's singles figure skating competition at the 2014 Winter Olympics was held on 19 and 20 February 2014 at the Iceberg Skating Palace in Sochi, Russia, and featured 30 skaters from 20 nations. Adelina Sotnikova of Russia won the gold medal, Yuna Kim of South Korea won the silver medal, and Carolina Kostner of Italy won the bronze medal. Sotnikova's Olympic gold medal was the first for Russia in the women's event, and Russia became the first country to win gold medals in all of the Olympic figure skating events. Kostner's bronze medal was the first Olympic medal for Italy in single skating. Controversy arose upon completion of the women's event when an examination of the scores led to accusations of judging irregularities and improprieties.

== Background ==
The women's single skating event was one of five figure skating competitions contested at the 2014 Winter Olympics in Sochi, Russia. It was held at the Iceberg Skating Palace over two days: the short program took place on 19 February and the free skating on 20 February. The competition featured 30 skaters representing 20 nations. Yuna Kim of South Korea, the gold medalist from the 2010 Winter Olympics, was considered the front-runner for the Olympic gold medal in 2014. Only twice before had a skater won back-to-back Olympic gold medals in the women's individual event: Sonja Henie of Norway and Katarina Witt of East Germany. Kim had missed the entire 2010–11 season save the 2011 World Championships, and then the entire 2011–12 season. She won the 2013 World Figure Skating Championships by over twenty points. However, Kim had missed six weeks of training earlier in the season after injuring her foot, and only competed at the 2013 Golden Spin of Zagreb and the 2014 South Korean Championships prior to the World Championships. In addition to the gold medal at the 2010 Winter Olympics and her victory at the 2013 World Championships, Kim also won the 2009 World Championships and 2009 Four Continents Championships, and was a three-time Grand Prix of Figure Skating Final champion and ten-time South Korean national champion.

Mao Asada of Japan had been considered a front-runner for the gold medal at the 2010 Winter Olympics because of her artistry and her ability to perform a triple Axel, which was a rare maneuver for women. However, Asada had difficulty with her jumps after the Olympics, and after her mother died in 2011, she considered retiring from skating. She ultimately decided to make another attempt at an Olympic gold medal in tribute to her mother. In December, Asada won the 2013–14 Grand Prix of Figure Skating Final. In addition to her silver medal from the 2010 Winter Olympics, Asada was a two-time world champion, three-time Four Continents champion, four-time Grand Prix Final champion (including the aforementioned victory in 2013), and six-time Japanese national champion.

Also expected to be a contender for an Olympic medal was Gracie Gold of the United States. At the 2010 Winter Olympics, an American skater failed to win a medal in the women's individual event for the first time since 1964. Gold had recently won the 2014 U.S. Championships. Also competing on behalf of the United States was Ashley Wagner, a two-time U.S. national champion; however, Wagner had finished fourth at the 2014 U.S. Championships, but was chosen for the Olympic team over bronze medalist Mirai Nagasu because of her otherwise strong competitive history. Also considered a strong Olympic contender was Yulia Lipnitskaya of Russia, who had recently won the 2014 European Championships.

== Qualification ==
Twenty-four quota spots in the women's event were awarded based on the results at the 2013 World Figure Skating Championships. An additional six quota spots were earned at the 2013 Nebelhorn Trophy. This was Brazil's first qualification for a figure skating event at the Winter Olympics; the Brazilian Olympic Committee chose to send Isadora Williams.

Qualifying nations in women's singles
Event	Skaters per NOC	Qualifying NOCs	Total skaters
2013 World Championships	3	South Korea; Japan; United States	24
2013 World Championships	2	Italy; China; Canada; Russia	24
2013 World Championships	1	France; Sweden; Ukraine; Estonia; Slovakia; Germany; Great Britain	24
2013 Nebelhorn Trophy	1	Australia; Georgia; Norway; Austria; Czech Republic; Brazil	6
Total			30

== Required performance elements ==
Women performed their short programs on 19 February. Lasting 2 minutes 50 seconds, the short program had to include the following elements: one double or triple Axel; one triple jump immediately preceded by connecting steps; one jump combination consisting of a double jump and a triple jump, or two triple jumps; one layback spin or sideways leaning spin; one spin combination with a change of foot; and a step sequence using the full ice surface.

The twenty-four highest-scoring skaters after the short program advanced to the free skating, which they performed on 20 February. Lasting 4 minutes (+/− 10 seconds), the free skate had to include the following: seven jump elements, of which one had to be an Axel-type jump; three spins, of which one had to be a spin combination, one a flying spin, and one a spin with only one position; a step sequence; and a choreographic sequence.

== Judging ==
Skaters were judged according to the required technical elements of their program (such as jumps and spins), as well as the overall presentation of their program, based on five program components (skating skills, transitions, performance/execution, composition/choreography, and musical interpretation). Each technical element in a figure skating performance was assigned a predetermined base point value and scored by a panel of nine judges on a scale from −3 to +3 based on the quality of its execution. Each Grade of Execution (GOE) from –3 to +3 was assigned a value as indicated on the Scale of Values. For example, a triple Axel was worth a base value of 8.50 points, and a GOE of +3 was worth 3.00 points, so a triple Axel with a GOE of +3 earned 11.50 points. The judging panel's GOE for each element was determined by calculating the trimmed mean (the average after discarding the highest and lowest scores). The panel's scores for all elements were added together to generate a Total Elements Score. At the same time, the judges evaluated each performance based on the five aforementioned program components and assigned each a score from 0.25 to 10 in 0.25-point increments. The judging panel's final score for each program component was also determined by calculating the trimmed mean. Those scores were then multiplied by the factor shown on the chart below; the results were added together to generate a total Program Component Score.

Program component factoring
Component	Short program	Free skating
Women's singles	0.80	1.60

Deductions were applied for certain violations, such as time infractions or falls. The Total Elements Score and Program Component Score were then added together, minus any deductions, to generate a final performance score for each skater or team.

== Results ==
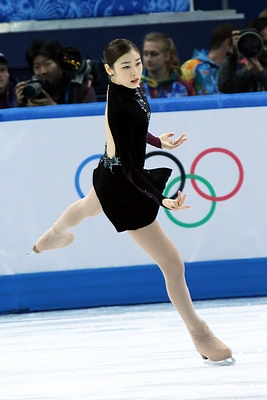
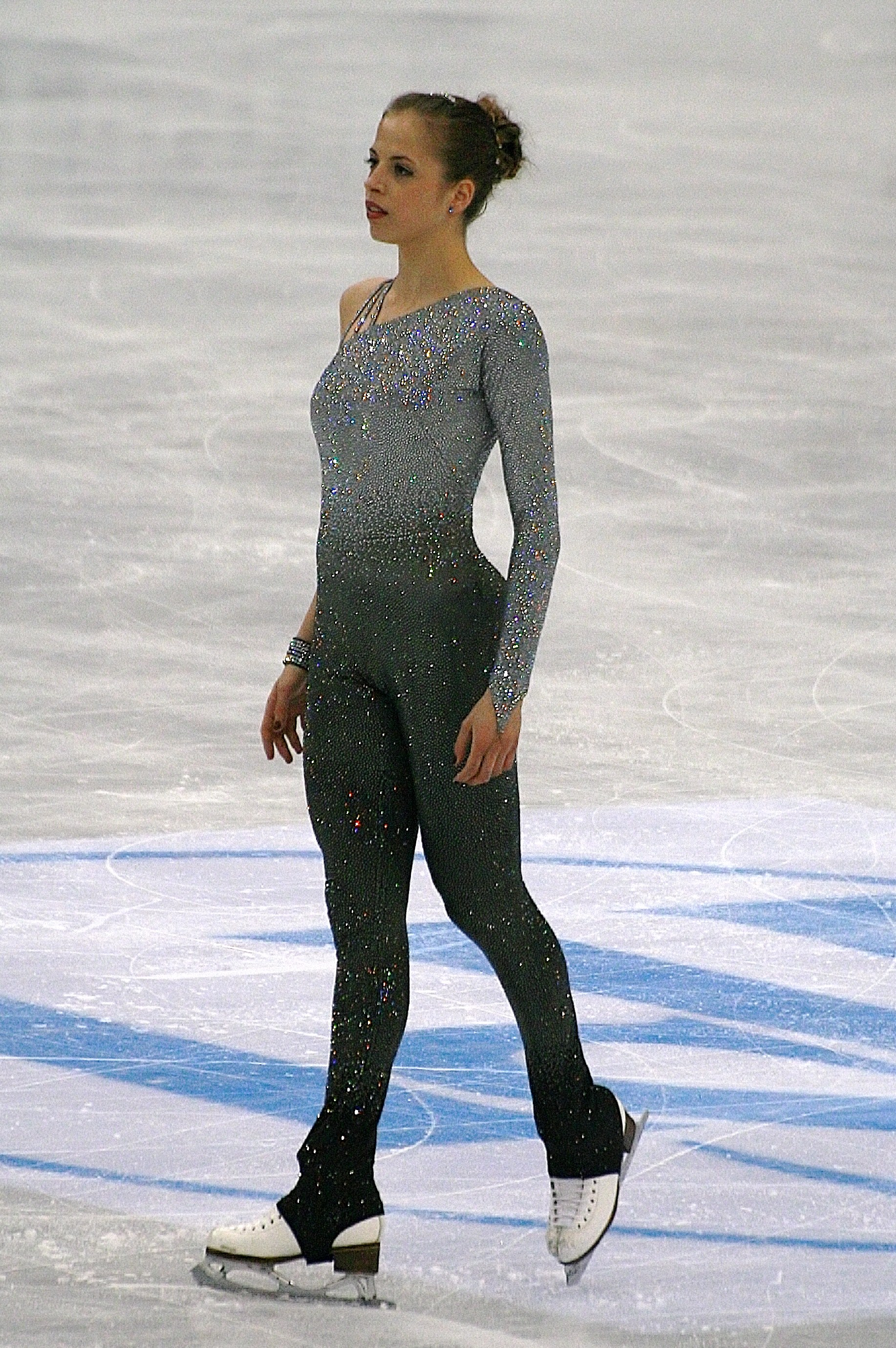
The gold, silver, and bronze medalists from the women's event at the 2014 Winter Olympics (from left to right):
Adelina Sotnikova of Russia (gold), Yuna Kim of South Korea (silver), and Carolina Kostner of Italy (bronze)

Code key

- TSS – Total Segment Score
- TES – Total Elements Score
- PCS – Program Component Score
- SS – Skating skills
- TR – Transitions
- PE – Performance
- CO – Composition
- IN – Musical interpretation
- DED – Deductions

=== Short program ===
The women's short program was held on 19 February. Yuna Kim of South Korea finished in first place with her routine set to "Send In the Clowns" by Stephen Sondheim. Jeré Longman of The New York Times described her performance as "mature and elegant", though not quite on par with her short program from the 2010 Winter Olympics. Michelle Kaufman of the Miami Herald likened her to a "prima ballerina floating on the ice ... quiet and light as a feather". Kim received high scores for her triple Lutz-triple toe loop jump combination, but scored lower for her step sequence and layback spin. Her score of 74.95 was roughly 3.5 points lower than the score she received at the 2010 Winter Olympics.

Adelina Sotnikova of Russia finished in second place with a routine set to music from Carmen, while Carolina Kostner of Italy finished in third place with what Longman called a "poised and graceful" performance to "Ave Maria". Kostner, a five-time European champion, called it "a prayer to everything [she'd] learned through skating". Sotnikova received a higher Total Elements Score than Kim, while Kostner received a higher Program Component Score. Kostner unexpectedly swapped out her opening triple toe loop-triple toe loop jump combination for a more difficult triple flip-triple toe loop combination. Less than one point separated the top three skaters. Gracie Gold of the United States finished in fourth place after some imprecise jumps – Kaufman described them as "wobbly" – while Yulia Lipnitskaya of Russia fell on her triple flip and ended in fifth place. Mao Asada of Japan fell on her triple Axel and had an overall disastrous performance, ultimately finishing in sixteenth place.

Women's short program results
Pl.	Skater	Nation	TSS	TES	PCS	SS	TR	PE	CO	IN	DED
1	Yuna Kim	South Korea	74.92	39.03	35.89	9.04	8.61	9.11	8.89	9.21	0.00
2	Adelina Sotnikova	Russia	74.64	39.09	35.55	8.82	8.57	9.11	8.89	9.04	0.00
3	Carolina Kostner	Italy	74.12	37.49	36.63	9.00	8.79	9.36	9.25	9.39	0.00
4	Gracie Gold	United States	68.63	36.55	32.08	8.04	7.71	8.14	8.04	8.18	0.00
5	Yulia Lipnitskaya	Russia	65.23	33.15	33.08	8.43	8.07	8.14	8.43	8.29	1.00
6	Ashley Wagner	United States	65.21	31.43	33.78	8.39	8.11	8.61	8.50	8.61	0.00
7	Polina Edmunds	United States	61.04	32.98	28.06	7.11	6.71	7.21	6.93	7.11	0.00
8	Akiko Suzuki	Japan	60.97	28.71	32.26	8.18	7.79	8.00	8.11	8.25	0.00
9	Maé-Bérénice Méité	France	58.63	30.83	27.80	7.07	6.64	7.04	6.93	7.07	0.00
10	Nathalie Weinzierl	Germany	57.63	31.94	25.69	6.50	6.14	6.57	6.36	6.54	0.00
11	Li Zijun	China	57.55	30.01	27.54	7.07	6.57	6.96	6.89	6.93	0.00
12	Valentina Marchei	Italy	57.02	27.52	29.50	7.32	7.04	7.54	7.36	7.61	0.00
13	Kaetlyn Osmond	Canada	56.18	27.51	28.67	7.18	6.96	7.18	7.14	7.39	0.00
14	Zhang Kexin	China	55.80	32.68	23.12	6.11	5.61	5.79	5.75	5.64	0.00
15	Kanako Murakami	Japan	55.60	26.72	28.88	7.39	6.93	7.25	7.21	7.32	0.00
16	Mao Asada	Japan	55.51	22.63	33.88	8.57	8.29	8.14	8.64	8.71	1.00
17	Elene Gedevanishvili	Georgia	54.70	27.51	27.19	6.89	6.50	6.89	6.71	7.00	0.00
18	Kim Hae-jin	South Korea	54.37	29.23	25.14	6.54	5.89	6.39	6.11	6.50	0.00
19	Gabrielle Daleman	Canada	52.61	28.07	24.54	6.32	5.93	6.11	6.14	6.18	0.00
20	Elizaveta Ukolova	Czech Republic	51.87	29.72	22.15	5.64	5.32	5.61	5.61	5.50	0.00
21	Nicole Rajičová	Slovakia	49.80	26.63	23.17	5.89	5.50	5.93	5.79	5.86	0.00
22	Brooklee Han	Australia	49.32	26.37	22.95	5.82	5.54	5.86	5.68	5.79	0.00
23	Park So-youn	South Korea	49.14	25.35	23.79	6.14	5.68	6.00	5.89	6.04	0.00
24	Anne Line Gjersem	Norway	48.56	26.13	22.43	5.68	5.36	5.71	5.50	5.79	0.00
25	Jenna McCorkell	Great Britain	48.34	25.34	23.00	5.89	5.36	6.04	5.71	5.75	0.00
26	Kerstin Frank	Austria	48.00	26.64	21.36	5.61	5.14	5.39	5.39	5.18	0.00
27	Viktoria Helgesson	Sweden	47.84	21.83	27.01	7.11	6.57	6.50	6.82	6.75	1.00
28	Natalia Popova	Ukraine	47.42	24.30	23.12	6.00	5.54	5.82	5.82	5.71	0.00
29	Jelena Glebova	Estonia	46.19	22.59	23.60	6.11	5.75	5.89	5.89	5.86	0.00
30	Isadora Williams	Brazil	40.37	18.93	21.44	5.39	5.14	5.39	5.39	5.50	0.00

=== Free skating ===
The women's free skating was held on 20 February. With a free skate set to Introduction and Rondo Capriccioso by Camille Saint-Saëns, Adelina Sotnikova defeated Yuna Kim to win the gold medal. Sotnikova's gold medal was the first for Russia in the women's individual event. Russia also became the first nation to win gold medals in all of the Olympic figure skating disciplines. Russian skaters won three gold medals at the 2014 Winter Olympics by this point: in the women's event, the pairs' event, and the team event. Sotnikova cited being left out of the team event (in lieu of Yulia Lipnitskaya) as an incentive to excel in the individual event. While both Sotnikova and Kim performed what Barry Wilner of the Associated Press described as "flawless programs", Sotnikova performed one more triple jump than Kim. Sotnikova's score of 149.95 in the free skate was a new personal best score.

Performing to Adiós Nonino by Astor Piazzolla, Kim successfully landed six triple jumps, including a triple Lutz-triple toe loop jump combination. Kim's artistry could not make up the difference. Kim had previously announced that she would retire upon completion of the Olympic free skate. "The most important thing for me is to participate in this Olympic Winter Games. It's my last competition", Kim stated afterward. "The result was good because I made no mistakes." Carolina Kostner won the bronze medal with a free skate set to Boléro. Her score of 142.61 was a new season's best. Wilner wrote that Kostner "owned the music" from beginning to end. Her bronze medal was the first for an Italian skater in individual skating. "This medal is absolutely worth gold," Kostner stated. "I will cherish it in my heart."

Gracie Gold finished in fourth place and Yulia Lipnitskaya finished in fifth. Mao Asada, who ended the short program in sixteenth place, performed a brilliant routine to Piano Concerto No. 1 by Sergei Rachmaninoff and finished the free skate in third place. Asada had also announced that she would retire at the end of the season, though she still planned to complete at the 2014 World Championships. Asada was the only woman in the individual event with a triple Axel in her repertoire, though she omitted it from her short program. After Yoshirō Mori, the former Prime Minister of Japan who had recently been named head of the Tokyo Organizing Committee for the 2020 Summer Olympics, criticized her in the press for choking in the team event and the short program, Asada successfully nailed her opening triple Axel and then unleashed a barrage of triple jumps and combinations. "I may not be able to bring back an Olympic medal to Japan," Asada stated afterward, "but I feel like I had the best performance I possibly could." Asada ultimately finished the competition in sixth place.

Women's free skate results
Pl.	Skater	Nation	TSS	TES	PCS	SS	TR	PE	CO	IN	DED
1	Adelina Sotnikova	Russia	149.95	75.54	74.41	9.18	8.96	9.43	9.50	9.43	0.00
2	Yuna Kim	South Korea	144.19	69.69	74.50	9.21	8.96	9.43	9.39	9.57	0.00
3	Mao Asada	Japan	142.71	73.03	69.68	8.75	8.36	8.79	8.79	8.86	0.00
4	Carolina Kostner	Italy	142.61	68.84	73.77	9.14	8.71	9.43	9.21	9.61	0.00
5	Gracie Gold	United States	136.90	69.57	68.33	8.57	8.25	8.61	8.64	8.64	1.00
6	Yulia Lipnitskaya	Russia	135.34	66.28	70.06	8.68	8.46	8.68	9.00	8.96	1.00
7	Ashley Wagner	United States	127.99	61.07	66.92	8.46	8.07	8.50	8.36	8.43	0.00
8	Akiko Suzuki	Japan	125.35	60.57	65.78	8.36	7.82	8.21	8.29	8.43	1.00
9	Polina Edmunds	United States	122.21	63.02	60.19	7.54	7.29	7.57	7.61	7.61	1.00
10	Valentina Marchei	Italy	116.31	55.56	60.75	7.46	7.18	7.75	7.71	7.86	0.00
11	Maé-Bérénice Méité	France	115.90	60.86	56.04	7.11	6.57	7.14	7.07	7.14	1.00
12	Kanako Murakami	Japan	115.38	56.96	58.42	7.54	6.93	7.36	7.32	7.36	0.00
13	Kaetlyn Osmond	Canada	112.80	55.97	57.83	7.25	6.96	7.32	7.25	7.36	1.00
14	Li Zijun	China	110.75	55.79	54.96	7.04	6.57	6.82	6.96	6.96	0.00
15	Zhang Kexin	China	98.41	49.84	48.57	6.43	5.71	6.11	6.14	5.96	0.00
16	Gabrielle Daleman	Canada	95.83	48.40	47.43	6.11	5.75	5.82	6.00	5.96	0.00
17	Kim Hae-jin	South Korea	95.11	45.25	50.86	6.61	6.07	6.29	6.50	6.32	1.00
18	Brooklee Han	Australia	94.52	48.71	46.81	6.00	5.43	5.96	5.86	6.00	1.00
19	Park So-youn	South Korea	93.83	48.72	46.11	6.04	5.50	5.82	5.75	5.71	1.00
20	Elene Gedevanishvili	Georgia	92.45	39.85	53.60	6.93	6.32	6.75	6.75	6.75	1.00
21	Nathalie Weinzierl	Germany	89.73	38.47	52.26	6.71	6.39	6.46	6.64	6.46	1.00
22	Anne Line Gjersem	Norway	85.98	41.24	44.74	5.64	5.32	5.61	5.71	5.68	0.00
23	Elizaveta Ukolova	Czech Republic	84.55	42.94	43.61	5.61	5.29	5.29	5.68	5.39	2.00
24	Nicole Rajičová	Slovakia	75.20	30.39	45.81	5.82	5.54	5.50	5.89	5.89	1.00

=== Overall ===
Women's results
Rank	Skater	Nation	Total	SP		FS	
1st place, gold medalist(s)	Adelina Sotnikova	Russia	224.59	2	74.64	1	149.95
2nd place, silver medalist(s)	Yuna Kim	South Korea	219.11	1	74.92	2	144.19
3rd place, bronze medalist(s)	Carolina Kostner	Italy	216.73	3	74.12	4	142.61
4	Gracie Gold	United States	205.53	4	68.63	5	136.90
5	Yulia Lipnitskaya	Russia	200.57	5	65.23	6	135.34
6	Mao Asada	Japan	198.22	16	55.51	3	142.71
7	Ashley Wagner	United States	193.20	6	65.21	7	127.99
8	Akiko Suzuki	Japan	186.32	8	60.97	8	125.35
9	Polina Edmunds	United States	183.25	7	61.04	9	122.21
10	Maé-Bérénice Méité	France	174.53	9	58.63	11	115.90
11	Valentina Marchei	Italy	173.33	12	57.02	10	116.31
12	Kanako Murakami	Japan	170.98	15	55.60	12	115.38
13	Kaetlyn Osmond	Canada	168.98	13	56.18	13	112.80
14	Li Zijun	China	168.30	11	57.55	14	110.75
15	Zhang Kexin	China	154.21	14	55.80	15	98.41
16	Kim Hae-jin	South Korea	149.48	18	54.37	17	95.11
17	Gabrielle Daleman	Canada	148.44	19	52.61	16	95.83
18	Nathalie Weinzierl	Germany	147.36	10	57.63	21	89.73
19	Elene Gedevanishvili	Georgia	147.15	17	54.70	20	92.45
20	Brooklee Han	Australia	143.84	22	49.32	18	94.52
21	Park So-youn	South Korea	142.97	23	49.14	19	93.83
22	Elizaveta Ukolova	Czech Republic	136.42	20	51.87	23	84.55
23	Anne Line Gjersem	Norway	134.54	24	48.56	22	85.98
24	Nicole Rajičová	Slovakia	125.00	21	49.80	24	75.20
25	Jenna McCorkell	Great Britain	48.34	25	48.34	Did not advance to free skate	
26	Kerstin Frank	Austria	48.00	26	48.00	Did not advance to free skate	
27	Viktoria Helgesson	Sweden	47.84	27	47.84	Did not advance to free skate	
28	Natalia Popova	Ukraine	47.42	28	47.42	Did not advance to free skate	
29	Jelena Glebova	Estonia	46.19	29	46.19	Did not advance to free skate	
30	Isadora Williams	Brazil	40.37	30	40.37	Did not advance to free skate	

== Perception of judging irregularities ==
The gold-medal victory of Adelina Sotnikova of Russia over Yuna Kim of South Korea in the women's event prompted an outpouring of criticism and allegations of unfair judging. Journalists and skating experts argued that scores given to Sotnikova were inflated both in the short program and free skate. Of the three medalists, Sotnikova was the only one to have what Alexander Abad-Santos of The Wire described as an "ugly error". Sotnikova stepped out of a jump combination in a manner described as "sloppy" and "crooked", while only receiving a 0.90-point penalty. Sotnikova also received criticism for her choreography and artistry, which many found lacking compared to that of Yuna Kim, as well as Carolina Kostner, the skater from Italy who won the bronze medal. Dave Lease, figure skating commentator and founder of The Skating Lesson, likened Sotnikova's choreography to that of a sea mammal performing tricks for an audience.

Christine Brennan of USA Today reported that an unnamed Olympic figure skating official alleged that "the geographic makeup of the judging panel 'was clearly slanted towards… Sotnikova.'" The panel of nine judges included four judges from former Eastern Bloc nations (Russia, Ukraine, Estonia, and Slovakia), plus one judge from France, which had earlier conspired with Russia to fix the results of the pair skating event at the 2002 Winter Olympics. Yuri Balkov, the Ukrainian judge, had already served a one-year suspension after he was caught on tape trying to rig the outcome of the ice dance event at the 1998 Winter Olympics, while the Russian judge, Alla Shekhovtsova, was the wife of Valentin Piseev, the then-general director of the Figure Skating Federation of Russia (FSFR). In addition, the technical panel, which is tasked with identifying all of the elements performed as they happen in real time, as well as flagging technical errors and the levels of difficulty performed in different elements, was led by Alexander Lakernik, the then-vice president of the FSFR. In the wake of the judging scandal at the 2002 Winter Olympics, the International Skating Union (ISU) adopted a new system of judging, whereby judges' scores were now posted anonymously, ostensibly to relieve judges from pressures from their federations and other outside influences like those which had corrupted the 2002 pairs' event. However, the result was now that judges' scores could not be scrutinized for malfeasance. Ashley Wagner of the United States, who finished in seventh place, criticized the practice of anonymous judging. "People do not want to watch a sport when they see someone skates lights out and they can't depend on that person to be the one who pulls through," Wagner stated afterward. "They need to get rid of the anonymous judging."

Each technical element in a figure skating performance, like a jump or spin, was scored by the judges on a scale from −3 to +3 based on the quality of its execution; this score was its Grade of Execution (GOE). Adelina Sotnikova's triple Lutz-triple toe loop jump combination, for example, received a −1 GOE from one judge, meaning that judge found the element to be below average, while another judge awarded the same element a 0 GOE, and two other judges awarded it a +1 GOE. Meanwhile, another judge awarded that same jump combination a +3 GOE, which was the highest score possible. While the highest and lowest scores for each element were discarded (by calculating the trimmed mean), unusually high or unusually low scores still had the ability to impact the overall scores. An examination of Yuna Kim and Carolina Kostner's score sheets showed similar irregularities. At this point in time, the world record for the highest score in the women's free skate was 150.06, received by Yuna Kim at the 2010 Winter Olympics, where she won the gold medal. Adelina Sotnikova received a total score of 149.95 in her free skate at the 2014 Winter Olympics. Prior to this, the highest she had ever received for the same program was 131.63, which she had received at the 2014 European Figure Skating Championships roughly three weeks earlier. Even if Sotnikova had had the cleanest skate of her life, journalists and commentators could not see justification for a score increase of over 18 points.

Kurt Browning of Canada, four-time world champion, expressed his surprise at the results, stating that he did not understand how Kim and Sotnikova could have had such close Program Component Scores, as well as how her total score could have soared by more than 18 points in less than a month. While Sotnikova's supporters pointed out that she had performed one more triple jump than Yuna Kim had, explaining the 5.76-point gap between the two, critics responded that Carolina Kostner had performed the same number of triple jumps as Sotnikova, but scored 7.34 points behind her. Dick Button, two-time Olympic gold medalist and longstanding skating analyst, commented: "Sotnikova was energetic, strong, commendable, but not a complete skater." Alexei Mishin, the Russian 1969 world silver medalist and coach to three Olympic champions, said that "Sotnikova's victory [was] absolutely deserved and objective," and claimed that "there [were] people here who [reacted] jealously to Sotnikova's victories".

On 21 February, the ISU issued a statement which asserted that all of the rules and procedures were correctly applied during the competition and that no official protest had been filed by any participating nation concerning the results. The ISU expressed their confidence "in the high quality and integrity of the ISU Judging System", and added that "judges were selected by random drawing from a pool of 13 potential judges" and that all nine judges on the free skating panel were from different nations.

On 10 April, the Korean Olympic Committee (KOC) and the Korea Skating Union (KSU) filed an official complaint with the ISU Disciplinary Commission (DC). The complaint addressed "the wrongful constitution of the panel of judges and the unjust outcome of the competition". It requested that the DC conduct a thorough investigation, "take appropriate disciplinary actions against the concerned individuals", and institute corrective actions. On 14 April, the DC ruled the complaint inadmissible, because a general request for investigation was not within the DC's jurisdiction and the complaint was not addressed to an individual or federation as required. On 30 April, the KOC and KSU filed a second official complaint with the DC, this time against Alla Shekhovtsova and the FSFR, specifically citing photographs of Sotnikova hugging Shekhovtsova which emerged shortly after the end of the women's competition, as well as Shekhovtsova's marriage to the then-general director of the Figure Skating Federation of Russia. On 30 May, the DC dismissed the complaint, ruling that Shekhovtsova was "not responsible for the judging panel's composition", her marriage did not create a conflict of interest, and since Sotnikova was the one who initiated the hug, Shekhovtsova did not break any rules by responding.

== Aftermath ==
The ISU Congress, the highest-ranking body of the International Skating Union, ended the policy of secret judging after the 2014 Winter Olympics. While the ISU stated that the secrecy provided when judges' marks were posted anonymously freed judges from pressure from their federations, critics responded that instead of preventing judges from cheating, the secrecy prevented the public and media from being able to identify cheating. The ISU stated the change was to "increase transparency" in the process.

== Works cited ==
- "International Skating Union – Special Regulations & Technical Rules – Single & Pair Skating and Ice Dance 2012" (PDF). International Skating Union. June 2012. Archived from the original (PDF) on 22 February 2014.
