= Maxim Panyak =

Russian entrepreneur

Maxim Stefanovich Panyak
- Максим Паняк
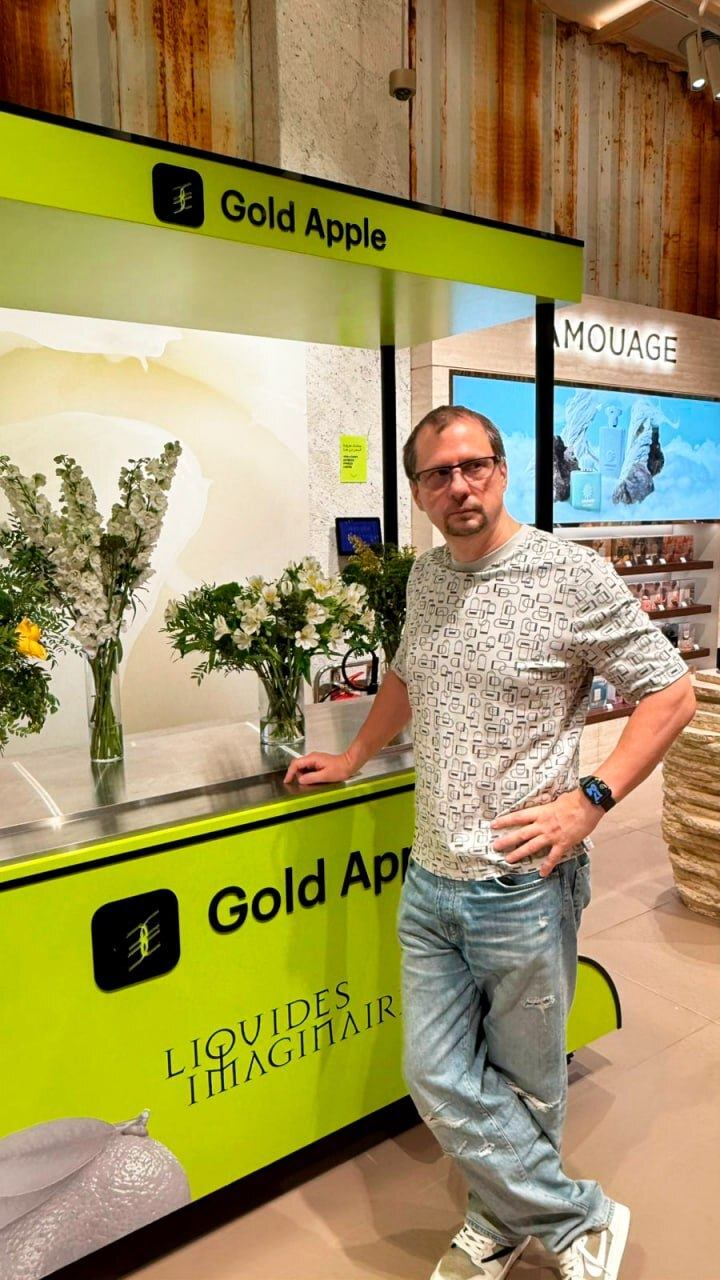
- Born: 15 July 1972 (age 54); Novoalekseevskoe, Pervouralsk District, Sverdlovsk Oblast, Russian SFSR, Soviet Union (now Russia)
- Education: Ural State University of Economics
- Occupation: Co-Owner of Gold Apple
- Children: 3 children

Maxim Stefanovich Panyak (Russian: Максим Стефанович Паняк; born July 15, 1972, in Novoalekseevskoe, Pervouralsk District, Sverdlovsk Oblast, RSFSR, USSR) is a Russian entrepreneur, co-founder, and co-owner of the beauty and cosmetics retail chain Gold Apple. As of 2025, the company stands as the largest beauty retailer in Russia, with operations spanning six countries.

== Education & Early Years ==
In 1974, his family moved to Sverdlovsk (now Yekaterinburg), where they continue to reside. From 1979 to 1989, Panyak attended School No. 76, where he met his future business partner, Ivan Kuzovlev. After graduating in 1990, he worked as a computer operator at the Sverdlovsk Regional Main Computing Center. In 1992, he planned to enroll in the Ural State Technical University (USTU) to study programming, but on his 18th birthday, he was drafted into the army. He served in special communications units, where he worked on information encryption.

Following his military service, Panyak entered the Ural State University of Economics (USUE), faculty of Planning and Economics, specializing in Commercial Activity Organization. During this time, he launched his first business. The venture required full-time dedication, and eventually, he chose business over continuing his studies.

== Professional Path & Business ==
In the early 1990s, Panyak founded Homeservice, one of the first companies in Yekaterinburg to offer ready-made food delivery. In 1996, together with Ivan Kuzovlev, he established the beauty and cosmetics chain Gold Apple. The first store was a small shop specializing in cosmetics. In 2004, the company adopted a new concept—a large beauty store with a stylish interior. This concept quickly became the company’s hallmark not only in Russia but also abroad.

Maxim Panyak is responsible for assortment, brand relations, and personnel management. Under his direct leadership, the company’s assortment has grown to 5,000 brands, more than 200 of which are carried exclusively by Gold Apple. The workforce expanded from 12 employees in 1996 to 14,000 by 2025. Advanced personnel management and training systems were introduced, including training through virtual reality technology. It became possible to solve the problems of commissioning large-scale projects: in 2025, the company opened a distribution center in the Istra district, creating more than 600 jobs at one time.

== Personal Life & Interests ==
Panyak resides in Russia and has three children. His father, Stefan Grigorievich Panyak, is a professor at the Department of Geology and Emergency Protection at the Ural State Mining University.

Maxim Panyak has a passion for contemporary art and poker, regularly participating in international tournaments. In 2011, he won the main event of the Russian Poker Tour in Kyiv. At the OFC World Championship tournament High Roller, became Russia's first Chinese poker world champion.
