= Yulia Lipnitskaya =

Russian figure skater (born 1998)

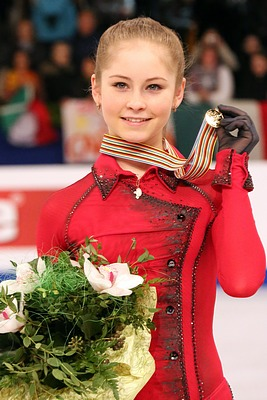
- Lipnitskaya at the 2014 European Championships

Personal information
- Native name: Юлия Вячеславовна Липницкая
- Full name: Yulia Vyacheslavovna Lipnitskaya
- Other names: Julia Lipnitskaia and Girl in the red coat
- Born: 5 June 1998 (age 28) Yekaterinburg, Russia
- Home town: Moscow, Russia
- Height: 1.60 m (5 ft 3 in)

Figure skating career
- Country: Russia
- Discipline: Women's singles
- Began skating: 2002
- Retired: 28 August 2017
- Highest WS: 3rd (2014 & 2015)

Medal record
Olympic Games
Gold medal – first place	2014 Sochi	Team
World Championships
Silver medal – second place	2014 Saitama	Singles
European Championships
Gold medal – first place	2014 Budapest	Singles
Grand Prix Final
Silver medal – second place	2013–14 Fukuoka	Singles
Russian Championships
Silver medal – second place	2012 Saransk	Singles
Silver medal – second place	2014 Sochi	Singles
World Junior Championships
Gold medal – first place	2012 Minsk	Singles
Silver medal – second place	2013 Milan	Singles
Junior Grand Prix Final
Gold medal – first place	2011–12 Quebec City	Singles

Yulia Vyacheslavovna Lipnitskaya (also spelled Julia Lipnitskaia; Russian: Юлия Вячеславовна Липницкая, IPA: [ˈjulʲɪjə vʲɪtɕɪˈslavəvnə lʲɪpˈnʲitskəjə]; born 5 June 1998) is a Russian figure skating coach and former figure skater. She was part of the Russian team that won the 2014 Winter Olympics team trophy. Individually, Lipnitskaya is the 2014 World silver medalist, the 2014 European champion, the 2013–14 Grand Prix Final silver medalist, and a two-time Russian national silver medalist (2012 and 2014). As a junior, Lipnitskaya won the 2012 World Junior Championships, 2011–12 Junior Grand Prix Final, and 2012 Russian Junior Championships. She retired from the sport in 2017 due to injuries and anorexia nervosa.

Lipnitskaya is the youngest Russian athlete to win a gold medal at the Winter Olympics. Within the women's singles category, she is the youngest gold medalist at the European Championships. She is also the second-youngest female figure skater to win a gold medal at the Olympics; Lipnitskaya was 15 years, 249 days old when Russia won the team trophy.

== Early life ==
Yulia Vyacheslavovna Lipnitskaya was born on 5 June 1998, in Yekaterinburg, Russia. Daniela Leonidovna Lipnitskaya, a single mother, raised Yulia and gave her daughter her surname. While Daniela was pregnant, Vyacheslav, Yulia's father, was drafted into the Russian army and chose not to return to the family afterward.

== Career ==
=== Early career ===
Lipnitskaya began figure skating at age four when her mother took her to train under coach Elena Levkovets. She also trained in rhythmic gymnastics to improve her flexibility. She skated in Yekaterinburg at DYUSSH Lokomotiv until 2009, when she and her mother began to discuss her future, concluding that they should relocate for her skating career. They moved to Moscow where Lipnitskaya joined Eteri Tutberidze's group in March 2009.

In the 2009–10 season, Lipnitskaya placed fifth on the junior level at the 2010 Russian Championships. She was fourth on the senior level the following season at the 2011 Russian Championships. She also competed at the 2011 Russian Junior Championships but withdrew from the competition after the short program.

=== 2011–12 season: International debut ===
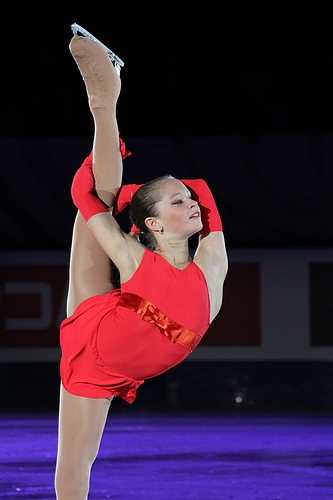
Lipnitskaya at the 2011–2012 Junior Grand Prix Final

Lipnitskaya became age-eligible for junior international competition in the 2011–12 season. She debuted on the Junior Grand Prix series at the Baltic Cup in Gdańsk, Poland, winning both programs to take the gold medal. She then won her second assignment in Milan, Italy, to qualify for the Junior Grand Prix Final. At the Junior Grand Prix Final in Quebec, Lipnitskaya placed first in both segments to win the gold medal.

Lipnitskaya won silver on the senior level at the 2012 Russian Championships, having placed third in the short program and first in the free skate. She later took gold at the 2012 Russian Junior Championships. At the World Junior Championships, she won gold while achieving the junior-level ladies' record for the combined total and the free skate. She had no falls on the ice when competing during the 2011–12 season.

=== 2012–13 season: Senior debut ===
Lipnitskaya became age-eligible for few senior events excluding the World and/or European Championships. She made her senior debut at the 2012 Finlandia Trophy where she won the gold medal. Lipnitskaya was assigned to two Grand Prix events. Having placed first in the short program and second in the free skate, Lipnitskaya won the silver medal at the 2012 Cup of China behind gold medalist Mao Asada. The day before she left for Paris for the 2012 Trophee Eric Bompard, Lipnitskaya twisted her right ankle during off-ice training and could hardly do any jumps a day before the start of the event, but decided to compete in the short program as she felt better. She placed first in the short program and third in the free skate and won the bronze medal.

Lipnitskaya qualified for the Grand Prix Final in Sochi, Russia, but withdrew due to injury. During training on 28 November, she lost balance on the entry to a spin, split her chin, and sustained a slight concussion. Doctors recommended that she stay off the ice for at least two weeks. She resumed partial training in mid-December, omitting jumps and spins, and then after eight days began full training. Needing more preparation time, Lipnitskaya withdrew from the senior Russian Championships. She returned to competition at the 2013 Russian Junior Championships and finished in fifth place. After the competition, Lipnitskaya said she was still working to return to form after her injury. She then competed at the 2013 World Junior Championships where she won the silver medal with teammates Elena Radionova and Anna Pogorilaya taking the gold and bronze medals respectively.

=== 2013–14 season: Olympic and European champion ===
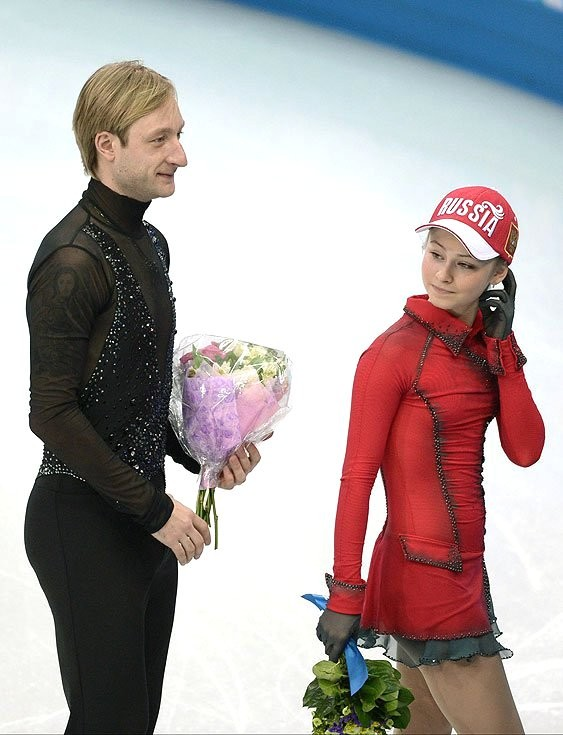
Lipnitskaya at the 2014 Olympics Team event with Evgeni Plushenko

Lipnitskaya selected all the music for her 2013–14 programs by herself. She chose Mark Minkov's You Don't Give Up On Love for her short program. For the free skate, she chose the theme from Schindler's List after she had watched the film many times. Initially, her coach was not convinced it was a good idea, and they struggled to find a choreographer for the program. Former ice dancer Ilia Averbukh choreographed both programs.

In the 2013–14 season, Lipnitskaya became age-eligible for all senior ISU events. She began her season by winning the gold medal at the 2013 Finlandia Trophy. Her first 2013–14 Grand Prix event was the 2013 Skate Canada International. She placed second in the short program and first in the free skate, winning gold with 198.23 points. At the 2013 Rostelecom Cup, she scored 72.24 points in the short program to take the lead. Despite losing the free skate to Italy's Carolina Kostner, she still won the gold medal overall and qualified for the Grand Prix Final. At the event in Fukuoka, Japan, she placed fourth in the short program, second in the free skate, and won the silver medal behind Mao Asada.

Lipnitskaya won the silver medal behind Adelina Sotnikova at the 2014 Russian Championships, after placing second in the short and first in the free. In her European Championships debut, she placed second to Sotnikova in the short program, first in the free skate, and scored a total of 209.72 points. Finishing ahead of Sotnikova and Carolina Kostner, 15-year-old Lipnitskaya became the youngest European champion in ladies' singles and the first Russian to win the ladies' title since Slutskaya eight years earlier, in 2006.

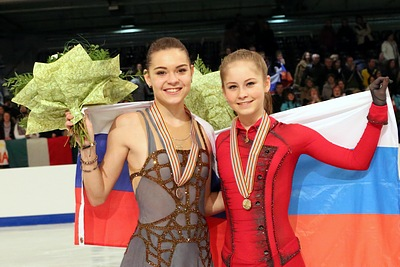
Yulia Lipnitskaya and Adelina Sotnikova at the 2014 European Championships.

Lipnitskaya was selected for the 2014 Winter Olympics in Sochi. The first skating event was the team trophy, which allowed each team to make a maximum of two substitutions. The Russian team initially discussed assigning Lipnitskaya to the free skate and Sotnikova to the short program, but ultimately, it was decided that Lipnitskaya would skate both. She placed first in both segments to help team Russia win the gold medal. She became the youngest Olympic gold medalist in figure skating under modern rules, being six days younger than American Tara Lipinski when she won the 1998 Winter Olympics at 15 in Nagano, Japan. The only skater younger than Lipnitskaya to have won gold is Maxi Herber who won Olympic pair skating gold at the 1936 Winter Olympics. However, Herber would have been too young to skate at the Olympics under modern rules, so her record is impossible to beat. On 10 February 2014, Lipnitskaya appeared on the cover of Time magazine in the European and Asian editions. After the team event, she left Sochi to train at her regular rink in Moscow. Her coach Tutberidze said that the Russian media interest was excessive—listening devices were found in the locker room in Moscow, and reporters followed both the skater and her relatives. In the individual event, she placed fifth in the short program after falling on her triple-flip, sixth in the free skate after a step out on her triple-loop and a fall on her triple-salchow, and finished fifth overall.

In March, Lipnitskaya received a letter from Steven Spielberg, the director of Schindler's List, praising her portrayal of the girl in the red coat. A few weeks later, she made her World Championship debut at the 2014 World Championships in Saitama, Japan. She placed third in the short program and second in the free skate earning 132.96 points, and won the silver medal. Her total score of 207.50 points placed her 9.19 points behind the gold medalist Mao Asada and 3.67 ahead of the bronze medalist Carolina Kostner.

=== 2014–15 season: Struggles ===
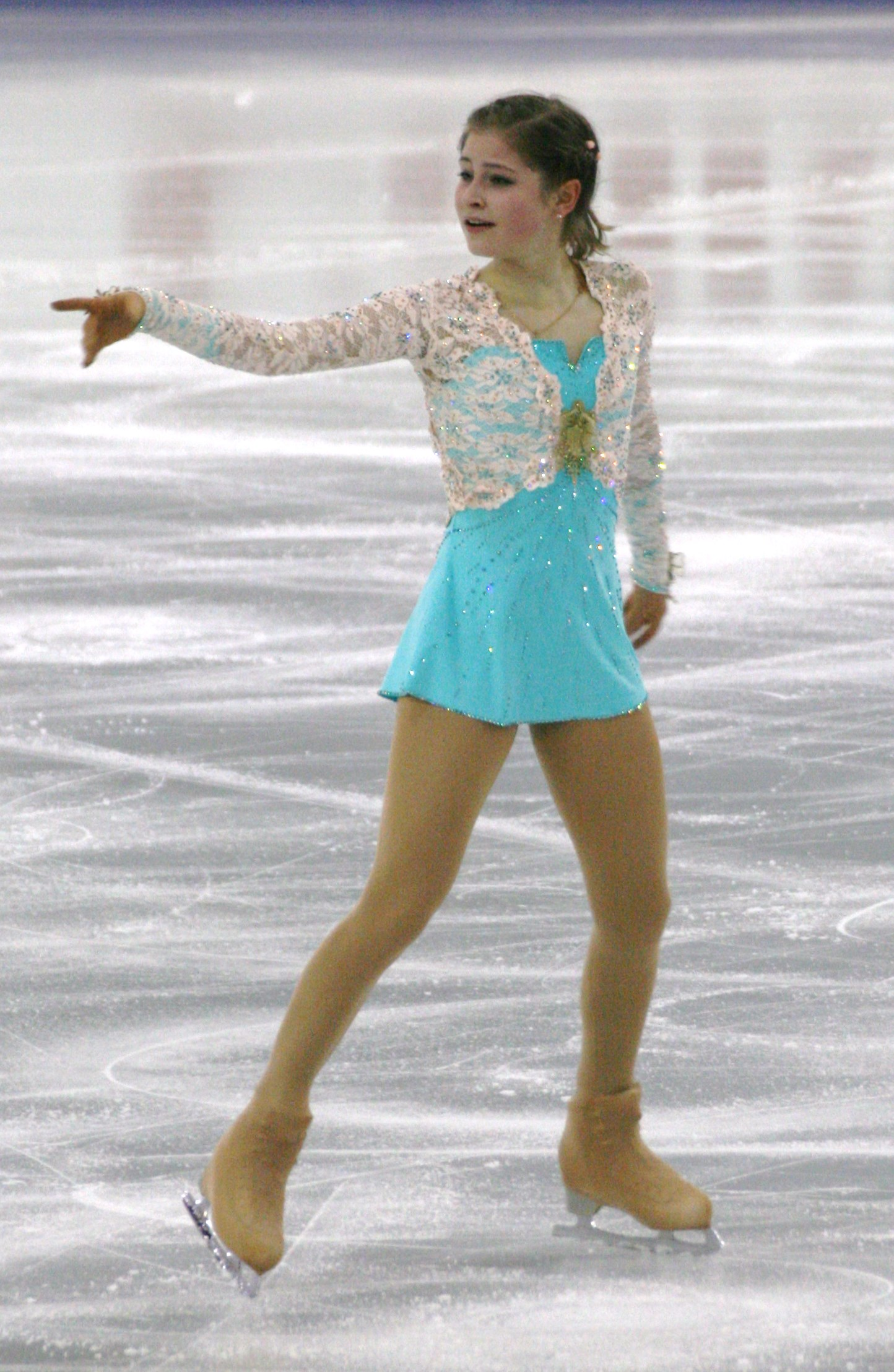
Lipnitskaya at the 2014–15 Grand Prix Final

For the 2014–15 Grand Prix season, Lipnitskaya was selected to compete at the 2014 Cup of China and the 2014 Trophée Éric Bompard. At the Cup of China, Lipnitskaya was first after the short program. However, she was fourth in her free skate, putting her second overall behind Elizaveta Tuktamysheva. Lipnitskaya missed the medal ceremony because she left the rink to go to her hotel due to the stress of having a poor free skate, and she was unaware of the time of the ceremony. She had received a call from the event organizers, informing her of the ceremony and hurried back to the rink, but it had been too late to attend. The International Skating Union fined her by deducting part of her prize money. Lipnitskaya won the silver medal at the Trophée Bompard behind compatriot Elena Radionova after placing second in both segments. Her results qualified her for the Grand Prix Final in Barcelona. In the final, she placed second in the short program behind Tuktamysheva. However, she struggled during the free skate, causing her to drop to fifth overall.

At the 2015 Russian Championships, Lipnitskaya placed sixth in the short program and eleventh in the free skate, which resulted in ninth place overall. She was not selected to compete at the 2015 European Championships, preventing her from defending her title, nor at the 2015 World Championships. On 13 January 2015, after a meeting with FFKKR officials, Lipnitskaya stated that this season was over for her and that she would recover and train for the next season. She also said that she intended to stay with her then-coaches.

=== 2015–16 season: Coaching change ===
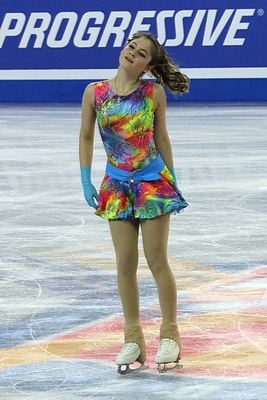
Yulia at 2015 Skate America

In May 2015, Lipnitskaya started working with a new choreographer, Marina Zueva, in Chicago to prepare her programs for the season. Her 2015–16 Grand Prix assignments were the Skate America and the Trophée Éric Bompard. She began her season with a second-place finish at the 2015 Finlandia Trophy. She placed fifth at the 2015 Skate America during the short program but dropped to seventh after struggles in the free skate, resulting in an overall sixth place finish. After the short program at the Trophée Éric Bompard, she was in second place, but the competition was canceled due to the terrorist attacks in Paris, which occurred only hours after the first day of competition concluded.

On 18 November 2015, Lipnitskaya announced that she left her longtime coaches, Eteri Tutberidze and Sergei Dudakov, to move to train under 1994 Olympic champion, Alexei Urmanov, in Sochi. Then in December, she competed at the Russian Championships, where she finished in seventh place after making several mistakes in the free skate. Following her placement at the Russian Championships, she was not selected to compete at the European Championships. She then competed at the 2015–16 Russian Cup Final, where she placed first in the short program, and second in the free skate, resulting in a silver medal finish behind compatriot Alena Leonova. Lipnitskaya competed at the 2016 Cup of Tyrol in Innsbruck, Austria, despite her doctors recommending rest due to a hip injury. She won the gold medal, her first win at a competition in two years.

=== 2016–17 season: Injuries ===
For the 2016–17 season, Lipnitskaya was assigned to two ISU Grand Prix events, the Skate America and the Rostelecom Cup. She began the season at the Ondrej Nepela Memorial held in Bratislava, Slovakia. During the short program, her music was turned on before she got to her starting position, but the referee stopped the music and allowed her to restart. She won the short program but then placed fifth in the free skate. She won the silver medal overall behind teammate Maria Sotskova.

Lipnitskaya withdrew from the Skate America after a recurring injury. She still opted to compete at her second Grand Prix assignment, the 2016 Rostelecom Cup. In the short program, Lipnitskaya earned 69.25 points, and she went into third place behind compatriots Elena Radionova and Anna Pogorilaya. In the free skate, her leg injury aggravated her, causing her to stop just after the halfway point in the program. After negotiating with the judges and her coach, she was allowed to continue where she left off, but she was heavily penalized for the interruption. Her free skate score was only 79.21 points, making for a total score of 148.46, finishing in 12th and last place.

Following training on 18 December 2016, Lipnitskaya slipped on a patch of ice, injuring her right hip and lower back. As a result, she withdrew from the Russian Championships.

=== Retirement ===
On 28 August 2017, Lipnitskaya's mother, Daniela, told TASS that her daughter had decided to retire in April after returning from three months of treatment for anorexia. President of the Russian Figure Skating Federation, Valentin Piseev, confirmed that Lipnitskaya had informed them of her decision in April and that August's announcement "did not come as a surprise".

Despite being retired from competitive figure skating, she is still involved in the sport and teaches masterclasses for young skaters. In December 2020, Lipnitskaya joined the coaching staff of Evgeni Plushenko's skating academy.

== Personal life ==
In June 2020, Lipnitskaya confirmed that she was expecting her first child with her partner at the time Vladislav Tarasenko. Her daughter was born in June 2020. In 2022, Tarasenko was drafted for the Russian army during the Russian invasion of Ukraine. The couple separated sometime after his deployment.

In June 2024 Yulia Lipnitskaya married Dmitri Mikhailov, a Russian figure skating coach and choreographer. The couple have worked at the academy of Olympic champion Evgeni Plushenko and frequently skate together in ice shows. They had a son in September 2024.

== Records and achievements ==
- Youngest Olympic figure skating gold medalist since 1936 and second-youngest ever.
- Youngest Russian athlete to win a gold medal at the Winter Olympics.
- Youngest women's singles skater to win the European title.
- First Russian women's singles skater to score above the 200 mark in total score.
- Former world record holder for the junior women's free skate score (123.96), set at the 2012 World Junior Championships on 3 March 2012. The record was broken two years later on 16 March 2014 by Elena Radionova.
- Former world record holder for the junior women's total score (187.05), set at the 2012 World Junior Championships on 3 March 2012. The record was also broken two years later on 16 March 2014 by Elena Radionova.

=== List of Lipnitskaya's junior world record scores ===
Lipnitskaya formerly held the junior world records in the free skate and combined total.

Chronological list of world record scores in the +3/-3 GOE System
Date	Score	Segment	Event	Notes
Oct 9, 2011	119.34	Free skate	2011 JGP Italy	Lipnitskaya broke Mao Asada's junior record, which had lasted since March 2005.
Oct 9, 2011	183.05	Combined total	2011 JGP Italy	Lipnitskaya broke Mao Asada's junior record, which had lasted since March 2005. Lipnitskaya became the first junior woman to score above 180 points.
Dec 11, 2011	119.75	Free skate	2011–12 Junior Grand Prix Final	Lipnitskaya broke her own junior record.
Mar 4, 2012	123.96	Free skate	2012 World Junior Championships	Lipnitskaya became the first junior woman to score above 120 points in the free skate. Elena Radionova broke this record at the 2014 World Junior Championships.
Mar 4, 2012	187.05	Combined total	2012 World Junior Championships	This record was broken by Elena Radionova at the 2014 World Junior Championships.

== Programs ==
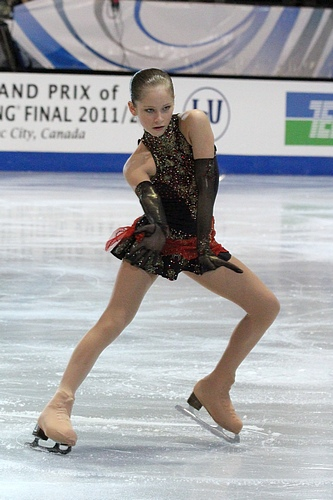
Lipnitskaya at the 2011–12 Junior Grand Prix Final

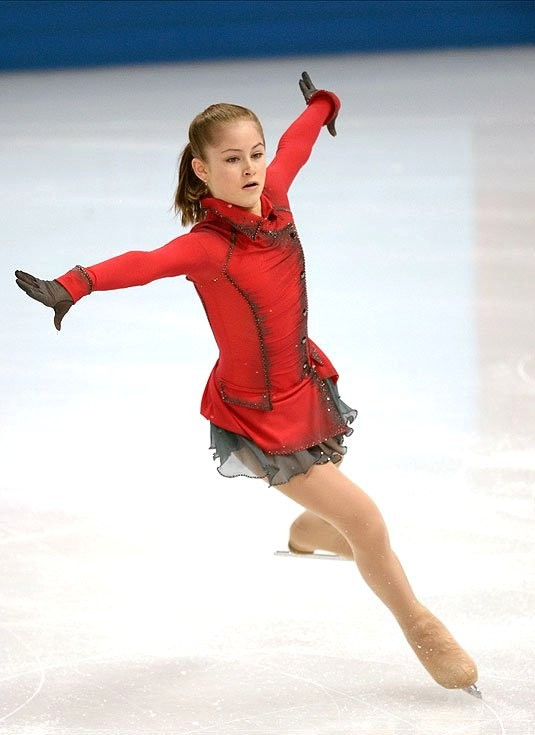
Lipnitskaya competing her free skate at the 2014 Olympics Team event

Competition and exhibition programs by season
Season	Short program	Free skate program	Exhibition program
2011–12	"Dark Eyes": Choreo. by Nikolai Morozov	"Un Giorno Per Noi": From Romeo and Juliet; Composed by Nino Rota; Choreo. by Nikolai Morozov	"Je t'aime": Performed by Lara Fabian
2012–13	"Sabre Dance": Composed by Aram Khachaturian; Performed by Vanessa-Mae; Choreo. by Nikolai Morozov	Pas de Deux: From The Nutcracker; Choreo. by Nikolai Morozov	"Je t'aime": Performed by Lara Fabian
2013–14	"You Don't Give Up On Love" (Не отрекаются любя): Composed by Mark Minkov; Choreo. by Ilia Averbukh	Schindler's List: Composed by John Williams; Choreo. by Ilia Averbukh	"Je t'aime": Performed by Lara Fabian
2013–14	"You Don't Give Up On Love" (Не отрекаются любя): Composed by Mark Minkov; Choreo. by Ilia Averbukh	Schindler's List: Composed by John Williams; Choreo. by Ilia Averbukh	"Sabre Dance": Composed by Aram Khachaturian; Performed by Vanessa-Mae; Choreo. by Nikolai Morozov
2013–14	"You Don't Give Up On Love" (Не отрекаются любя): Composed by Mark Minkov; Choreo. by Ilia Averbukh	Schindler's List: Composed by John Williams; Choreo. by Ilia Averbukh	Kill Bill Vol. 1
2014–15	"Megapolis" (Мегаполис): Composed by Bel Suono; Choreo. by Ilia Averbukh	Romeo and Juliet: 1. "A Time for Us"; From Romeo and Juliet; Composed by Nino Rota; 2. "Mother's Journey"; From Good Bye, Lenin!; Composed by Yann Tiersen; 3. "Forbidden Love"; From Romeo and Juliet; Composed by Abel Korzeniowski; Choreo. by Ilia Averbukh	"It's Wonderful": Performed by Paolo Conte
2015–16	Elvis Presley: Choreo. by Marina Zueva; Tracks used: 1. "Can't Help Falling in Love"; 2. "(You're the) Devil in Disguise"	"Leningrad": Composed by William Joseph; Choreo. by Marina Zueva	"Megapolis" (Мегаполис): Composed by Bel Suono; Choreo. by Ilia Averbukh
2015–16	Elvis Presley: Choreo. by Marina Zueva; Tracks used: 1. "Can't Help Falling in Love"; 2. "(You're the) Devil in Disguise"	"Leningrad": Composed by William Joseph; Choreo. by Marina Zueva	"Dance for You": Performed by Beyoncé
2016–17	"Les feuilles mortes": Composed by Joseph Kosma; Performed by Koala Liu; Choreo. by Stéphane Lambiel	Kill Bill: Choreo. by Alexei Urmanov and Olga Poverennaya; Tracks used: 1. "Twisted Nerve"; 2. "Goodnight Moon"; 3. "Ironside"; 4. "Bang Bang (My Baby Shot Me Down)"; 5. "Battle Without Honor or Humanity"	—N/a

== Competitive highlights ==
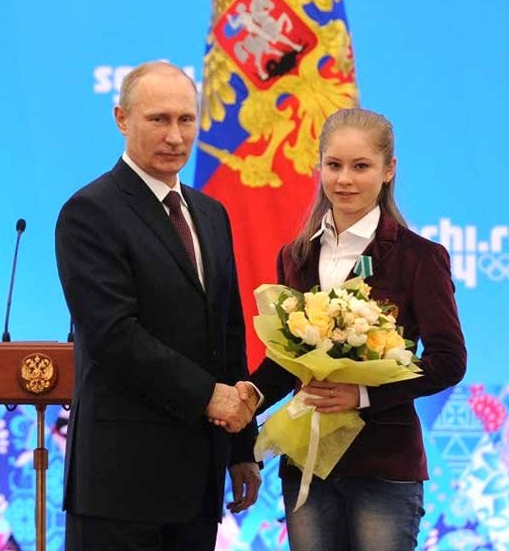
Lipnitskaya at the awarding ceremony for Russian athletes with President Vladimir Putin in 2014

- GP – Event of the ISU Grand Prix Series
- JGP – Event of the ISU Junior Grand Prix Series
- CS – Event of the ISU Challenger Series
- WD – Withdrew from competition

Competition placements at senior level
Season	2010–11	2011–12	2012–13	2013–14	2014–15	2015–16	2016–17
Winter Olympics				5th			
Winter Olympics (Team event)				1st			
World Championships				2nd			
European Championships				1st			
Grand Prix Final			WD	2nd	5th		
Russian Championships	4th	2nd	WD	2nd	9th	7th	
GP Cup of China			2nd		2nd		
GP Rostelecom Cup				1st			12th
GP Skate America						6th	
GP Skate Canada				1st			
GP Trophée Éric Bompard			3rd		2nd	2nd	
CS Finlandia Trophy			1st	1st		2nd	
CS Nepela Memorial							2nd
Cup of Tyrol						1st	
Russian Cup Final						2nd	

Competition placements at junior level
Season	2009–10	2010–11	2011–12	2012–13
World Junior Championships			1st	2nd
Junior Grand Prix Final			1st	
Russian Championships	5th	WD	1st	5th
JGP Italy			1st	
JGP Poland			1st	

== Detailed results ==
ISU personal best scores in the +3/-3 GOE System
Segment	Type	Score	Event
Total	TSS	209.72	2014 European Championships
Short program	TSS	74.54	2014 World Championships
Short program	TES	40.83	2014 World Championships
Short program	PCS	33.71	2014 World Championships
Free skating	TSS	139.75	2014 European Championships
Free skating	TES	71.75	2014 European Championships
Free skating	PCS	70.06	2014 Winter Olympics

=== Senior level ===
- Small medals for the short program and free skating are only awarded at ISU Championships.

Results in the 2010–11 season
Date	Event	SP		FS		Total		Details
Date	Event	P	Score	P	Score	P	Score	Details
26–29 Dec 2010	(Russia) 2011 Russian Championships	5	59.13	4	117.14	4	176.27	Details

Results in the 2011–12 season
Date	Event	SP		FS		Total		Details
Date	Event	P	Score	P	Score	P	Score	Details
25–29 Dec 2011	(Russia) 2012 Russian Championships	3	63.11	1	128.54	2	191.65	Details

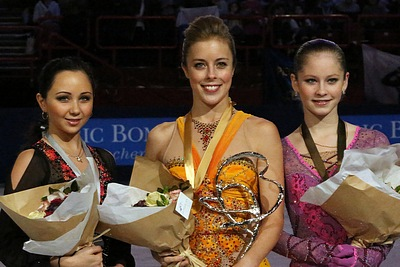
Lipnitskaya (right) with Ashley Wagner and Elizaveta Tuktamysheva at the 2012 Trophée Éric Bompard podium

Results in the 2012–13 season
Date	Event	SP		FS		Total		Details
Date	Event	P	Score	P	Score	P	Score	Details
5–7 Oct 2012	(Finland) 2012 Finlandia Trophy	2	64.05	1	124.18	1	188.23	Details
2–4 Nov 2012	2012 Cup of China	1	63.06	2	114.86	2	177.92	Details
16–18 Nov 2012	(France) 2012 Trophée Éric Bompard	1	63.55	3	115.76	3	179.31	Details

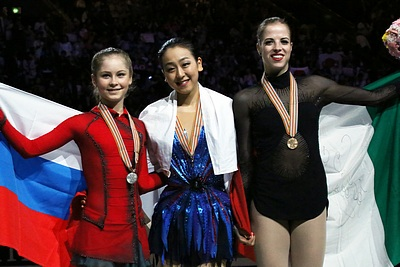
Lipnitskaya (left) with Mao Asada and Carolina Kostner at the 2014 World Championships podium

Results in the 2013–14 season
Date	Event	SP		FS		Total		Details
Date	Event	P	Score	P	Score	P	Score	Details
4–6 Oct 2013	(Finland) 2013 Finlandia Trophy	1	65.49	1	125.82	1	191.31	Details
25–27 Oct 2013	2013 Skate Canada International	2	66.89	1	131.34	1	198.23	Details
22–24 Nov 2013	(Russia) 2013 Rostelecom Cup	1	72.24	2	118.56	1	190.80	Details
5–8 Dec 2013	(Japan) 2013–14 Grand Prix Final	4	66.62	2	125.45	2	192.07	Details
24–26 Dec 2013	(Russia) 2014 Russian Championships	2	70.32	1	140.49	2	210.81	Details
15–19 Jan 2014	(Hungary) 2014 European Championships	2	69.97	1	139.75	1	209.72	Details
6–9 Feb 2014	(Russia) 2014 Winter Olympics (Team event)	1	72.90	1	141.51	1	–	Details
19–20 Feb 2014	(Russia) 2014 Winter Olympics	5	65.23	6	135.34	5	200.57	Details
27–29 Mar 2014	(Japan) 2014 World Championships	3	74.54	2	132.96	2	207.50	Details

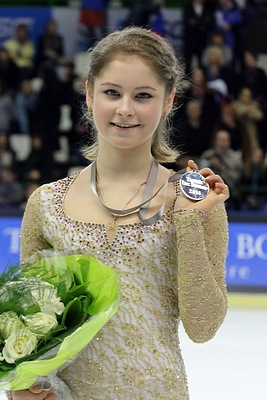
Lipnitskaya at the 2014 Trophée Éric Bompard

Results in the 2014–15 season
Date	Event	SP		FS		Total		Details
Date	Event	P	Score	P	Score	P	Score	Details
7–9 Nov 2014	2014 Cup of China	1	69.56	4	104.01	2	173.57	Details
21–23 Nov 2014	(France) 2014 Trophée Éric Bompard	2	66.79	2	118.39	2	185.18	Details
11–14 Dec 2014	(Spain) 2014–15 Grand Prix Final	2	66.24	6	111.55	5	177.79	Details
24–28 Dec 2014	(Russia) 2015 Russian Championships	6	66.90	11	102.80	9	169.70	Details

Results in the 2015–16 season
Date	Event	SP		FS		Total		Details
Date	Event	P	Score	P	Score	P	Score	Details
8–11 Oct 2015	(Finland) 2015 CS Finlandia Trophy	2	62.81	2	109.52	2	172.33	Details
23–25 Oct 2015	(United States) 2015 Skate America	5	62.24	7	108.39	6	170.63	Details
13–15 Nov 2015	(France) 2015 Trophée Éric Bompard	2	65.63	–	–	2	–	Details
24–27 Dec 2015	(Russia) 2016 Russian Championships	3	73.77	10	121.47	7	195.24	Details
16–20 Feb 2016	(Russia) 2016 Russian Cup Final	1	65.43	3	123.12	2	188.55	Details
9–13 Mar 2016	(Austria) 2016 Cup of Tyrol	1	66.73	1	105.91	1	172.64	Details

Note: The 2015 Trophée Éric Bompard was cancelled after the November 2015 Paris attacks. The short programs had been completed on 13 November, but the free skates were to be held the next day. On 23 November, the International Skating Union announced that the short program results would be considered as the final results for the competition.

Results in the 2016–17 season
Date	Event	SP		FS		Total		Details
Date	Event	P	Score	P	Score	P	Score	Details
29 Sep – 1 October 2016	(Slovakia) 2016 CS Ondrej Nepela Memorial	1	63.16	5	102.30	2	165.46	Details
4–6 Nov 2016	(Russia) 2016 Rostelecom Cup	3	69.25	12	79.21	12	148.46	Details

=== Junior level ===
Results in the 2009–10 season
Date	Event	SP		FS		Total		Details
Date	Event	P	Score	P	Score	P	Score	Details
3–6 Feb 2010	(Russia) 2010 Russian Championships (Junior)	5	55.66	5	99.84	5	155.50	Details

Results in the 2010–11 season
Date	Event	SP		FS		Total		Details
Date	Event	P	Score	P	Score	P	Score	Details
2–4 Feb 2011	(Russia) 2011 Russian Championships (Junior)	7	51.75	–	–	–	WD	Details

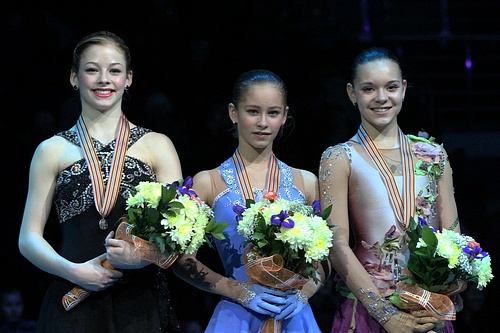
Lipnitskaya (center) at the 2012 World Junior Championships

Results in the 2011–12 season
Date	Event	SP		FS		Total		Details
Date	Event	P	Score	P	Score	P	Score	Details
15–17 Sep 2011	2011 JGP Poland	1	60.37	1	112.14	1	172.51	Details
6–8 Oct 2011	2011 JGP Italy	1	63.71	1	119.34	1	183.05	Details
8–11 Dec 2011	(Canada) 2011–12 Junior Grand Prix Final	1	59.98	1	119.75	1	179.73	Details
5–7 Feb 2012	(Russia) 2012 Russian Championships (Junior)	1	65.28	1	126.64	1	191.92	Details
2–3 Mar 2012	(Belarus) 2012 World Junior Championships	1	63.09	1	123.96	1	187.05	Details

Results in the 2012–13 season
Date	Event	SP		FS		Total		Details
Date	Event	P	Score	P	Score	P	Score	Details
1–2 Feb 2013	(Russia) 2013 Russian Championships (Junior)	3	67.03	6	111.53	5	178.56	Details
2–3 Mar 2013	(Italy) 2013 World Junior Championships	4	53.86	2	111.81	2	165.67	Details

== Awards ==
- Russian Order of Friendship for "great contribution to the development of physical culture and sports, high sports achievements at the 2014 XXII Winter Olympic Games in the city of Sochi" (24 February 2014)

Year	Award	Category	Result	Ref.
2015	Kids' Choice Awards	Favorite Russian Sports Star		Won
