= Alla Shekhovtsova =

Russian figure skating judge (born 1964)

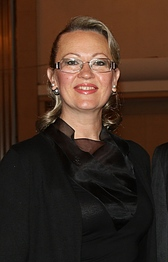
Shekhovtsova in 2017

Alla Viktorovna Shekhovtsova (Russian: Алла Викторовна Шеховцова; born 2 November 1964 in Sverdlovsk) is a Russian figure skating judge and ISU Technical Specialist and a former ISU Ice Dance Technical Committee member. A former ice dancer, she is married to Valentin Piseev, who was the general director of the Figure Skating Federation of Russia until 2010. They have a son, Stanislav (born 1989).

== Biography ==
Shekhovtsova started skating at age 5. Her father was a hockey player.

Shekhovtsova first competed as an ice dancer. When she realized that she could never compete at the highest level, she left skating. She graduated from the Ural State University of Economics and later from the Russian Academy of Theatre Arts (ice choreography faculty), where she studied in the same class with Zhanna Gromova. At the same time she started coaching at the Sverdlovsk figure skating school, where she trained under Igor Ksenofontov. After a year she became a senior coach of the Sverdlovsk ice dancing school.

Shekhovtsova moved to Moscow and worked as a coach in the class of Natalia Linichuk and Gennadi Karponosov, and took over the class after they decided to leave for the USA. She later became a judge, judging at the Russian Championships, European Figure Skating Championships and World Figure Skating Championships. She judged figure skating at the 2002 Winter Olympics, 2006 Winter Olympics, 2010 Winter Olympics, and 2014 Winter Olympics.

Since 2000, Shekhovtsova has been a deputy general director at the Odintsovo Hockey and Figure Skating Children's Center.

== Criticism ==
Shekhovtsova and her husband, Valentin Piseev, have been publicly criticized by Russian coaches and skaters. Shekhovtsova has been called "the First Lady" and "grey eminence" due to her influence on Piseev, and therefore on the Figure Skating Federation of Russia. A figure skating coach Elena Tchaikovskaia stated that Piseev only listened "to one adviser", which was his wife. She later criticised Shekhovtsova for becoming an ISU Ice Dance Technical Committee member despite "knowing nothing about ice dancing". When asked about the relationship with her husband in the interview, Shekhovtsova stated that "the talks about my influence are greatly exaggerated" and Piseev "is the one who always makes all the decisions".

At the 2014 Winter Olympics, her appointment as a judge caused a controversy. She judged the ladies' single skating competition and was photographed hugging Russian skater Adelina Sotnikova in the arena after competition. Sotnikova won the gold medal. The Korean Olympic Committee (KOC) filed an official complaint against Shekhovtsova, citing the hug and her marriage to Valentin Piseev as reasons for a conflict of interest. The complaint was, however, dismissed by ISU.
