= Ivan Kuzovlev =

Ivan Gennadievich Kuzovlev
- Иван Кузовлев
- Born: 26 February 1972 (age 54); Shamary, Shalinsky District, Sverdlovsk Oblast, Russian SFSR, Soviet Union (now Russia)
- Education: Ural State University of Economics
- Occupation: Co-Owner of Gold Apple
- Children: 3 children

Ivan Gennadievich Kuzovlev (Russian: Иван Геннадиевич Кузовлев; born February 26, 1972, in Shamary, Shalinsky District, Sverdlovsk Oblast) is a Russian entrepreneur, co-founder, and co-owner of the beauty and cosmetics retail chain Gold Apple. As of 2025, the company stands as the largest beauty retailer in Russia, with operations spanning six countries.

== Education & Early Years ==
From 1979 to 1986, Kuzovlev studied at School No. 25 in the city of Verkhnyaya Pyshma before moving to Yekaterinburg. In 1989, he graduated from School No. 76, where he studied alongside his future business partner, Maxim Panyak.

In 1993, he earned a degree in economics from the Ural State University of Economics (USUE), graduating from the Faculty of Planning and Economics with a specialization in Commercial Activity Organization.

== Professional Path & Business ==
Kuzovlev began his entrepreneurial journey in 1992 with a food delivery business in Yekaterinburg.

In 1996, together with Maxim Panyak, he founded the beauty and cosmetics chain Gold Apple. The first store was a small shop specializing in cosmetics. In 2004, the company adopted a new concept—a large beauty store with a stylish interior, a format unusual for self-service stores. This concept quickly became the company’s hallmark not only in Russia but also abroad.

Ivan Kuzovlev is responsible for shaping the strategy and driving the growth of Gold Apple. Under the leadership of Ivan Kuzovlev Gold Apple established the IT department as a separate company GA Tech team in 2020. As of 2025, the team has 700 employees. The automated personnel management system, developed under his leadership, allowed for a 25% increase in the efficiency of personnel use. He oversees e-commerce, the introduction of new technologies and innovations, as well as marketing and expansion into new regions and countries. Under his direct leadership, the company underwent a digital transformation, becoming one of the most technologically advanced and successful platforms in Russian e-commerce. The website goldapple.ru ranks among the country’s TOP-15 largest online stores, according to Data Insight (2025), while its mobile app was recognized as the best in beauty retail (Go Mobile and MTS Ads, 2024).

Since 2020, the company has been pursuing active international expansion. Its stores and delivery services first launched in the CIS region, followed by the Middle East. By 2025, Gold Apple operates in six countries, including Russia, Kazakhstan, Belarus, Qatar, the UAE, and Saudi Arabia, with a workforce of more than 14 000 employees. As Ivan Kuzovlev commented in an interview with Forbes, the opening of the second Golden Apple store in Saudi Arabia is planned in 2026 in the capital Riyadh.

== Personal life ==
Kuzovlev lives in Russia and is raising three children. He has a passion for contemporary art, architecture, design, painting, and tennis. He prefers a rural way of life, engaging in home farming that includes growing fruits and vegetables as well as keeping poultry.
