= Gold Apple (company) =

Russian chain of beauty stores

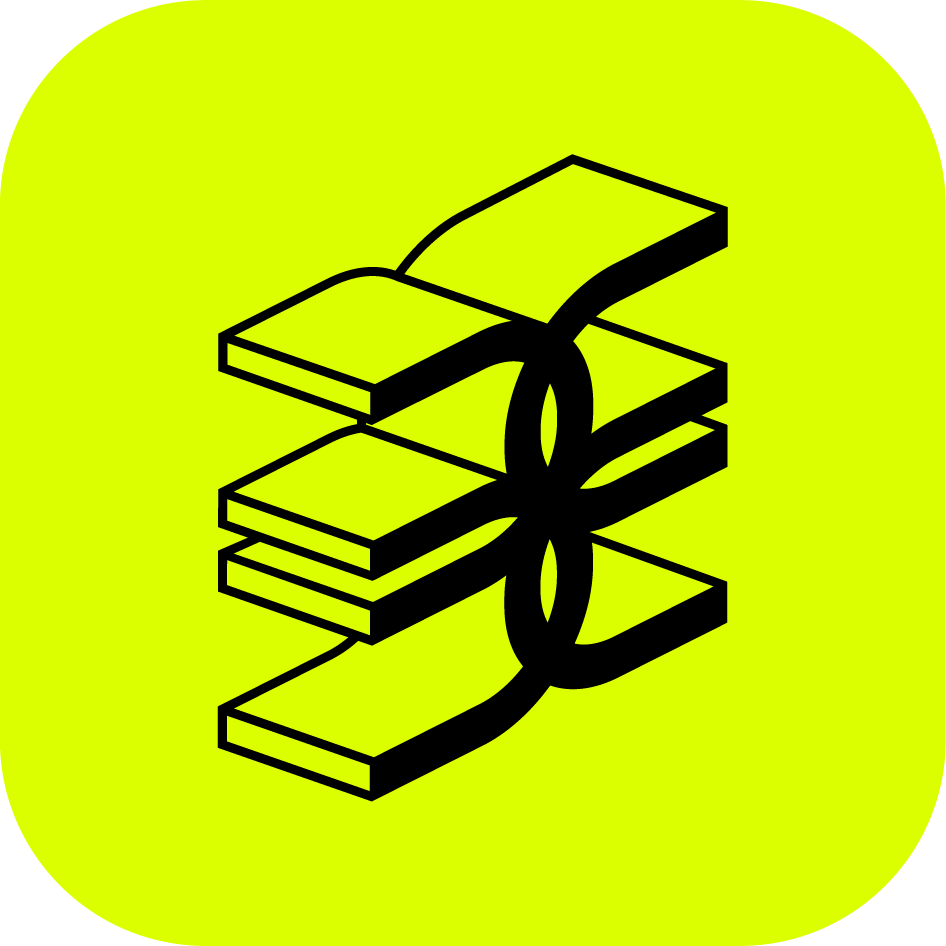

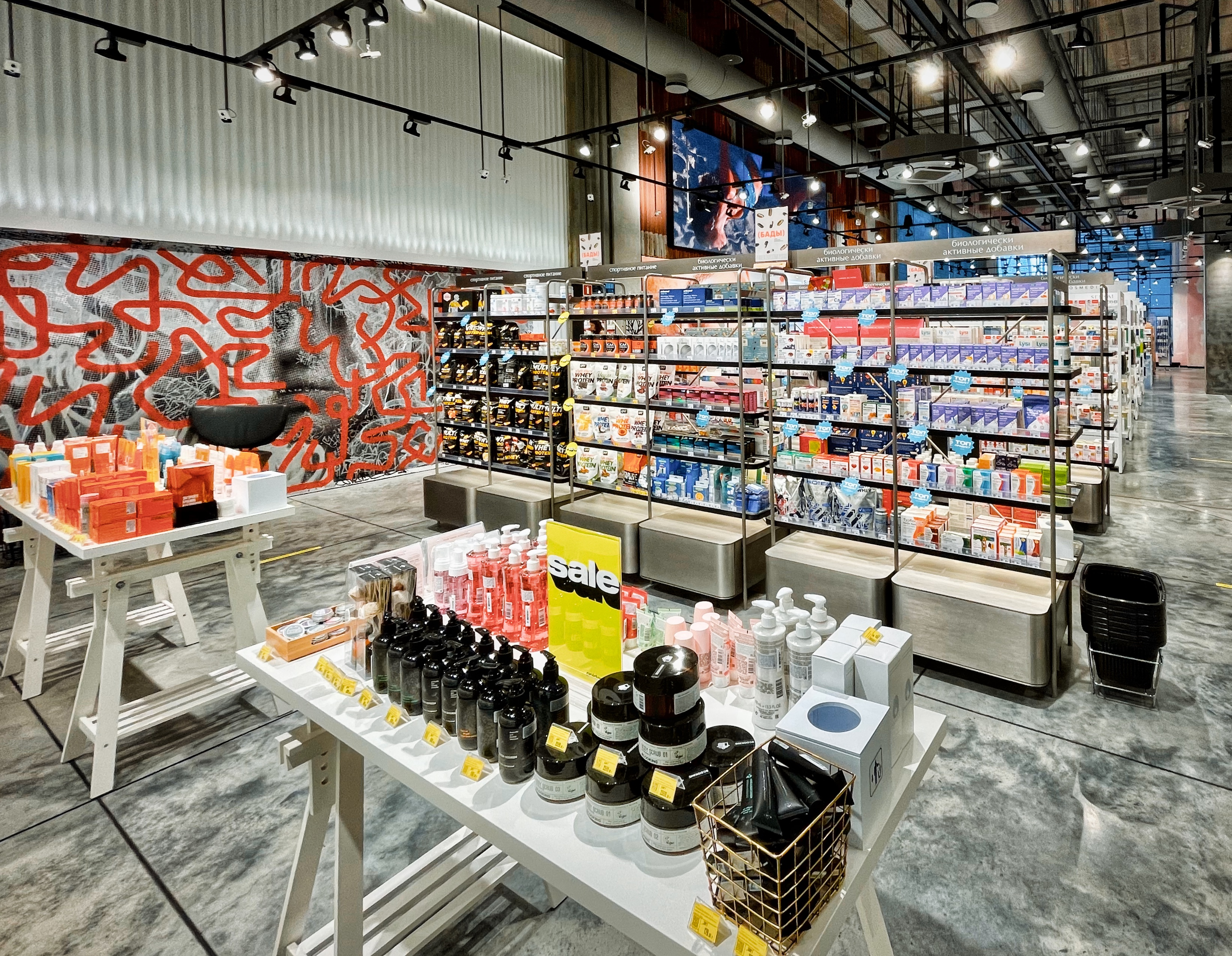
- The Gold Apple shopping space in Moscow
- Type: Privately held company
- Industry: Retail, e-commerce, beauty
- Founded: 1996; 30 years ago
- Headquarters: Russia, Yekaterinburg
- Number of locations: (2020)
- Key people: Ivan Kuzovlev (co-founder), Maxim Panyak (co-founder), Anna Koshkina (CEO)
- Revenue: $1.7 billion only in Russia (2024)
- Number of employees: up to 14000 (2025)
- Website: https://goldapple.ru https://goldapple.kz/kk https://goldapple.by https://goldapple.ae https://goldapple.sa https://goldapple.qa

Gold Apple (Russian: Золотое яблоко, Zolotoe Yabloko) is a Russian chain of beauty stores, one of the biggest international beauty retailers, offering 5,000 brands, 200 of which are exclusively sold in the Gold Apple, including its private label FOR ME.

As of summer 2025, Gold Apple operates in six countries, including CIS and the Gulf states of UAE, Qatar and Saudi Arabia. The Russian headquarter is located in Yekaterinburg. Middle East headquarter is in Dubai. By April 2025, Gold Apple ranks first in Russia in terms of sales in its segment.

== History and international development ==
Founded in 1996 in Russia, Gold Apple was founded by two classmates — Ivan Kuzovlev and Maxim Panyak. The first store in a "beauty supermarket" format was opened in 2004. Since then, the company has opened about 50 stores worldwide.

Today, Gold Apple operates in six countries and is planning to launch in the seventh one. As for August 2025, the company has 38 stores in 20 cities of Russia, 2 stores in Belarus, 5 stores in Kazakhstan, one store each in the UAE, Saudi Arabia, Qatar. The company plans to enter the Chinese market in 2026 by opening an offline and online store in Shanghai. The average selling space of supermarkets is 1,500 m^{2}.

== Operations ==
By the end of 2024, Gold Apple reported $1.7 billion revenue in Russia, with global revenue surging 70% year-over-year due to strategic international expansion. Gold Apple is outperforming its competitors by revenue per square meter. One of the key factors in the company's sales growth was the development of e-commerce. Thus, revenue from sales through the Gold Apple online store has doubled over the 2025 year, and the share of the e-commerce in total turnover is more than 50%.

== E-commerce ==
The company launched its online store. in 2018. In the fall of 2020, the online store features were added to Gold Apple's mobile app. Gold Apple's online store delivers across all the countries where the retailer operates. The website goldapple.ru ranks among the country’s TOP-15 largest online stores, according to Data Insight (2025), while its mobile app was recognized as the best in beauty retail (Go Mobile and MTS Ads, 2024).

== IT ==
Under the leadership of Ivan Kuzovlev Gold Apple established the IT department as a separate company GA Tech team in 2020. As of 2025, the team has 700 employees.

== Gold Apple at Middle East ==
The beauty retailer entered the Gulf region market in 2024, launched e-commerce in spring and opened a store in Qatar’s Doha Festival City. At the end of 2024 the company launched its online store and delivery in UAE and in spring of 2025 year Gold Apple opened a store in Dubai’s Mirdif City Centre. During the same time the retailer entered into the Saudi Arabian market with the launch of an e-commerce platform and a beauty store in Jeddah’s Red Sea Mall. Gold Apple was the first and so far the only Russian omnichannel retailer in the Kingdom of Saudi Arabia. The company plans further development by opening a second store in Saudi Arabia, which will become the retailer's fourth store in the Middle East. A new Saudi store will appear in the capital of Saudi Arabia, Riyadh. Thus the total retail space of the company in the MENA region will reach approximately 7,000 square meters.

As of August 2025, Gold Apple introduces consumers to a diverse selection of beauty products from Russia, Korea, Europe, and the U.S.

=== Collaboration with local artists ===
For International Lipstick Day in 2025, Gold Apple worked with MAC Cosmetics and two young Arab artists, Zaina Zayed and Yoshi (Aisha Al Ali). The project bridged global celebration with local perspective, which has come together as an art collaboration, titled “Beauty in the Details”. It reimagined lipstick not just as a tool for self-expression, but as a medium for visual storytelling. Each artwork was created using lipstick as the sole material — transforming pigment into texture, ritual into concept, and makeup into message.

A month later, Gold Apple marked Emirati Women’s Day with a collaboration with Mariam Alobeidli, a rising Emirati illustrator. For the first time, the retailer transformed its entire UAE e-commerce and digital ecosystem website, app, and banners into a living gallery of Alobeidli’s work. Her illustration celebrated the unity and creativity of Emirati women across generations, weaving heritage with a modern identity.
