= Adelina Sotnikova =

Russian figure skater (born 1996)

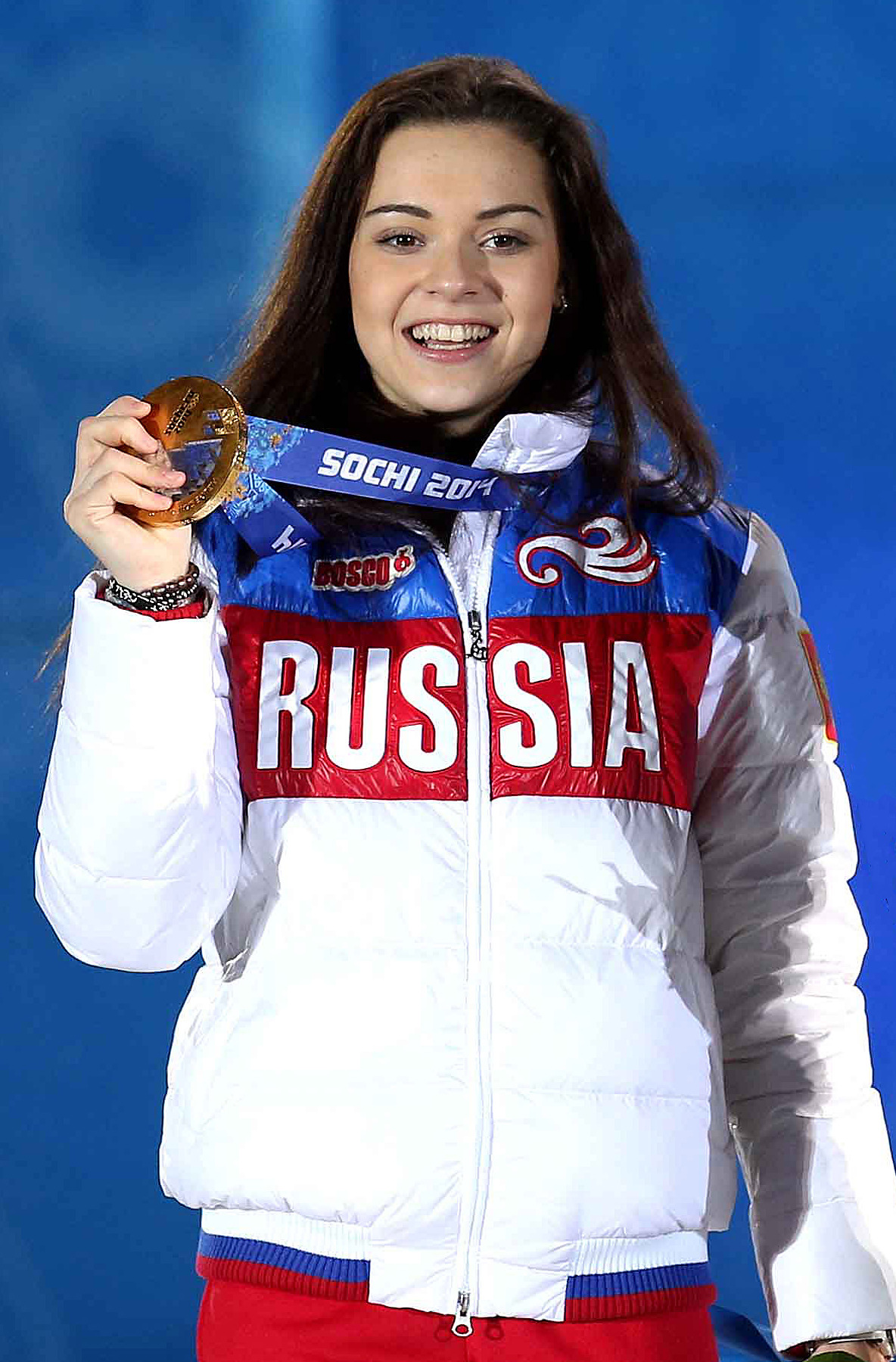
- Sotnikova at the 2014 Sochi Olympics podium

Personal information
- Native name: Аделина Дмитриевна Сотникова
- Full name: Adelina Dmitriyevna Sotnikova
- Born: 1 July 1996 (age 30) Moscow, Russia
- Height: 1.65 m (5 ft 5 in)

Figure skating career
- Country: Russia
- Coach: Evgeni Plushenko
- Skating club: CSKA Moscow
- Began skating: 2000
- Retired: 2 March 2020
Medal record
Representing Russia
Figure skating: Ladies' singles
International competitions
Event	1st	2nd	3rd
Olympic Games	1	0	0
European Championships	0	2	0
Winter Youth Olympics	0	1	0
World Junior Championships	1	0	1
Junior Grand Prix Final	1	0	0
Total	3	3	1
Olympic Games
Gold medal – first place	2014 Sochi	Ladies' singles
European Championships
Silver medal – second place	2013 Zagreb	Ladies' singles
Silver medal – second place	2014 Budapest	Ladies' singles
Russian Championships
Gold medal – first place	2009 Kazan	Ladies’ Singles
Gold medal – first place	2011 Saransk	Ladies’ Singles
Gold medal – first place	2012 Saransk	Ladies’ Singles
Gold medal – first place	2014 Sochi	Ladies’ Singles
Bronze medal – third place	2013 Sochi	Ladies’ Singles
Winter Youth Olympics
Silver medal – second place	2012 Innsbruck	Ladies' singles
World Junior Championships
Gold medal – first place	2011 Gangneung	Ladies' singles
Bronze medal – third place	2012 Minsk	Ladies' singles
Junior Grand Prix Final
Gold medal – first place	2010–11 Beijing	Ladies' singles
- Adelina Sotnikova's voice Sotnikova on the Echo of Moscow program, 1 March 2014

Adelina Dmitriyevna Sotnikova (Russian: Адели́на Дми́триевна Со́тникова Russian pronunciation: [ɐdɛˈlʲinə ˈsotnʲɪkəvə]; born 1 July 1996) is a retired Russian figure skater. She is the 2014 Olympic gold medalist in ladies' singles, a two-time European silver medalist (2012, 2013), a two-time Rostelecom Cup bronze medalist (2011, 2015), and a four-time Russian national champion (2009, 2011, 2012, 2014).

On the junior level, she is the 2012 Youth Olympic silver medalist, the 2011 Junior World champion, the 2010 Junior Grand Prix Final champion, and the 2009 Russian junior national champion. Sotnikova stopped competing after the 2015–2016 season. She announced her retirement on 1 March 2020. She later admitted that she failed a drug test during the 2014 Sochi Olympics, but that her second sample showed no signs of doping.

== Career ==
=== Early years ===
Adelina Sotnikova began skating at the age of four at the Yuzhny ice rink near her home in Moscow. Taught by Anna Patrikeeva until the age of seven, she then began training at CSKA which is further away from her home. She began working with coach Elena Buianova (Vodorezova) a year later.

During the 2008–2009 season, Sotnikova debuted at the senior level at the 2009 Russian Nationals and won the gold medal at the age of 12. One month later she also won the 2009 Russian Junior Championships.

Sotnikova was ineligible to compete on the Junior Grand Prix circuit during the 2009–2010 season because International Skating Union rules require that skaters turn 13 before 1 July in their place of birth – she was born a few hours into 1 July in Moscow. Sotnikova's mother told her that she was born a month prematurely anyway. She struggled with a growth spurt and dropped to fourth at Russian senior nationals and sixth in the junior event.

=== 2010–2011 season ===
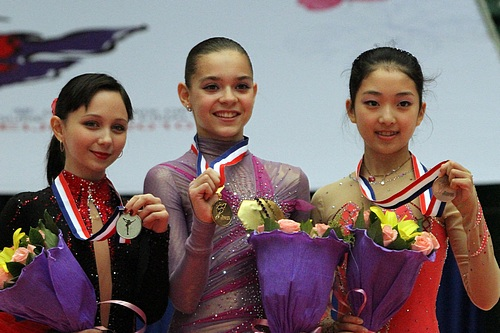
Sotnikova with medalists Elizaveta Tuktamysheva and Li Zijun at the 2010–11 JGP Final

Sotnikova made her Junior Grand Prix debut during the 2010–2011 season. She won gold medals in Austria and the U.K. and qualified for the 2010 Junior Grand Prix Final where she won the title.

At the 2011 Russian Championships, she placed second in the short program and first in the long, to win her second national title. She was assigned to the World Junior Championships where she won the gold medal ahead of teammate Elizaveta Tuktamysheva.

=== 2011–2012 season ===
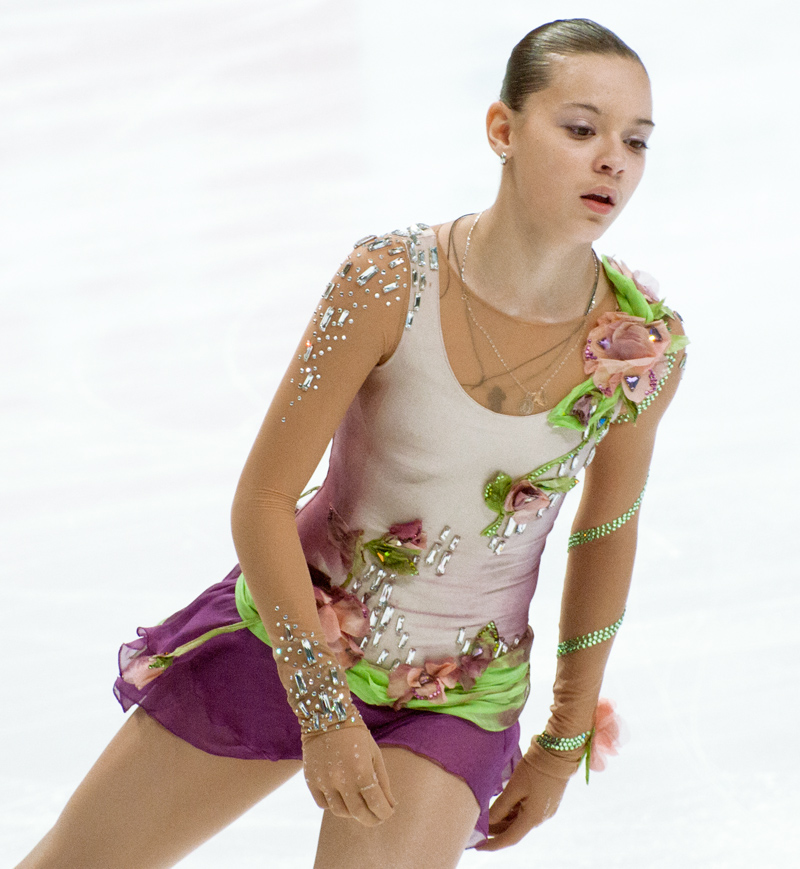
Sotnikova at 2011 Rostelecom Cup

According to ISU age rules, Sotnikova was eligible for the senior Grand Prix circuit during the 2011–2012 season, although not for senior ISU Championships. She was assigned to two Grand Prix events, the 2011 Cup of China and 2011 Rostelecom Cup. She intended to begin her season at the 2011 Ondrej Nepela Memorial but withdrew after a leg injury caused her to miss a month of off-season training. She won the bronze medal at Cup of China and at Rostelecom Cup, to become the first alternate for the ladies' event at the Grand Prix Final.

Sotnikova then competed at the 2011 Golden Spin of Zagreb and won the gold medal. At the 2012 Russian Championships, she placed first in the short program and second in the long program, to win her third national title. She then competed at the 2012 Youth Olympic Games and won the silver medal. At the 2012 World Junior Championships, she won the bronze medal behind teammate Yulia Lipnitskaya and U.S. skater Gracie Gold. Sotnikova was named to the Russian team for the 2012 ISU World Team Trophy. She finished 4th overall and posted a season's best in her free skate of 113.57 points.

=== 2012–2013 season ===
Sotnikova started her season with a silver medal at the 2012 Nebelhorn Trophy. Her first GP event of the season was the 2012 Skate America. In the free skate, Sotnikova's 3Lo-2T-2Lo jump combination received no points because it was deemed an invalid element. She won the bronze medal overall behind Americans Christina Gao and Ashley Wagner. At her next event, the 2012 Rostelecom Cup, Sotnikova finished 5th. At the 2013 Russian Championships, she won the bronze medal behind Elena Radionova and Elizaveta Tuktamysheva. At the 2013 European Championships, she placed first in the short program, third in the long program, and won the silver medal overall, 0.72 points behind gold medalist Carolina Kostner. Sotnikova and bronze medalist Elizaveta Tuktamysheva were Russia's first medalists in the Europeans ladies' event since Irina Slutskaya won the title in 2006.

After Europeans, Sotnikova performed in Art on Ice in Switzerland. She finished 9th in her World Championships debut. Appearing in her second team event, she placed fourth in ladies at the 2013 World Team Trophy. Team Russia finished 4th overall.

=== 2013–2014 season ===
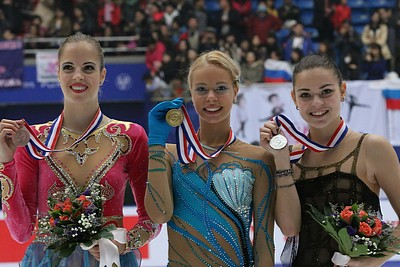
Sotnikova at the 2013 Cup of China podium

Sotnikova started her season competing with Team Europe at the 2013 Japan Open. Her first 2013–14 Grand Prix assignment was Cup of China. She placed first in the short and third in the free skate, winning the silver medal ahead of Carolina Kostner. In her next event, the 2013 Trophée Éric Bompard, she placed third in the short, first in the free skate, and won the silver medal behind American Ashley Wagner. The results qualified Sotnikova to her first Grand Prix Final. At the event in Fukuoka, Japan, she was second in the short, sixth in the free, and finished 5th overall.

At the 2014 Russian Championships, Sotnikova placed first in the short, second in the free, and won her fourth national title, edging out Yulia Lipnitskaya for the gold. Appearing in her second European Championships, Sotnikova placed first in the short and second in the free, taking the silver medal with an overall score of 202.36 points while Lipnitskaya won gold. She is the second Russian skater to record a score above the 200 mark in ladies' singles.

==== 2014 Olympic Winter Games ====
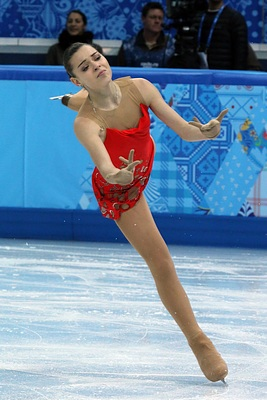
Sotnikova performing her short program at the 2014 Olympic Games

The figure skating at the 2014 Sochi Winter Olympics began with the team event. Although Russian skating officials initially intended to assign Sotnikova and Lipnitskaya to one program each, they decided a week before the event that Lipnitskaya would skate both segments.

Sotnikova won the gold medal in the ladies' individual event with an overall score of 224.59 points, becoming one of the youngest Olympic figure skating champions. She was second behind the defending Olympic and reigning World Champion Kim Yuna by 0.28 point after the short program, but overtook Kim by winning the free skate. However, Sotnikova's victory was controversial due to allegations of judges' impartiality and criticisms of the scoring system. Questions over the judges, the judging system, and the anonymity of scores were also raised in the press. In the press conference after her win at the Olympics, Sotnikova stated that she became "more motivated to win the singles competition" after not being chosen to compete in the earlier team competition. She was awarded the Order of Friendship by Vladimir Putin on 24 February 2014. Sotnikova did not participate in the 2014 World Championships held in Saitama, Japan.

=== 2014–2015 season ===
Sotnikova was selected to compete at 2014 Rostelecom Cup and 2014 NHK Trophy, but withdrew due to a torn ankle ligament. She later withdrew from the 2015 Russian Championships. While doctors had forbidden her to jump in full force, Adelina Sotnikova decided to focus on the choreographic component in appearances with Gleb Savchenko in the 2015 Russian version of Dancing with the Stars.

=== 2015–2016 season ===
Sotnikova placed 4th in the individual competition of Japan Open. She appeared at two Challenger Series events, winning the silver medal at the 2015 Mordovian Ornament behind Anna Pogorilaya and placing 6th at the 2015 Golden Spin of Zagreb. On the ISU Grand Prix, Sotnikova competed only at 2015 Rostelecom Cup, and won bronze medal behind her teammates Elena Radionova and Evgenia Medvedeva.

On 24–27 December 2015, Sotnikova competed at the 2016 Russian Championships and placed 6th. She was named only as an alternate for the 2016 European Championships.

=== From 2016 to 2023 ===
As injuries started to linger, Sotnikova did not participate at any event, domestic and international, from 2016 onwards. In April 2017, she changed coach and training location, by hiring former Olympic men's champion Evgeni Plushenko at his skating academy, Angels of Plushenko in Moscow. But her persisting health problems prevented her from performing at any competition.

While doing a skating show in Turkey during the summer of 2019, Sotnikova experienced back pain, but thought that it was manageable. However, just prior to the 2019 Rostelecom Cup exhibition gala, her spine pain persisted to the point she was considering consulting for further treatment. In December, after facing more serious pain, she was recommended surgery, but decided to delay it due to ongoing commitments, including performances of Plushenko's New Year show as Cinderella. In late February, she underwent surgery, in which she got two spinal implants connected by a metal sheet, itself fixed by six titanium screws inserted into the vertebrae.

On 1 March 2020, Sotnikova officially announced her retirement from competitive figure skating. She plans however, thanks to her surgery, to perform in skating shows in the near future.

In July 2023, Sotnikova admitted in an interview she returned a positive doping test during the year of her Olympic triumph, but insisted she was cleared by her B-sample. Sotnikova was named in the WADA-commissioned McLaren Report in December 2016 as one athlete about whom scratches indicative of tampering were found on test tubes in which urine samples were submitted, but the International Olympic Committee (IOC) cleared her of wrongdoing in November 2017 after deeming "there is no sufficient element in the evidence available to date" to establish an anti-doping rule violation. Former Moscow laboratory director turned whistleblower Grigory Rodchenkov, the main witness in the McLaren Report, said she was not part of the programme. The Russian Anti-Doping Agency told the country's state-run news agency TASS it has "no information on this issue". WADA and the IOC declined to comment.

== Television ==
She appeared in the eighth season of ice show contest Ice Age.

== Personal life ==
Sotnikova was born on 1 July 1996 in Moscow. Her father, Dmitry, is a police officer and her mother, Olga, has worked as a homemaker and in merchandising. Her sister, Maria, is two years younger and has Treacher Collins syndrome. Sotnikova credits Maria as the most influential person on her career and sees figure skating as a job to support her sister. Sotnikova attended a high school where athletes form about half the student body. In 2013, she enrolled in a sports university with a view to becoming a coach.

In 2015, Sotnikova started up a beauty salon called "Studio Be Happy" in Moscow, which was rebranded as "Studio Adelina Sotnikova" by mid-July 2019. On October 30, 2022, she gave birth to her first child, a boy she named Adrian.

== Political views ==
On 18 March 2022, Sotnikova attended Vladimir Putin's Moscow rally, which celebrated the annexation of Crimea by the Russian Federation from Ukraine and justified the Russian invasion of the country. On Instagram, she posted a video of herself singing along with Nikolay Rastorguyev, as well as other videos from the rally.

In August 2022, Sotnikova visited Russian-occupied Donbas in a publicity tour. In December 2022, the Ukrainian Parliament sanctioned Sotnikova for her support of the war.

In March 2023, she commented on the International Olympic Committee's proposal to allow Russian athletes to participate in the 2024 Summer Olympics as neutrals:

This is unfair. It's horrible. How can a person who represents his country, in order to satisfy someone there, speak against his country? This is foolish and stupid on the part of the IOC. It shouldn't be like that. I was taught all my life by my parents and coach that politics should never be mixed with sports.

== Programs ==
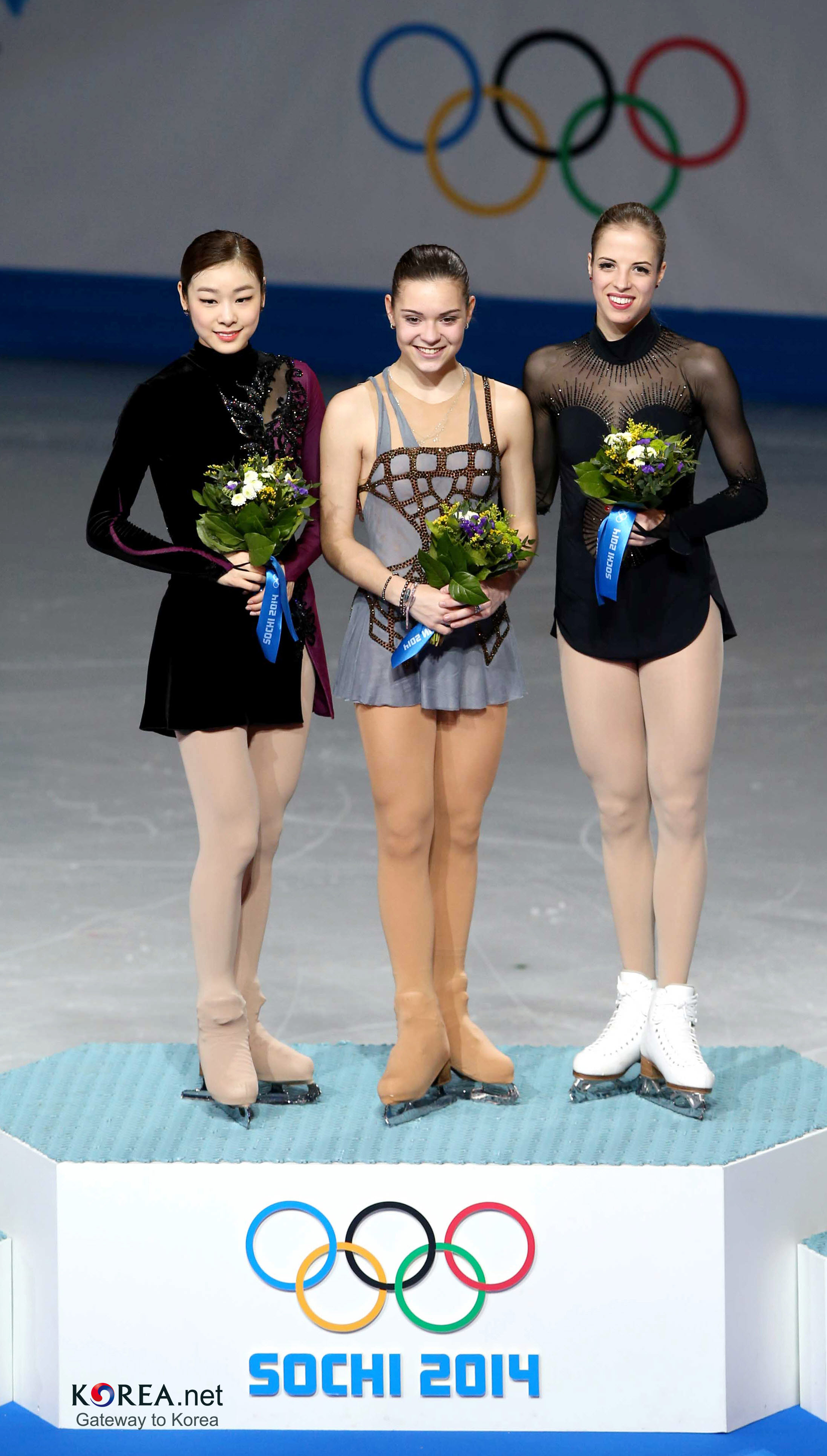
17-year-old Sotnikova at the 2014 Winter Olympics podium

Season	Short program	Free skating	Exhibition
2016–17	Suite Festiva choreo. by Peter Tchernyshev	Never Meant to Belong choreo. by Peter Tchernyshev	
2015–16	Historia de un Amor; Latin Selection choreo. by Irina Tagaeva and Peter Tchernyshev	Je suis malade by Lara Fabian choreo. by Irina Tagaeva	"Swan Lake" theme performed by David Garrett
2014–15	"Swan Lake" theme performed by David Garrett	Je suis malade by Lara Fabian choreo. by Irina Tagaeva	
2013–14	Habanera (from Carmen Suite) by Georges Bizet choreo. by Peter Tchernyshev	Introduction and Rondo Capriccioso in A Minor Op. 28 for Violin and Orchestra by Camille Saint-Saëns choreo. by Peter Tchernyshev	Oblivion by Astor Piazzolla
2012–13	Capriccio Espagnol by Nikolai Rimsky-Korsakov choreo. by Elena Buianova, Tatiana Tarasova	Tough Lover (from Burlesque) by Christina Aguilera choreo. by Elena Buianova, Tatiana Tarasova	Welcome to Burlesque (from Burlesque) by Cher
2011–12	Boléro by Maurice Ravel	Liebestraum by Franz Liszt	Hernando's Hideaway
2010–11	Waltzes by Johann Strauss II	Introduction and Rondo Capriccioso by Camille Saint-Saëns	Swan Lake by Pyotr Ilyich Tchaikovsky
2009–10	Waltzes by Johann Strauss II	Scheherazade by Nikolai Rimsky-Korsakov	Waltzes by Johann Strauss II
2008–09		Swan Lake by Pyotr Tchaikovsky	Hernando's Hideaway
2007–08		Malagueña by Ernesto Lecuona	

== Competitive highlights ==
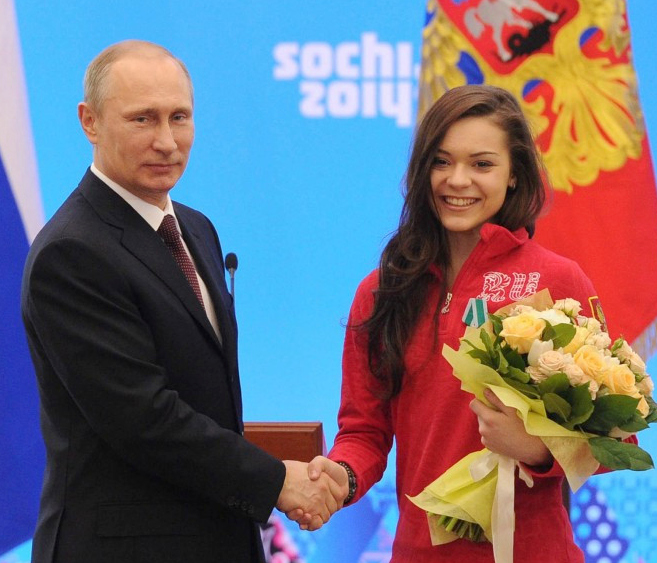
Sotnikova with President Vladimir Putin after Olympics, 24 February 2014

- GP: Grand Prix; CS: Challenger Series; JGP: Junior Grand Prix

International
Event	07–08	08–09	09–10	10–11	11–12	12–13	13–14	14–15	15–16
Olympics							1st		
Worlds						9th			
Europeans						2nd	2nd		
GP Final							5th		
GP Bompard							2nd		
GP Cup of China					3rd		2nd		
GP NHK Trophy								WD	
GP Rostelecom					3rd	5th		WD	3rd
GP Skate America						3rd			
CS Golden Spin					1st				6th
CS Mordovian									2nd
Nebelhorn						2nd			
International: Junior
Junior Worlds				1st	3rd				
Youth Olympics					2nd				
JGP Final				1st					
JGP Austria				1st					
JGP U.K				1st					
NRW Trophy	6th								
National
Russian Champ.		1st	4th	1st	1st	3rd	1st		6th
Russian Junior	10th	1st	6th						
Team events
World Team; Trophy					5th T 4th P	4th T 4th P			
Japan Open							3rd T 4th P		3rd T 4th P

== Detailed results ==
Small medals for short program and free skating awarded only at ISU Championships – Worlds, Europeans, and Junior Worlds. At team events, medals awarded for team results only.

=== Senior level ===
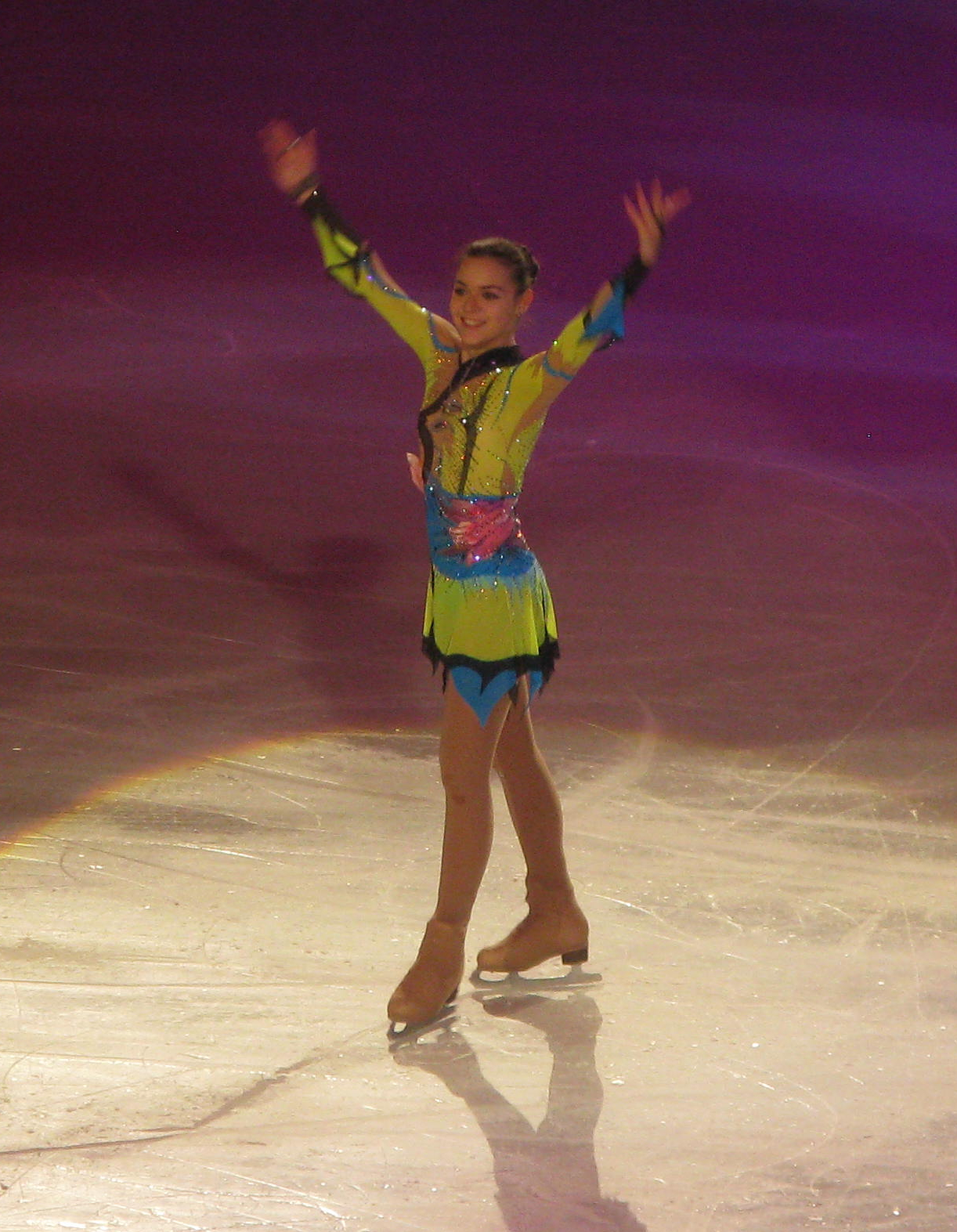
Sotnikova performing her gala at the 2013 Trophee Eric Bompard

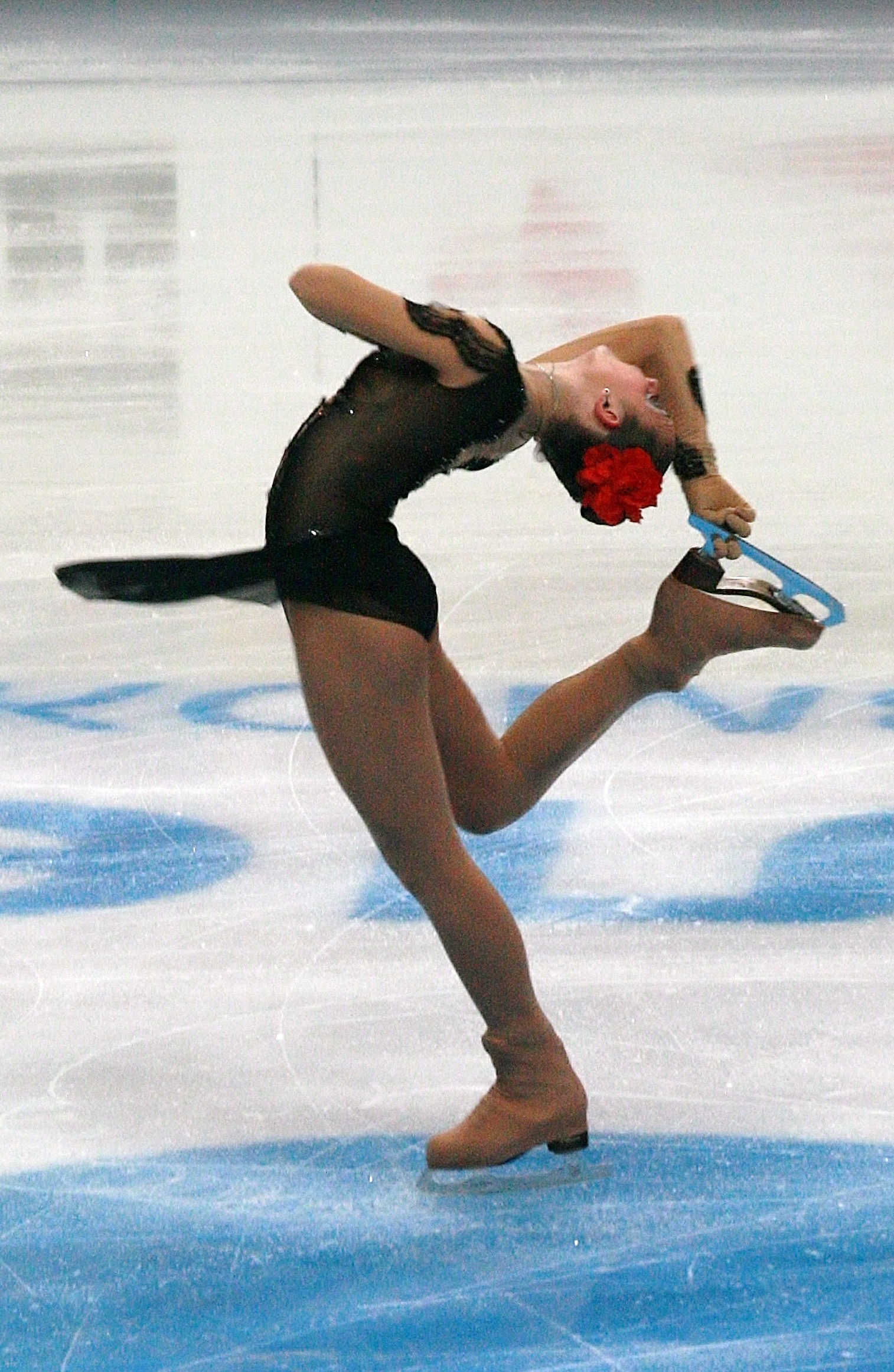
Sotnikova at the 2012 Rostelecom Cup

2015–16 season
Date	Event	SP	FS	Total
24–27 December 2015	2016 Russian Championships	6; 69.47	7; 128.51	6; 197.98
2–5 December 2015	2015 Golden Spin of Zagreb	7; 54.43	6; 105.37	6; 159.80
20–22 November 2015	2015 Rostelecom Cup	4; 65.48	3; 119.63	3; 185.11
15–18 October 2015	2015 Mordovian Ornament	1; 75.57	2; 128.32	2; 203.89
3 October 2015	2015 Japan Open	–	4; 118.81	3T
2013–14 season
Date	Event	SP	FS	Total
19–20 February 2014	2014 Winter Olympics	2; 74.64	1; 149.95	1; 224.59
15–19 January 2014	2014 European Championships	1; 70.73	2; 131.63	2; 202.36
24–26 December 2013	2014 Russian Championships	1; 72.53	2; 140.24	1; 212.77
5–8 December 2013	2013–14 Grand Prix Final	2; 68.38	6; 104.92	5; 173.30
15–17 November 2013	2013 Trophee Eric Bompard	3; 60.01	1; 129.80	2; 189.81
1–2 November 2013	2013 Cup of China	1; 66.03	3; 108.67	2; 174.70
5–7 October 2013	2013 Japan Open	–	4; 105.95	3T
2012–13 season
Date	Event	SP	FS	Total
11–14 April 2013	2013 World Team Trophy	1; 67.13	6; 115.97	4T/4P; 183.10
13–17 March 2013	2013 World Championships	8; 59.62	9; 116.36	9; 175.98
23–27 January 2013	2013 European Championships	1; 67.61	3; 126.38	2; 193.99
25–28 December 2012	2013 Russian Championships	2; 66.99	3; 123.76	3; 190.75
9–11 November 2012	2012 Rostelecom Cup	5; 57.11	7; 100.87	5; 157.98
19–21 October 2012	2012 Skate America	2; 58.93	3; 110.03	3; 168.96
27–29 September 2012	2012 Nebelhorn Trophy	1; 58.48	2; 109.75	2; 168.23
2011–12 season
Date	Event	SP	FS	Total
18–22 April 2012	2012 World Team Trophy	6; 56.12	4; 113.57	5T/4P; 169.69
25–29 December 2011	2012 Russian Championships	1; 68.65	2; 125.06	1; 193.71
8–12 December 2011	2011 Golden Spin of Zagreb	2; 51.83	1; 110.64	1; 162.47
25–27 November 2011	2011 Cup of Russia	3; 57.79	3; 111.96	3; 169.75
3–6 November 2011	2011 Cup of China	3; 53.74	3; 106.21	3; 159.95

=== Junior level ===
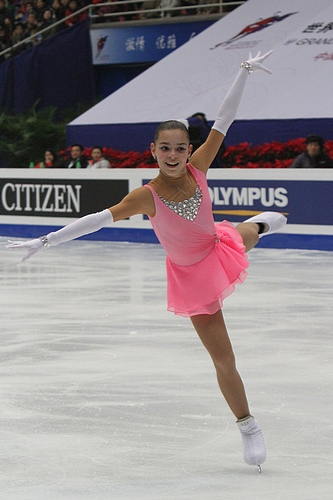
Sotnikova at the 2010–11 JGP Final

2011–12 season
Date	Event	Level	SP	FS	Total
2–3 March 2012	2012 World Junior Championships	Junior	3; 56.57	3; 111.88	3; 168.45
13–22 January 2012	2012 Winter Youth Olympics	Junior	2; 59.44	3; 99.64	2; 159.08
2010–11 season
Date	Event	Level	SP	FS	Total
1–5 March 2011	2011 World Junior Championships	Junior	1; 59.51	1; 115.45	1; 174.96
26–29 December	2011 Russian Championships	Senior	2; 63.79	1; 133.65	1; 197.44
9–12 December 2010	2010–11 JGP Final	Junior	1; 57.27	1; 112.54	1; 169.81
30 Sep – 1 October 2010	2010 JGP England	Junior	1; 59.39	1; 107.31	1; 166.70
15–19 September 2010	2010 JGP Austria	Junior	1; 61.32	1; 117.65	1; 178.97
2009–10 season
Date	Event	Level	SP	FS	Total
3–6 February 2010	2010 Russian Junior Championships	Junior	4; 57.28	6; 93.50	6; 150.78
23–27 December 2009	2010 Russian Championships	Senior	3; 59.77	4; 112.92	4; 172.69
2008–09 season
Date	Event	Level	SP	FS	Total
28–31 January 2009	2009 Russian Junior Championships	Junior	1	1	1; 170.28
24–28 December 2008	2009 Russian Championships	Senior	1	2	1; 160.55
2007–08 season
Date	Event	Level	SP	FS	Total
30 Jan – 2 February 2008	2008 Russian Junior Championships	Junior	7	13	10; 116.62
30 Nov – 2 December 2007	2007 NRW Trophy	Junior	3; 37.17	6; 59.26	6; 96.43
