= Ural State University of Economics =

University in Yekaterinburg, Russia

- Уральский государственный экономический университет
- Established: October 10, 1967
- Rector: Yakov Petrovich Silin
- Location: Ekaterinburg, Sverdlovsk Oblast, Russia
- Website: usue.ru

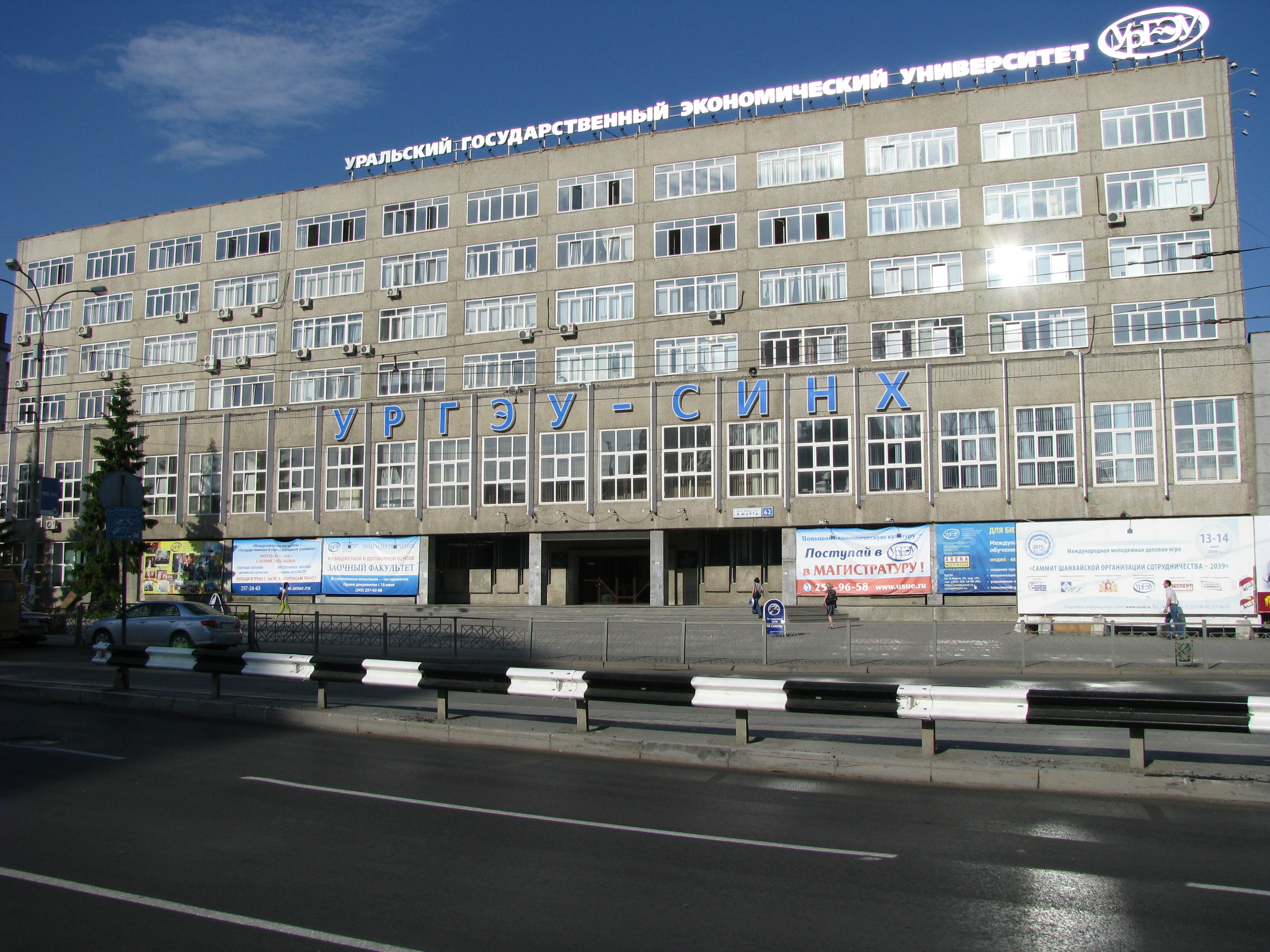
Ural State University of Economics main building in Ekaterinburg, adjacent to Geologicheskaya metro station and the local Circus

University rankings

Regional – Overall
- QS Emerging Europe and Central Asia: 301-350 (2022)

Ural State University of Economics (USUE; Russian: Уральский государственный экономический университет, УрГЭУ), is a Russian public university located in Yekaterinburg, Sverdlovsk Oblast. The university offers bachelor’s, master’s, postgraduate, and doctoral programs in more than 40 academic specialities.

The university is also known by its historical name, Sverdlovsk Institute of National Economy (Свердловский институт народного хозяйства, SINE, СИНХ), as the university adopted its current name in the post-Soviet period. USUE specializes in education and research in the fields of economics, finance, management, law, information technology, commerce, and public administration.

As of the late 2010s, the university enrolls about 13,000 students and employs approximately 600 academic staff. Since its founding, USUE has trained over 200,000 specialists. The university maintains more than 130 international cooperation agreements with institutions in over 60 countries and hosts around 3,000 international students.

== History ==
It was created on 10 October 1967 as the Sverdlovsk Institute of National Economy (Свердловский институт народного хозяйства, SINE, СИНХ) by combining a faculty from Ural State University (today Ural Federal University) and the Sverdlovsk branch of the Moscow Institute of the National Economy (today the Plekhanov Russian University of Economics).

The current head of the university is Yakov Petrovich Silin.

== Faculties ==
USUE comprises four main institutes:

- Institute of Economics – offers programs in international economic relations, international trade, and system analysis of the economy.
- Institute of Finance and Law – provides training in finance, banking, law, accounting, auditing, taxation, and investment.
- Institute of Trade, Food Technologies and Service — prepares specialists in trade, customs, tourism, hospitality, and the food and service industries.
- Institute of Management and Information Technologies – trains professionals in management, marketing, advertising, information technology, and public administration.

=== Other Divisions ===
In addition to the four institutes, USUE includes several faculties offering specialized programs and an affiliated college, which provides secondary professional education in economics, management, service, and tourism.

The university also has a preparatory faculty for foreign students, offering full-time Russian Language programs.

== Eurasian Youth Economic Forum ==
The university hosts the Eurasian Youth Economic Forum, also known as the Eurasian Economic Youth Forum (Евразийский экономический молодёжный форум), which has been held annually in Yekaterinburg since 2009 under the auspices of the university. The forum serves as a major international platform for dialogue among students, young researchers, and experts on topics related to the national and global economy, innovation, and sustainable development.

The EEYF brings together participants from Russia and abroad, including representatives of government, academia, business, and youth organizations. Over the years, the forum has involved more than 15,000 participants from over 70 countries and 66 federal subjects of the Russian Federation.

== Alumni ==
- Alla Shekhovtsova
- Edward Sandoyan
- Sergei Svetlakov

== Selected bibliographie ==
- Tatiana Suspitsyna: Adaptation of Western Economics by Russian Universities: Intercultural Travel of an Academic Field. Routledge 2005, ISBN 1-135-9233-10.

== Links ==
- (in Russian) USUE official website
