= Valentin Piseev =

Russian sports administrator (1941–2024)

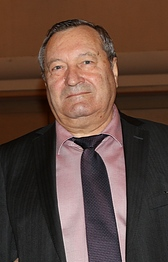
Piseev in 2017

Valentin Nikolaevich Piseev (Russian: Валентин Николаевич Писеев; 28 September 1941 – 12 August 2024) was a general director of the Figure Skating Federation of Russia (until 2014) and the member of Russian Olympic Committee. He had been the president of the Russian Figure Skating Federation (from 1992 to 2010) before becoming a director, and the president of the Figure Skating Federation of the USSR (from 1988 to 1992, till the dissolution of the Soviet Union).

== Biography ==
Piseev was born in Volokolamsk, but his mother, Anna, soon left to her home village Khotrovo. He started skating at that time. In 1948 the family moved to Moscow. Piseev continued skating at the Young Pioneers rink, where he was noticed by a figure skating coach Igor Vonzblein and invited to his skating class. He was later coached by Tatiana Tolmacheva. He didn't achieve notable results in figure skating, competing at the local and regional competitions. Piseev stopped skating due to injury. Tatiana Tolmacheva advised him to try coaching.

In 1964 he graduated from the Russian State University of Physical Education, Sport, Youth and Tourism with a qualification of Physical Education Teacher. After graduation, he worked as a coach and later as a senior coach of the Young Pioneers rink. From 1965 to 1967 Piseev headed the All-Union Board of Judges. From 1967 he was working as the secretary of the Figure Skating Federation of the USSR. Beginning in 1968 he monitored the work of other coaches.

As a figure skating judge, he was among the judge crews at the European Figure Skating Championships, World Figure Skating Championships from 1972 to 1977. He also judged the Winter Olympic Games in 1972 and 1976. From 1977 he was a part of the International Skating Union (ISU) technical committee.

In 1989 Piseev was elected the president of the Figure Skating Federation of the USSR and after its dissolution the Federation of Russia. In 2010, he decided not to participate in the next presidential election and Aleksandr Gorshkov became a new president of the Federation.

His wife Alla Shekhovtsova is a figure skating judge. She was 23 years younger than her husband. He had a daughter Kristina (born 1974) from prior marriage, and a son Stanislav (born 1989) from Alla Shekhovtsova.

Piseev died on 12 August 2024, at the age of 82.

== Orders and medals ==
- Order of Honour (1998)
- Order of Friendship of Peoples (1994)
- Medal "For Labour Valour" (1976)
- Medal "Veteran of Labour" (1990)
- Merited Coaches of the Soviet Union (1976)
- Silver Olympic Order

== Criticism ==
Before his retirement Piseev had been criticised by Anton Sikharulidze, Tatiana Tarasova and other notable figures in the figure skating world, especially after Russia's failures at the 2010 Winter Olympics. He was blamed for the confusion with Olympic accreditations, particularly because his daughter Kristina received the accreditation and was sent as an interpreter with the Russian snowboarding team, while Irina Zhuk, the coach of skaters Jana Khokhlova / Sergei Novitski, was not able to get the Olympic accreditation and had to stay in Russia.

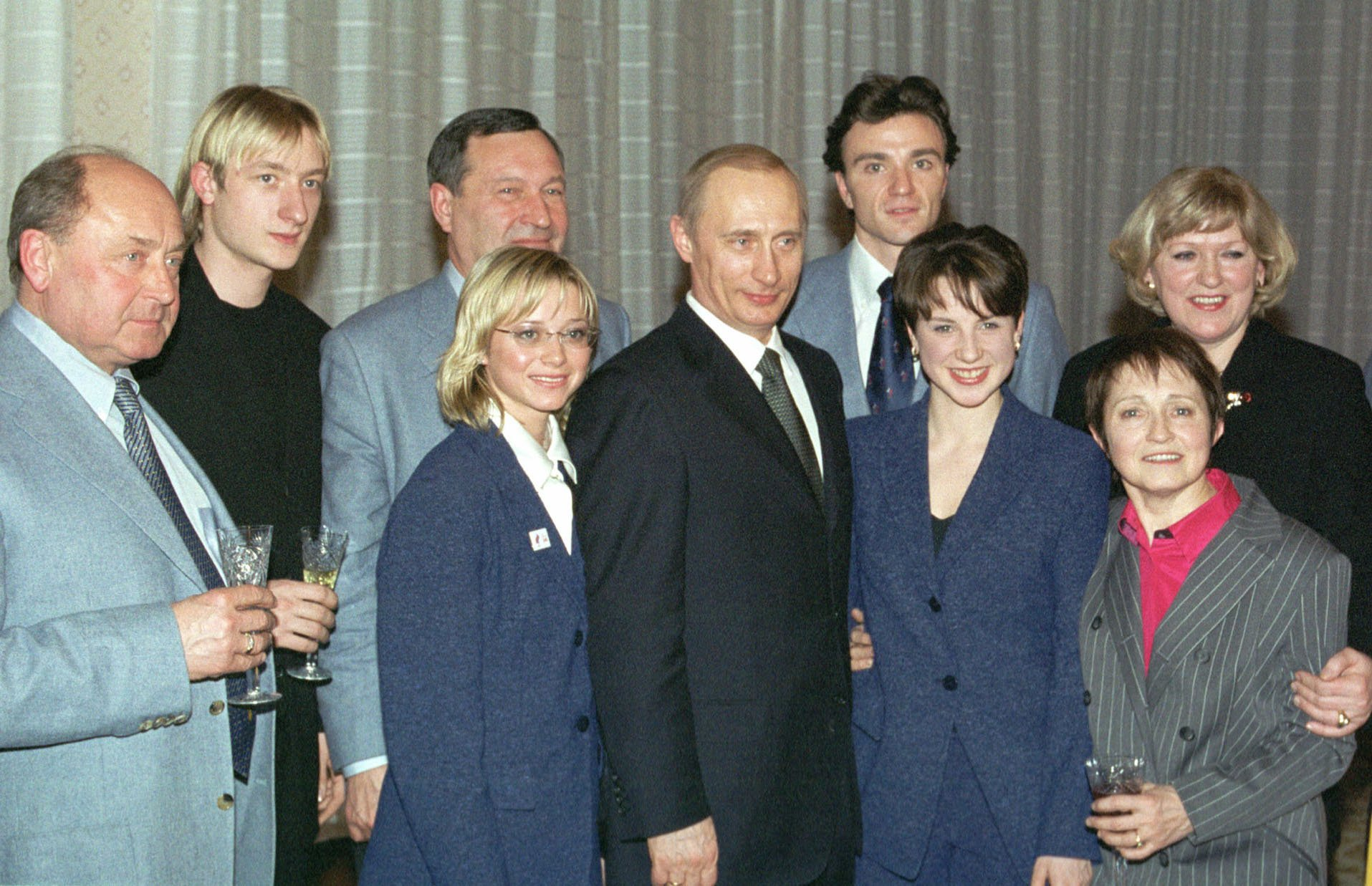
President Vladimir Putin meeting with Russian Olympic team athletes and coaches. From left to right: Alexei Mishin, Evgeni Plushenko, Valentin Piseev, Elena Berezhnaya, Vladimir Putin, Anton Sikharulidze, Irina Slutskaya, Tamara Moskvina, Zhanna Gromova.

In 2010 interview Irina Rodnina criticised Pissev for not doing his job and for expecting others "to do work for him". She also commented that he had "no authority, and no respect" among international colleagues. Elena Tchaikovskaia stated that Piseev only listened "to one adviser", which was his wife, and criticized him for making a "family business" out of figure skating. She also told that he "has hampered the work of coaches he does not like, got rid of opponents, and surrounded himself with people who agree with him".

Piseev was criticized for holding the position of the president for too long; for being too conservative; for pushing certain skaters at the expense of others and supporting only selected skaters.

Anton Sikharulidze commented on the presidential election that functions of the president were changed and "limited to representative", and the whole post turned nominal, while real power belongs to the general director. However Tatiana Tarasova approved Piseev's appointment as a general director of the Figure Skating Federation, stating he "is no friend of mine", but "not using his knowledge and international authority would be very wrong".
