= World Figure Skating Championships cumulative medal count =

Figure skating records and statistics

Medal records
- Olympic Games; World Championships; European Championships; Four Continents Championships; Grand Prix of Figure Skating
- Other events: Grand Slam; Junior Grand Slam; Golden Slam; Junior Golden Slam; Super Slam

Highest scores statistics
- Current senior; Current junior; Historical senior; Historical junior

Rankings (current and statistics)
- World Standings; Season's World Ranking

The World Figure Skating Championships are an annual figure skating competition sanctioned by the International Skating Union (ISU). The World Championships are considered the most prestigious event in figure skating. Medals are awarded in men's singles, women's singles, pair skating, and ice dance. Ulrich Salchow of Sweden currently holds the record for winning the most gold medals at the World Championships in men's singles (with ten), while Sonja Henie of Norway holds the record in women's singles (also with ten). Irina Rodnina and Alexander Zaitsev of the Soviet Union hold the record in pair skating (with six), while Rodnina won another four gold medals with her previous partner Alexei Ulanov, and thus holds the record for the most gold medals won by an individual skater in pair skating (with ten). Lyudmila Pakhomova and Aleksandr Gorshkov, also of the Soviet Union, hold the record for winning the most gold medals in ice dance (with six). Guillaume Cizeron of France also won record six gold medals won in ice dance, but with different partners.

== Men's singles ==
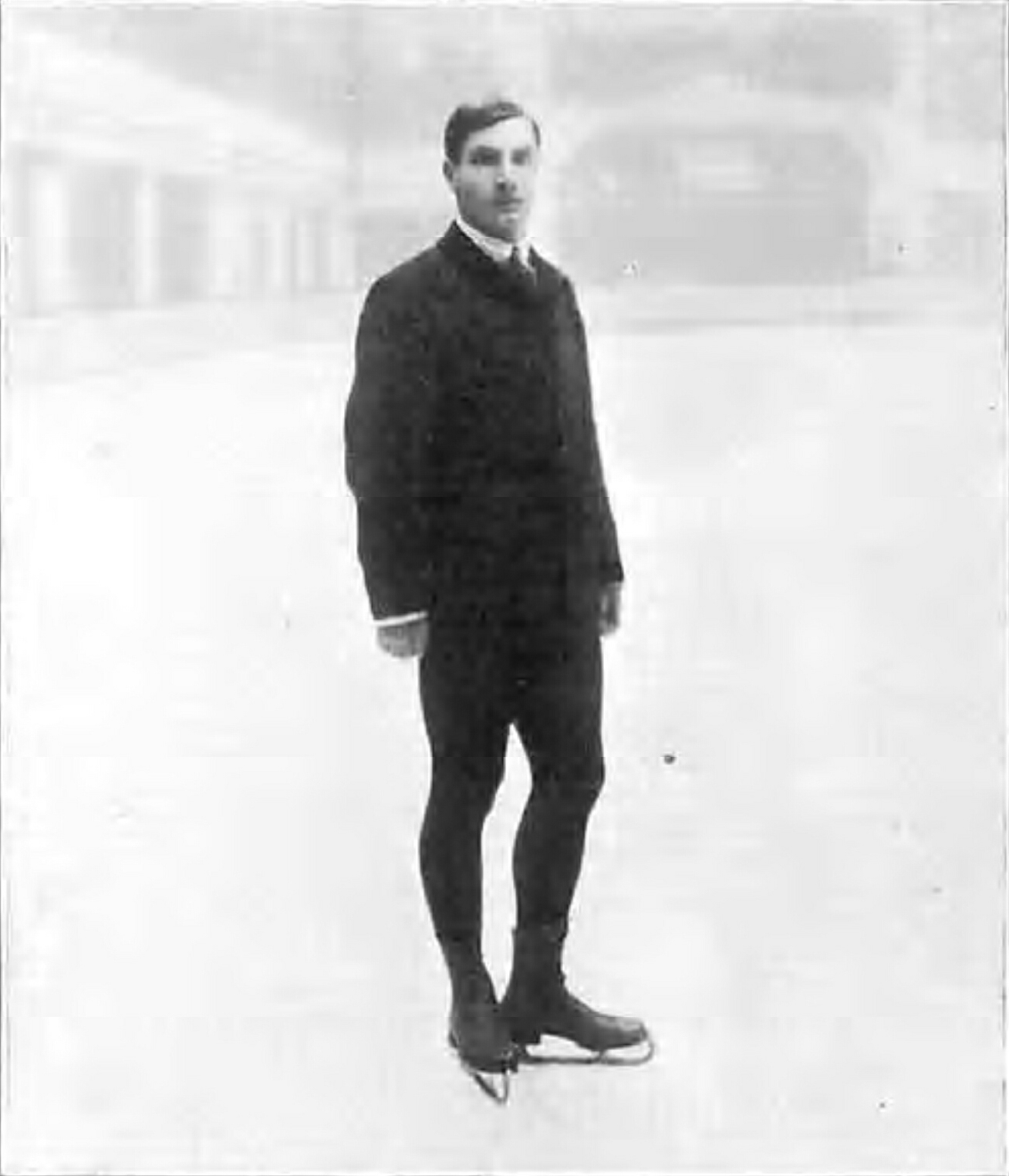
Ulrich Salchow of Sweden is the most decorated figure skater at the World Championships, with ten gold medals and three silver medals.

The men's event was first held in 1896 in Saint Petersburg, Russia, and is the oldest discipline at the World Championships. Until 1902, men and women were able to compete in the same event (open singles). Since 1903, only men could compete in this event.

Ulrich Salchow of Sweden has won the most gold medals in men's singles (with ten), and also the most medals overall (with thirteen). He won ten gold medals in a row; however, this feat was not achieved at back-to-back events, as he did not compete at the 1906 World Championships. The record for most back-to-back titles is held by Karl Schäfer of Austria (with seven). The most silver medals were won by James Grogan of the United States, Yuma Kagiyama of Japan, and Brian Orser of Canada (with four each), while Alexandre Fadeev of the Soviet Union, Jan Hoffmann of East Germany, and Andor Szende of Hungary share the record for winning the most bronze medals (with three each).

=== Total medal count by nation ===
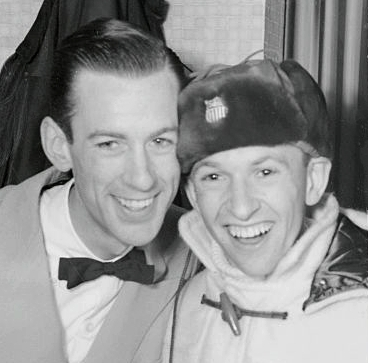
Hayes Alan Jenkins (left) and his brother David (right) of the United States won a combined seven gold medals and four bronze medals in men's singles.

- Countries or entities that can no longer participate are indicated in italics with a dagger (†).
- At the 1900 and 1901 World Championships, only two competitors participated in the men's singles event, so no bronze medals were awarded.
- In 1902, Madge Syers of Great Britain won a silver medal in the open singles event; this medal is included on the men's table.

Number of World Championship medals in men's singles by nation
| Rank | Nation | Gold | Silver | Bronze | Total |
|---|---|---|---|---|---|
| 1 | United States | 29 | 21 | 21 | 71 |
| 2 | Austria | 22 | 16 | 15 | 53 |
| 3 | Sweden | 15 | 4 | 3 | 22 |
| 4 | Canada | 14 | 13 | 6 | 33 |
| 5 | Russia † (Note: Skaters from Russia have been banned from competing at all international skating events since 2022 due to the 2022 Russian invasion of Ukraine.) | 7 | 4 | 6 | 17 |
| 6 | Japan | 5 | 13 | 7 | 25 |
| 7 | Soviet Union † | 4 | 7 | 7 | 18 |
| 8 | France | 3 | 7 | 10 | 20 |
| 9 | Czechoslovakia † | 3 | 3 | 1 | 7 |
| 10 | Switzerland | 3 | 1 | 2 | 6 |
| 11 | Germany | 2 | 9 | 9 | 20 |
| 12 | Great Britain | 2 | 8 | 5 | 15 |
| 13 | East Germany † | 2 | 2 | 4 | 8 |
| 14 | Spain | 2 | 0 | 2 | 4 |
| 15 | West Germany † | 1 | 2 | 1 | 4 |
| 16 | CIS † (Note: The Commonwealth of Independent States (CIS) was formed following the dissolution of the Soviet Union in 1991.) | 1 | 0 | 0 | 1 |
| 17 | Hungary | 0 | 2 | 6 | 8 |
| 18 | Kazakhstan | 0 | 2 | 1 | 3 |
| 19 | South Korea | 0 | 1 | 0 | 1 |
| 20 | China | 0 | 0 | 2 | 2 |
| 21 | Finland | 0 | 0 | 1 | 1 |
| 21 | Italy | 0 | 0 | 1 | 1 |
| 21 | Norway | 0 | 0 | 1 | 1 |
| 21 | Poland | 0 | 0 | 1 | 1 |
| 21 | Ukraine | 0 | 0 | 1 | 1 |
| Totals (25 entries) | | 115 | 115 | 113 | 343 |

=== Most gold medals by skater ===
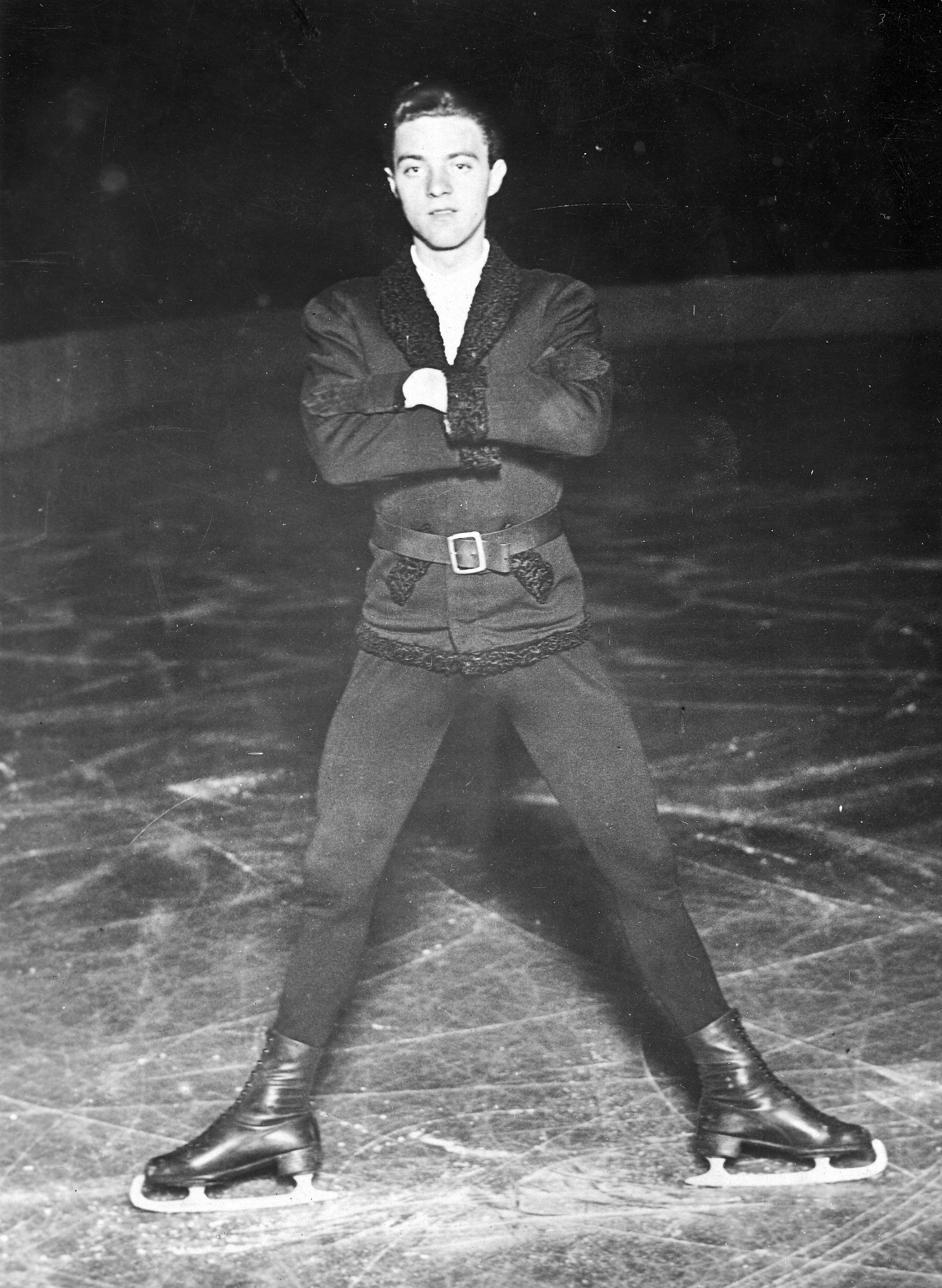
Karl Schäfer of Austria won seven gold medals in men's singles at the World Championships.

- If the number of gold medals is identical, the silver and bronze medals are used as tie-breakers (in that order).
- The table only shows the period from the first to the last won medal, not all participation at the World Championships.

Top 10 ranking of men's singles skaters by the most gold medals won at the World Championships
| No. | Skater | Nation | Period | Gold medal – first place | Silver medal – second place | Bronze medal – third place | Total | Ref. |
|---|---|---|---|---|---|---|---|---|
| 1 | Ulrich Salchow | Sweden | 1897–1911 | 10 | 3 | – | 13 | |
| 2 | Karl Schäfer | Austria | 1927–1936 | 7 | 2 | 1 | 10 | |
| 3 | Dick Button | United States | 1947–1952 | 5 | 1 | – | 6 | |
| 4 | Willy Böckl | Austria | 1913–1928 | 4 | 3 | 2 | 9 | |
| 5 | Alexei Yagudin | Russia | 1997–2002 | 4 | 1 | 1 | 6 | |
| 6 | Kurt Browning | Canada | 1989–1993 | 4 | 1 | – | 5 | |
| 7 | Hayes Alan Jenkins | United States | 1950–1956 | 4 | – | 2 | 6 | |
| 8 | Scott Hamilton | United States | 1981–1984 | 4 | – | – | 4 | |
| 9 | Fritz Kachler | Austria | 1911–1925 | 3 | 3 | 1 | 7 | |
| 10 | Elvis Stojko | Canada | 1992–2000 | 3 | 2 | 1 | 6 | |

=== Most total medals by skater ===
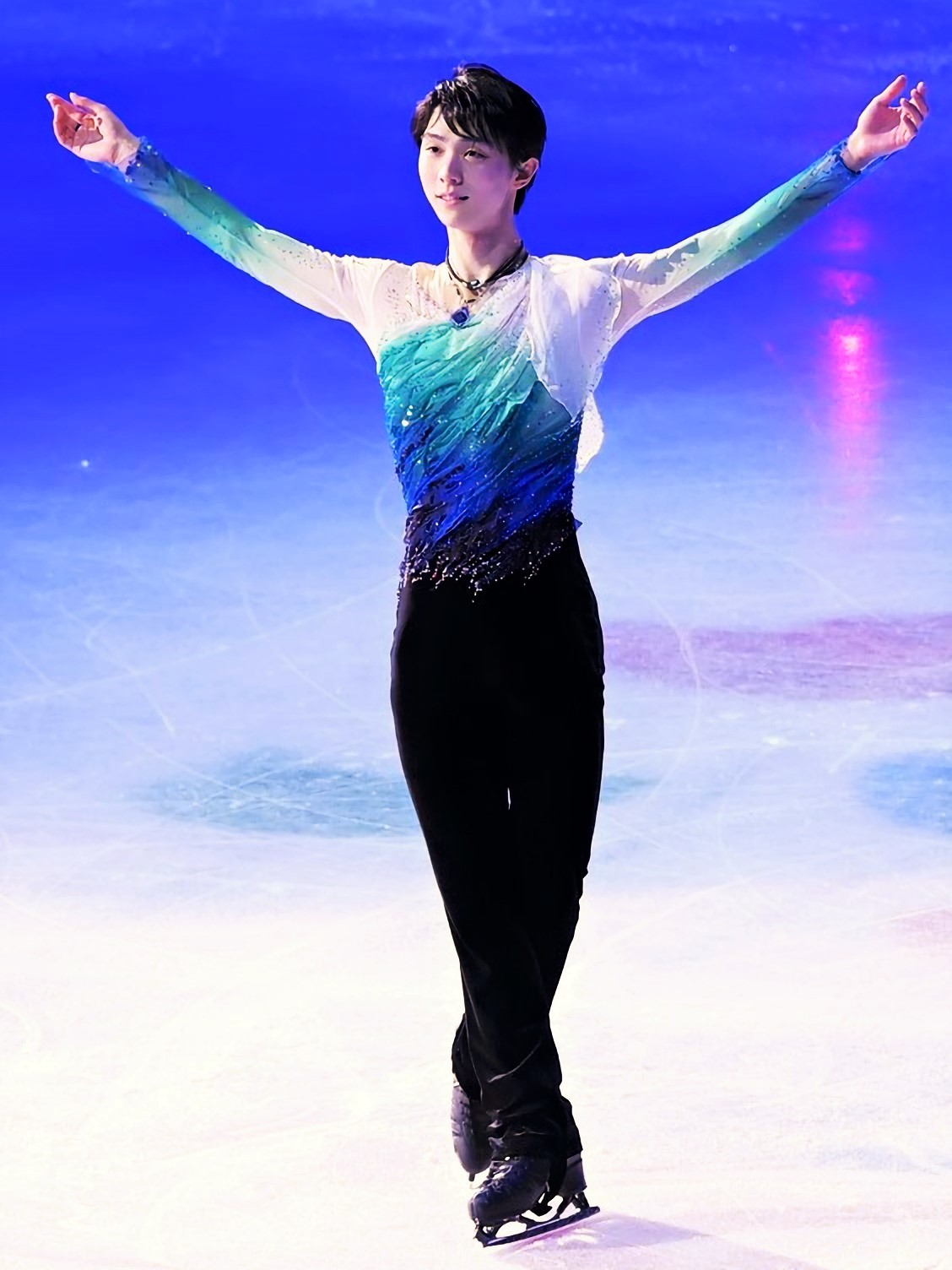
Yuzuru Hanyu of Japan is the only figure skater to win seven World Championship medals in the 21st century.

- If the total number of medals is identical, the gold, silver and bronze medals are used as tie-breakers (in that order).
- The table only shows the period from the first to the last won medal, not all participation at the World Championships.

Top 10 ranking of men's singles skaters by the most medals won at the World Championships
| No. | Skater | Nation | Period | Gold medal – first place | Silver medal – second place | Bronze medal – third place | Total | Ref. |
|---|---|---|---|---|---|---|---|---|
| 1 | Ulrich Salchow | Sweden | 1897–1911 | 10 | 3 | – | 13 | |
| 2 | Karl Schäfer | Austria | 1927–1936 | 7 | 2 | 1 | 10 | |
| 3 | Willy Böckl | Austria | 1913–1928 | 4 | 3 | 2 | 9 | |
| 4 | Fritz Kachler | Austria | 1911–1925 | 3 | 3 | 1 | 7 | |
| 5 | Yuzuru Hanyu | Japan | 2012–2021 | 2 | 3 | 2 | 7 | |
| 6 | Jan Hoffmann | East Germany | 1973–1980 | 2 | 2 | 3 | 7 | |
| 7 | Dick Button | United States | 1947–1952 | 5 | 1 | – | 6 | |
| 8 | Alexei Yagudin | Russia | 1997–2002 | 4 | 1 | 1 | 6 | |
| 9 | Hayes Alan Jenkins | United States | 1950–1956 | 4 | – | 2 | 6 | |
| 10 | Elvis Stojko | Canada | 1992–2000 | 3 | 2 | 1 | 6 | |

== Women's singles ==
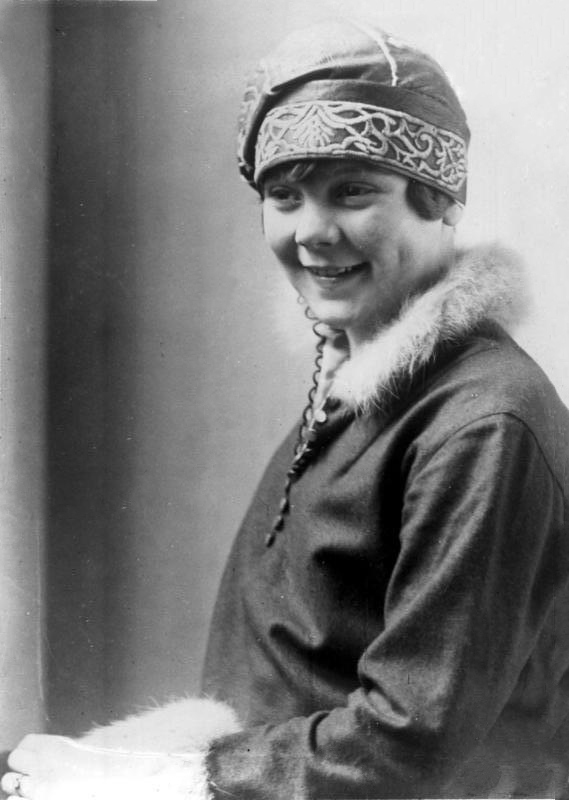
Sonja Henie of Norway is the most decorated skater at the World Championships in women's singles. She won ten gold medals and one silver medal.

After the exclusion of female skaters from the open singles event at the World Championships in 1902, the International Skating Union established a separate second-class competition for women called the ISU Championships, which were first held in 1906 in Davos, Switzerland. The first combined World Championships for men, women, and pairs took place in 1930 in New York City.

Sonja Henie of Norway has won the most gold medals in women's singles (with ten), and also the most medals overall (with eleven), which is also the longest winning streak at back-to-back events in this discipline. Six skaters share the record for winning the most silver medals (with three each): Surya Bonaly of France, Regine Heitzer of Austria, Michelle Kwan of the United States, Gabriele Seyfert of East Germany, Irina Slutskaya from Russia, and Megan Taylor of Great Britain. Vivi-Anne Hultén of Sweden and Carolina Kostner of Italy are tied for winning the most bronze medals (also with three each).

=== Total medal count by nation ===
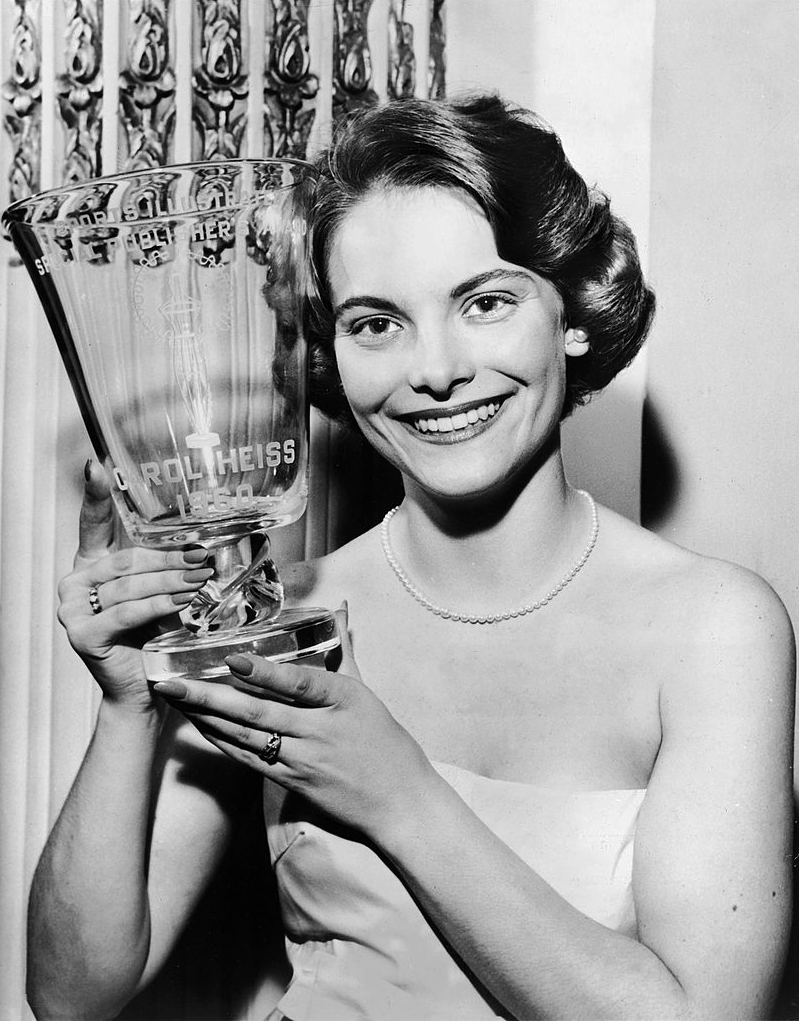
Carol Heiss of the United States was the first women's singles skater in the post-war era to win five gold medals at the World Championships.

- Countries or entities that can no longer participate are indicated in italics with a dagger (†).
- At the 1908 and 1910 World Championships, only two competitors participated in the women's singles event, so no bronze medals were awarded.
- At the 1909 World Championships, Lily Kronberger from Hungary was the only competitor and winner of the gold medal. No silver or bronze medals were awarded.

Number of World Championship medals in women's singles by nation
| Rank | Nation | Gold | Silver | Bronze | Total |
|---|---|---|---|---|---|
| 1 | United States | 27 | 23 | 25 | 75 |
| 2 | Japan | 12 | 7 | 8 | 27 |
| 3 | Norway | 10 | 1 | 2 | 13 |
| 4 | East Germany † | 9 | 8 | 2 | 19 |
| 5 | Austria | 7 | 17 | 12 | 36 |
| 6 | Russia † | 7 | 6 | 7 | 20 |
| 7 | Hungary | 7 | 1 | 3 | 11 |
| 8 | Great Britain | 6 | 9 | 7 | 22 |
| 9 | Canada | 5 | 6 | 5 | 16 |
| 10 | Netherlands | 4 | 1 | 3 | 8 |
| 11 | South Korea | 2 | 3 | 3 | 8 |
| 12 | Czechoslovakia † | 2 | 0 | 3 | 5 |
| 13 | France | 1 | 4 | 2 | 7 |
| 14 | West Germany † | 1 | 4 | 1 | 6 |
| 15 | Italy | 1 | 2 | 4 | 7 |
| 16 | China | 1 | 1 | 2 | 4 |
| 17 | FSR † (Note: In 2021, in accordance with a ban by the World Anti-Doping Agency and a decision by the Court of Arbitration for Sport, skaters from Russia were not permitted to use the Russian name, flag, or anthem; they instead participated under the name and modified flag of the Figure Skating Federation of Russia (FSR).) | 1 | 1 | 1 | 3 |
| 18 | Switzerland | 1 | 0 | 0 | 1 |
| 18 | Ukraine | 1 | 0 | 0 | 1 |
| 20 | Germany | 0 | 4 | 3 | 7 |
| 21 | Sweden | 0 | 2 | 5 | 7 |
| 22 | Soviet Union † | 0 | 2 | 1 | 3 |
| 23 | Belgium | 0 | 1 | 2 | 3 |
| 24 | Kazakhstan | 0 | 1 | 0 | 1 |
| 25 | Finland | 0 | 0 | 1 | 1 |
| Totals (25 entries) | | 105 | 104 | 102 | 311 |

=== Most gold medals by skater ===
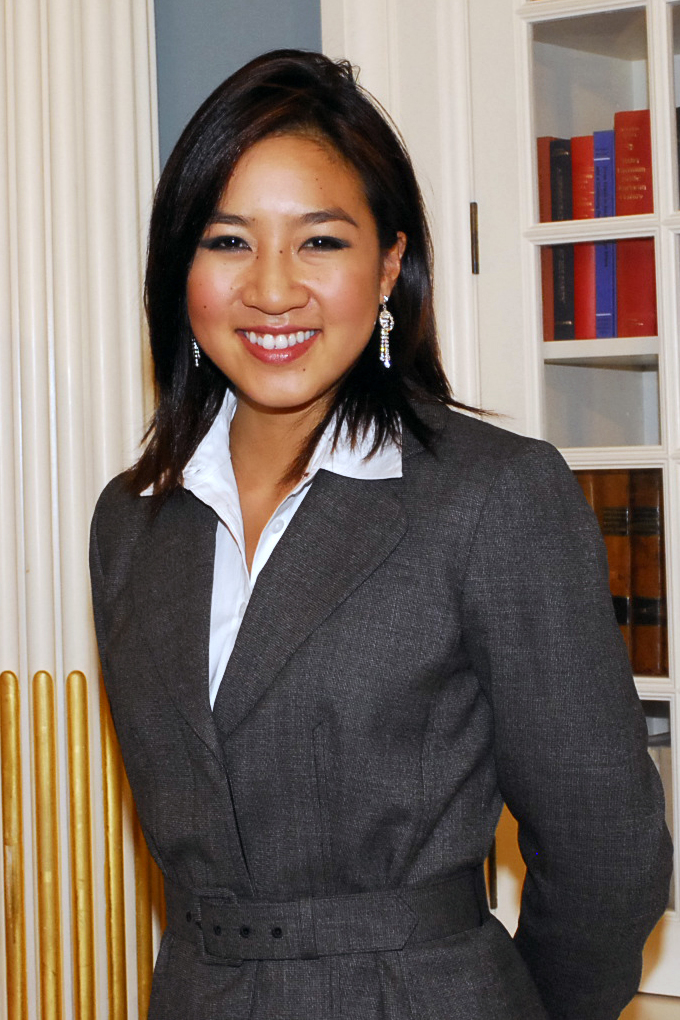
With five gold medals and nine medals total, Michelle Kwan of the United States is the most successful skater in women's singles at the World Championships in the post-war era.

- If the number of gold medals is identical, the silver and bronze medals are used as tie-breakers (in that order). If all numbers are the same, the skaters receive the same placement and are sorted in alphabetical order.
- The table only shows the period from the first to the last won medal, not all participation at the World Championships.

Top 10 ranking of women's singles skaters by the most gold medals won at the World Championships
| No. | Skater | Nation | Period | Gold medal – first place | Silver medal – second place | Bronze medal – third place | Total | Ref. |
|---|---|---|---|---|---|---|---|---|
| 1 | Sonja Henie | Norway | 1926–1936 | 10 | 1 | – | 11 | |
| 2 | Michelle Kwan | United States | 1996–2004 | 5 | 3 | 1 | 9 | |
| 3 | Carol Heiss | United States | 1955–1960 | 5 | 1 | – | 6 | |
| 3 | Herma Szabo | Austria | 1922–1927 | 5 | 1 | – | 6 | |
| 5 | Katarina Witt | East Germany | 1982–1988 | 4 | 2 | – | 6 | |
| 6 | Kaori Sakamoto | Japan | 2022–2026 | 4 | 1 | – | 5 | |
| 7 | Lily Kronberger | Hungary | 1906–1911 | 4 | – | 2 | 6 | |
| 8 | Mao Asada | Japan | 2007–2014 | 3 | 1 | 1 | 5 | |
| 8 | Sjoukje Dijkstra | Netherlands | 1959–1964 | 3 | 1 | 1 | 5 | |
| 10 | Opika von Méray Horváth | Hungary | 1911–1914 | 3 | 1 | – | 4 | |

=== Most total medals by skater ===
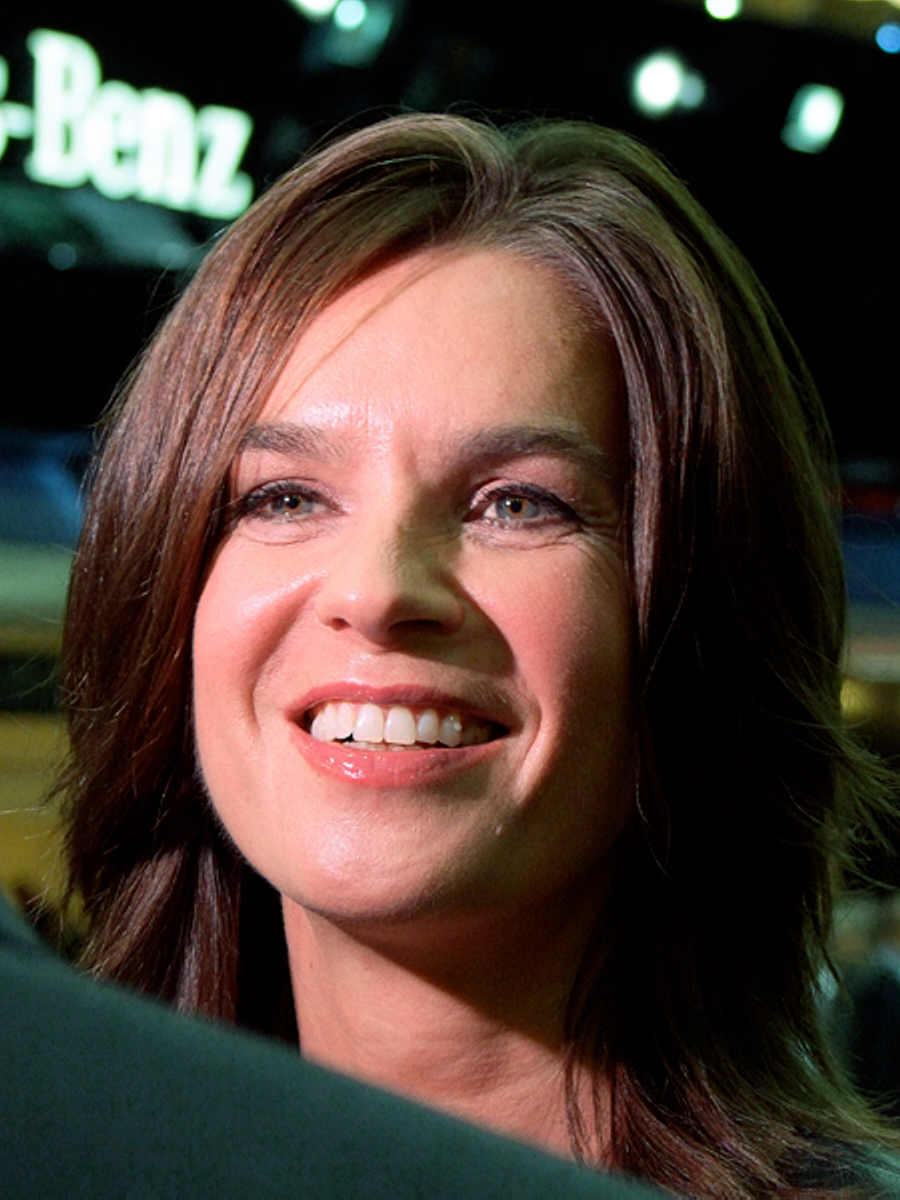
Katarina Witt of East Germany won six total medals in women's singles at the World Championships.

- If the total number of medals is identical, the gold, silver and bronze medals are used as tie-breakers (in that order). If all numbers are the same, the skaters receive the same placement and are sorted in alphabetical order.
- The table only shows the period from the first to the last won medal, not all participation at the World Championships.

Top 10 ranking of women's singles skaters by the most medals won at the World Championships
| No. | Skater | Nation | Period | Gold medal – first place | Silver medal – second place | Bronze medal – third place | Total | Ref. |
|---|---|---|---|---|---|---|---|---|
| 1 | Sonja Henie | Norway | 1926–1936 | 10 | 1 | – | 11 | |
| 2 | Michelle Kwan | United States | 1996–2004 | 5 | 3 | 1 | 9 | |
| 3 | Carol Heiss | United States | 1955–1960 | 5 | 1 | – | 6 | |
| 3 | Herma Szabo | Austria | 1922–1927 | 5 | 1 | – | 6 | |
| 5 | Katarina Witt | East Germany | 1982–1988 | 4 | 2 | – | 6 | |
| 6 | Lily Kronberger | Hungary | 1906–1911 | 4 | – | 2 | 6 | |
| 7 | Irina Slutskaya | Russia | 1996–2005 | 2 | 3 | 1 | 6 | |
| 8 | Yuna Kim | South Korea | 2007–2013 | 2 | 2 | 2 | 6 | |
| 9 | Carolina Kostner | Italy | 2005–2014 | 1 | 2 | 3 | 6 | |
| 10 | Kaori Sakamoto | Japan | 2022–2026 | 4 | 1 | – | 5 | |

== Pairs ==
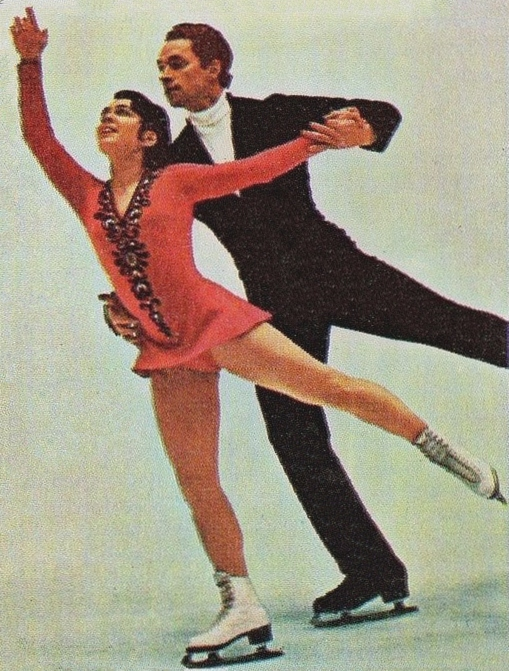
Irina Rodnina of the Soviet Union (left) won ten gold medals at the World Championships in pair skating, four of which were with Alexei Ulanov (right).

The first separate pair skating event was held in 1908 in Saint Petersburg, Russia. The first combined World Championships for men, women, and pairs took place in 1930 in New York City.

Irina Rodnina and Alexander Zaitsev of the Soviet Union hold the record for winning the most gold medals in pair skating, as well as the longest winning streak at back-to-back World Championships (with six). Rodnina won another four gold medals with her previous partner, Alexei Ulanov, and was undefeated at ten World Championships in a row. Two teams share the record for total medals won (with eight each): Ludmila Belousova and Oleg Protopopov of the Soviet Union, and Aljona Savchenko and Robin Szolkowy of Germany; Savchenko won another three medals with Bruno Massot, and holds the record for the most total medals won by an individual skater in pair skating (with eleven). Ilse and Erik Pausin of Austria and Germany won the most silver medals (with five). Lyudmila Smirnova of the Soviet Union won five silver medals as well, but with two partners. Three pairs teams share the record for the most bronze medals (with three each): Cynthia and Ronald Kauffman of the United States, Marianna and László Nagy of Hungary, and Pang Qing and Tong Jian of China. Todd Sand of the United States and Eric Radford of Canada also won three bronze medals, but each with different partners.

=== Total medal count by nation ===
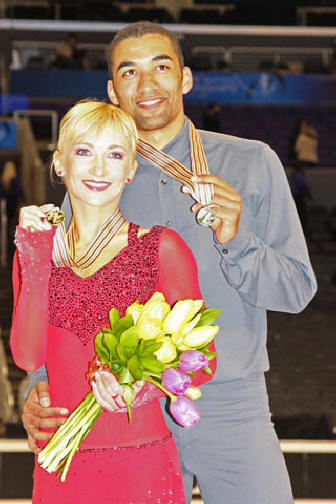
With five gold medals and eight medals total, Aljona Savchenko and Robin Szolkowy of Germany are the most successful pairs skaters at the World Championships in the 21st century.

- Countries or entities that can no longer participate are indicated in italics with a dagger (†).
- At the 1910 and 1911 World Championships, Ludowika Eilers and Walter Jakobsson competed as a pair representing two countries (Eilers for Germany and Jakobsson for Finland). Their results count individually for each country on the total medal table.
- At the 1911 World Championships, Eilers and Jakobsson were the only competitors in the pairs event, so no silver or bronze medals were awarded.

Number of World Championship medals in pair skating by nation
| Rank | Nation | Gold | Silver | Bronze | Total |
|---|---|---|---|---|---|
| 1 | Soviet Union † | 24 | 19 | 8 | 51 |
| 2 | Germany | 15 | 8 | 8 | 31 |
| 3 | Canada | 13 | 7 | 13 | 33 |
| 4 | Russia † | 8 | 11 | 10 | 29 |
| 5 | Austria | 7 | 13 | 7 | 27 |
| 6 | China | 7 | 10 | 5 | 22 |
| 7 | Hungary | 5 | 3 | 5 | 13 |
| 8 | West Germany † | 4 | 3 | 4 | 11 |
| 9 | France | 4 | 1 | 2 | 7 |
| 10 | United States | 3 | 7 | 17 | 27 |
| 11 | Finland | 3 | 4 | 0 | 7 |
| 12 | Great Britain | 3 | 3 | 5 | 11 |
| 13 | Japan | 2 | 2 | 1 | 5 |
| 14 | Belgium | 2 | 0 | 1 | 3 |
| 15 | East Germany † | 1 | 6 | 6 | 13 |
| 16 | FSR † | 1 | 0 | 1 | 2 |
| 17 | CIS † | 1 | 0 | 0 | 1 |
| 17 | Czech Republic | 1 | 0 | 0 | 1 |
| 19 | Czechoslovakia † | 0 | 2 | 1 | 3 |
| 20 | Sweden | 0 | 1 | 3 | 4 |
| 21 | Norway | 0 | 1 | 2 | 3 |
| 22 | Georgia | 0 | 1 | 0 | 1 |
| 22 | Switzerland | 0 | 1 | 0 | 1 |
| 24 | Italy | 0 | 0 | 2 | 2 |
| 25 | Poland | 0 | 0 | 1 | 1 |
| Totals (25 entries) | | 104 | 103 | 102 | 309 |

=== Most gold medals by pairs team ===
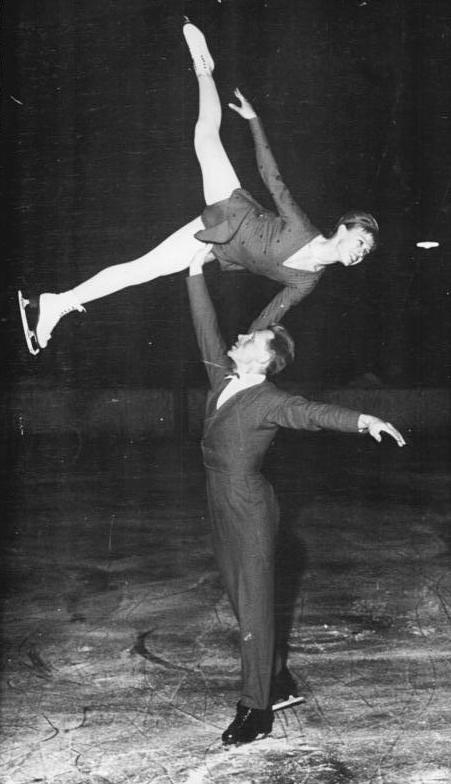
Ludmilla Belousova and Oleg Protopopov of the Soviet Union were the first pairs team to win eight medals at the World Championships.

- Only pair results are included in the list. Individual results in case of partner changes are marked with a note or listed separately below the table.
- If the number of gold medals is identical, the silver and bronze medals are used as tie-breakers (in that order). If all numbers are the same, the pairs receive the same placement and are sorted in alphabetical order by the female partner's last name.
- The table only shows the period from the first to the last won medal, not all participation at the World Championships.
- If a skater or pair has competed for multiple countries, countries are listed in chronological order (from first to last).

Top 10 ranking of pairs skaters by the most gold medals won at the World Championships
| No. | Female partner | Male partner | Nation | Period | Gold medal – first place | Silver medal – second place | Bronze medal – third place | Total | Ref. |
|---|---|---|---|---|---|---|---|---|---|
| 1 | Irina Rodnina | Alexander Zaitsev | Soviet Union | 1973–1978 | 6 | – | – | 6 | |
| 2 | Aljona Savchenko (Note: Aljona Savchenko won another gold medal, silver medal, and bronze medal with Bruno Massot (2016–2018), earning six gold medals and eleven overall medals in total.) | Robin Szolkowy | Germany | 2007–2014 | 5 | 2 | 1 | 8 | |
| 3 | Ludmila Belousova | Oleg Protopopov | Soviet Union | 1962–1969 | 4 | 3 | 1 | 8 | |
| 4 | Andrée Brunet (née Joly) | Pierre Brunet | France | 1925–1932 | 4 | 1 | – | 5 | |
| 4 | Ekaterina Gordeeva | Sergei Grinkov | Soviet Union | 1986–1990 | 4 | 1 | – | 5 | |
| 4 | Emília Rotter | László Szollás | Hungary | 1931–1935 | 4 | 1 | – | 5 | |
| 7 | Maxi Herber | Ernst Baier | Germany | 1934–1939 | 4 | – | 1 | 5 | |
| 8 | Irina Rodnina | Alexei Ulanov (Note: Alexei Ulanov won another two silver medals with Lyudmila Smirnova (1973–1974), earning six world medals in total.) | Soviet Union | 1969–1972 | 4 | – | – | 4 | |
| 8 | Barbara Wagner | Robert Paul | Canada | 1957–1960 | 4 | – | – | 4 | |
| 10 | Ludowika Jakobsson (née Eilers) | Walter Jakobsson | (German Empire) Germany & Finland (Note: Prior to their marriage in 1911, Ludowika Eilers from Germany and Walter Jakobsson from Finland competed as a pair representing two countries at two World Championships.); Finland | 1910–1923 | 3 | 4 | – | 7 | |

=== Most total medals by pairs team ===
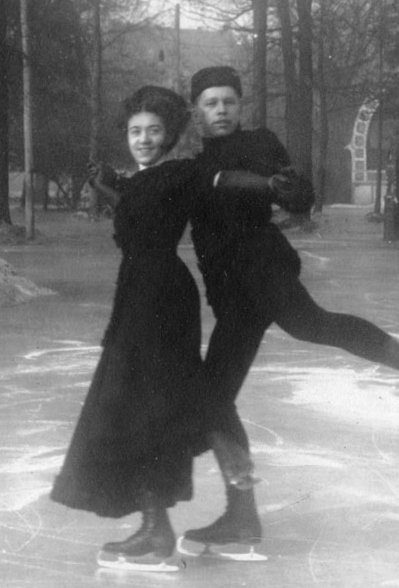
Ludowika and Walter Jakobsson of Germany and Finland won a total of seven medals at the World Championships in pair skating.

- Only pair results are included in the list. Individual results in case of partner changes are marked with a note or listed separately below the table.
- If the total number of medals is identical, the gold, silver and bronze medals are used as tie-breakers (in that order). If all numbers are the same, the pairs receive the same placement and are sorted in alphabetical order by female partner's last name.
- The table only shows the period from the first to the last won medal, not all participation at the World Championships.
- If a skater or pair has competed for multiple countries, countries are listed in chronological order (from first to last).

Top 10 ranking of pairs skaters by the most medals won at the World Championships
| No. | Female partner | Male partner | Nation | Period | Gold medal – first place | Silver medal – second place | Bronze medal – third place | Total | Ref. |
|---|---|---|---|---|---|---|---|---|---|
| 1 | Aljona Savchenko | Robin Szolkowy | Germany | 2007–2014 | 5 | 2 | 1 | 8 | |
| 2 | Ludmila Belousova | Oleg Protopopov | Soviet Union | 1962–1969 | 4 | 3 | 1 | 8 | |
| 3 | Ludowika Jakobsson (née Eilers) | Walter Jakobsson | (German Empire) Germany & Finland; Finland | 1910–1923 | 3 | 4 | – | 7 | |
| 4 | Shen Xue | Zhao Hongbo | China | 1999–2007 | 3 | 3 | 1 | 7 | |
| 5 | Irina Rodnina (Note: Irina Rodnina won another four golds with Alexei Ulanov (1969–1972), earning a total of ten medals, all of which were gold.) | Alexander Zaitsev | Soviet Union | 1973–1978 | 6 | – | – | 6 | |
| 6 | Elena Valova | Oleg Vasiliev | Soviet Union | 1983–1988 | 3 | 3 | – | 6 | |
| 7 | Pang Qing | Tong Jian | China | 2004–2015 | 2 | 1 | 3 | 6 | |
| 8 | Andrée Brunet (née Joly) | Pierre Brunet | France | 1925–1932 | 4 | 1 | – | 5 | |
| 8 | Ekaterina Gordeeva | Sergei Grinkov | Soviet Union | 1986–1990 | 4 | 1 | – | 5 | |
| 8 | Emília Rotter | László Szollás | Hungary | 1931–1935 | 4 | 1 | – | 5 | |

Four more skaters won a total of six medals in the pairs event, but with different partners:

- Alexei Ulanov of the Soviet Union won four gold medals while partnered with Irina Rodnina (1969–1972), and two silver medals while partnered with Lyudmila Smirnova (1973–1974).
- Marika Kilius of West Germany won two gold medals, two silver medals, and two bronze medals: one silver medal and one bronze medal while partnered with Franz Ningel (1956–1957); and two gold medals, one silver medal, and one bronze medal while partnered with Hans-Jürgen Bäumler (1959–1964).
- Ludwig Wrede of Austria won two gold medals, two silver medals, and two bronze medals: two gold medals and one bronze medal while partnered with Herma Szabo (1925–1927), and two silver medals and a bronze medal while partnered with Melitta Brunner (1928–1930).
- Lloyd Eisler of Canada won one gold medal, three silver medals, and two bronze medals: one bronze medal while partnered with Katherina Matousek (1985) and one gold medal, three silver medals, and one bronze medal while partnered with Isabelle Brasseur (1990–1994).

== Ice dance ==
Ice dance is the most recent of the four disciplines at the World Figure Skating Championships. It was first contested at the 1952 World Championships in Paris, France.

Lyudmila Pakhomova and Aleksandr Gorshkov of the Soviet Union hold the record for winning the most gold medals in ice dance (with six), and also have the longest winning streak at back-to-back events (with five). Guillaume Cizeron of France has also won six gold medals in ice dance, but with different partners. Three teams are tied for winning the most total medals (with eight each): Natalia Bestemianova and Andrei Bukin, Marina Klimova and Sergei Ponomarenko, and Irina Moiseeva and Andrei Minenkov, all of whom competed for the Soviet Union (although Klimova and Ponomarenko represented the Commonwealth of Independent States (CIS) at their last competition in 1992). Klimova and Ponomarenko have won the most silver medals as well well (with five), while Shae-Lynn Bourne and Victor Kraatz of Canada have won the most bronze medals (with four).

=== Total medal count by nation ===
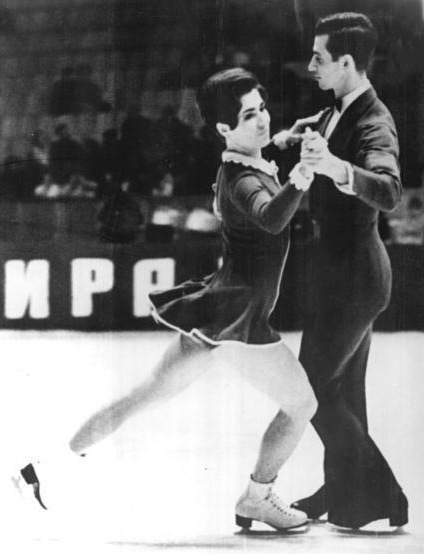
Lyudmila Pakhomova and Aleksandr Gorshkov have won the most gold medals in ice dance at the World Championships (with six total).

- Countries or entities that can no longer participate are indicated in italics with a dagger (†).

Number of World Championship medals in ice dance by nation
| Rank | Nation | Gold | Silver | Bronze | Total |
|---|---|---|---|---|---|
| 1 | Great Britain | 17 | 10 | 8 | 35 |
| 2 | Soviet Union † | 16 | 14 | 8 | 38 |
| 3 | Russia † | 11 | 5 | 4 | 20 |
| 4 | France | 9 | 7 | 5 | 21 |
| 5 | United States | 5 | 14 | 22 | 41 |
| 6 | Canada | 4 | 14 | 15 | 33 |
| 7 | Czechoslovakia † | 4 | 0 | 0 | 4 |
| 8 | Italy | 2 | 2 | 2 | 6 |
| 9 | Bulgaria | 2 | 1 | 1 | 4 |
| 10 | CIS † | 1 | 1 | 1 | 3 |
| 10 | Hungary | 1 | 1 | 1 | 3 |
| 12 | FSR † | 1 | 0 | 0 | 1 |
| 13 | West Germany † | 0 | 3 | 1 | 4 |
| 14 | Finland | 0 | 1 | 1 | 2 |
| 15 | Germany | 0 | 0 | 1 | 1 |
| 15 | Israel | 0 | 0 | 1 | 1 |
| 15 | Lithuania | 0 | 0 | 1 | 1 |
| 15 | Ukraine | 0 | 0 | 1 | 1 |
| Totals (18 entries) | | 73 | 73 | 73 | 219 |

=== Most gold medals by ice dance team ===
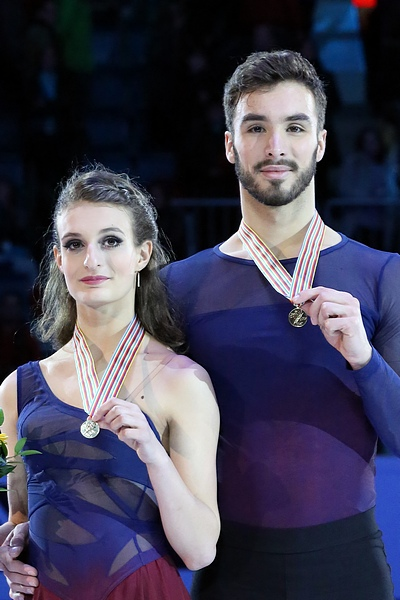
Guillaume Cizeron of France shares the record for the most gold medals won in ice dance (with six), five of which were with Gabriella Papadakis.

- Only teams' results are included in the list. Individual results in the case of partner changes are listed separately below the table.
- If the number of gold medals is identical, the silver and bronze medals are used as tie-breakers (in that order). If all numbers are the same, the teams receive the same placement and are sorted in alphabetical order by the female partner's last name.
- The table only shows the period from the first to the last won medal, not all participation at the World Championships.
- If a skater or team has competed for multiple countries, countries are listed in chronological order (from first to last).

Top 10 ranking of ice dance teams by the most gold medals won at the World Championships
| No. | Female partner | Male partner | Nation | Period | Gold medal – first place | Silver medal – second place | Bronze medal – third place | Total | Ref. |
|---|---|---|---|---|---|---|---|---|---|
| 1 | Lyudmila Pakhomova | Aleksandr Gorshkov | Soviet Union | 1969–1976 | 6 | 1 | – | 7 | |
| 2 | Gabriella Papadakis | Guillaume Cizeron (Note: Guillaume Cizeron won another gold medal with Laurence Fournier Beaudry (2026), earning six gold medals and seven overall medals in total.) | France | 2015–2022 | 5 | 1 | – | 6 | |
| 3 | Natalia Bestemianova | Andrei Bukin | Soviet Union | 1981–1988 | 4 | 3 | 1 | 8 | |
| 4 | Oksana Grishuk | Evgeni Platov | CIS; Russia | 1992–1997 | 4 | 1 | 1 | 6 | |
| 5 | Eva Romanová | Pavel Roman | Czechoslovakia | 1962–1965 | 4 | – | – | 4 | |
| 5 | Jayne Torvill | Christopher Dean | Great Britain | 1981–1984 | 4 | – | – | 4 | |
| 5 | Diane Towler | Bernard Ford | Great Britain | 1966–1969 | 4 | – | – | 4 | |
| 5 | Jean Westwood | Lawrence Demmy | Great Britain | 1952–1955 | 4 | – | – | 4 | |
| 9 | Marina Klimova | Sergei Ponomarenko | Soviet Union; CIS | 1985–1992 | 3 | 5 | – | 8 | |
| 10 | Tessa Virtue | Scott Moir | Canada | 2008–2017 | 3 | 3 | 1 | 7 | |

One skater won four gold medals and one silver medal in the ice dance event, but with two partners:

- Courtney Jones of Great Britain won two gold and one silver medal while partnered with June Markham (1956–1958), and another two gold medals while partnered with Doreen Denny (1959–1960).

=== Most total medals by ice dance team ===
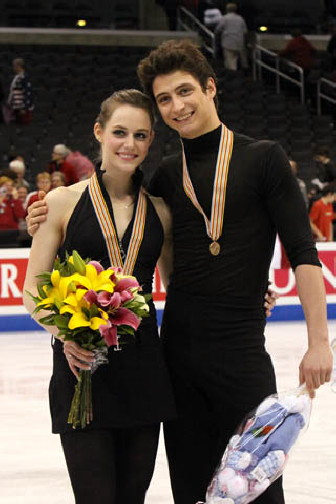
Tessa Virtue and Scott Moir are the only ice dance team of the 21st century to win seven medals at the World Championships.

- Only teams' results are included in the list. Individual results in the case of partner changes are listed separately below the table.
- If the total number of medals is identical, the gold, silver and bronze medals are used as tie-breakers (in that order).
- The table only shows the period from the first to the last won medal, not all participation at the World Championships.
- If a skater or team has competed for multiple countries, countries are listed in chronological order (from first to last).

Top 10 ranking of ice dance teams by the most medals won at the World Championships
| No. | Female partner | Male partner | Nation | Period | Gold medal – first place | Silver medal – second place | Bronze medal – third place | Total | Ref. |
|---|---|---|---|---|---|---|---|---|---|
| 1 | Natalia Bestemianova | Andrei Bukin | Soviet Union | 1981–1988 | 4 | 3 | 1 | 8 | |
| 2 | Marina Klimova | Sergei Ponomarenko | Soviet Union; CIS | 1985–1992 | 3 | 5 | – | 8 | |
| 3 | Irina Moiseeva | Andrei Minenkov | Soviet Union | 1975–1982 | 2 | 3 | 3 | 8 | |
| 4 | Lyudmila Pakhomova | Aleksandr Gorshkov | Soviet Union | 1969–1976 | 6 | 1 | – | 7 | |
| 5 | Tessa Virtue | Scott Moir | Canada | 2008–2017 | 3 | 3 | 1 | 7 | |
| 6 | Gabriella Papadakis | Guillaume Cizeron | France | 2015–2022 | 5 | 1 | – | 6 | |
| 7 | Oksana Grishuk | Evgeni Platov | CIS; Russia | 1992–1997 | 4 | 1 | 1 | 6 | |
| 8 | Madison Chock | Evan Bates | United States | 2015–2025 | 3 | 1 | 2 | 6 | |
| 9 | Shae-Lynn Bourne | Victor Kraatz | Canada | 1996–2003 | 1 | 1 | 4 | 6 | |
| 10 | Natalia Linichuk | Gennadi Karponosov | Soviet Union | 1974–1980 | 2 | 1 | 2 | 5 | |

Three more skaters won a total of five medals in the ice dance event, but with different partners:

- Courtney Jones of Great Britain won four gold medals and one silver medal: two gold medals and one silver medal while partnered with June Markham (1956–1958) and another two gold medals while partnered with Doreen Denny (1959–1960).
- Anjelika Krylova of Russia won two gold medals, two silver medals, and one bronze medal: one bronze medal while partnered with Vladimir Fedorov (1993) and two gold medals and two silver medals while partnered with Oleg Ovsyannikov (1996–1999).
- William McLachlan of Canada won three silver medals and two bronze medals: two silver medals and one bronze medal while partnered with Geraldine Fenton (1957–1959) and one silver medal and one bronze medal while partnered with Virginia Thompson (1960–1962).

== Overall ==
- The table only shows the period of the achievement, not all participations at the World Championships.
- If a skater has competed for multiple countries, countries are listed in chronological order (from first to last).

Medals records across all four disciplines at the World Figure Skating Championships
| Achievement | Record | Skater | Nation | Discipline | Period | Ref. |
|---|---|---|---|---|---|---|
| Most gold medals | 10 | Ulrich Salchow | Sweden | Men's singles | 1901–1911 | |
| Most gold medals | 10 | Sonja Henie | Norway | Women's singles | 1927–1936 | |
| Most gold medals | 10 | Irina Rodnina | Soviet Union | Pairs | 1969–1978 | |
| Most silver medals | 5 | Erik Pausin | Austria (Nazi Germany) Germany | Pairs | 1935–1939 | |
| Most silver medals | 5 | Ilse Pausin | Austria (Nazi Germany) Germany | Pairs | 1935–1939 | |
| Most silver medals | 5 | Lyudmila Smirnova | Soviet Union | Pairs | 1970–1974 | |
| Most silver medals | 5 | Marina Klimova | Soviet Union | Ice dance | 1985–1991 | |
| Most silver medals | 5 | Sergei Ponomarenko | Soviet Union | Ice dance | 1985–1991 | |
| Most bronze medals | 4 | Shae-Lynn Bourne | Canada | Ice dance | 1996–1999 | |
| Most bronze medals | 4 | Victor Kraatz | Canada | Ice dance | 1996–1999 | |
| Most total medals | 13 | Ulrich Salchow | Sweden | Men's singles | 1897–1911 | |
| Most wins at back-to-back events | 10 | Sonja Henie | Norway | Women's singles | 1927–1936 | |
| Most wins at back-to-back events | 10 | Irina Rodnina | Soviet Union | Pairs | 1969–1978 | |

=== Total medal count by nation ===
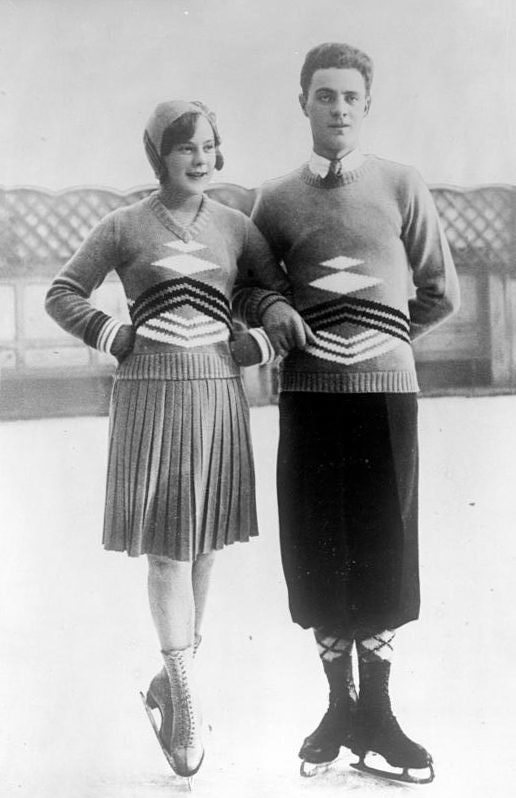
Sonja Henie of Norway and Karl Schäfer of Austria won a total of seventeen gold medals at the World Championships.

- Countries or entities that can no longer participate are indicated in italics with a dagger (†).

Total number of World Championship medals by nation
| Rank | Nation | Gold | Silver | Bronze | Total |
|---|---|---|---|---|---|
| 1 | United States | 64 | 65 | 85 | 214 |
| 2 | Soviet Union † | 44 | 42 | 24 | 110 |
| 3 | Austria | 36 | 46 | 34 | 116 |
| 4 | Canada | 36 | 40 | 39 | 115 |
| 5 | Russia † | 33 | 26 | 27 | 86 |
| 6 | Great Britain | 28 | 30 | 25 | 83 |
| 7 | Japan | 19 | 22 | 16 | 57 |
| 8 | Germany | 17 | 21 | 21 | 59 |
| 9 | France | 17 | 19 | 19 | 55 |
| 10 | Sweden | 15 | 7 | 11 | 33 |
| 11 | Hungary | 13 | 7 | 15 | 35 |
| 12 | East Germany † | 12 | 16 | 12 | 40 |
| 13 | Norway | 10 | 2 | 5 | 17 |
| 14 | Czechoslovakia † | 9 | 5 | 5 | 19 |
| 15 | China | 8 | 11 | 9 | 28 |
| 16 | West Germany † | 6 | 12 | 7 | 25 |
| 17 | Switzerland | 4 | 2 | 2 | 8 |
| 18 | Netherlands | 4 | 1 | 3 | 8 |
| 19 | Finland | 3 | 5 | 3 | 11 |
| 20 | Italy | 3 | 4 | 9 | 16 |
| 21 | FSR † | 3 | 1 | 2 | 6 |
| 22 | CIS † | 3 | 1 | 1 | 5 |
| 23 | South Korea | 2 | 4 | 3 | 9 |
| 24 | Belgium | 2 | 1 | 3 | 6 |
| 25 | Bulgaria | 2 | 1 | 1 | 4 |
| 26 | Spain | 2 | 0 | 2 | 4 |
| 27 | Ukraine | 1 | 0 | 2 | 3 |
| 28 | Czech Republic | 1 | 0 | 0 | 1 |
| 29 | Kazakhstan | 0 | 3 | 1 | 4 |
| 30 | Georgia | 0 | 1 | 0 | 1 |
| 31 | Poland | 0 | 0 | 2 | 2 |
| 32 | Israel | 0 | 0 | 1 | 1 |
| 32 | Lithuania | 0 | 0 | 1 | 1 |
| Totals (33 entries) | | 397 | 395 | 390 | 1,182 |

=== Most gold medals by skater ===
- If the number of gold medals is identical, the silver and bronze medals are used as tie-breakers (in that order). If all numbers are the same, the skaters receive the same placement and are sorted in alphabetical order.
- The table only shows the period from the first to the last won medal, not all participation at the World Championships.

Top 10 ranking of skaters by the most gold medals won at the World Championships
| No. | Skater | Nation | Discipline(s) | Period | Gold medal – first place | Silver medal – second place | Bronze medal – third place | Total | Ref. |
|---|---|---|---|---|---|---|---|---|---|
| 1 | Ulrich Salchow | Sweden | Men's singles | 1897–1911 | 10 | 3 | – | 13 | |
| 2 | Sonja Henie | Norway | Women's singles | 1926–1936 | 10 | 1 | – | 11 | |
| 3 | Irina Rodnina | Soviet Union | Pairs | 1969–1978 | 10 | – | – | 10 | |
| 4 | Karl Schäfer | Austria | Men's singles | 1927–1936 | 7 | 2 | 1 | 10 | |
| 5 | Herma Szabo | Austria | Women's singles | 1922–1927 | 7 | 1 | 1 | 9 | |
| 5 | Herma Szabo | Austria | Pairs | 1922–1927 | 7 | 1 | 1 | 9 | |
| 6 | Aljona Savchenko | Germany | Pairs | 2007–2018 | 6 | 3 | 2 | 11 | |
| 7 | Guillaume Cizeron | France | Ice dance | 2015–2026 | 6 | 1 | – | 7 | |
| 7 | Aleksandr Gorshkov | Soviet Union | Ice dance | 1969–1976 | 6 | 1 | – | 7 | |
| 7 | Lyudmila Pakhomova | Soviet Union | Ice dance | 1969–1976 | 6 | 1 | – | 7 | |
| 10 | Alexander Zaitsev | Soviet Union | Pairs | 1973–1978 | 6 | – | – | 6 | |

=== Most total medals by skater ===
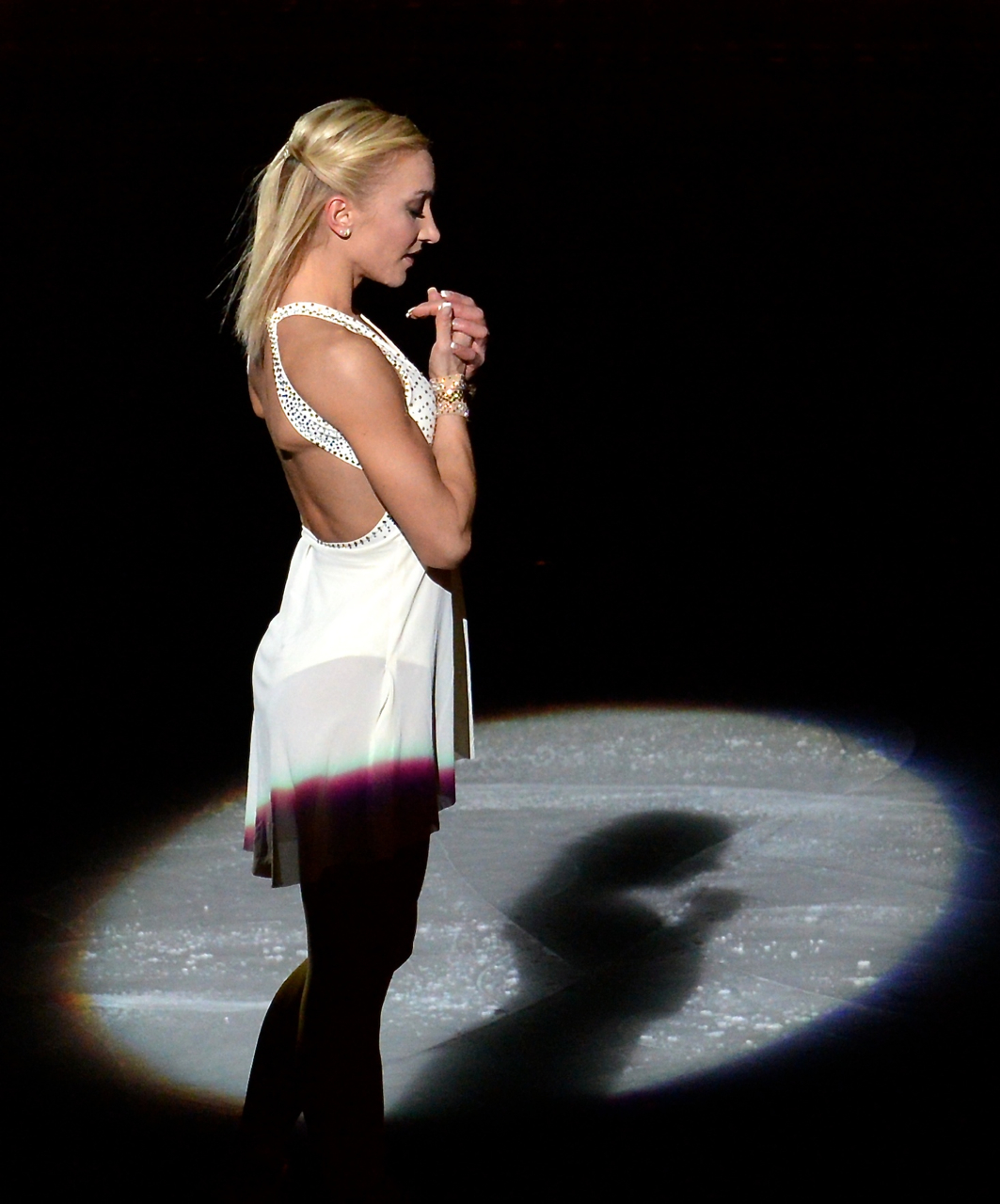
With a total of eleven medals, Aljona Savchenko is the most decorated skater at the World Championships in the post-war era.

- If the total number of medals is identical, the gold, silver and bronze medals are used as tie-breakers (in that order). If all numbers are the same, the skaters receive the same placement and are sorted in alphabetical order.
- The table only shows the period from the first to the last won medal, not all participation at the World Championships.

Top 10 ranking of skaters by the most medals won at the World Championships
| No. | Skater | Nation | Discipline(s) | Period | Gold medal – first place | Silver medal – second place | Bronze medal – third place | Total | Ref. |
|---|---|---|---|---|---|---|---|---|---|
| 1 | Ulrich Salchow | Sweden | Men's singles | 1897–1911 | 10 | 3 | – | 13 | |
| 2 | Sonja Henie | Norway | Women's singles | 1926–1936 | 10 | 1 | – | 11 | |
| 3 | Aljona Savchenko | Germany | Pairs | 2007–2018 | 6 | 3 | 2 | 11 | |
| 4 | Irina Rodnina | Soviet Union | Pairs | 1969–1978 | 10 | – | – | 10 | |
| 5 | Karl Schäfer | Austria | Men's singles | 1927–1936 | 7 | 2 | 1 | 10 | |
| 6 | Herma Szabo | Austria | Women's singles | 1922–1927 | 7 | 1 | 1 | 9 | |
| 6 | Herma Szabo | Austria | Pairs | 1922–1927 | 7 | 1 | 1 | 9 | |
| 7 | Michelle Kwan | United States | Women's singles | 1996–2004 | 5 | 3 | 1 | 9 | |
| 8 | Willy Böckl | Austria | Men's singles | 1913–1928 | 4 | 3 | 2 | 9 | |
| 9 | Ernst Baier | Germany | Pairs | 1931–1939 | 4 | 2 | 3 | 9 | |
| 9 | Ernst Baier | Germany | Men's singles | 1931–1939 | 4 | 2 | 3 | 9 | |
| 10 | Robin Szolkowy | Germany | Pairs | 2007–2014 | 5 | 2 | 1 | 8 | |

== See also ==
- List of Olympic medalists in figure skating
- European Figure Skating Championships cumulative medal count
- Four Continents Figure Skating Championships cumulative medal count

== Works cited ==
- Hines, James R. (2006). Figure Skating: A History. University of Illinois Press. ISBN 978-0-252-07286-4.
