= European Figure Skating Championships cumulative medal count =

Figure skating records and statistics

Medal records
- Olympic Games; World Championships; European Championships; Four Continents Championships; Grand Prix of Figure Skating; Other events
- Grand Slam; Junior Grand Slam; Golden Slam; Junior Golden Slam; Super Slam

Highest scores statistics
- Current senior; Current junior; Historical senior; Historical junior

Rankings (current and statistics)
- World Standings; Season's World Ranking

The European Figure Skating Championships are an annual figure skating competition sanctioned by the International Skating Union (ISU). Launched in 1891, the European Championships are the sport's oldest competition. Only eligible skaters from ISU member countries in Europe are allowed to compete, while skaters from countries outside of Europe instead compete in the Four Continents Figure Skating Championships.

Medals are awarded in men's singles, women's singles, pair skating, and ice dance. Ulrich Salchow of Sweden currently hold the record for winning the most gold medals at the European Championships in men's singles (with nine), while Irina Slutskaya of Russia holds the record in women's singles (with seven). Irina Rodnina and Alexander Zaitsev of the Soviet Union hold the record in pair skating (with seven), although Rodnina won another four gold medals with her previous partner Alexei Ulanov, and thus holds the record for the most gold medals won by an individual skater in pair skating (with eleven). Lyudmila Pakhomova and Aleksandr Gorshkov, also of the Soviet Union, hold the record in ice dance (with six). Guillaume Cizeron of France also won record six gold medals won in ice dance, but with different partners.

== Men's singles ==
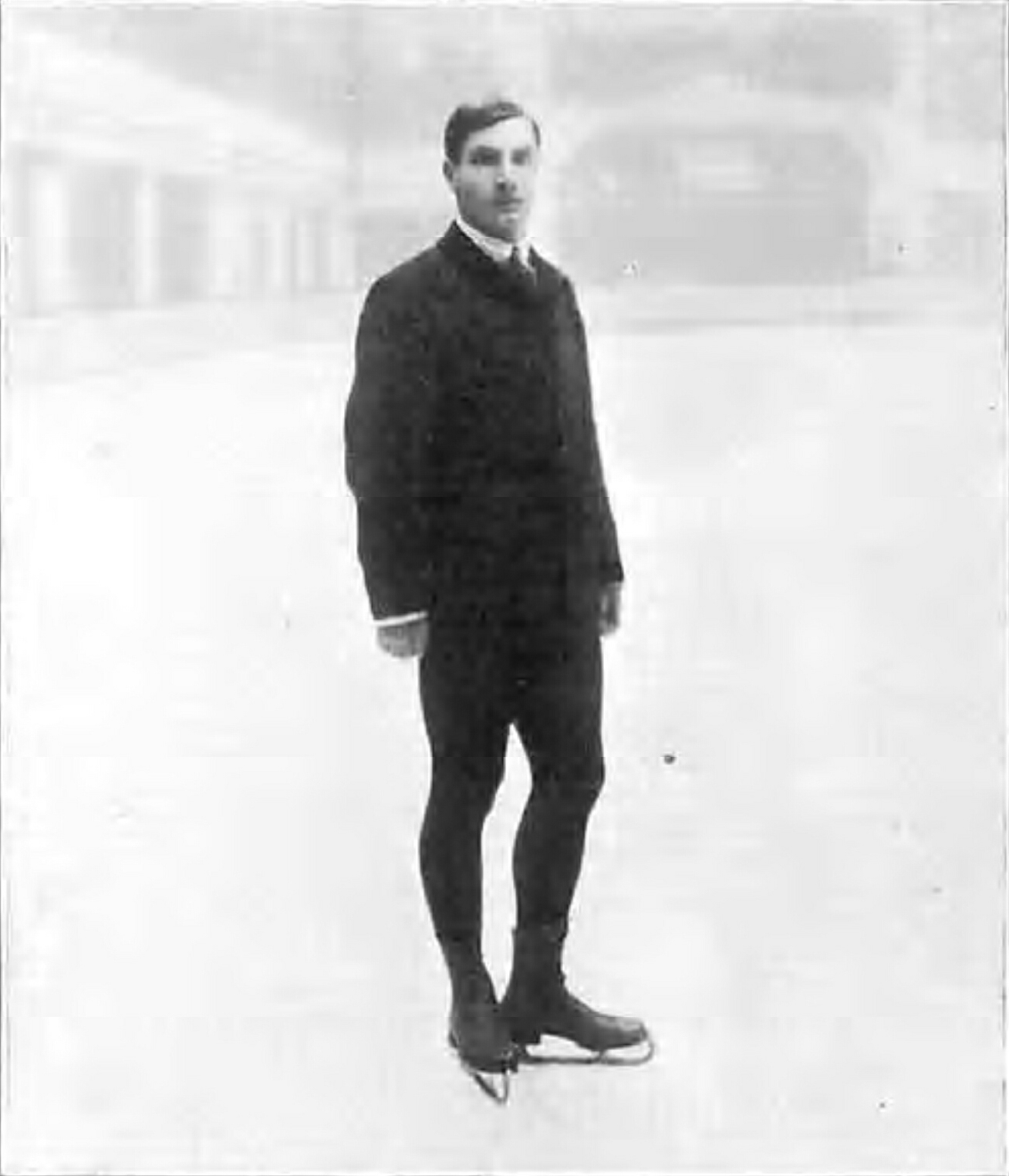
Ulrich Salchow of Sweden won a record nine gold medals and a record ten total medals in men's singles at the European Championships.

The first European Championships were held in 1891 in Hamburg, Germany, and featured one segment, compulsory figures. The event was sponsored by the Austrian and German skating federations after they had combined to become one federation. The 1893 European Championships were the first time the event was held under the jurisdiction of the International Skating Union (ISU), which hed been formed in the summer of 1892.

Ulrich Salchow of Sweden has won the most gold medals in the men's event (with nine). The record for most back-to-back titles is held by Karl Schäfer of Austria, who won eight gold medals from 1929 to 1936. Salchow and Schäfer also share the record for the most total medals won with Brian Joubert of France and Evgeni Plushenko of Russia (with ten medals each). Four skaters also share the record for winning the most silver medals (with four each): Alain Giletti of France, Gustav Hügel of Austria, Vladimir Kotin of the Soviet Union, and Vladimir Kovalyov, also of the Soviet Union. Three skaters share the record for winning the most bronze medals (with four each): Karol Divín of Czechoslovakia, Brian Joubert of France, and Vyacheslav Zahorodnyuk, who completed for the Soviet Union and then Ukraine.

=== Total medal count by nation ===
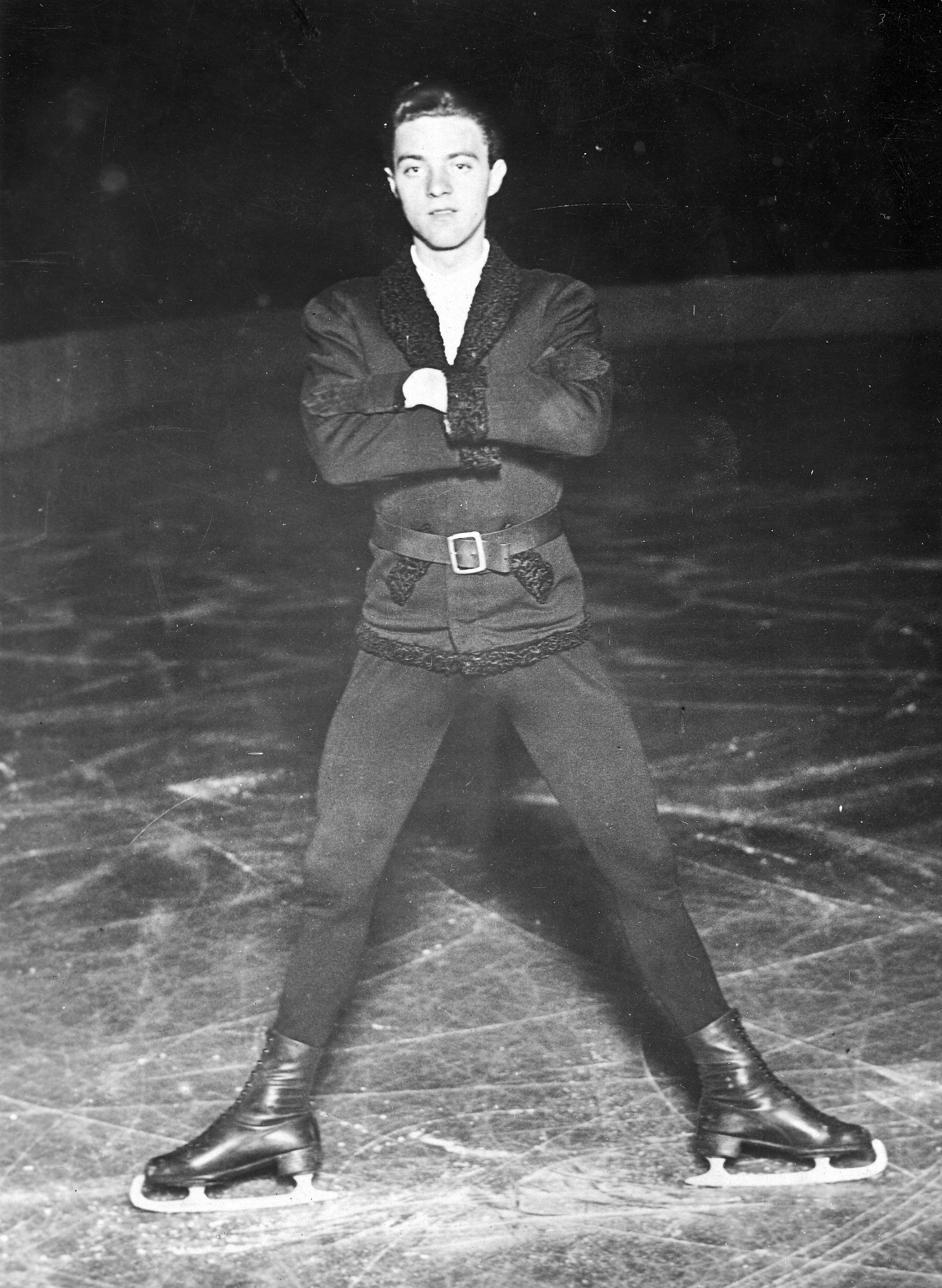
Karl Schäfer of Austria holds the record for the most back-to-back titles at the European Championships (with eight) and shares the record for total medals won (with ten).

- Countries or entities that can no longer participate for whatever reason are indicated in italics with a dagger (†).

Number of European Championship medals in men's singles by nation
Rank	Nation	Gold	Silver	Bronze	Total
1	Austria	31	17	21	69
2	Russia † (Note: Skaters from Russia have been banned from competing at all international skating events since 2022 due to the 2022 Russian invasion of Ukraine.)	14	18	11	43
3	France	14	16	11	41
4	Sweden	11	1	4	16
5	Czechoslovakia †	10	7	8	25
6	Soviet Union †	8	12	10	30
7	Spain	7	0	0	7
8	East Germany †	4	1	3	8
9	Great Britain	3	7	7	17
10	Ukraine	3	1	3	7
11	Italy	2	6	4	12
12	Switzerland	2	5	2	9
13	West Germany †	2	4	6	12
14	Hungary	2	4	3	9
15	Germany	1	10	9	20
16	Czech Republic	1	1	3	5
17	Georgia	1	0	1	2
18	United States † (Note: Prior to 1948, skaters from nations outside of Europe were permitted to compete at the European Championships.)	1	0	0	1
19	Norway	0	3	3	6
20	CIS † (Note: The Commonwealth of Independent States (CIS) was formed following the dissolution of the Soviet Union in 1991.)	0	1	1	2
20	Poland	0	1	1	2
22	Estonia	0	1	0	1
22	Israel	0	1	0	1
24	Belgium	0	0	3	3
25	Finland	0	0	2	2
26	Latvia	0	0	1	1
Totals (26 entries)		117	117	117	351

=== Most gold medals by skater ===
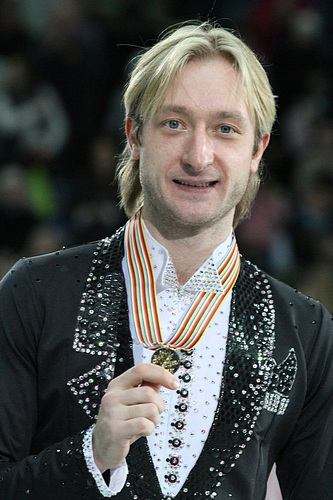
Evgeni Plushenko of Russia shares the record for total medals won in men's singles at the European Championships (with ten).

- If the number of gold medals is identical, the silver and bronze medals are used as tie-breakers (in that order).
- The table only shows the period from the first to last won medal, not all participation at the European Championships.

Top 10 men's singles skaters by the most gold medals won at the European Championships
No.	Skater	Nation	Period	Gold medal – first place	Silver medal – second place	Bronze medal – third place	Total	Ref.
1	Ulrich Salchow	Sweden	1898–1913	9	–	1	10	
2	Karl Schäfer	Austria	1927–1936	8	1	1	10	
3	Evgeni Plushenko	Russia	1998–2012	7	3	–	10	
4	Javier Fernández	Spain	2013–2019	7	–	–	7	
5	Willy Böckl	Austria	1913–1928	6	–	2	8	
6	Alain Giletti	France	1953–1961	5	4	–	9	
7	Ondrej Nepela	Czechoslovakia	1966–1973	5	–	3	8	
8	Jan Hoffmann	East Germany	1973–1980	4	1	2	7	
9	Alexandre Fadeev	Soviet Union	1983–1989	4	–	2	6	
10	Emmerich Danzer	Austria	1963–1968	4	–	1	5	

=== Most medals by skater ===
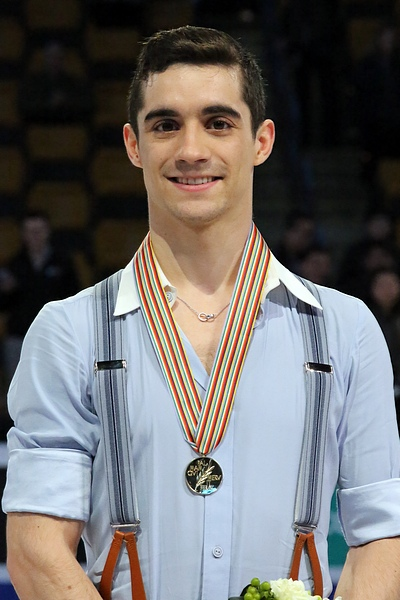
Javier Fernández of Spain won seven gold medals in men's singles at the European Championships.

- If the total number of medals is identical, the gold, silver, and bronze medals are used as tie-breakers (in that order).
- The table only shows the period from the first to last won medal, not all participation at the European Championships.

Top 10 ranking of men's singles skaters by total medals won at the European Championships
No.	Skater	Nation	Period	Gold medal – first place	Silver medal – second place	Bronze medal – third place	Total	Ref.
1	Ulrich Salchow	Sweden	1898–1913	9	–	1	10	
2	Karl Schäfer	Austria	1927–1936	8	1	1	10	
3	Evgeni Plushenko	Russia	1998–2012	7	3	–	10	
4	Brian Joubert	France	2002–2011	3	3	4	10	
5	Alain Giletti	France	1953–1961	5	4	–	9	
6	Willy Böckl	Austria	1913–1928	6	–	2	8	
7	Ondrej Nepela	Czechoslovakia	1966–1973	5	–	3	8	
8	Karol Divín	Czechoslovakia	1954–1964	2	2	4	8	
9	Javier Fernández	Spain	2013–2019	7	–	–	7	
10	Jan Hoffmann	East Germany	1973–1980	4	1	2	7	

== Women's singles ==
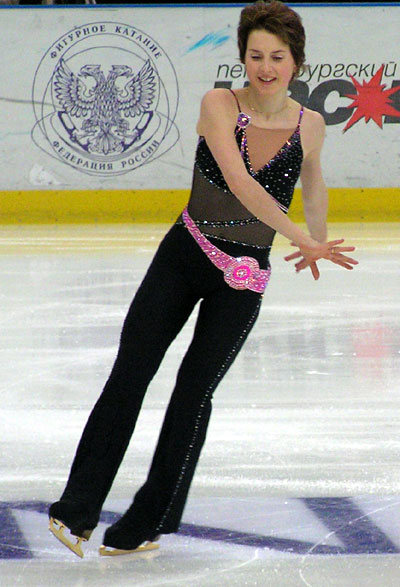
Irina Slutskaya has won a record seven gold medals in women's singles at the European Championships.

The women's event was first held in 1930 in Vienna, Austria. The first combined European Championships for men, women, and pairs took place in 1932 in Paris, France.

Irina Slutskaya of Russia has won the most gold medals in the women's singles (with seven). Sonja Henie of Norway and Katarina Witt of East Germany share the record for most back-to-back titles (with six each). Carolina Kostner of Italy has won the most medals overall (with eleven). Three skaters share the record for winning the most silver medals (with four each): Regine Heitzer of Austria, Kira Ivanova of the Soviet Union, and Dagmar Lurz of West Germany. Three skaters are also tied for winning the most bronze medals (also with four each): Carolina Kostner of Italy, Anna Kondrashova of the Soviet Union, and Viktoria Volchkova of Russia.

=== Total medal count by nation ===
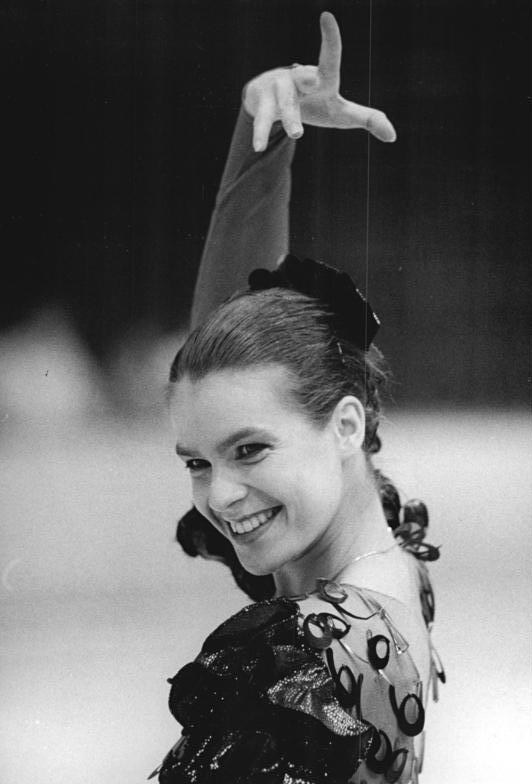
With six gold medals and seven total medals, Katarina Witt of East Germany is one of the most successful European figure skaters in the women's singles event.

- Countries or entities that can no longer participate for whatever reason are indicated in italics with a dagger (†).

Number of European Championship medals in women's singles by nation
Rank	Nation	Gold	Silver	Bronze	Total
1	Russia † (Note: Skaters from Russia have been banned from competing at all international skating events since 2022 due to the 2022 Russian invasion of Ukraine.)	18	17	11	46
2	East Germany †	17	4	3	24
3	Austria	12	13	10	35
4	Great Britain	6	11	11	28
5	Netherlands	6	3	3	12
6	Norway	6	0	0	6
7	France	5	4	4	13
8	Italy	5	3	8	16
9	West Germany †	2	6	4	12
10	Czechoslovakia †	2	3	3	8
11	Switzerland	2	2	3	7
12	Canada † (Note: Prior to 1948, skaters from nations outside of Europe were permitted to compete at the European Championships.)	2	0	0	2
12	Estonia	2	0	0	2
14	Finland	1	3	5	9
15	Belgium	1	2	3	6
15	Hungary	1	2	3	6
17	Georgia	1	2	2	5
18	Soviet Union †	0	7	6	13
19	Ukraine	0	3	3	6
20	Germany	0	2	4	6
21	United States †	0	1	1	2
22	Yugoslavia †	0	1	0	1
23	Sweden	0	0	2	2
Totals (23 entries)		89	89	89	267

=== Most gold medals by skater ===
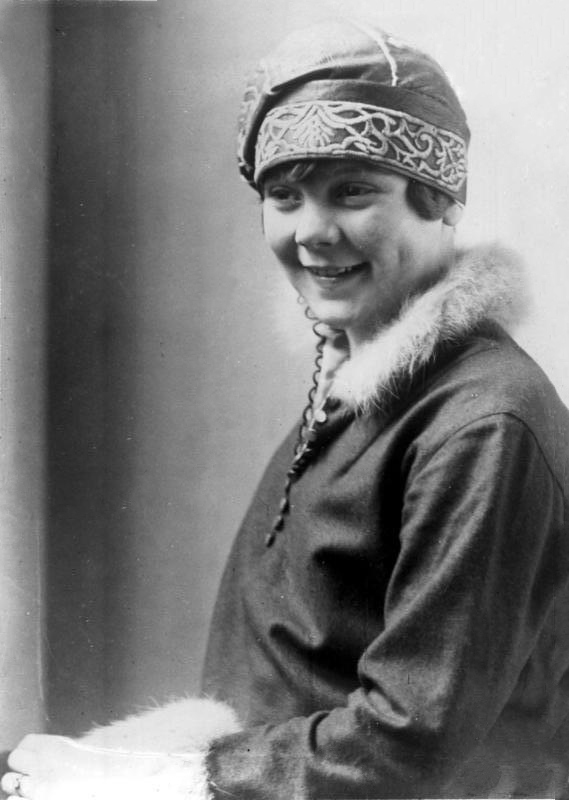
Sonja Henie of Norway shares the record for the most back-to-back titles at the European Championships (six).

- If the total number of medals is identical, the gold, silver, and bronze medals are used as tie-breakers (in that order). If all numbers are the same, the skaters receive the same placement and are sorted in alphabetical order.
- The table only shows the period from the first to last won medal, not all participation at the European Championships.

Top 10 women's singles skaters by the most gold medals won at the European Championships
No.	Skater	Nation	Period	Gold medal – first place	Silver medal – second place	Bronze medal – third place	Total	Ref.
1	Irina Slutskaya	Russia	1996–2006	7	2	–	9	
2	Katarina Witt	East Germany	1982–1988	6	1	–	7	
3	Sonja Henie	Norway	1931–1936	6	–	–	6	
4	Carolina Kostner	Italy	2006–2018	5	2	4	11	
5	Surya Bonaly	France	1991–1996	5	1	–	6	
5	Sjoukje Dijkstra	Netherlands	1959–1964	5	1	–	6	
7	Anett Pötzsch	East Germany	1975–1980	4	1	1	6	
8	Maria Butyrskaya	Russia	1996–2002	3	2	1	6	
8	Cecilia Colledge	Great Britain	1933–1939	3	2	1	6	
10	Gabriele Seyfert	East Germany	1966–1970	3	2	–	5	

=== Most medals by skater ===
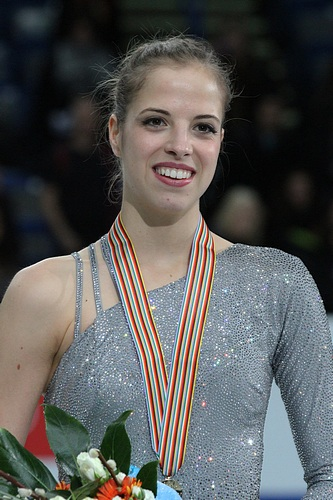
Carolina Kostner of Italy holds the record for total medals won in women's singles at the European Championships (with eleven).

- If the total number of medals is identical, the gold, silver, and bronze medals are used as tie-breakers (in that order). If all numbers are the same, the skaters receive the same placement and are sorted in alphabetical order.
- The table only shows the period from the first to last won medal, not all participation at the European Championships.

Top 10 women's singles skaters by total medals won at the European Championships
No.	Skater	Nation	Period	Gold medal – first place	Silver medal – second place	Bronze medal – third place	Total	Ref.
1	Carolina Kostner	Italy	2006–2018	5	2	4	11	
2	Irina Slutskaya	Russia	1996–2006	7	2	–	9	
3	Katarina Witt	East Germany	1982–1988	6	1	–	7	
4	Regine Heitzer	Austria	1960–1966	2	4	1	7	
5	Sonja Henie	Norway	1931–1936	6	–	–	6	
6	Surya Bonaly	France	1991–1996	5	1	–	6	
6	Sjoukje Dijkstra	Netherlands	1959–1964	5	1	–	6	
8	Anett Pötzsch	East Germany	1975–1980	4	1	1	6	
9	Maria Butyrskaya	Russia	1996–2002	3	2	1	6	
9	Cecilia Colledge	Great Britain	1933–1939	3	2	1	6	

== Pairs ==
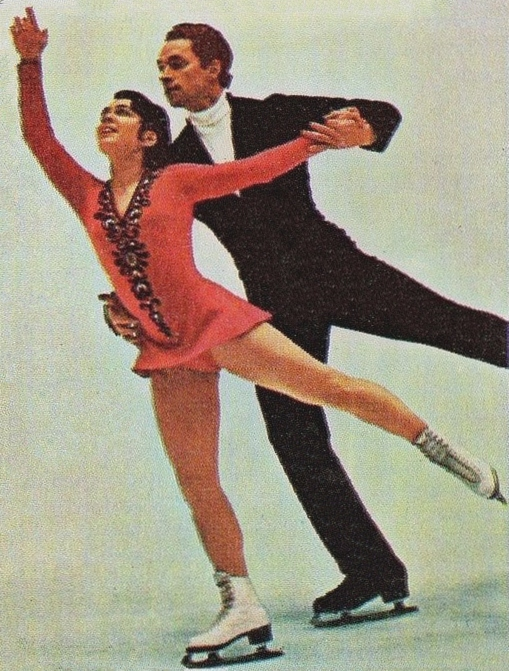
Irina Rodnina (left) of the Soviet Union won a record eleven gold medals in pair skating at the European Championships: four with Alexei Ulanov (right) and another seven with Alexander Zaitsev.

The first pair skating event was held in 1930 in Vienna, Austria. The first combined European Championships for men, women, and pairs took place in 1932 in Paris, France.

Irina Rodnina and Alexander Zaitsev of the Soviet Union hold the record for winning the most gold medals (with seven in a row). Due to missing at the 1979 European Championships, Rodnina and Zaitsev share the record for the longest winning streak of back-to-back events with Marika Kilius and Hans-Jürgen Bäumler of West Germany (with six each). Rodnina won another four gold medals with her previous partner Alexei Ulanov and was undefeated at eleven European Championships in a row. The record for total medals won is shared by two pairs (with eight each): Ludmila Belousova and Oleg Protopopov of the Soviet Union, and Maria Petrova and Alexei Tikhonov of Russia, while Rodnina holds the record for the most total medals won by a skater in pairs (eleven). Belousova and Protopopov also share the record for winning the most silver medals with Marianna and László Nagy of Hungary (with four each), while Aljona Savchenko of Germany won five silver medals, but with different partners. The record for winning the most bronze medals is held by Sarah Abitbol and Stéphane Bernadis of France (with five). Franz Ningel of West Germany also won five bronze medals, but with different partners.

=== Total medal count by nation ===
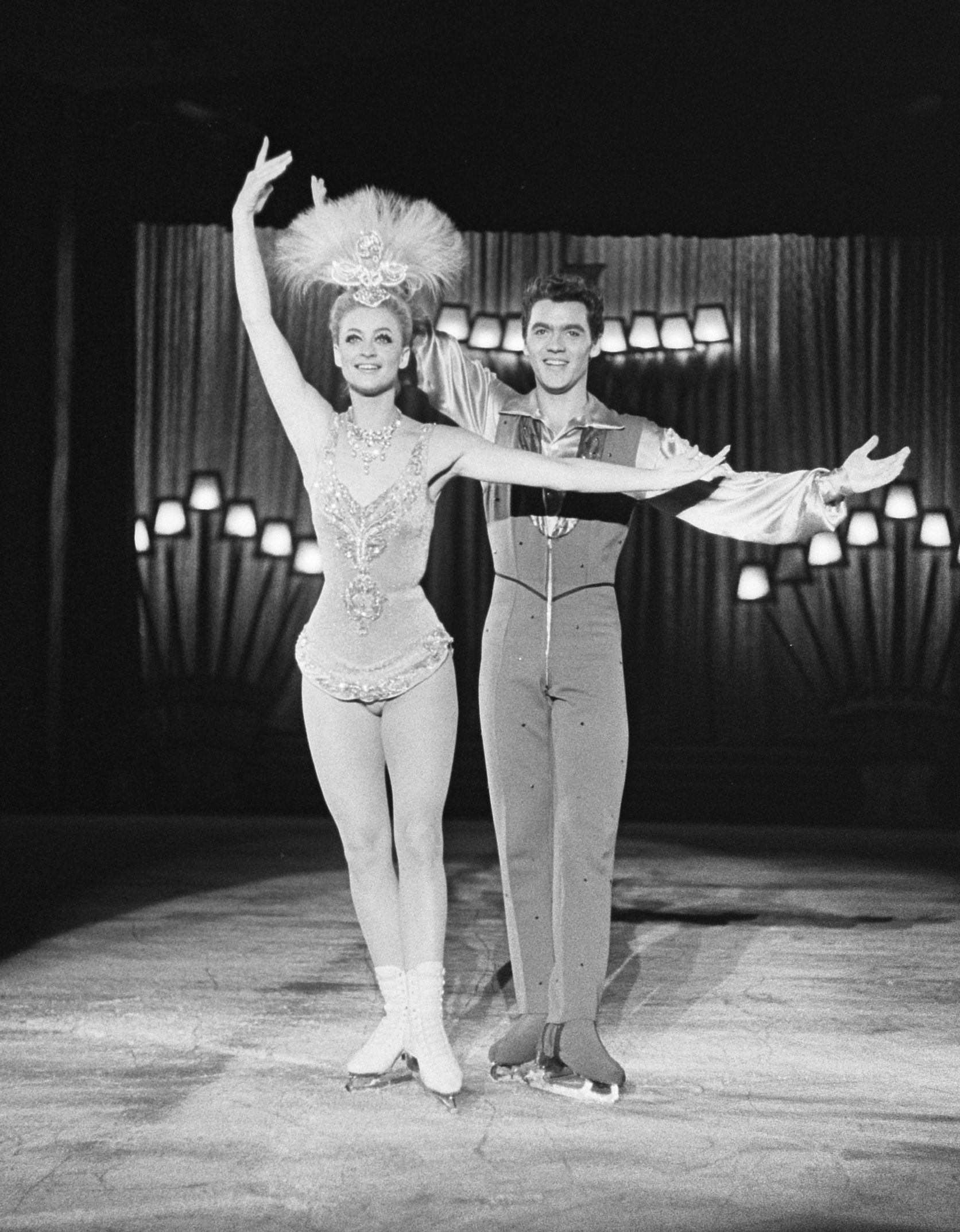
Marika Kilius and Hans-Jürgen Bäumler of West Germany won six titles in pair skating at the European Championships.

- Countries or entities that can no longer participate for whatever reason are indicated in italics with a dagger (†).

Number of European Championship medals in pair skating by nation
Rank	Nation	Gold	Silver	Bronze	Total
1	Soviet Union †	25	25	16	66
2	Russia † (Note: Skaters from Russia have been banned from competing at all international skating events since 2022 due to the 2022 Russian invasion of Ukraine.)	23	16	20	59
3	Germany	11	10	3	24
4	West Germany †	8	3	7	18
5	Hungary	7	6	5	18
6	Austria	2	7	6	15
7	East Germany †	2	5	12	19
8	France	2	2	6	10
9	Italy	2	2	2	6
10	Czechoslovakia †	2	2	1	5
11	Great Britain	1	3	5	9
12	Switzerland	1	3	0	4
13	CIS † (Note: The Commonwealth of Independent States (CIS) was formed following the dissolution of the Soviet Union in 1991.)	1	1	1	3
13	Georgia	1	1	1	3
15	Belgium	1	0	1	2
16	Poland	0	2	3	5
17	Czech Republic	0	1	0	1
Totals (17 entries)		89	89	89	267

=== Most gold medals by pairs team ===
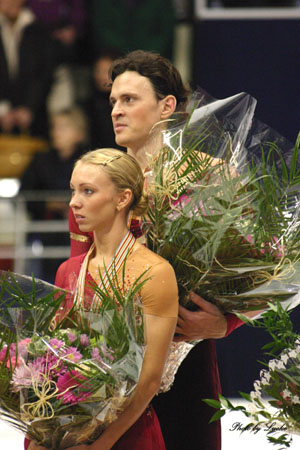
Tatiana Totmianina and Maxim Marinin of Russia won five titles in pair skating at the European Championships.

- Only pair results are included in the list. Individual results in case of partner changes are marked with a note or listed separately below the table.
- If the number of gold medals is identical, the silver and bronze medals are used as tie-breakers (in that order). If all numbers are the same, the pairs receive the same placement and are sorted in alphabetical order by the female partner's last name.
- The table only shows the period from the first to last won medal, not all participation at the European Championships.
- If a skater or team has competed for multiple countries, countries are listed in chronological order (from first to last).

Top 10 pairs teams by the most gold medals won at the European Championships
No.	Female partner	Male partner	Nation	Period	Gold medal – first place	Silver medal – second place	Bronze medal – third place	Total	Ref.
1	Irina Rodnina	Alexander Zaitsev	Soviet Union	1973–1980	7	–	–	7	
2	Marika Kilius (Note: Marika Kilius won another three bronze medals with Franz Ningel (1955–1957), earning nine European medals in total.)	Hans-Jürgen Bäumler	West Germany	1959–1964	6	–	–	6	
3	Tatiana Totmianina	Maxim Marinin	Russia	2001–2006	5	1	–	6	
4	Maxi Herber	Ernst Baier	Germany	1935–1939	5	–	–	5	
5	Ludmila Belousova	Oleg Protopopov	Soviet Union	1962–1969	4	4	–	8	
6	Aljona Savchenko (Note: Aljona Savchenko won another two silver medals with Bruno Massot (2016–2017), earning nine European medals in total.)	Robin Szolkowy	Germany	2006–2013	4	3	–	7	
7	Irina Rodnina	Alexei Ulanov (Note: Alexei Ulanov won another one silver and one bronze medal with Lyudmila Smirnova (1973–1974), earning six European medals in total.)	Soviet Union	1969–1972	4	–	–	4	
7	Tatiana Volosozhar	Maxim Trankov (Note: Maxim Trankov won another one silver and two bronze medals with Maria Mukhortova (2008–2010), earning seven European medals in total.)	Russia	2012–2016	4	–	–	4	
9	Elena Valova	Oleg Vasiliev	Soviet Union	1983–1987	3	2	–	5	
10	Ekaterina Gordeeva	Sergei Grinkov	Soviet Union; Russia	1986–1994	3	1	–	4	

Notes

One skater won three gold medals, one silver medal and three bronze medals in the pairs event, but with different partners:

- Artur Dmitriev won two gold medals and three silver medals while partnered with Natalia Mishkutionok (1989–1994) and representing the Soviet Union, the Commonwealth of Independent States (CIS) and Russia; and one gold medal and one silver medal while partnered with Oksana Kazakova (1996–1998) and representing Russia.

=== Most medals by pairs team ===
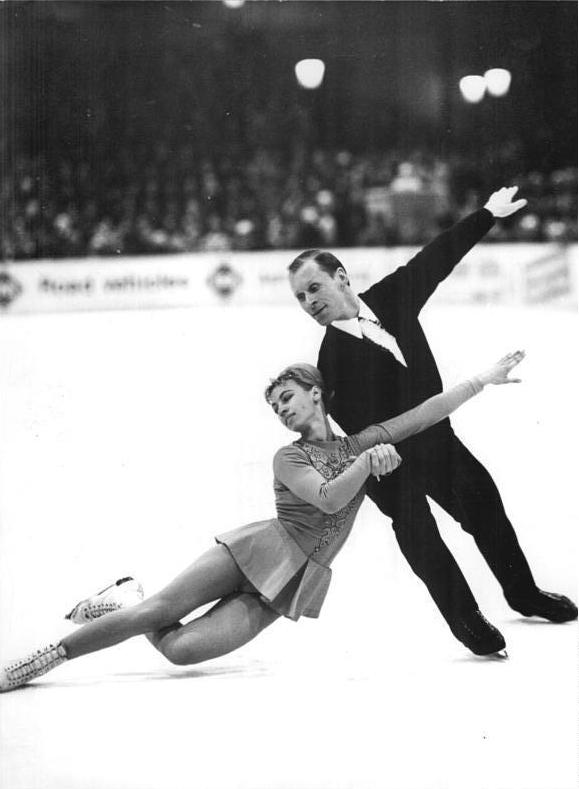
Ludmilla Belousova and Oleg Protopopov of the Soviet Union won record eight medals as the pair at the European Championships.

- Only pair results are included in the list. Individual results in case of partner changes are marked with a note or listed separately below the table.
- If the total number of medals is identical, the gold, silver and bronze medals are used as tie-breakers (in that order).
- The table only shows the period from the first to last won medal, not all participation at the European Championships.

Top 10 ranking of pairs skaters by total medals won at the European Championships
No.	Female partner	Male partner	Nation	Period	Gold medal – first place	Silver medal – second place	Bronze medal – third place	Total	Ref.
1	Ludmila Belousova	Oleg Protopopov	Soviet Union	1962–1969	4	4	–	8	
2	Maria Petrova	Alexei Tikhonov	Russia	1999–2007	2	2	4	8	
3	Irina Rodnina (Note: Irina Rodnina won another four golds with Alexei Ulanov (1969–1972), earning a total of eleven medals, all of which were gold.)	Alexander Zaitsev	Soviet Union	1973–1980	7	–	–	7	
4	Aljona Savchenko (Note: Aljona Savchenko won another two silver medals with Bruno Massot (2016–2017), earning nine European medals in total.)	Robin Szolkowy	Germany	2006–2013	4	3	–	7	
5	Marianna Nagy	László Nagy	Hungary	1949–1957	2	4	1	7	
6	Evgenia Tarasova	Vladimir Morozov	Russia	2015–2022	2	3	2	7	
7	Sarah Abitbol	Stéphane Bernadis	France	1996–2003	–	2	5	7	
8	Marika Kilius (Note: Marika Kilius won another three bronze medals with Franz Ningel (1955–1957), earning nine European medals in total.)	Hans-Jürgen Bäumler	West Germany	1959–1964	6	–	–	6	
9	Tatiana Totmianina	Maxim Marinin	Russia	2001–2006	5	1	–	6	
10	Maxi Herber	Ernst Baier	Germany	1935–1939	5	–	–	5	

Notes

Four more skaters won a total of more than five medals in the pairs event, but with different partners:

- Artur Dmitriev won three gold medals, one silver medal, and three bronze medals: two gold medals and three silver medals partnered with Natalia Mishkutionok (1989–1994) while representing the Soviet Union, the Commonwealth of Independent States (CIS) and Russia; and one gold medal and one silver medal partnered with Oksana Kazakova (1996–1998) while representing Russia.
- Maxim Trankov from Russia won four gold medals partnered with Tatiana Volosozhar (2012–2016) and one silver medal and two bronze medals partnered with Maria Mukhortova (2008–2010).
- Alexei Ulanov from the Soviet Union won four gold medals partnered with Irina Rodnina (1969–1972) and one silver medal and a bronze medal partnered with Lyudmila Smirnova (1973–1974).
- Franz Ningel from West Germany won one silver medal and five bronze medals: three bronze medals partnered with Marika Kilius (1955–1957) and one silver medal and two bronze medals partnered with Margret Göbl (1960–1962).

== Ice dance ==
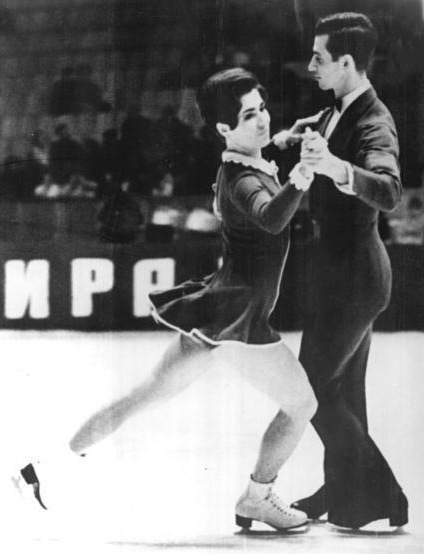
Lyudmila Pakhomova and Aleksandr Gorshkov of the Soviet Union won a record six gold medals and a record eight total medals in ice dance at the European Championships.

Ice dance is the most recent of the four disciplines at the European Figure Skating Championships. It was first held in 1954 in Bolzano, Italy.

Lyudmila Pakhomova and Aleksandr Gorshkov of the Soviet Union hold the record for winning the most gold medals in ice dance (with six). Guillaume Cizeron of France has also won six gold medals in ice dance, but with different partners. Gabriella Papadakis and Guillaume Cizeron of France hold the record for the longest winning streak in ice dance at back-to-back events (with five). Courtney Jones of Great Britain won five European Championships in a row as well, but with different partners. Three teams are tied for winning the most total medals in ice dance (with eight each): Marina Klimova and Sergei Ponomarenko, Natalia Linichuk and Gennadi Karponosov, and Lyudmila Pakhomova and Aleksandr Gorshkov, all of whom competed for the Soviet Union (although Klimova and Ponomarenko represented the Commonwealth of Independent States (CIS) at their last competition in 1992). Klimova and Ponomarenko also share the record for winning the most silver medals in ice dance with six other teams (with three each): Ekaterina Bobrova and Dmitri Soloviev of Russia; Angelika and Erich Buck of West Germany; Anna Cappellini and Luca Lanotte of Italy; Anjelika Krylova and Oleg Ovsyannikov of Russia; Irina Moiseeva and Andrei Minenkov of the Soviet Union; and Maya Usova and Alexander Zhulin, who represented the Soviet Union, the Commonwealth of Independent States (CIS) and Russia. Janet Sawbridge and Yvonne Suddick of Great Britain each also won three silver medals, but with different partners. Natalia Linichuk and Gennadi Karponosov of the Soviet Union have won the most bronze medals in ice dance (with five).

=== Total medal count by nation ===
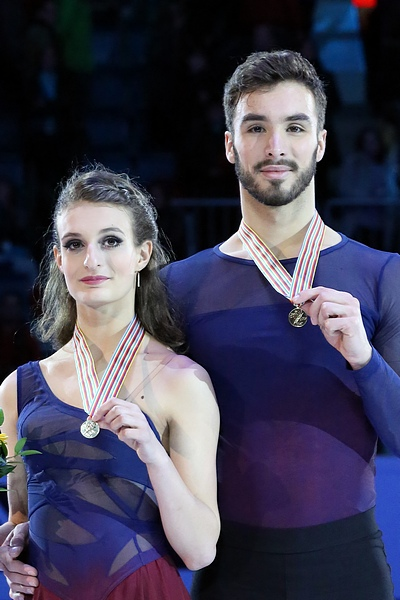
Guillaume Cizeron of France shares the record for the most gold medals won in ice dance (with six), five of which were with Gabriella Papadakis.

- Countries or entities that can no longer participate for whatever reason are indicated in italics with a dagger (†).

Number of European Championship medals in ice dance by nation
Rank	Nation	Gold	Silver	Bronze	Total
1	Soviet Union †	18	14	14	46
2	Great Britain	17	17	20	54
3	Russia † (Note: Skaters from Russia have been banned from competing at all international skating events since 2022 due to the 2022 Russian invasion of Ukraine.)	15	13	14	42
4	France	12	9	7	28
5	Italy	5	8	3	16
6	Czechoslovakia †	2	1	2	5
7	West Germany †	1	3	1	5
8	CIS † (Note: The Commonwealth of Independent States (CIS) was formed following the dissolution of the Soviet Union in 1991.)	1	1	1	3
9	Finland	1	0	2	3
10	Hungary	0	2	2	4
10	Ukraine	0	2	2	4
12	Bulgaria	0	2	1	3
13	Lithuania	0	0	3	3
Totals (13 entries)		72	72	72	216

=== Most gold medals by ice dance team ===
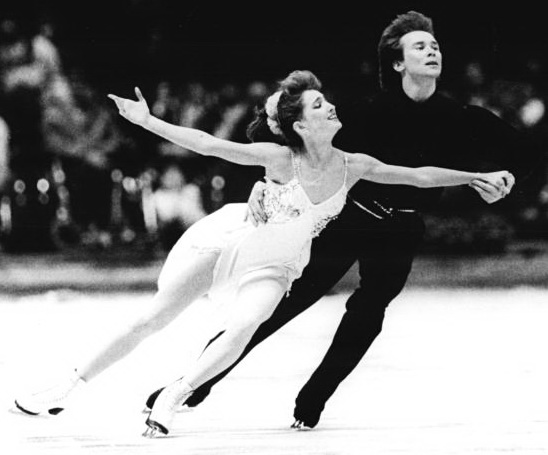
Marina Klimova and Sergei Ponomarenko of the Soviet Union shares the record for total medals won in ice dance at the European Championships (with eight).

- Only teams' results are included in the list. Individual results in the case of partner changes are listed separately below the table.
- If the number of gold medals is identical, the silver and bronze medals are used as tie-breakers (in that order). If all numbers are the same, the teams receive the same placement and are sorted in alphabetical order by the female partner's last name.
- The table only shows the period from the first to last won medal, not all participation at the European Championships.
- If a skater or team has competed for multiple countries, countries are listed in chronological order (from first to last).

Top 10 ranking of ice dance teams by gold medals won at the European Championships
No.	Female partner	Male partner	Nation	Period	Gold medal – first place	Silver medal – second place	Bronze medal – third place	Total	Ref.
1	Lyudmila Pakhomova	Aleksandr Gorshkov	Soviet Union	1969–1976	6	1	1	8	
2	Natalia Bestemianova	Andrei Bukin	Soviet Union	1982–1988	5	2	–	7	
3	Gabriella Papadakis	Guillaume Cizeron (Note: Guillaume Cizeron won another gold medal with Laurence Fournier Beaudry (2026), earning six gold medals and seven European medals in total.)	France	2015–2020	5	1	–	6	
4	Marina Klimova	Sergei Ponomarenko	Soviet Union; CIS	1984–1992	4	3	1	8	
5	Jayne Torvill	Christopher Dean	Great Britain	1981–1994	4	–	–	4	
5	Diane Towler	Bernard Ford	Great Britain	1966–1969	4	–	–	4	
7	Oksana Grishuk	Evgeni Platov	CIS; Russia	1992–1998	3	2	1	6	
8	Charlène Guignard	Marco Fabbri	Italy	2019–2026	3	1	2	6	
9	Tatiana Navka	Roman Kostomarov	Russia	2003–2006	3	–	1	4	
10	Doreen Denny	Courtney Jones (Note: Courtney Jones won another two gold medals and one bronze medal with June Markham (1956–1958), earning five gold medals and six European medals in total.)	Great Britain	1959–1961	3	–	–	3	

=== Most medals by ice dance team ===
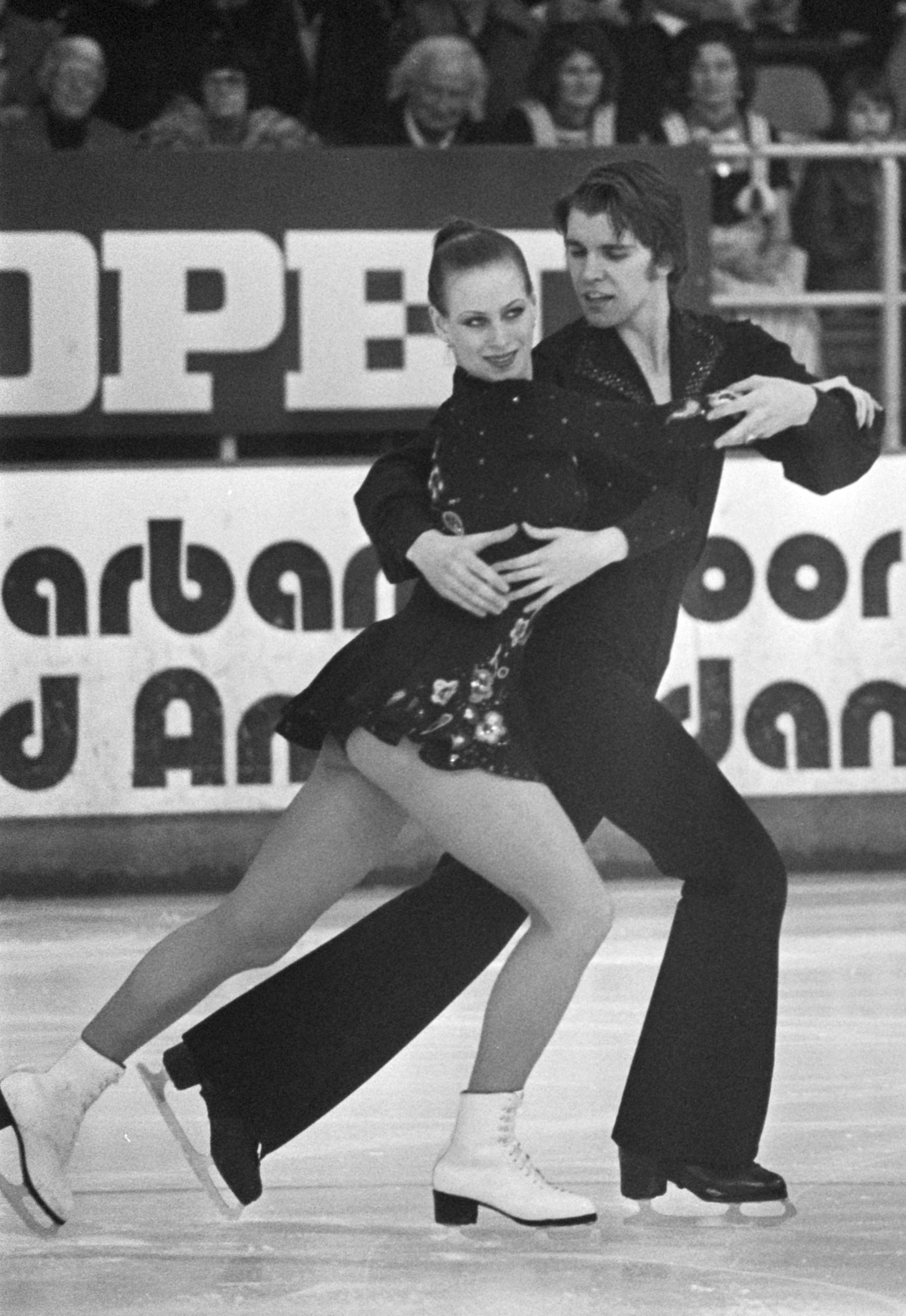
Andrei Minenkov and Irina Moiseeva of the Soviet Union won a seven total medals in ice dance at the European Championships.

- Only teams' results are included in the list. Individual results in the case of partner changes are listed separately below the table.
- If the total number of medals is identical, the gold, silver and bronze medals are used as tie-breakers (in that order). If all numbers are the same, the team receive the same placement and are sorted in alphabetical order by the female partner's last name.
- The table only shows the period from the first to last won medal, not all participation at the European Championships.
- If a skater or team has competed for multiple countries, countries are listed in chronological order (from first to last).

Top 10 ranking of ice dance teams by total medals won at the European Championships
No.	Female partner	Male partner	Nation	Period	Gold medal – first place	Silver medal – second place	Bronze medal – third place	Total	Ref.
1	Lyudmila Pakhomova	Aleksandr Gorshkov	Soviet Union	1969–1976	6	1	1	8	
2	Marina Klimova	Sergei Ponomarenko	Soviet Union; CIS	1984–1992	4	3	1	8	
3	Natalia Linichuk	Gennadi Karponosov	Soviet Union	1974–1981	2	1	5	8	
4	Natalia Bestemianova	Andrei Bukin	Soviet Union	1982–1988	5	2	–	7	
5	Irina Moiseeva	Andrei Minenkov	Soviet Union	1976–1982	2	3	2	7	
6	Gabriella Papadakis	Guillaume Cizeron (Note: Guillaume Cizeron won another gold medal with Laurence Fournier Beaudry (2026), earning six gold medals and seven European medals in total.)	France	2015–2020	5	1	–	6	
7	Oksana Grishuk	Evgeni Platov	CIS; Russia	1992–1998	3	2	1	6	
8	Charlène Guignard	Marco Fabbri	Italy	2019–2026	3	1	2	6	
9	Ekaterina Bobrova	Dmitri Soloviev	Russia	2011–2018	1	3	2	6	
9	Maya Usova	Alexander Zhulin	Soviet Union; CIS; Russia	1989–1994	1	3	2	6	

Note

Two more skaters won a total of six medals in the ice dance event, but with different partners:

- Courtney Jones from Great Britain won five gold medals and one silver medal: two gold medals and one silver medal while partnered with June Markham (1956–1958) and three gold medals while partnered with Doreen Denny (1959–1961).
- Janet Sawbridge from Great Britain won three silver medals and three bronze medals: two silver medals and one bronze medal while partnered with David Hickinbottom (1963–1965), one silver medal and one bronze medal while partnered with Jon Lane (1968–1969), and one bronze medal while partnered with Peter Dalby (1972).

== Overall ==
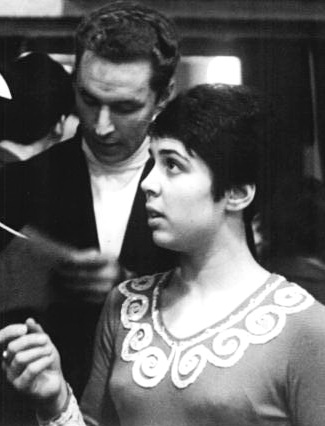
Irina Rodnina is the most decorated figure skater at the European Championships with eleven gold medals.

- The table only shows the period of the achievement, not all participation at the European Championships.

Medal records across all four disciplines at the European Championships
Achievement	Record	Skater	Nation	Discipline	Period	Ref.
Most gold medals	11	Irina Rodnina	Soviet Union	Pairs	1969–1980	
Most silver medals	5	Aljona Savchenko	Germany	Pairs	2006–2017	
Most bronze medals	5	Franz Ningel	West Germany	Pairs	1955–1962	
Most bronze medals	5	Gennadi Karponosov	Soviet Union	Ice dance	1974–1981	
Most bronze medals	5	Natalia Linichuk	Soviet Union	Ice dance	1974–1981	
Most bronze medals	5	Sarah Abitbol	France	Pairs	1996–2001	
Most bronze medals	5	Stéphane Bernadis	France	Pairs	1996–2001	
Most total medals	11	Irina Rodnina	Soviet Union	Pairs	1969–1980	
Most total medals	11	Carolina Kostner	Italy	Women's singles	2006–2018	
Most wins at back-to-back events	10	Irina Rodnina	Soviet Union	Pairs	1969–1978	

=== Total medal count by nation ===
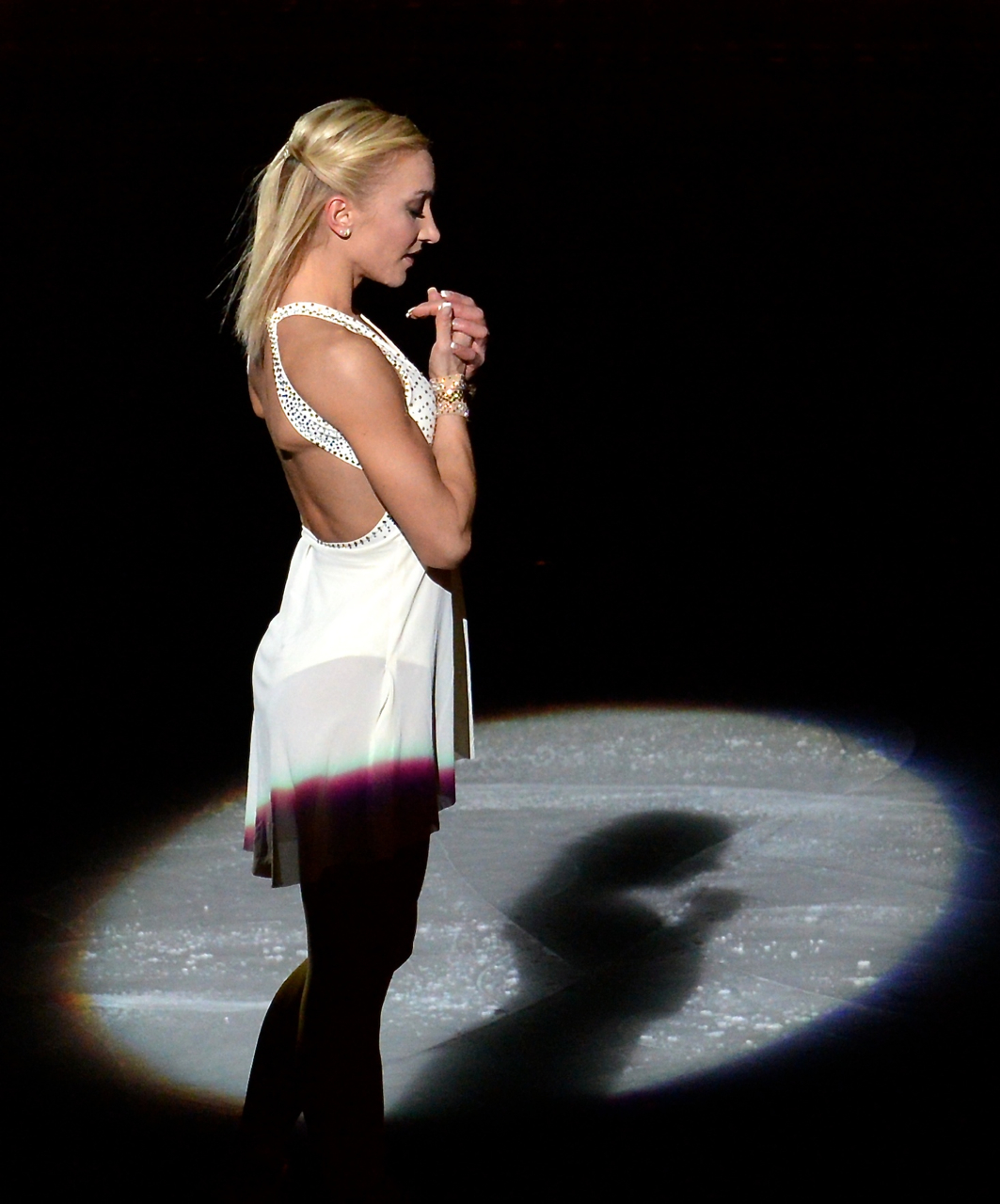
Aljona Savchenko of Germany won the most silver medals in pair skating at the European Championships (with five).

- Countries or entities that can no longer participate for whatever reason are indicated in italics with a dagger (†).

Total number of European Championship medals by nation
Rank	Nation	Gold	Silver	Bronze	Total
1	Russia † (Note: Skaters from Russia have been banned from competing at all international skating events since 2022 due to the 2022 Russian invasion of Ukraine.)	70	64	56	190
2	Soviet Union †	51	58	46	155
3	Austria	45	37	37	119
4	France	33	31	28	92
5	Great Britain	27	38	43	108
6	East Germany †	23	10	18	51
7	Czechoslovakia †	16	13	14	43
8	Italy	14	19	17	50
9	West Germany †	13	16	18	47
10	Germany	12	22	16	50
11	Sweden	11	1	6	18
12	Hungary	10	14	13	37
13	Spain	7	0	0	7
14	Netherlands	6	3	3	12
14	Norway	6	3	3	12
16	Switzerland	5	10	5	20
17	Ukraine	3	6	8	17
18	Georgia	3	3	4	10
19	Finland	2	3	9	14
20	CIS † (Note: The Commonwealth of Independent States (CIS) was formed following the dissolution of the Soviet Union in 1991.)	2	3	3	8
21	Belgium	2	2	7	11
22	Estonia	2	1	0	3
23	Canada † (Note: Prior to 1948, skaters from nations outside of Europe were permitted to compete at the European Championships.)	2	0	0	2
24	Czech Republic	1	2	3	6
25	United States †	1	1	1	3
26	Poland	0	3	4	7
27	Bulgaria	0	2	1	3
28	Israel	0	1	0	1
28	Yugoslavia †	0	1	0	1
30	Lithuania	0	0	3	3
31	Latvia	0	0	1	1
Totals (31 entries)		367	367	367	1,101

=== Most gold medals by skater ===
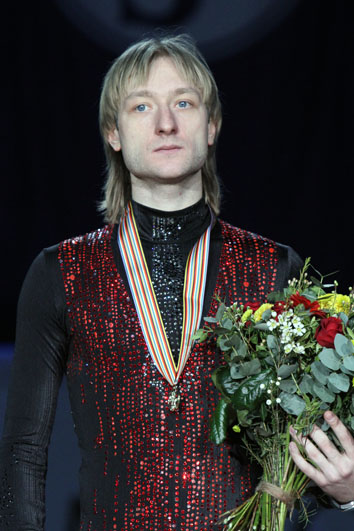
Evgeni Plushenko of Russia won a total of ten medals at the European Championships.

- If the number of gold medals is identical, the silver and bronze medals are used as tie-breakers (in that order). If all numbers are the same, the skaters receive the same placement and are sorted in alphabetical order.
- The table only shows the period from the first to last won medal, not all participation at the European Championships.

Top 10 skaters by the most gold medals won at the European Championships
No.	Skater	Nation	Discipline	Period	Gold medal – first place	Silver medal – second place	Bronze medal – third place	Total	Ref.
1	Irina Rodnina	Soviet Union	Pairs	1969–1980	11	–	–	11	
2	Ulrich Salchow	Sweden	Men's singles	1898–1913	9	–	1	10	
3	Karl Schäfer	Austria	Men's singles	1927–1936	8	1	1	10	
4	Evgeni Plushenko	Russia	Men's singles	1998–2012	7	3	–	10	
5	Irina Slutskaya	Russia	Women's singles	1996–2006	7	2	–	9	
6	Javier Fernández	Spain	Men's singles	2013–2019	7	–	–	7	
6	Alexander Zaitsev	Soviet Union	Pairs	1973–1980	7	–	–	7	
8	Aleksandr Gorshkov	Soviet Union	Ice dance	1969–1976	6	1	1	8	
8	Lyudmila Pakhomova	Soviet Union	Ice dance	1969–1976	6	1	1	8	
10	Guillaume Cizeron	France	Ice dance	2015–2026	6	1	–	7	
10	Katarina Witt	East Germany	Women's singles	1982–1988	6	1	–	7	

=== Most medals by skater ===
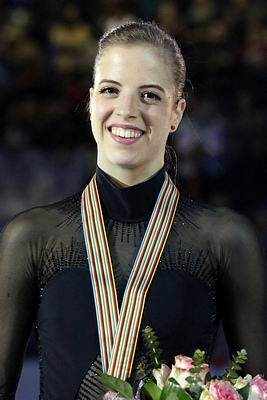
Carolina Kostner of Italy shares the record for total medals won at the European Championships (with eleven).

- If the total number of medals is identical, the gold, silver, and bronze medals are used as tie-breakers (in that order).
- The table only shows the period from the first to the last won medal, not all participation at the European Championships.

Top 10 skaters by total medals won at the European Championships
No.	Skater	Nation	Discipline(s)	Period	Gold medal – first place	Silver medal – second place	Bronze medal – third place	Total	Ref.
1	Irina Rodnina	Soviet Union	Pairs	1969–1980	11	–	–	11	
2	Carolina Kostner	Italy	Women's singles	2006–2018	5	2	4	11	
3	Ulrich Salchow	Sweden	Men's singles	1898–1913	9	–	1	10	
4	Karl Schäfer	Austria	Men's singles	1927–1936	8	1	1	10	
5	Evgeni Plushenko	Russia	Men's singles	1998–2012	7	3	–	10	
6	Ernst Baier	Germany	Pairs	1931–1939	5	3	2	10	
6	Ernst Baier	Germany	Men's singles	1931–1939	5	3	2	10	
7	Brian Joubert	France	Men's singles	2002–2011	3	3	4	10	
8	Irina Slutskaya	Russia	Women's singles	1996–2006	7	2	–	9	
9	Marika Kilius	West Germany	Pairs	1955–1964	6	–	3	9	
10	Alain Giletti	France	Men's singles	1953–1961	5	4	–	9	

== See also ==
- List of Olympic medalists in figure skating
- World Figure Skating Championships cumulative medal count
- Four Continents Figure Skating Championships cumulative medal count

== Works cited ==
- Hines, James R. (2006). Figure Skating: A History. University of Illinois Press. ISBN 978-0-252-07286-4.
- Hines, James R. (2015). Figure Skating in the Formative Years: Singles, Pairs, and the Expanding Role of Women. University of Illinois Press. ISBN 978-0-252-03906-5.
