= Alexander Zaitsev (pair skater) =

Soviet pair skater

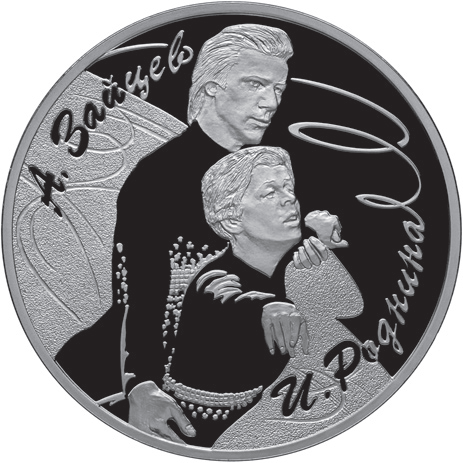

Personal information
- Full name: Alexander Gennadyevich Zaitsev
- Born: 16 June 1952 (age 74) Leningrad, RSFSR, Soviet Union
- Height: 5 ft 10 in (178 cm)

Figure skating career
- Country: Soviet Union
- Retired: 1980
Medal record
Figure skating: Pairs
Representing the Soviet Union
Olympic Games
Gold medal – first place	1980 Lake Placid	Pairs
Gold medal – first place	1976 Innsbruck	Pairs
World Championships
Gold medal – first place	1978 Ottawa	Pairs
Gold medal – first place	1977 Tokyo	Pairs
Gold medal – first place	1976 Gothenburg	Pairs
Gold medal – first place	1975 Colorado Springs	Pairs
Gold medal – first place	1974 Munich	Pairs
Gold medal – first place	1973 Bratislava	Pairs
European Championships
Gold medal – first place	1980 Gothenburg	Pairs
Gold medal – first place	1978 Strasbourg	Pairs
Gold medal – first place	1977 Helsinki	Pairs
Gold medal – first place	1976 Geneva	Pairs
Gold medal – first place	1975 Copenhagen	Pairs
Gold medal – first place	1974 Zagreb	Pairs
Gold medal – first place	1973 Cologne	Pairs

Alexander Gennadyevich Zaitsev (Russian: Александр Геннадьевич Зайцев, born 16 June 1952) is a Russian retired pair skater who represented the Soviet Union. With partner Irina Rodnina, he is a two-time (1976, 1980) Olympic champion, six-time World champion and seven-time European champion. They were coached by Stanislav Zhuk and later Tatiana Tarasova in Moscow.

From 1973 to 1980 they won every event they entered and are, to date, the most decorated pair team of all time.

== Career ==
In April 1972, Zaitsev was recommended by Stanislav Zhuk to Irina Rodnina as a potential partner. She was already a four-time World champion and 1972 Olympic gold medalist with her previous partner Alexei Ulanov, who had left her to skate with Lyudmila Smirnova. Zaitsev was three years younger than Rodnina and was much less seasoned but learned quickly. He was from Leningrad (Saint Petersburg) while she was from Moscow.

Rodnina / Zaitsev's music stopped during their short program at the 1973 World Championships, possibly due to a Czech worker acting in retaliation for the suppression of the Prague Spring. Known for intense concentration, they finished the program in silence, earning a standing ovation and a gold medal upon completion, ahead of Smirnova / Ulanov, whom they again defeated in 1974.

In 1974, Rodnina / Zaitsev left Zhuk, with whom the working relationship had become strained, to train with Tatiana Tarasova. They won six consecutive World titles together, as well as seven European gold medals, and won their first Olympic title together in 1976. Rodnina / Zaitsev did not compete during the 1978–79 season because she was pregnant with their son, who was born on 23 February 1979. They returned in 1980 to capture their second Olympic title together and Rodnina's third. They then retired from competitive skating. In 2023, Zaitsev's medal for the 1980 Olympics was sold at the RR Auction auction house for $93,000 (including the buyer's premium). Zaitsev himself said that he had nothing to do with the sale, the medal was kept by the parents of his ex-wife.

After retiring from competition, Zaitsev became a coach and for a time was involved in the administration of the sport.

== Personal life ==
Rodnina and Zaitsev were married in April 1975. Their son, also named Alexander, was born in 1979. The pair later divorced.

== Results ==
Pairs with Irina Rodnina

Event	1972–73	1973–74	1974–75	1975–76	1976–77	1977–78	1978–79	1979–80
Winter Olympics				1st				1st
World Championships	1st	1st	1st	1st	1st	1st		
European Championships	1st	1st	1st	1st	1st	1st		1st
Soviet Championships	1st	1st	1st		1st			
Prize of Moscow News						1st		

== See also ==
- USSR at the Winter Olympics
