= Doreen Denny =

British ice dancer (born 1941)

Personal information
- Full name: Doreen Denny
- Born: 28 January 1941 (age 85)

Figure skating career
- Country: United Kingdom
- Partner: Courtney Jones
- Retired: 1961
Medal record
Figure skating
Ice dancing
Representing United Kingdom
World Championships
Gold medal – first place	1960 Vancouver	Ice dancing
Gold medal – first place	1959 Colorado Springs	Ice dancing
European Championships
Gold medal – first place	1961 West Berlin	Ice dancing
Gold medal – first place	1960 Garmisch-Partenkirchen	Ice dancing
Gold medal – first place	1959 Davos	Ice dancing
Commonwealth Winter Games
Silver medal – second place	1958 St Moritz	Figure Skating - Women's Singles

Doreen Denny (born 28 January 1941) is a British retired ice dancer. With partner Courtney Jones, she is the 1959 & 1960 World champion and 1959-1961 European champion.

After the 1961 season, Denny and Jones announced their retirement from competitive skating, as Denny planned to marry Italian dance champion Gianfranco Canepa and move to the Continent.

Following her retirement from competitive skating, she became a coach. She coached at the Broadmoor Skating Club and among her students were Colleen O'Connor & Jim Millns, whom she coached to an Olympic medal.

In 1982, Denny's 1959 World Champion tray was stolen during a burglary at her home. It was returned to her in 2010.

== Results ==
(with Courtney Jones)

Event	1959	1960	1961
World Championships	1st	1st	
European Championships	1st	1st	1st
British Championships	1st	1st	1st
