= Alexei Ulanov =

Soviet pair skater

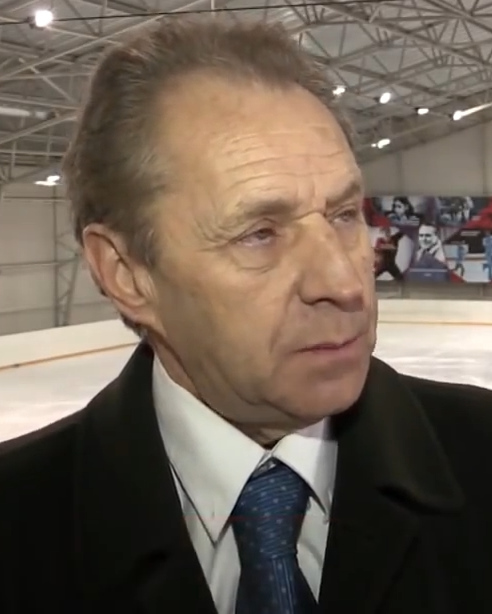
- Alexei Ulanov in 2015

Personal information
- Full name: Alexei Nikolaevich Ulanov
- Born: 4 November 1947 (age 78) Moscow, Russian SFSR, Soviet Union
- Height: 176 cm (5 ft 9 in)

Figure skating career
- Country: Soviet Union
- Skating club: Soviet Army Moscow
- Retired: 1980
Medal record
Representing Soviet Union
Olympic Games
Gold medal – first place	1972 Sapporo	Pairs
World Championships
Silver medal – second place	1974 Munich	Pairs
Silver medal – second place	1973 Bratislava	Pairs
Gold medal – first place	1972 Calgary	Pairs
Gold medal – first place	1971 Lyon	Pairs
Gold medal – first place	1970 Ljubljana	Pairs
Gold medal – first place	1969 Colorado Springs	Pairs
European Championships
Bronze medal – third place	1974 Zagreb	Pairs
Silver medal – second place	1973 Cologne	Pairs
Gold medal – first place	1972 Gothenburg	Pairs
Gold medal – first place	1971 Zürich	Pairs
Gold medal – first place	1970 Leningrad	Pairs
Gold medal – first place	1969 Garmisch-Partenkirchen	Pairs

Alexei Nikolaevich Ulanov (Russian: Алексей Николаевич Уланов; born 4 November 1947) is a retired pair skater who represented the Soviet Union. With Irina Rodnina, he is the 1972 Olympic champion and a four-time (1969–1972) world champion. With his then-wife Lyudmila Smirnova, he is a two-time world silver medalist.

== Career ==
Ulanov began figure skating in 1954 and became a member of the USSR National Team in 1964. Rodnina / Ulanov began skating together in the 1960s and won several World and European Championships. They were coached by Stanislav Zhuk and trained at the Armed Forces sports society in Moscow. The culmination of their career was their 1972 Olympics win. By this point Ulanov had fallen in love with fellow skater Lyudmila Smirnova. Rodnina and Ulanov separated, and Ulanov began skating with Smirnova.

Smirnova and Ulanov competed together for two seasons. They won silver medals at the 1973 World and European Championships. The next season, they won European bronze and world silver medals.

Ulanov was awarded the Order of the Red Banner of Labour in 1972.

== Personal life ==
Ulanov and Smirnova married and later divorced after having two children, Nikolai Ulanov and Irina Ulanova. Irina became a pair skater, who skated with Alexander Smirnov and Maxim Trankov for about three years. Ulanov moved to the United States in 1995 and currently lives in South Florida.

== Results ==
=== With Rodnina ===
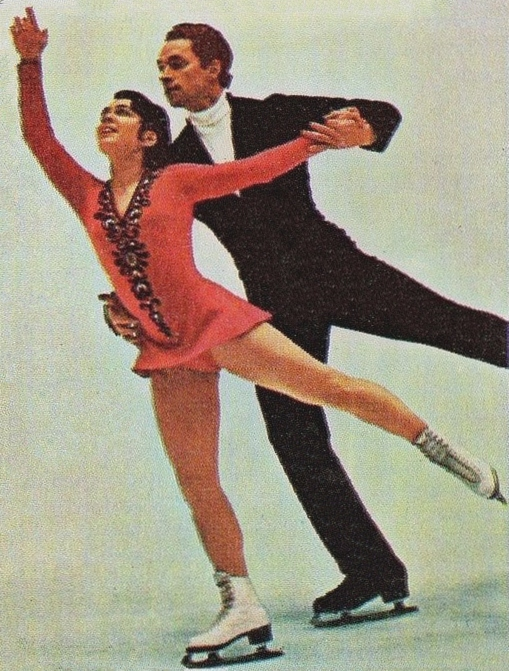
Ulanov and Rodnina in 1973

Event	1967–68	1968–69	1969–70	1970–71	1971–72
Winter Olympics					1st
World Championships		1st	1st	1st	1st
European Championships	5th	1st	1st	1st	1st
Soviet Championships	3rd	3rd	1st	1st	
Prize of Moscow News	1st	2nd	1st		

=== With Smirnova ===
Event	1972–1973	1973–1974
World Championships	2nd	2nd
European Championships	2nd	3rd
Soviet Championships	3rd	
Prize of Moscow News		1st
