= 2026 NHK Trophy =

Figure skating competition

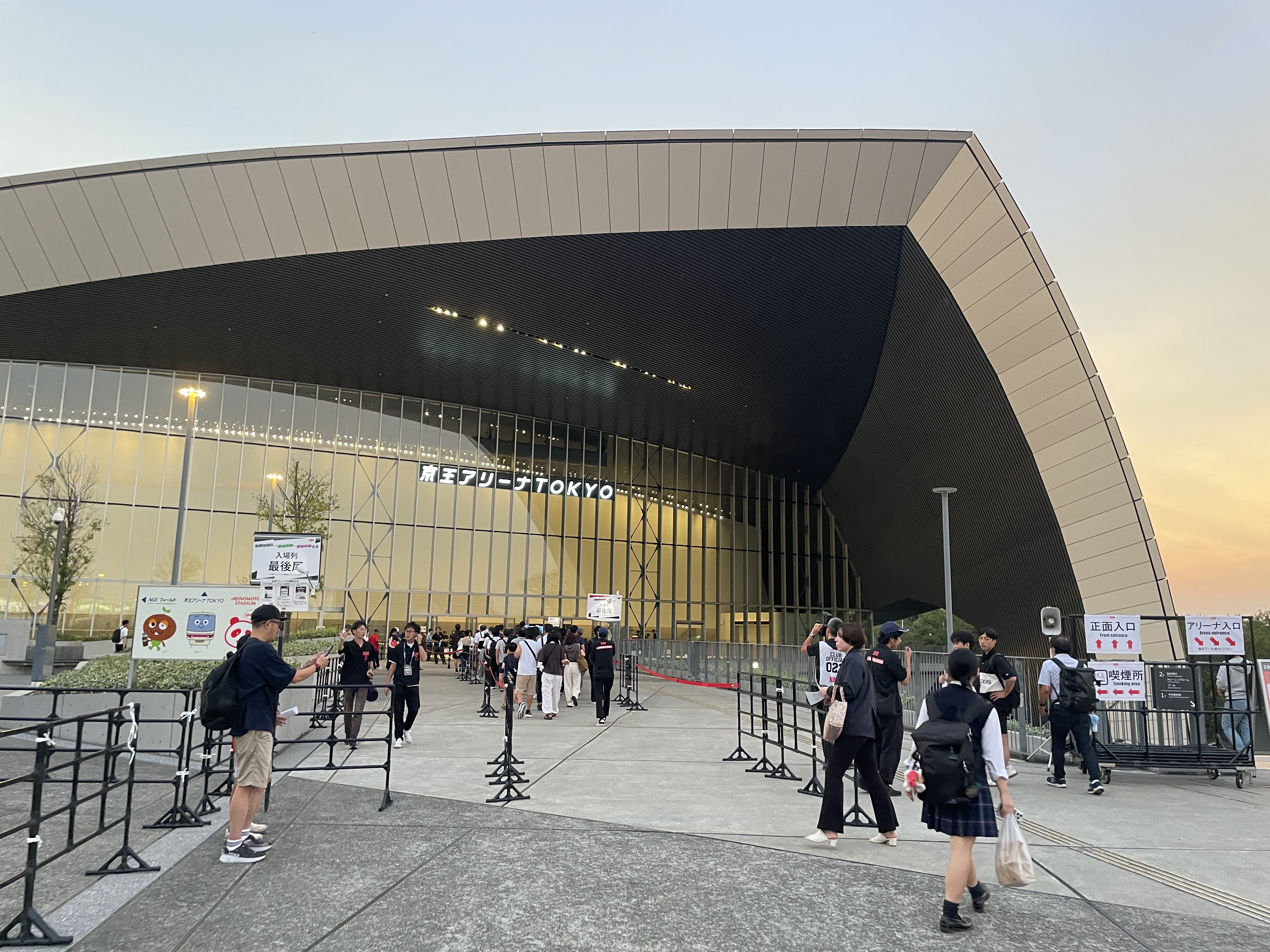
- Type: Grand Prix
- Date: November 27 – 29
- Season: 2026–27
- Location: Tokyo, Japan
- Host: Japan Skating Federation
- Venue: Keio Arena Tokyo
- Previous: 2025 NHK Trophy
- Next: 2027 NHK Trophy
- Previous Grand Prix: 2026 Finlandia Trophy
- Next Grand Prix: 2026–27 Grand Prix Final

The 2026 NHK Trophy is a figure skating competition sanctioned by the International Skating Union (ISU). Organized and hosted by Japan Skating Federation, it is the fourth event of the 2026–27 ISU Grand Prix of Figure Skating: a senior-level international invitational competition series. It will be held from November 27 to 29 at the Keio Arena Tokyo in Tokyo, Japan. Medals will be awarded in men's singles, women's singles, pair skating, and ice dance. Skaters will earn points based on their results, and the top skaters or teams in each discipline at the end of the season will be invited to then compete at the 2026–27 Grand Prix Final in Chongqing, China. Skaters can earn points towards the World Standings and Season's World Ranking based on their results.

== Background ==
The ISU Grand Prix of Figure Skating is a series of seven events sanctioned by the International Skating Union (ISU) and held during the autumn: six qualifying events and the Grand Prix of Figure Skating Final. This allows skaters to perfect their programs earlier in the season, as well as compete against the skaters whom they would later encounter at the World Championships. Skaters earn points based on their results in their respective competitions and the top skaters or teams in each discipline are invited to compete at the Grand Prix Final. The NHK Trophy debuted in 1979, and when the ISU launched the Grand Prix series in 1995, the NHK Trophy was one of the five qualifying events. It has been a Grand Prix event every year since.

The 2026 NHK Trophy is the sixth event of the 2026–27 ISU Grand Prix of Figure Skating series. It will be held from November 27 to 29 at the Keio Arena Tokyo in Tokyo, Japan.

== Entries ==
The International Skating Union published the initial list of entrants on June 16, 2026.

| Country | Men | Women | Pairs | Ice dance |
|---|---|---|---|---|
| Armenia | —N/a | | Karina Akopova; Nikita Rakhmanin | —N/a |
| Canada | —N/a | Madeline Schizas | Jazmine Desrochers; Kieran Thrasher | Marjorie Lajoie; Jean-Luc Baker |
| Czech Republic | —N/a | | Anna Valesi; Martin Bidař | —N/a |
| Spain | —N/a | | | Olivia Smart; Tim Dieck |
| Finland | —N/a | | | Yuka Orihara; Juho Pirinen |
| Finland | —N/a | | | Juulia Turkkila; Matthias Versluis |
| France | Kévin Aymoz | —N/a | Camille Kovalev; Pavel Kovalev | Loïcia Demougeot; Théo le Mercier |
| France | François Pitot | —N/a | | |
| Germany | —N/a | | Minerva Fabienne Hase; Nikita Volodin | —N/a |
| Italy | Daniel Grassl | —N/a | | |
| (Individual Neutral Athletes) Individual Neutral Athlete | Vladislav Dikidzhi | Adeliia Petrosian | —N/a | |
| (Individual Neutral Athletes) Individual Neutral Athlete | Petr Gumennik | Alina Gorbacheva | —N/a | |
| (Individual Neutral Athletes) Individual Neutral Athlete | —N/a | Viktoriia Safonova | —N/a | |
| Japan | Rio Nakata | Yuna Aoki | Yuna Nagaoka; Sumitada Moriguchi | Utana Yoshida; Masaya Morita |
| Japan | Shun Sato | Mone Chiba | —N/a | Ikura Kushida; Koshiro Shimada |
| Japan | Nozomu Yoshioka | Mako Yamashita | —N/a | Rika Kihira; Shingo Nishiyama |
| South Korea | —N/a | Shin Ji-a | —N/a | |
| South Korea | —N/a | You Young | —N/a | |
| Poland | Vlaidimir Samoilov | —N/a | | |
| Romania | —N/a | Julia Sauter | —N/a | |
| Switzerland | Lukas Britschgi | Kimmy Repond | —N/a | |
| United States | Jason Brown | Sarah Everhardt | Chelsea Liu; Ryan Bedard | Christina Carreira; Anthony Ponomarenko |
| United States | Ilia Malinin | —N/a | Naomi Williams; Lachlan Lewer | Emilea Zingas; Vadym Kolesnik |

== Changes to preliminary assignments ==
| Discipline | Withdrew | | Added | | Notes | Ref. |
| Discipline | Date | Skater(s) | Date | Skater(s) | Notes | Ref. |
|---|---|---|---|---|---|---|
| Pairs | July 31 | (Netherlands); Daria Danilova; Michel Tsiba | August 12 | (United States); Chelsea Liu; Ryan Bedard | Sitting out the season | |
| Women | August 21 | (France); Lorine Schild | August 31 | (Finland); Olivia Lisko | Taking a break | |
| Women | —N/a | | September 16 | (Japan); Mako Yamashita | Host picks | |
| Men | —N/a | | September 16 | (Japan); Nozomu Yoshioka | Host picks | |
| Ice dance | —N/a | | September 16 | (Japan); Rika Kihira; Shingo Nishiyama | Host picks | |
| Ice dance | —N/a | | September 16 | (Japan); Ikura Kushida; Koshiro Shimada | Host picks | |
| Men | October 12 | (South Korea); Cha Jun-hwan | October 14 | (Individual Neutral Athletes); Vladislav Dikidzhi | Taking season off | |
| Women | October 22 | (South Korea); Kim Chae-yeon | October 22 | (Individual Neutral Athletes); Adeliia Petrosian | | |
| Women | November 5 | (Finland); Olivia Lisko | November 6 | (Individual Neutral Athletes); Alina Gorbacheva | Injury | |
| Women | November 10 | (United States); Amber Glenn | November 11 | (Individual Neutral Athletes); Viktoriia Safonova | | |
| Men | November 12 | (Slovakia); Adam Hagara | November 13 | (Individual Neutral Athletes); Petr Gumennik | | |
