= Kim Chae-yeon =

Kim Chae-yeon (Korean: 김채연) may refer to:

- Kim Chae-yeon (actress) (born 1977), South Korean actress
- Kim Chae-yeon (singer) (born 2004), South Korean singer and member of TripleS
- Kim Chae-yeon (figure skater) (born 2006), South Korean figure skater
