= ISU Season's World Ranking =

Merit-based figure skating ranking

Figure skating records and statistics

Medal records
- Olympic Games; World Championships; European Championships; Four Continents Championships; Grand Prix of Figure Skating
- Other events: Grand Slam; Junior Grand Slam; Golden Slam; Junior Golden Slam; Super Slam

Highest scores statistics
- Current senior; Current junior; Historical senior; Historical junior

Rankings (current and statistics)
- World Standings; Season's World Ranking

The ISU Season's World Ranking (SWR) is the objective merit-based method used by the International Skating Union (ISU) for single & pair skating and ice dance.

Prior to 2010, the ISU used the former World Standings system for single & pair skating and ice dance. Starting with the 2010–11 season, the ISU implemented two separate rankings, namely the "ISU World Standings" and the "ISU Season's World Ranking".

The ISU Season's World Ranking is calculated using the results of the current ongoing season only. Its main purpose is to reflect the current competitive performances of the skaters and give the public and the media an indication of their current actual competitiveness. It combines both senior and junior skaters. Starting with the 2023–24 season, an independent ISU Season's World Ranking for juniors was established alongside the existing combined ranking.

== Principles and point distribution ==
The ISU Season's World Ranking does not necessarily reflect the capabilities of some skaters/teams. Due to limits on entries to events (no more than three from each country), and varying numbers of high-level skaters/teams in each country, skaters/teams from some countries may find it more difficult to qualify to compete at major events. Thus, a skater/team with a lower season's best but from a country with few high-level skaters/teams may qualify to a major event while a skater/team with a much higher season's best but from a country with more than three high-level skaters/teams may not be sent. As a result, it is possible for a skater/team who regularly scores higher to end up with a much lower ranking.

The principles and point distribution of the Season's World Ranking are in accordance to "ISU Communications 1629, 2550, and 2812" published by the ISU in 2010, 2023, and 2026 respectively.

Since the introduction of the current system back in 2010, the method used to calculate rankings has been amended several times. The latest amendment modified the distribution of points for each event, starting with the 2026–27 season. This new points system rewards higher-tiered international competitions over the lower-tiered, while also replacing the algorithmic '10% steps' point distribution with manually tailored point spreads.

The Season's World Ranking is calculated from the results of the current season. The number of points scored by each skater/team depends on the final placement and the total amount of points designated for that particular event. The Season's World Ranking is finalized after the World Championships.

The following events earn points, with limits on how many results go towards a skater/team's SWR:

- ISU Championships (Worlds, Europeans, Four Continents, and Junior Worlds) and Olympic Winter Games: The best result by points of the current season.
- ISU Grand Prix (including Semi-Finals (from 2027/28) and Final) and ISU Junior Grand Prix (including Final): The two best results by points of the current season.
- International Competitions Senior (including ISU Challenger Series) and Junior: The two best results by points of the current season.

The Season's World Ranking order will be updated after each event mentioned in the following point distribution table.

Distribution of points

Place	WC/OWG	GPF	EC/FC	WJC	GPSF	GP	JGPF	JGP	CS	IC	JIC
1	1300	1000	850	600	750	500	450	300	350	200	100
2	1150	880	760	540	670	450	400	270	310	150	80
3	1020	780	680	490	590	400	360	245	275	100	60
4	900	700	610	450	510	360	320	220	240		40
5	810	640	550	410	430	320	280	200	210		20
6	740	600	500	370	350	280	250	180	185		
7	680		460	340		240		160	165		
8	630		420	310		200		140	150		
9	580		380	280				120			
10	530		340	250				100			
11	480		300	220							
12	430		260	190							
13	380		230	160							
14	330		200	140							
15	290		180	120							
16	250		160	110							
17	210		140	100							
18	180		120	90							
19	150		110	80							
20	130		100	70							
21	120		90	65							
22	110		80	60							
23	105		75	55							
24	100		70	50							
Event total	11605	4600	7665	5550	3300	2750	2060	1935	1885	450	300

- WC = World Championships
- OWG = Olympic Winter Games
- GPF = Grand Prix Final
- EC = European Championships
- FC = Four Continents Championships
- WJC = World Junior Championships
- GPSF = Grand Prix Semi-Finals (from 2027/28)
- GP = Grand Prix
- JGPF = Junior Grand Prix Final
- JGP = Junior Grand Prix
- CS = Challenger Series
- IC = Senior International Competition
- JIC = Junior International Competition

== Current rankings ==
=== Ongoing 2026–27 season ===
Season's World Ranking for the current ongoing figure skating season.

==== Men's singles ====
Top 10 as of November 15, 2026
Rank	Nation	Skater	Points
1	EST	Aleksandr Selevko	1260
2	AIN	Vladislav Dikidzhi	1150
3	JPN	Kao Miura	1115
4	ITA	Daniel Grassl	1110
5	AIN	Evgeni Semenenko	1025
5	EST	Mihhail Selevko	1025
7	KOR	Seo Min-kyu	880
8	UKR	Kyrylo Marsak	770
9	GER	Genrikh Gartung	750
10	BEL	Denis Krouglov	720

==== Women's singles ====
Top 10 as of November 15, 2026
Rank	Nation	Skater	Points
1	AIN	Alexandra Ignatova	1560
2	JPN	Ami Nakai	1240
3	KOR	Kim Yu-jae	1220
4	EST	Niina Petrõkina	1150
5	GEO	Anastasiia Gubanova	1050
6	KOR	Kim Yu-seong	1020
7	ITA	Lara Naki Gutmann	995
8	KAZ	Sofia Samodelkina	915
9	JPN	Mao Shimada	850
10	SVK	Olívia Lengyelová	755

==== Pairs ====
Top 10 as of November 15, 2026
Rank	Nation	Team	Points
1	GEO	Anastasiia Metelkina; Luka Berulava	1300
2	AIN	Aleksandra Boikova; Dmitrii Kozlovskii	1150
3	CAN	Ava Kemp; Yohnatan Elizarov	1080
4	SUI	Oxana Vouillamoz; Tom Bouvart	970
5	USA	Alisa Efimova; Misha Mitrofanov	900
5	USA	Audrey Shin; Spencer Howe	900
7	USA	Katie McBeath; Balázs Nagy	885
8	CAN	Lia Pereira; Trennt Michaud	850
9	AIN	Anastasia Mishina; Aleksandr Galliamov	810
10	CHN	Jiaxuan Zhang; Yihang Huang	755

==== Ice dance ====
Top 10 as of November 15, 2026
Rank	Nation	Team	Points
1	GEO	Diana Davis; Gleb Smolkin	1600
2	FRA	Evgeniia Lopareva; Geoffrey Brissaud	1210
3	GBR	Lilah Fear; Lewis Gibson	1200
4	ESP	Olivia Smart; Tim Dieck	1060
5	CZE	Kateřina Mrázková; Daniel Mrázek	990
6	CZE	Natálie Taschlerová; Filip Taschler	985
7	USA	Leah Neset; Artem Markelov	950
8	ITA	Noemi Maria Tali; Noah Lafornara	890
9	USA	Caroline Green; Michael Parsons	885
10	USA	Katarina Wolfkostin; Dimitry Tsarevski	825

=== Completed 2025–26 season ===
Season's World Ranking for the most recently completed figure skating season.

==== Men's singles ====
Top 10 for 2025–26 season
Rank	Nation	Skater	Points
1	USA	Ilia Malinin	2700
2	JPN	Yuma Kagiyama	2470
3	KAZ	Mikhail Shaidorov	2332
4	JPN	Shun Sato	2239
5	FRA	Adam Siao Him Fa	2120
6	GEO	Nika Egadze	1996
7	CAN	Stephen Gogolev	1933
8	ITA	Daniel Grassl	1760
9	SUI	Lukas Britschgi	1741
10	JPN	Kazuki Tomono	1723

==== Women's singles ====
Top 10 for 2025–26 season
Rank	Nation	Skater	Points
1	USA	Alysa Liu	2619
2	JPN	Mone Chiba	2575
3	JPN	Kaori Sakamoto	2518
4	JPN	Ami Nakai	2362
5	USA	Amber Glenn	2070
6	USA	Isabeau Levito	2046
7	ITA	Lara Naki Gutmann	1839
8	USA	Bradie Tennell	1694
9	KOR	Jia Shin	1535
10	GEO	Anastasiia Gubanova	1467

==== Pairs ====
Top 10 for 2025–26 season
Rank	Nation	Team	Points
1	JPN	Riku Miura / Ryuichi Kihara	2970
2	GER	Minerva Fabienne Hase / Nikita Volodin	2818
3	GEO	Anastasiia Metelkina / Luka Berulava	2633
4	ITA	Sara Conti / Niccolo Macii	2329
5	USA	Alisa Efimova / Misha Mitrofanov	1975
6	HUN	Maria Pavlova / Alexei Sviatchenko	1760
7	JPN	Yuna Nagaoka / Sumitada Moriguchi	1702
8	USA	Emily Chan / Spencer Akira Howe	1628
9	CAN	Deanna Stellato-Dudek / Maxime Deschamps	1590
10	CAN	Lia Pereira / Trennt Michaud	1526

==== Ice dance ====
Top 10 for 2025–26 season
Rank	Nation	Team	Points
1	GBR	Lilah Fear / Lewis Gibson	2473
2	FRA	Laurence Fournier Beaudry / Guillaume Cizeron	2320
3	USA	Madison Chock / Evan Bates	2280
4	USA	Emilea Zingas / Vadym Kolesnik	2074
5	CAN	Piper Gilles / Paul Poirer	2063
6	ESP	Olivia Smart / Tim Dieck	1971
7	FRA	Evgeniia Lopareva / Geoffrey Brissaud	1876
8	ITA	Charlène Guignard / Marco Fabbri	1827
9	LTU	Allison Reed / Saulius Ambrulevičius	1819
10	GEO	Diana Davis / Gleb Smolkin	1594

== Records and statistics ==
=== Season No. 1 skaters ===
Complete lists, by discipline, of:

- season's No. 1 ordered chronologically
- total skaters/teams with a season No. 1 by nation
- total season No. 1s by nation
- total season No. 1s by skater/team
- consecutive season No. 1s by skater/team
- top 3 youngest/oldest season No. 1 skaters

==== Men's singles ====
Updated through 2025–26 season

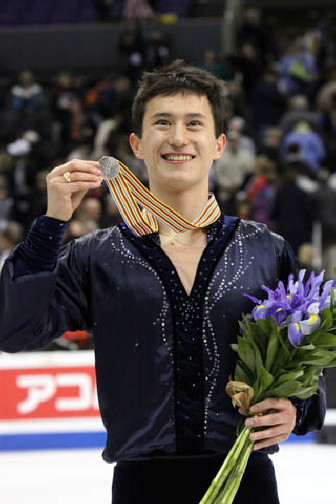
(Canada) Patrick Chan

Chronological

Season's No. 1 (men's)
Season	Nation	Skater	Points	Date^{*}	Age	Ref
2010–11	CAN	Patrick Chan	2400	April 28, 2011	20 years, 118 days	
2011–12	CAN	Patrick Chan	2400	March 31, 2012	21 years, 91 days	
2012–13	CAN	Patrick Chan	2248	March 15, 2013	22 years, 74 days	
2013–14	JPN	Yuzuru Hanyu	2610	March 28, 2014	19 years, 111 days	
2014–15	ESP	Javier Fernández	2320	March 28, 2015	23 years, 347 days	
2015–16	JPN	Yuzuru Hanyu	2530	April 1, 2016	21 years, 116 days	
2016–17	JPN	Yuzuru Hanyu	2700	April 1, 2017	22 years, 115 days	
2017–18	USA	Nathan Chen	2700	March 24, 2018	18 years, 323 days	
2018–19	USA	Nathan Chen	2400	March 23, 2019	19 years, 322 days	
2019–20	JPN	Yuzuru Hanyu	2260	April 16, 2020^{#}	25 years, 131 days	
2020–21	USA	Nathan Chen	1200	March 27, 2021	21 years, 326 days	
2021–22	USA	Vincent Zhou	2282	March 26, 2022	21 years, 152 days	
2022–23	JPN	Shoma Uno	2400	March 25, 2023	25 years, 98 days	
2023–24	USA	Ilia Malinin	2700	March 23, 2024	19 years, 112 days	
2024–25	USA	Ilia Malinin	2700	March 29, 2025	20 years, 117 days	
2025–26	USA	Ilia Malinin	2700	March 28, 2026	21 years, 116 days	

^{*}Date the free skating of the World Championships was held.

^{#}Date the 2020 World Championships were officially cancelled.

Statistics

Total skaters with a season No. 1 by nation (men's)
Rk	Nation	Total skaters	Skater
1	USA	3	Nathan Chen, Vincent Zhou, Ilia Malinin
2	JPN	2	Yuzuru Hanyu, Shoma Uno
3	CAN	1	Patrick Chan
3	ESP	1	Javier Fernández

Total season No. 1s by nation (men's)
Rk	Nation	Total	Season
1	USA	7	2017–18, 2018–19, 2020–21, 2021–22, 2023–24, 2024–25, 2025–26
2	JPN	5	2013–14, 2015–16, 2016–17, 2019–20, 2022–23
3	CAN	3	2010–11, 2011–12, 2012–13
4	ESP	1	2014–15

Total season No. 1s by skater (men's)
Rk	Nation	Skater	Total	Season
1	JPN	Yuzuru Hanyu	4	2013–14, 2015–16, 2016–17, 2019–20
2	CAN	Patrick Chan	3	2010–11, 2011–12, 2012–13
2	USA	Nathan Chen	3	2017–18, 2018–19, 2020–21
2	USA	Ilia Malinin	3	2023–24, 2024–25, 2025–26
5	ESP	Javier Fernández	1	2014–15
5	USA	Vincent Zhou	1	2021–22
5	JPN	Shoma Uno	1	2022–23

Consecutive season No. 1s by skater (men's)
Rk	Nation	Skater	Consecutive seasons^{*}	Season
1	CAN	Patrick Chan	3	2010–11, 2011–12, 2012–13
1	USA	Ilia Malinin	**3**	**2023–24, 2024–25, 2025–26**
3	JPN	Yuzuru Hanyu	2	2015–16, 2016–17
3	USA	Nathan Chen	2	2017–18, 2018–19

Bold = consecutive streak is active

^{*At least 2 seasons in a row as season No. 1}

Top 3 youngest/oldest season No. 1 skaters (men's)
	Rk	Season	Skater	Age	Birthday	Date^{*}	Ref
Youngest skaters	1	2017–18	(United States) Nathan Chen	18 years, 323 days	May 5, 1999	March 24, 2018	
Youngest skaters	2	2013–14	(Japan) Yuzuru Hanyu	19 years, 111 days	December 7, 1994	March 28, 2014	
Youngest skaters	3	2023–24	(United States) Ilia Malinin	19 years, 112 days	December 2, 2004	March 23, 2024	
	Rk	Season	Skater	Age	Birthday	Date^{*}	
Oldest skaters	1	2019–20	(Japan) Yuzuru Hanyu	25 years, 131 days	December 7, 1994	April 16, 2020^{#}	
Oldest skaters	2	2022–23	(Japan) Shoma Uno	25 years, 98 days	December 17, 1997	March 25, 2023	
Oldest skaters	3	2014–15	(Spain) Javier Fernández	23 years, 347 days	April 15, 1991	March 28, 2015	

^{*}Date the free skating of the World Championships was held.

^{#}Date the 2020 World Championships were officially cancelled.

==== Women's singles ====
Updated through 2025–26 season

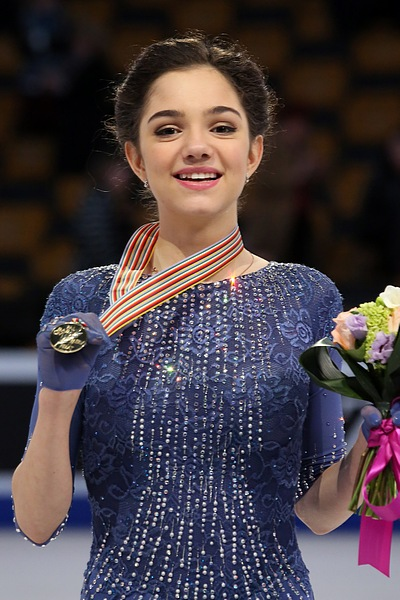
(Russia) Evgenia Medvedeva

Chronological

Season's No. 1 (women's)
Season	Nation	Skater	Points	Date^{*}	Age	Ref
2010–11	ITA	Carolina Kostner	2342	April 30, 2011	24 years, 81 days	
2011–12	ITA	Carolina Kostner	2650	March 31, 2012	25 years, 52 days	
2012–13	JPN	Mao Asada	2172	March 16, 2013	22 years, 172 days	
2013–14	RUS	Yulia Lipnitskaya	2450	March 29, 2014	15 years, 297 days	
2014–15	RUS	Elizaveta Tuktamysheva	3000	March 28, 2015	18 years, 101 days	
2015–16	RUS	Evgenia Medvedeva	2700	April 2, 2016	16 years, 135 days	
2016–17	RUS	Evgenia Medvedeva	2400	March 31, 2017	17 years, 132 days	
2017–18	RUS	Alina Zagitova	2700	March 23, 2018	15 years, 309 days	
2018–19	JPN	Rika Kihira	2625	March 22, 2019	16 years, 244 days	
2019–20	RUS	Alena Kostornaia	2340	April 16, 2020^{#}	16 years, 236 days	
2020–21	RUS	Anna Shcherbakova	1200	March 26, 2021	16 years, 363 days	
2021–22	RUS	Anna Shcherbakova	2225	March 25, 2022	17 years, 362 days	
2022–23	JPN	Kaori Sakamoto	2645	March 24, 2023	22 years, 349 days	
2023–24	JPN	Kaori Sakamoto	2950	March 22, 2024	23 years, 348 days	
2024–25	JPN	Kaori Sakamoto	2371	March 28, 2025	24 years, 353 days	
2025–26	USA	Alysa Liu	2619	March 27, 2026	20 years, 231 days	

^{*}Date the free skating of the World Championships was held.

^{#}Date the 2020 World Championships were officially cancelled.

Statistics

Total skaters with a season No. 1 by nation (women's)
Rk	Nation	Total skaters	Skater
1	RUS	6	Yulia Lipnitskaya, Elizaveta Tuktamysheva, Evgenia Medvedeva, Alina Zagitova, Alena Kostornaia, Anna Shcherbakova,
2	JPN	3	Mao Asada, Rika Kihira, Kaori Sakamoto
3	ITA	1	Carolina Kostner
3	USA	1	Alysa Liu

Total season No. 1s by nation (women's)
Rk	Nation	Total	Season
1	RUS	8	2013–14, 2014–15, 2015–16, 2016–17, 2017–18, 2019–20, 2020–21, 2021–22
2	JPN	5	2012–13, 2018–19, 2022–23, 2023–24, 2024–25
3	ITA	2	2010–11, 2011–12,
4	USA	1	2025–26

Total season No. 1s by skater (women's)
Rk	Nation	Skater	Total	Season
1	JPN	Kaori Sakamoto	3	2022–23, 2023–24, 2024–25
2	ITA	Carolina Kostner	2	2010–11, 2011–12
2	RUS	Evgenia Medvedeva	2	2015–16, 2016–17
2	RUS	Anna Shcherbakova	2	2020–21, 2021–22
5	JPN	Mao Asada	1	2012–13
5	RUS	Yulia Lipnitskaya	1	2013–14
5	RUS	Elizaveta Tuktamysheva	1	2014–15
5	RUS	Alina Zagitova	1	2017–18
5	JPN	Rika Kihira	1	2018–19
5	RUS	Alena Kostornaia	1	2019–20
5	USA	Alysa Liu	1	2025–26

Consecutive season No. 1s by skater (women's)
Rk	Nation	Skater	Consecutive seasons^{*}	Season
1	JPN	Kaori Sakamoto	3	2022–23, 2023–24, 2024–25
2	ITA	Carolina Kostner	2	2010–11, 2011–12
2	RUS	Evgenia Medvedeva	2	2015–16, 2016–17
2	RUS	Anna Shcherbakova	2	2020–21, 2021–22

Bold = consecutive streak is active

^{*At least 2 seasons in a row as season No. 1}

Top 3 youngest/oldest season No. 1 skaters (women's)
	Rk	Season	Skater	Age	Birthday	Date^{*}	Ref
Youngest skaters	1	2013–14	(Russia) Yulia Lipnitskaya	15 years, 297 days	June 5, 1998	March 29, 2014	
Youngest skaters	2	2017–18	(Russia) Alina Zagitova	15 years, 309 days	May 18, 2002	March 23, 2018	
Youngest skaters	3	2015–16	(Russia) Evgenia Medvedeva	16 years, 135 days	November 19, 1999	April 2, 2016	
	Rk	Season	Skater	Age	Birthday	Date^{*}	
Oldest skaters	1	2011–12	(Italy) Carolina Kostner	25 years, 52 days	February 8, 1987	March 31, 2012	
Oldest skaters	2	2024–25	(Japan) Kaori Sakamoto	24 years, 353 days	April 9, 2000	March 28, 2025	
Oldest skaters	3	2012–13	(Japan) Mao Asada	22 years, 172 days	September 25, 1990	March 16, 2013	

^{*}Date the free skating of the World Championships was held.

==== Pairs ====
Updated through 2025–26 season

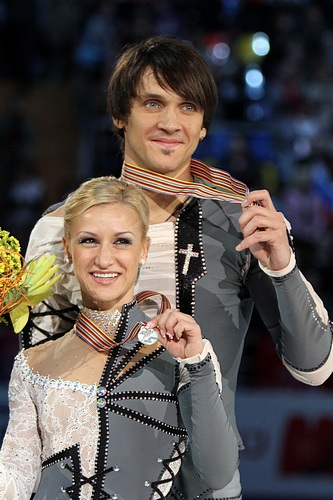
(Russia) Tatiana Volosozhar / Maxim Trankov

Chronological

Season's No. 1 (pairs)
Season	Nation	Team	Points	Date^{*}	Age	Ref
2010–11	GER	Aliona Savchenko / Robin Szolkowy	2400	April 28, 2011	27 years, 99 days 31 years, 288 days	
2011–12	RUS	Tatiana Volosozhar / Maxim Trankov	2700	March 28, 2012	25 years, 311 days 28 years, 173 days	
2012–13	RUS	Tatiana Volosozhar / Maxim Trankov	2650	March 15, 2013	26 years, 297 days 29 years, 159 days	
2013–14	RUS	Tatiana Volosozhar / Maxim Trankov	2570	March 27, 2014	27 years, 309 days 30 years, 171 days	
2014–15	CAN	Meagan Duhamel / Eric Radford	2700	March 26, 2015	29 years, 108 days 30 years, 58 days	
2015–16	RUS	Ksenia Stolbova / Fedor Klimov	2375	April 2, 2016	24 years, 55 days 25 years, 208 days	
2016–17	RUS	Evgenia Tarasova / Vladimir Morozov	2432	March 30, 2017	22 years, 103 days 24 years, 149 days	
2017–18	GER	Aliona Savchenko / Bruno Massot	2670	March 22, 2018	34 years, 62 days 29 years, 53 days	
2018–19	RUS	Evgenia Tarasova / Vladimir Morozov	2428	March 21, 2019	24 years, 94 days 26 years, 140 days	
2019–20	CHN	Peng Cheng / Jin Yang	2119	April 16, 2020^{#}	22 years, 359 days 25 years, 336 days	
2020–21	RUS	Anastasia Mishina / Aleksandr Galliamov	1200	March 25, 2021	19 years, 335 days 21 years, 209 days	
2021–22	RUS	Evgenia Tarasova / Vladimir Morozov	2410	March 24, 2022	27 years, 97 days 29 years, 143 days	
2022–23	ITA	Sara Conti / Niccolò Macii	2480	March 23, 2023	22 years, 233 days 27 years, 156 days	
2023–24	GER	Minerva Fabienne Hase / Nikita Volodin	2742	March 21, 2024	24 years, 285 days 24 years, 266 days	
2024–25	JPN	Riku Miura / Ryuichi Kihara	2590	March 27, 2025	23 years, 100 days 32 years, 217 days	
2025–26	JPN	Riku Miura / Ryuichi Kihara	2970	March 26, 2026	24 years, 99 days 33 years, 216 days	

^{*}Date the free skating of the World Championships was held.

^{#}Date the 2020 World Championships were officially cancelled.

Statistics

Total teams with a season No. 1 by nation (pairs)
Rk	Nation	Total teams	Team
1	RUS	4	Tatiana Volosozhar / Maxim Trankov, Ksenia Stolbova / Fedor Klimov, Evgenia Tarasova / Vladimir Morozov, Anastasia Mishina / Aleksandr Galliamov
2	GER	3	Aliona Savchenko / Robin Szolkowy, Aliona Savchenko / Bruno Massot, Minerva Fabienne Hase / Nikita Volodin
3	CAN	1	Meagan Duhamel / Eric Radford
3	CHN	1	Peng Cheng / Jin Yang
3	ITA	1	Sara Conti / Niccolò Macii
3	JPN	1	Riku Miura / Ryuichi Kihara

Total season No. 1s by nation (pairs)
Rk	Nation	Total	Season
1	RUS	8	2011–12, 2012–13, 2013–14, 2015–16, 2016–17, 2018–19
2	GER	3	2010–11, 2017–18, 2023–24
3	JPN	2	2024–25, 2025–26
4	CAN	1	2014–15
4	CHN	1	2019–20
4	ITA	1	2022–23

Total season No. 1s by team (pairs)
Rk	Nation	Team	Total	Season
1	RUS	Tatiana Volosozhar / Maxim Trankov	3	2011–12, 2012–13, 2013–14
1	RUS	Evgenia Tarasova / Vladimir Morozov	3	2016–17, 2018–19, 2021–22
3	JPN	Riku Miura / Ryuichi Kihara	2	2024–25, 2025–26
4	GER	Aliona Savchenko / Robin Szolkowy	1	2010–11
4	CAN	Meagan Duhamel / Eric Radford	1	2014–15
4	RUS	Ksenia Stolbova / Fedor Klimov	1	2015–16
4	GER	Aliona Savchenko / Bruno Massot	1	2017–18
4	CHN	Peng Cheng / Jin Yang	1	2019–20
4	RUS	Anastasia Mishina / Aleksandr Galliamov	1	2020–21
4	ITA	Sara Conti / Niccolò Macii	1	2022–23
4	GER	Minerva Fabienne Hase / Nikita Volodin	1	2023–24

Consecutive season No. 1s by team (pairs)
Rk	Nation	Team	Consecutive seasons^{*}	Season
1	RUS	Tatiana Volosozhar / Maxim Trankov	3	2011–12, 2012–13, 2013–14
2	JPN	Riku Miura / Ryuichi Kihara	**2**	**2024–25, 2025–26**

Bold = consecutive streak is active

^{*At least 2 seasons in a row as season No. 1}

Top 3 youngest/oldest season No. 1 skaters (pairs)
	Rk	Season	Skater	Age	Birthday	Date^{*}	Ref
Youngest women	1	2020–21	(Russia) Anastasia Mishina	19 years, 335 days	April 24, 2001	March 25, 2021	
Youngest women	2	2016–17	(Russia) Evgenia Tarasova	22 years, 103 days	December 17, 1994	March 30, 2017	
Youngest women	3	2022–23	(Italy) Sara Conti	22 years, 233 days	August 2, 2000	March 23, 2023	
	Rk	Season	Skater	Age	Birthday	Date^{*}	
Youngest men	1	2020–21	(Russia) Aleksandr Galliamov	21 years, 209 days	August 28, 1999	March 25, 2021	
Youngest men	2	2016–17	(Russia) Vladimir Morozov	24 years, 149 days	November 1, 1992	March 30, 2017	
Youngest men	3	2023–24	(Germany) Nikita Volodin	24 years, 266 days	June 29, 1999	March 21, 2024	
	Rk	Season	Skater	Age	Birthday	Date^{*}	
Oldest women	1	2017–18	(Germany) Aliona Savchenko	34 years, 62 days	January 19, 1984	March 22, 2018	
Oldest women	2	2014–15	(Canada) Meagan Duhamel	29 years, 108 days	December 8, 1985	March 26, 2015	
Oldest women	3	2013–14	(Russia) Tatiana Volosozhar	27 years, 309 days	May 22, 1986	March 27, 2014	
	Rk	Season	Skater	Age	Birthday	Date^{*}	
Oldest men	1	2025–26	(Japan) Ryuichi Kihara	33 years, 216 days	August 22, 1992	March 26, 2026	
Oldest men	2	2010–11	(Germany) Robin Szolkowy	31 years, 288 days	July 14, 1979	April 28, 2011	
Oldest men	3	2013–14	(Russia) Maxim Trankov	30 years, 171 days	October 7, 1983	March 27, 2014	

^{*}Date the free skating of the World Championships was held.

==== Ice dance ====
Updated through 2025–26 season

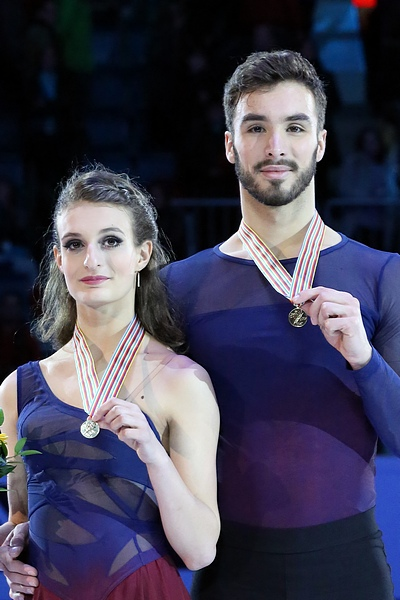
(France) Gabriella Papadakis / Guillaume Cizeron

Chronological

Season's No. 1 (ice dance)
Season	Nation	Team	Points	Date^{*}	Age	Ref
2010–11	FRA	Nathalie Péchalat / Fabian Bourzat	2495	April 30, 2011	27 years, 129 days 30 years, 132 days	
2011–12	CAN	Tessa Virtue / Scott Moir	2570	March 29, 2012	22 years, 317 days 24 years, 209 days	
2012–13	USA	Meryl Davis / Charlie White	2400	March 16, 2013	26 years, 74 days 25 years, 143 days	
2013–14	USA	Meryl Davis / Charlie White	2650	March 29, 2014	27 years, 87 days 26 years, 156 days	
2014–15	FRA	Gabriella Papadakis / Guillaume Cizeron	2548	March 27, 2015	19 years, 321 days 20 years, 135 days	
2015–16	USA	Madison Chock / Evan Bates	2392	March 31, 2016	23 years, 273 days 27 years, 37 days	
2016–17	CAN	Tessa Virtue / Scott Moir	2700	April 1, 2017	27 years, 319 days 29 years, 211 days	
2017–18	FRA	Gabriella Papadakis / Guillaume Cizeron	2700	March 24, 2018	22 years, 318 days 23 years, 132 days	
2018–19	USA	Madison Hubbell / Zachary Donohue	2472	March 23, 2019	28 years, 27 days 28 years, 74 days	
2019–20	USA	Madison Chock / Evan Bates	2520	April 16, 2020^{#}	27 years, 289 days 31 years, 53 days	
2020–21	RUS	Victoria Sinitsina / Nikita Katsalapov	1200	March 27, 2021	25 years, 332 days 29 years, 260 days	
2021–22	FRA	Gabriella Papadakis / Guillaume Cizeron	2300	March 26, 2022	26 years, 320 days 27 years, 134 days	
2022–23	ITA	Charlène Guignard / Marco Fabbri	2428	March 25, 2023	33 years, 225 days 35 years, 51 days	
2023–24	GBR	Lilah Fear / Lewis Gibson	2458	March 23, 2024	24 years, 286 days 29 years, 327 days	
2024–25	GBR	Lilah Fear / Lewis Gibson	2620	March 29, 2025	25 years, 291 days 30 years, 332 days	
2025–26	GBR	Lilah Fear / Lewis Gibson	2473	March 28, 2026	26 years, 290 days 31 years, 331 days	

^{*}Date the free dance of the World Championships was held.

^{#}Date the 2020 World Championships were officially cancelled.

Statistics

Total teams with a season No. 1 by nation (ice dance)
Rk	Nation	Total teams	Team
1	USA	3	Meryl Davis / Charlie White, Madison Chock / Evan Bates, Madison Hubbell / Zachary Donohue
2	FRA	2	Nathalie Péchalat / Fabian Bourzat, Gabriella Papadakis / Guillaume Cizeron
3	CAN	1	Tessa Virtue / Scott Moir
3	RUS	1	Victoria Sinitsina / Nikita Katsalapov
3	ITA	1	Charlène Guignard / Marco Fabbri
3	GBR	1	Lilah Fear / Lewis Gibson

Total season No. 1s by nation (ice dance)
Rk	Nation	Total	Season
1	USA	5	2012–13, 2013–14, 2015–16, 2018–19, 2019–20
2	FRA	4	2010–11, 2014–15, 2017–18, 2021–22
3	GBR	3	2023–24, 2024–25, 2025–26
4	CAN	2	2011–12, 2016–17
5	RUS	1	2020–21
5	ITA	1	2022–23

Total season No. 1s by team (ice dance)
Rk	Nation	Team	Total	Season
1	FRA	Gabriella Papadakis / Guillaume Cizeron	3	2014–15, 2017–18, 2021–22
1	GBR	Lilah Fear / Lewis Gibson	3	2023–24, 2024–25, 2025–26
3	CAN	Tessa Virtue / Scott Moir	2	2011–12, 2016–17
3	USA	Meryl Davis / Charlie White	2	2012–13, 2013–14
3	USA	Madison Chock / Evan Bates	2	2015–16, 2019–20
6	FRA	Nathalie Péchalat / Fabian Bourzat	1	2010–11
6	USA	Madison Hubbell / Zachary Donohue	1	2018–19
6	RUS	Victoria Sinitsina / Nikita Katsalapov	1	2020–21
6	ITA	Charlène Guignard / Marco Fabbri	1	2022–23

Consecutive season No. 1s by team (ice dance)
Rk	Nation	Team	Consecutive seasons^{*}	Season
1	GBR	Lilah Fear / Lewis Gibson	**3**	**2023–24, 2024–25, 2025–26**
2	USA	Meryl Davis / Charlie White	2	2012–13, 2013–14

Bold = consecutive streak is active

^{*At least 2 seasons in a row as season No. 1}

Top 3 youngest/oldest season No. 1 skaters (ice dance)
	Rk	Season	Skater	Age	Birthday	Date^{*}	Ref
Youngest women	1	2014–15	(France) Gabriella Papadakis	19 years, 321 days	May 10, 1995	March 27, 2015	
Youngest women	2	2011–12	(Canada) Tessa Virtue	22 years, 317 days	May 17, 1989	March 29, 2012	
Youngest women	3	2015–16	(United States) Madison Chock	23 years, 273 days	July 2, 1992	March 31, 2016	
	Rk	Season	Skater	Age	Birthday	Date^{*}	
Youngest men	1	2014–15	(France) Guillaume Cizeron	20 years, 135 days	November 12, 1994	March 27, 2015	
Youngest men	2	2011–12	(Canada) Scott Moir	24 years, 209 days	September 2, 1987	March 29, 2012	
Youngest men	3	2012–13	(United States) Charlie White	25 years, 143 days	October 24, 1987	March 16, 2013	
	Rk	Season	Skater	Age	Birthday	Date^{*}	
Oldest women	1	2022–23	(Italy) Charlène Guignard	33 years, 225 days	August 12, 1989	March 25, 2023	
Oldest women	2	2018–19	(United States) Madison Hubbell	28 years, 27 days	February 24, 1991	March 23, 2019	
Oldest women	3	2016–17	(Canada) Tessa Virtue	27 years, 319 days	May 17, 1989	April 1, 2017	
	Rk	Season	Skater	Age	Birthday	Date^{*}	
Oldest men	1	2022–23	(Italy) Marco Fabbri	35 years, 51 days	February 2, 1988	March 25, 2023	
Oldest men	2	2024–25	(United Kingdom) Lewis Gibson	31 years, 331 days	May 1, 1994	March 29, 2025	
Oldest men	3	2019–20	(United States) Evan Bates	31 years, 53 days	February 23, 1989	April 16, 2020^{#}	

^{*}Date the free dance of the World Championships was held.

^{#}Date the 2020 World Championships were officially cancelled.

==== All disciplines ====
Updated through 2025–26 season

Chronological

Season's No. 1 (each discipline)
Season	Men's singles	Women's singles	Pairs	Ice dance
2010–11	(Canada) Patrick Chan	(Italy) Carolina Kostner	(Germany) Aliona Savchenko / Robin Szolkowy	(France) Nathalie Péchalat / Fabian Bourzat
2011–12	(Canada) Patrick Chan	(Italy) Carolina Kostner	(Russia) Tatiana Volosozhar / Maxim Trankov	(Canada) Tessa Virtue / Scott Moir
2012–13	(Canada) Patrick Chan	(Japan) Mao Asada	(Russia) Tatiana Volosozhar / Maxim Trankov	(United States) Meryl Davis / Charlie White
2013–14	(Japan) Yuzuru Hanyu	(Russia) Yulia Lipnitskaya	(Russia) Tatiana Volosozhar / Maxim Trankov	(United States) Meryl Davis / Charlie White
2014–15	(Spain) Javier Fernández	(Russia) Elizaveta Tuktamysheva	(Canada) Meagan Duhamel / Eric Radford	(France) Gabriella Papadakis / Guillaume Cizeron
2015–16	(Japan) Yuzuru Hanyu	(Russia) Evgenia Medvedeva	(Russia) Ksenia Stolbova / Fedor Klimov	(United States) Madison Chock / Evan Bates
2016–17	(Japan) Yuzuru Hanyu	(Russia) Evgenia Medvedeva	(Russia) Evgenia Tarasova / Vladimir Morozov	(Canada) Tessa Virtue / Scott Moir
2017–18	(United States) Nathan Chen	(Russia) Alina Zagitova	(Germany) Aliona Savchenko / Bruno Massot	(France) Gabriella Papadakis / Guillaume Cizeron
2018–19	(United States) Nathan Chen	(Japan) Rika Kihira	(Russia) Evgenia Tarasova / Vladimir Morozov	(United States) Madison Hubbell / Zachary Donohue
2019–20	(Japan) Yuzuru Hanyu	(Russia) Alena Kostornaia	(China) Peng Cheng / Jin Yang	(United States) Madison Chock / Evan Bates
2020–21	(United States) Nathan Chen	(Russia) Anna Shcherbakova	(Russia) Anastasia Mishina / Aleksandr Galliamov	(Russia) Victoria Sinitsina / Nikita Katsalapov
2021–22	(United States) Vincent Zhou	(Russia) Anna Shcherbakova	(Russia) Evgenia Tarasova / Vladimir Morozov	(France) Gabriella Papadakis / Guillaume Cizeron
2022–23	(Japan) Shoma Uno	(Japan) Kaori Sakamoto	(Italy) Sara Conti / Niccolò Macii	(Italy) Charlène Guignard / Marco Fabbri
2023–24	(United States) Ilia Malinin	(Japan) Kaori Sakamoto	(Germany) Minerva Fabienne Hase / Nikita Volodin	(United Kingdom) Lilah Fear / Lewis Gibson
2024–25	(United States) Ilia Malinin	(Japan) Kaori Sakamoto	(Japan) Riku Miura / Ryuichi Kihara	(United Kingdom) Lilah Fear / Lewis Gibson
2025–26	(United States) Ilia Malinin	(United States) Alysa Liu	(Japan) Riku Miura / Ryuichi Kihara	(United Kingdom) Lilah Fear / Lewis Gibson

Statistics

Combined total skaters/teams with a season No. 1 by nation (all disciplines)
Rk	Nation	Number of disciplines	Total skaters/teams with a season No. 1				
Rk	Nation	Number of disciplines	Men's singles	Women's singles	Pairs	Ice dance	Combined Total
1	RUS	3	0	6	4	1	11
2	USA	3	3	1	0	3	7
3	JPN	3	2	3	1	0	6
4	CAN	3	1	0	1	1	3
4	ITA	3	0	1	1	1	3
4	GER	1	0	0	3	0	3
7	FRA	1	0	0	0	2	2
8	ESP	1	1	0	0	0	1
8	CHN	1	0	0	1	0	1
8	GBR	1	0	0	0	1	1

Combined total season No. 1s by nation (all disciplines)
Rk	Nation	Number of disciplines	Total season No. 1s				
Rk	Nation	Number of disciplines	Men's singles	Women's singles	Pairs	Ice dance	Combined Total
1	RUS	3	0	8	8	1	17
2	USA	3	7	1	0	5	13
3	JPN	3	5	5	2	0	12
4	CAN	3	3	0	1	2	6
5	FRA	1	0	0	0	4	4
5	ITA	3	0	2	1	1	4
7	GER	1	0	0	3	0	3
7	GBR	1	0	0	0	3	3
9	ESP	1	1	0	0	0	1
9	CHN	1	0	0	1	0	1

Total season No. 1s by skater/team (all disciplines)
Rk	Nation	Skater/Team	Discipline	Total	Season
1	JPN	Yuzuru Hanyu	Men's singles	4	2013–14, 2015–16, 2016–17, 2019–20
2	CAN	Patrick Chan	Men's singles	3	2010–11, 2011–12, 2012–13
2	RUS	Tatiana Volosozhar / Maxim Trankov	Pairs	3	2011–12, 2012–13, 2013–14
2	USA	Nathan Chen	Men's singles	3	2017–18, 2018–19, 2020–21
2	RUS	Evgenia Tarasova / Vladimir Morozov	Pairs	3	2016–17, 2018–19, 2021–22
2	FRA	Gabriella Papadakis / Guillaume Cizeron	Ice dance	3	2014–15, 2017–18, 2021–22
2	JPN	Kaori Sakamoto	Women's singles	3	2022–23, 2023–24, 2024–25
2	USA	Ilia Malinin	Men's singles	3	2023–24, 2024–25, 2025–26
2	GBR	Lilah Fear / Lewis Gibson	Ice dance	3	2023–24, 2024–25, 2025–26
10	ITA	Carolina Kostner	Women's singles	2	2010–11, 2011–12
10	USA	Meryl Davis / Charlie White	Ice dance	2	2012–13, 2013–14
10	RUS	Evgenia Medvedeva	Women's singles	2	2015–16, 2016–17
10	CAN	Tessa Virtue / Scott Moir	Ice dance	2	2011–12, 2016–17
10	USA	Madison Chock / Evan Bates	Ice dance	2	2015–16, 2019–20
10	RUS	Anna Shcherbakova	Women's singles	2	2020–21, 2021–22
10	JPN	Riku Miura / Ryuichi Kihara	Pairs	2	2024–25, 2025–26
17	GER	Aliona Savchenko / Robin Szolkowy	Pairs	1	2010–11
17	FRA	Nathalie Péchalat / Fabian Bourzat	Ice dance	1	2010–11
17	JPN	Mao Asada	Women's singles	1	2012–13
17	RUS	Yulia Lipnitskaya	Women's singles	1	2013–14
17	CAN	Meagan Duhamel / Eric Radford	Pairs	1	2014–15
17	RUS	Elizaveta Tuktamysheva	Women's singles	1	2014–15
17	ESP	Javier Fernández	Men's singles	1	2014–15
17	RUS	Ksenia Stolbova / Fedor Klimov	Pairs	1	2015–16
17	GER	Aliona Savchenko / Bruno Massot	Pairs	1	2017–18
17	RUS	Alina Zagitova	Women's singles	1	2017–18
17	JPN	Rika Kihira	Women's singles	1	2018–19
17	USA	Madison Hubbell / Zachary Donohue	Ice dance	1	2018–19
17	CHN	Peng Cheng / Jin Yang	Pairs	1	2019–20
17	RUS	Alena Kostornaia	Women's singles	1	2019–20
17	RUS	Anastasia Mishina / Aleksandr Galliamov	Pairs	1	2020–21
17	RUS	Victoria Sinitsina / Nikita Katsalapov	Ice dance	1	2020–21
17	USA	Vincent Zhou	Men's singles	1	2021–22
17	ITA	Sara Conti / Niccolò Macii	Pairs	1	2022–23
17	ITA	Charlène Guignard / Marco Fabbri	Ice dance	1	2022–23
17	JPN	Shoma Uno	Men's singles	1	2022–23
17	GER	Minerva Fabienne Hase / Nikita Volodin	Pairs	1	2023–24
17	USA	Alysa Liu	Women's singles	1	2025–26

Consecutive season No. 1s by skater/team (all disciplines)
Rk	Nation	Skater/Team	Discipline	Consecutive seasons^{*}	Season
1	CAN	Patrick Chan	Men's singles	3	2010–11, 2011–12, 2012–13
1	RUS	Tatiana Volosozhar / Maxim Trankov	Pairs	3	2011–12, 2012–13, 2013–14
1	JPN	Kaori Sakamoto	Women's singles	3	2022–23, 2023–24, 2024–25
1	USA	Ilia Malinin	Men's singles	**3**	**2023–24, 2024–25, 2025–26**
1	GBR	Lilah Fear / Lewis Gibson	Ice dance	**3**	**2023–24, 2024–25, 2025–26**
6	ITA	Carolina Kostner	Women's singles	2	2010–11, 2011–12
6	USA	Meryl Davis / Charlie White	Ice dance	2	2012–13, 2013–14
6	RUS	Evgenia Medvedeva	Women's singles	2	2015–16, 2016–17
6	JPN	Yuzuru Hanyu	Men's singles	2	2015–16, 2016–17
6	USA	Nathan Chen	Men's singles	2	2017–18, 2018–19
6	RUS	Anna Shcherbakova	Women's singles	2	2020–21, 2021–22
6	JPN	Riku Miura / Ryuichi Kihara	Pairs	**2**	**2024–25****, 2025–26**

Bold = consecutive streak is active

^{*At least 2 seasons in a row as season No. 1}

Top 3 youngest/oldest season No. 1 skaters (all disciplines)
	Rk	Season	Skater	Discipline	Age	Birthday	Date^{*}	Ref
Youngest women	1	2013–14	(Russia) Yulia Lipnitskaya	Women's singles	15 years, 297 days	June 5, 1998	March 29, 2014	
Youngest women	2	2017–18	(Russia) Alina Zagitova	Women's singles	15 years, 309 days	May 18, 2002	March 23, 2018	
Youngest women	3	2015–16	(Russia) Evgenia Medvedeva	Women's singles	16 years, 135 days	November 19, 1999	April 2, 2016	
	Rk	Season	Skater	Discipline	Age	Birthday	Date^{*}	
Youngest men	1	2017–18	(United States) Nathan Chen	Men's singles	18 years, 323 days	May 5, 1999	March 24, 2018	
Youngest men	2	2013–14	(Japan) Yuzuru Hanyu	Men's singles	19 years, 111 days	December 7, 1994	March 28, 2014	
Youngest men	3	2023–24	(United States) Ilia Malinin	Men's singles	19 years, 112 days	December 2, 2004	March 23, 2024	
	Rk	Season	Skater	Discipline	Age	Birthday	Date^{*}	
Oldest women	1	2017–18	(Germany) Aliona Savchenko	Pairs	34 years, 62 days	January 19, 1984	March 22, 2018	
Oldest women	2	2022–23	(Italy) Charlène Guignard	Ice dance	33 years, 225 days	August 12, 1989	March 25, 2023	
Oldest women	3	2014–15	(Canada) Meagan Duhamel	Pairs	29 years, 108 days	December 8, 1985	March 26, 2015	
	Rk	Season	Skater	Discipline	Age	Birthday	Date^{*}	
Oldest men	1	2022–23	(Italy) Marco Fabbri	Ice dance	35 years, 51 days	February 2, 1988	March 25, 2023	
Oldest men	2	2025–26	(Japan) Ryuichi Kihara	Pairs	33 years, 216 days	August 22, 1992	March 26, 2026	
Oldest men	3	2024–25	(United Kingdom) Lewis Gibson	Ice dance	31 years, 331 days	May 1, 1994	March 29, 2025	

^{*}Date the free skating/free dance of the World Championships was held.

^{#}Date the 2020 World Championships were officially cancelled.

=== Season top 3 skaters ===
Complete lists, by discipline, of:

- season's top 3 ordered chronologically
- total skaters/teams with a season top 3 by nation
- total season top 3s by nation
- total season top 3s by skater/team
- consecutive season top 3s by skater/team

==== Men's singles ====
Updated through 2025–26 season

Chronological

Season's top 3 (men's)
Season	Season's No. 1			Season's No. 2			Season's No. 3			Ref
Season	Nation	Skater	Points	Nation	Skater	Points	Nation	Skater	Points	Ref
2010–11	CAN	Patrick Chan	2400	JPN	Takahiko Kozuka	2128	RUS	Artur Gachinski	1921	
2011–12	CAN	Patrick Chan	2400	JPN	Yuzuru Hanyu	2205	JPN	Daisuke Takahashi	2200	
2012–13	CAN	Patrick Chan	2248	JPN	Yuzuru Hanyu	2245	ESP	Javier Fernández	2158	
2013–14	JPN	Yuzuru Hanyu	2610	JPN	Tatsuki Machida	2313	CAN	Patrick Chan	2200	
2014–15	ESP	Javier Fernández	2320	JPN	Yuzuru Hanyu	2240	RUS	Sergei Voronov	2207	
2015–16	JPN	Yuzuru Hanyu	2530	ESP	Javier Fernández	2320	JPN	Shoma Uno	1884	
2016–17	JPN	Yuzuru Hanyu	2700	JPN	Shoma Uno	2428	USA	Nathan Chen	2220	
2017–18	USA	Nathan Chen	2700	RUS	Mikhail Kolyada	2539	JPN	Shoma Uno	2500	
2018–19	USA	Nathan Chen	2400	JPN	Shoma Uno	2259	JPN	Yuzuru Hanyu	2180	
2019–20	JPN	Yuzuru Hanyu	2260	RUS	Dmitri Aliev	2242	CHN	Jin Boyang	1837	
2020–21	USA	Nathan Chen	1200	JPN	Yuma Kagiyama	1080	JPN	Yuzuru Hanyu	972	
2021–22	USA	Vincent Zhou	2282	JPN	Yuma Kagiyama	2130	JPN	Shoma Uno	1960	
2022–23	JPN	Shoma Uno	2400	USA	Ilia Malinin	2320	KOR	Cha Jun-hwan	2298	
2023–24	USA	Ilia Malinin	2700	FRA	Adam Siao Him Fa	2505	JPN	Yuma Kagiyama	2428	
2024–25	USA	Ilia Malinin	2700	JPN	Yuma Kagiyama	2362	KAZ	Mikhail Shaidorov	2265	
2025–26	USA	Ilia Malinin	2700	JPN	Yuma Kagiyama	2470	KAZ	Mikhail Shaidorov	2332	

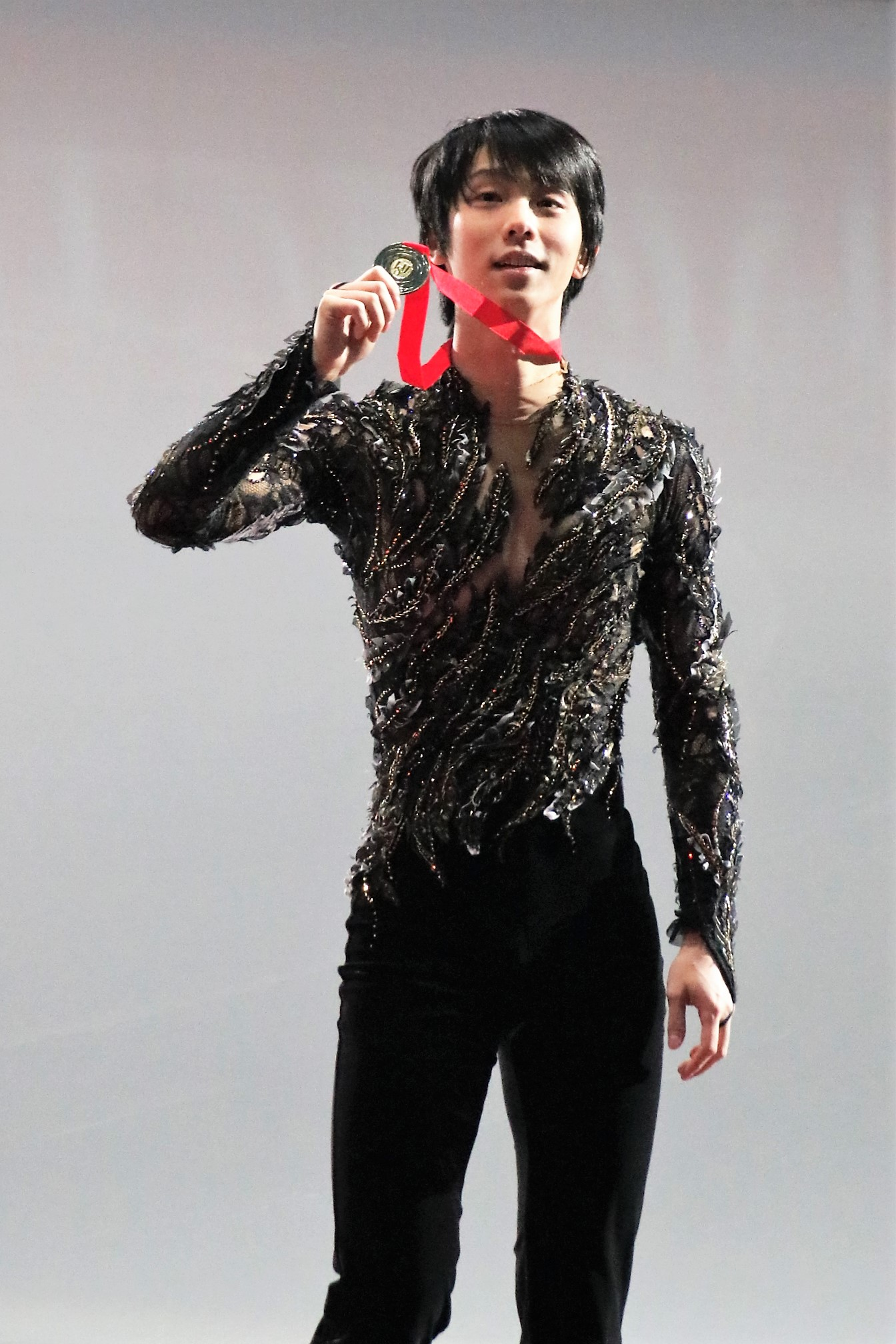
(Japan) Yuzuru Hanyu

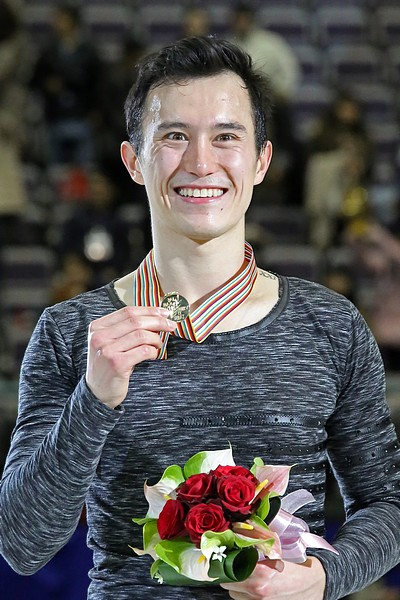
(Canada) Patrick Chan

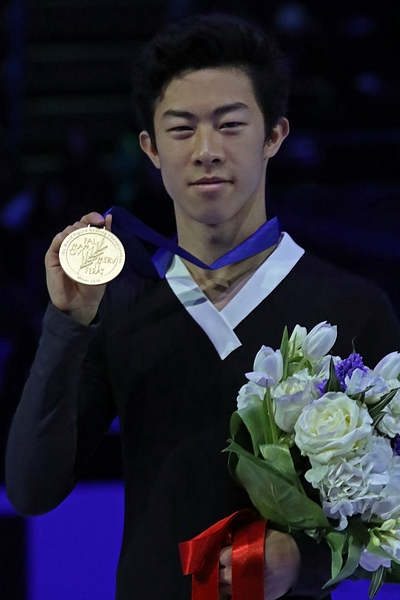
(United States) Nathan Chen

The skaters who have been in the season's top 3 the most times as of the 2020/21 season

Statistics

Total skaters with a season top 3 by nation (men's)
Rk	Nation	Total skaters	Skater
1	JPN	6	Takahiko Kozuka, Yuzuru Hanyu, Daisuke Takahashi, Tatsuki Machida, Shoma Uno, Yuma Kagiyama
2	RUS	4	Artur Gachinski, Sergei Voronov, Mikhail Kolyada, Dmitri Aliev
3	USA	3	Nathan Chen, Vincent Zhou, Ilia Malinin
4	CAN	1	Patrick Chan
4	ESP	1	Javier Fernández
4	CHN	1	Jin Boyang
4	KOR	1	Cha Jun-hwan
4	FRA	1	Adam Siao Him Fa
4	KAZ	1	Mikhail Shaidorov

Total season top 3s by nation (men's)
Rk	Nation	Times as season's			Total	First top 3 season	Latest top 3 season
Rk	Nation	No. 1	No. 2	No. 3	Total	First top 3 season	Latest top 3 season
1	JPN	5	11	7	23	2010–11	2025–26
2	USA	7	1	1	9	2016–17	2025–26
3	CAN	3	0	1	4	2010–11	2013–14
4	RUS	0	2	2	4	2010–11	2019–20
5	ESP	1	1	1	3	2012–13	2015–16
6	KAZ	0	0	2	2	2024–25	2025–26
7	FRA	0	1	0	1	2023–24	2023–24
8	CHN	0	0	1	1	2019–20	2019–20
8	KOR	0	0	1	1	2022–23	2022–23

Total season top 3s by skater (men's)
Rk	Nation	Skater	Times as season's			Total	Season
Rk	Nation	Skater	No. 1	No. 2	No. 3	Total	Season
1	JPN	Yuzuru Hanyu	4	3	2	9	2011–12, 2012–13, 2013–14, 2014–15, 2015–16, 2016–17, 2018–19, 2019–20, 2020–21
2	JPN	Shoma Uno	1	2	3	6	2015–16, 2016–17, 2017–18, 2018–19, 2021–22, 2022–23
3	JPN	Yuma Kagiyama	0	4	1	5	2020–21, 2021–22, 2023–24, 2024–25, 2025–26
4	USA	Ilia Malinin	3	1	0	4	2022–23, 2023–24, 2024–25, 2025–26
5	CAN	Patrick Chan	3	0	1	4	2010–11, 2011–12, 2012–13, 2013–14
5	USA	Nathan Chen	3	0	1	4	2016–17, 2017–18, 2018–19, 2020–21
7	ESP	Javier Fernández	1	1	1	3	2012–13, 2014–15, 2015–16
8	KAZ	Mikhail Shaidorov	0	0	2	2	2024–25, 2025–26
9	USA	Vincent Zhou	1	0	0	1	2021–22
10	JPN	Takahiko Kozuka	0	1	0	1	2010–11
10	JPN	Tatsuki Machida	0	1	0	1	2013–14
10	RUS	Mikhail Kolyada	0	1	0	1	2017–18
10	RUS	Dmitri Aliev	0	1	0	1	2019–20
10	FRA	Adam Siao Him Fa	0	1	0	1	2023–24
15	RUS	Artur Gachinski	0	0	1	1	2010–11
15	JPN	Daisuke Takahashi	0	0	1	1	2011–12
15	RUS	Sergei Voronov	0	0	1	1	2014–15
15	CHN	Jin Boyang	0	0	1	1	2019–20
15	KOR	Cha Jun-hwan	0	0	1	1	2022–23

Consecutive season top 3s by skater (men's)
Rk	Nation	Skater	Number of consecutive seasons as season's			Consecutive seasons^{*}	Season
Rk	Nation	Skater	No. 1	No. 2	No. 3	Consecutive seasons^{*}	Season
1	JPN	Yuzuru Hanyu	3	3	0	6	2011–12, 2012–13, 2013–14, 2014–15, 2015–16, 2016–17
2	USA	Ilia Malinin	3	1	0	**4**	**2022–23, 2023–24, 2024–25, 2025–26**
3	CAN	Patrick Chan	3	0	1	4	2010–11, 2011–12, 2012–13, 2013–14
4	JPN	Shoma Uno	0	2	2	4	2015–16, 2016–17, 2017–18, 2018–19
5	USA	Nathan Chen	2	0	1	3	2016–17, 2017–18, 2018–19
6	JPN	Yuzuru Hanyu	1	0	2	3	2018–19, 2019–20, 2020–21
7	JPN	Yuma Kagiyama	0	2	1	**3**	**2023–24, 2024–25, 2025–26**
8	ESP	Javier Fernández	1	1	0	2	2014–15, 2015–16
9	JPN	Shoma Uno	1	0	1	2	2021–22, 2022–23
10	JPN	Yuma Kagiyama	0	2	0	2	2020–21, 2021–22
11	KAZ	Mikhail Shaidorov	0	0	2	**2**	**2024–25, 2025–26**

Bold = consecutive streak is active

^{*At least 2 seasons in a row as season top 3}

==== Women's singles ====
Updated through 2025–26 season

Chronological

Season's top 3 (women's)
Season	Season's No. 1			Season's No. 2			Season's No. 3			Ref
Season	Nation	Skater	Points	Nation	Skater	Points	Nation	Skater	Points	Ref
2010–11	ITA	Carolina Kostner	2342	JPN	Miki Ando	2125	USA	Alissa Czisny	1987	
2011–12	ITA	Carolina Kostner	2650	JPN	Akiko Suzuki	2092	RUS	Alena Leonova	2088	
2012–13	JPN	Mao Asada	2172	USA	Ashley Wagner	1907	JPN	Akiko Suzuki	1764	
2013–14	RUS	Yulia Lipnitskaya	2450	JPN	Mao Asada	2400	RUS	Adelina Sotnikova	2085	
2014–15	RUS	Elizaveta Tuktamysheva	3000	RUS	Elena Radionova	2092	JPN	Satoko Miyahara	2028	
2015–16	RUS	Evgenia Medvedeva	2700	JPN	Satoko Miyahara	2260	USA	Ashley Wagner	2063	
2016–17	RUS	Evgenia Medvedeva	2400	CAN	Kaetlyn Osmond	2323	RUS	Anna Pogorilaya	2047	
2017–18	RUS	Alina Zagitova	2700	CAN	Kaetlyn Osmond	2548	JPN	Wakaba Higuchi	2432	
2018–19	JPN	Rika Kihira	2625	RUS	Alina Zagitova	2620	JPN	Satoko Miyahara	2131	
2019–20	RUS	Alena Kostornaia	2340	JPN	Rika Kihira	2333	RUS	Anna Shcherbakova	2176	
2020–21	RUS	Anna Shcherbakova	1200	RUS	Elizaveta Tuktamysheva	1080	RUS	Alexandra Trusova	972	
2021–22	RUS	Anna Shcherbakova	2225	USA	Alysa Liu	2126	JPN	Kaori Sakamoto	2117	
2022–23	JPN	Kaori Sakamoto	2645	USA	Isabeau Levito	2505	BEL	Loena Hendrickx	2320	
2023–24	JPN	Kaori Sakamoto	2950	USA	Isabeau Levito	2305	KOR	Kim Chae-yeon	2167	
2024–25	JPN	Kaori Sakamoto	2371	USA	Alysa Liu	2328	USA	Amber Glenn	2287	
2025–26	USA	Alysa Liu	2619	JPN	Mone Chiba	2575	JPN	Kaori Sakamoto	2518	

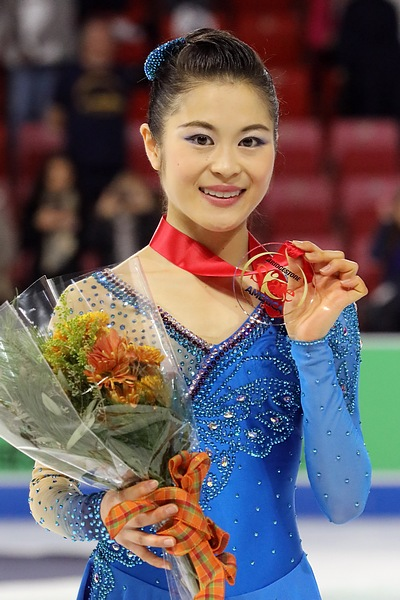
(Japan) Satoko Miyahara

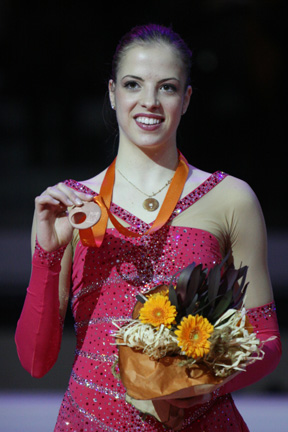
(Italy) Carolina Kostner

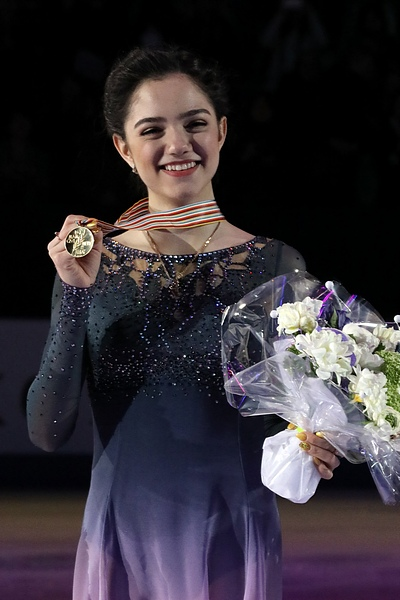
(Russia) Evgenia Medvedeva

The skaters who have been in the season's top 3 the most times (outdated)

Statistics

Total skaters with a season top 3 by nation (women's)
Rk	Nation	Total skaters	Skater
1	RUS	11	Alena Leonova, Yulia Lipnitskaya, Adelina Sotnikova, Elizaveta Tuktamysheva, Elena Radionova, Evgenia Medvedeva, Anna Pogorilaya, Alina Zagitova, Alena Kostornaia, Anna Shcherbakova, Alexandra Trusova
2	JPN	8	Miki Ando, Akiko Suzuki, Mao Asada, Satoko Miyahara, Wakaba Higuchi, Rika Kihira, Kaori Sakamoto, Mone Chiba
3	USA	5	Alissa Czisny, Ashley Wagner, Alysa Liu, Isabeau Levito, Amber Glenn
4	ITA	1	Carolina Kostner
4	CAN	1	Kaetlyn Osmond
4	BEL	1	Loena Hendrickx
4	KOR	1	Kim Chae-yeon

Total season top 3s by nation (women's)
Rk	Nation	Times as season's			Total	First top 3 season	Latest top 3 season
Rk	Nation	No. 1	No. 2	No. 3	Total	First top 3 season	Latest top 3 season
1	JPN	5	6	6	17	2010–11	2025–26
2	RUS	8	3	5	16	2011–12	2021–22
3	USA	1	5	3	9	2010–11	2025–26
4	ITA	2	0	0	2	2010–11	2011–12
5	CAN	0	2	0	2	2016–17	2017–18
6	BEL	0	0	1	1	2022–23	2022–23
6	KOR	0	0	1	1	2023–24	2023–24

Total season top 3s by skater (women's)
Rk	Nation	Skater	Times as season's			Total	Season
Rk	Nation	Skater	No. 1	No. 2	No. 3	Total	Season
1	JPN	Kaori Sakamoto	3	0	2	5	2021–22, 2022–23, 2023–24, 2024–25, 2025–26
2	RUS	Anna Shcherbakova	2	0	1	3	2019–20, 2020–21, 2021–22
3	USA	Alysa Liu	1	2	0	3	2021–22, 2024–25, 2025–26
4	JPN	Satoko Miyahara	0	1	2	3	2014–15, 2015–16, 2018–19
5	ITA	Carolina Kostner	2	0	0	2	2010–11, 2011–12
5	RUS	Evgenia Medvedeva	2	0	0	2	2015–16, 2016–17
7	JPN	Mao Asada	1	1	0	2	2012–13, 2013–14
7	RUS	Elizaveta Tuktamysheva	1	1	0	2	2014–15, 2020–21
7	RUS	Alina Zagitova	1	1	0	2	2017–18, 2018–19
7	JPN	Rika Kihira	1	1	0	2	2018–19, 2019–20
11	CAN	Kaetlyn Osmond	0	2	0	2	2016–17, 2017–18
11	USA	Isabeau Levito	0	2	0	2	2022–23, 2023–24
13	JPN	Akiko Suzuki	0	1	1	2	2011–12, 2012–13
13	USA	Ashley Wagner	0	1	1	2	2012–13, 2015–16
15	RUS	Yulia Lipnitskaya	1	0	0	1	2013–14
15	RUS	Alena Kostornaia	1	0	0	1	2019–20
17	JPN	Miki Ando	0	1	0	1	2013–14
17	RUS	Elena Radionova	0	1	0	1	2014–15
17	JPN	Mone Chiba	0	1	0	1	2025–26
20	USA	Alissa Czisny	0	0	1	1	2010–11
20	RUS	Alena Leonova	0	0	1	1	2011–12
20	RUS	Adelina Sotnikova	0	0	1	1	2013–14
20	RUS	Anna Pogorilaya	0	0	1	1	2016–17
20	JPN	Wakaba Higuchi	0	0	1	1	2017–18
20	RUS	Alexandra Trusova	0	0	1	1	2020–21
20	BEL	Loena Hendrickx	0	0	1	1	2022–23
20	KOR	Kim Chae-yeon	0	0	1	1	2023–24
20	USA	Amber Glenn	0	0	1	1	2024–25

Consecutive season top 3s by skater (women's)
Rk	Nation	Skater	Number of consecutive seasons as season's			Consecutive seasons^{*}	Season
Rk	Nation	Skater	No. 1	No. 2	No. 3	Consecutive seasons^{*}	Season
1	JPN	Kaori Sakamoto	3	0	2	**5**	**2021–22, 2022–23, 2023–24, 2024–25, 2025–26**
2	RUS	Anna Shcherbakova	2	0	1	3	2019–20, 2020–21, 2021–22
3	ITA	Carolina Kostner	2	0	0	2	2010–11, 2011–12
3	RUS	Evgenia Medvedeva	2	0	0	2	2015–16, 2016–17
5	JPN	Mao Asada	1	1	0	2	2012–13, 2013–14
5	RUS	Alina Zagitova	1	1	0	2	2017–18, 2018–19
5	JPN	Rika Kihira	1	1	0	2	2018–19, 2019–20
5	USA	Alysa Liu	1	1	0	**2**	**2024–25, 2025–26**
9	CAN	Kaetlyn Osmond	0	2	0	2	2016–17, 2017–18
9	USA	Isabeau Levito	0	2	0	2	2022–23, 2023–24
11	JPN	Akiko Suzuki	0	1	1	2	2011–12, 2012–13
11	JPN	Satoko Miyahara	0	1	1	2	2014–15, 2015–16

Bold = consecutive streak is active

^{*At least 2 seasons in a row as season top 3}

==== Pairs ====
Updated through 2025–26 season

Chronological

Season's top 3 (pairs)
Season	Season's No. 1			Season's No. 2			Season's No. 3			Ref
Season	Nation	Team	Points	Nation	Team	Points	Nation	Team	Points	Ref
2010–11	GER	Aliona Savchenko / Robin Szolkowy	2400	CHN	Pang Qing / Tong Jian	2092	RUS	Vera Bazarova / Yuri Larionov	1922	
2011–12	RUS	Tatiana Volosozhar / Maxim Trankov	2700	GER	Aliona Savchenko / Robin Szolkowy	2400	JPN	Narumi Takahashi / Mervin Tran	1804	
2012–13	RUS	Tatiana Volosozhar / Maxim Trankov	2650	CAN	Kirsten Moore-Towers / Dylan Moscovitch	2010	CAN	Meagan Duhamel / Eric Radford	1915	
2013–14	RUS	Tatiana Volosozhar / Maxim Trankov	2570	GER	Aliona Savchenko / Robin Szolkowy	2400	CAN	Kirsten Moore-Towers / Dylan Moscovitch	1957	
2014–15	CAN	Meagan Duhamel / Eric Radford	2700	CHN	Sui Wenjing / Han Cong	2088	RUS	Yuko Kavaguti / Alexander Smirnov	2012	
2015–16	RUS	Ksenia Stolbova / Fedor Klimov	2375	CAN	Meagan Duhamel / Eric Radford	2320	USA	Alexa Scimeca / Chris Knierim	2010	
2016–17	RUS	Evgenia Tarasova / Vladimir Morozov	2432	GER	Aliona Savchenko / Bruno Massot	2180	CAN	Meagan Duhamel / Eric Radford	2104	
2017–18	GER	Aliona Savchenko / Bruno Massot	2670	RUS	Evgenia Tarasova / Vladimir Morozov	2305	CAN	Meagan Duhamel / Eric Radford	2290	
2018–19	RUS	Evgenia Tarasova / Vladimir Morozov	2428	FRA	Vanessa James / Morgan Ciprès	2340	RUS	Natalia Zabiiako / Alexander Enbert	2255	
2019–20	CHN	Peng Cheng / Jin Yang	2119	CHN	Sui Wenjing / Han Cong	2040	CAN	Kirsten Moore-Towers / Michael Marinaro	1865	
2020–21	RUS	Anastasia Mishina / Aleksandr Galliamov	1200	CHN	Sui Wenjing / Han Cong	1080	RUS	Aleksandra Boikova / Dmitrii Kozlovskii	972	
2021–22	RUS	Evgenia Tarasova / Vladimir Morozov	2410	USA	Alexa Knierim / Brandon Frazier	2291	RUS	Anastasia Mishina / Aleksandr Galliamov	2072	
2022–23	ITA	Sara Conti / Niccolò Macii	2480	JPN	Riku Miura / Ryuichi Kihara	2400	ITA	Rebecca Ghilardi / Filippo Ambrosini	2251	
2023–24	GER	Minerva Fabienne Hase / Nikita Volodin	2742	CAN	Deanna Stellato-Dudek / Maxime Deschamps	2548	ITA	Sara Conti / Niccolò Macii	2339	
2024–25	JPN	Riku Miura / Ryuichi Kihara	2590	GER	Minerva Fabienne Hase / Nikita Volodin	2580	ITA	Sara Conti / Niccolò Macii	2505	
2025–26	JPN	Riku Miura / Ryuichi Kihara	2970	GER	Minerva Fabienne Hase / Nikita Volodin	2818	GEO	Anastasiia Metelkina / Luka Berulava	2633	

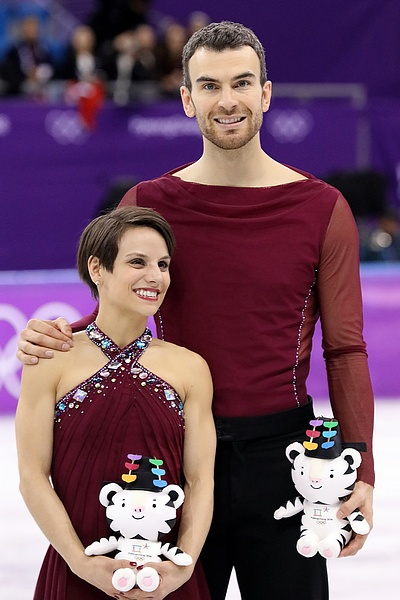
(Canada) Duhamel /
Radford

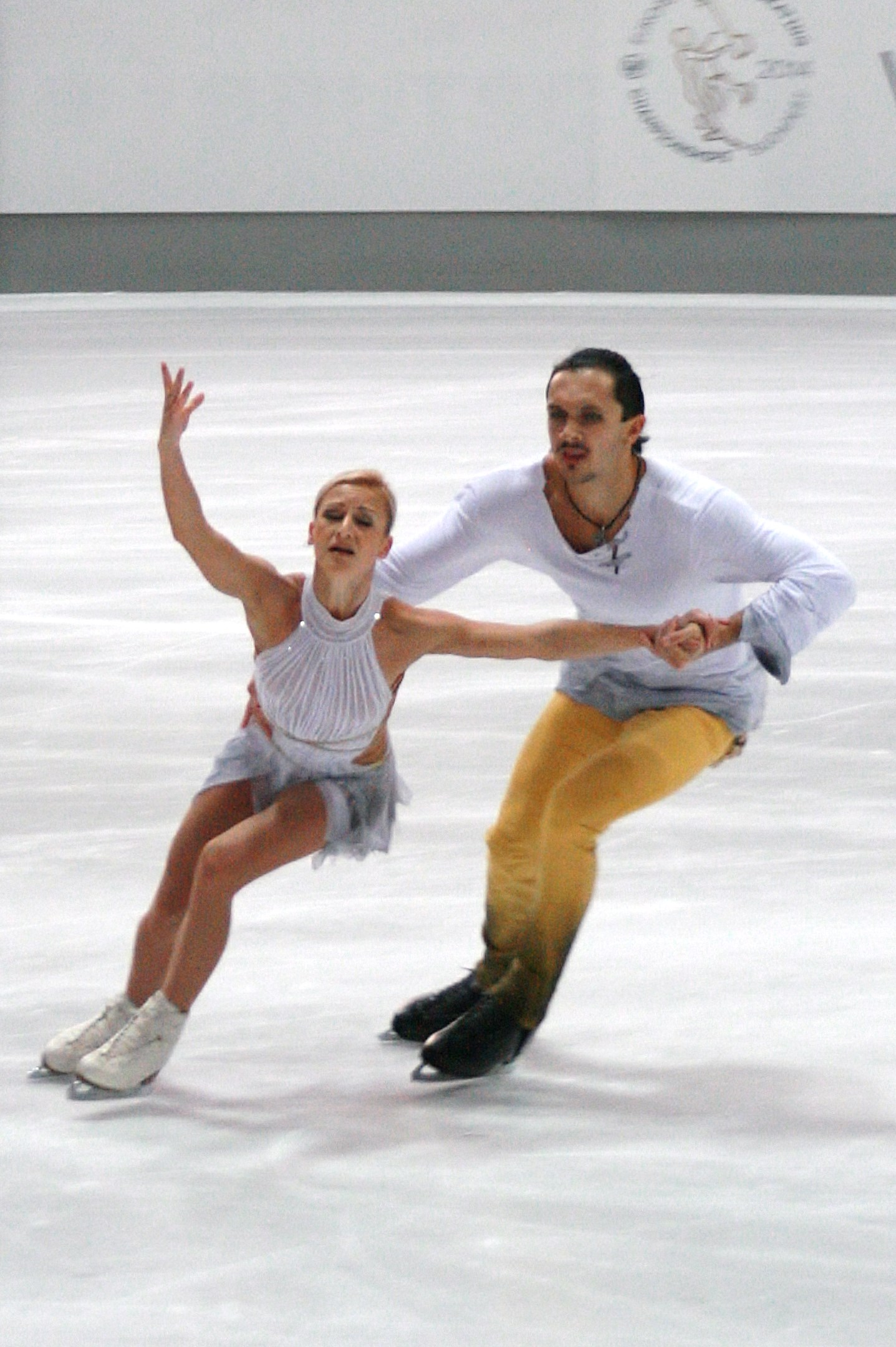
(Russia) Volosozhar /
Trankov

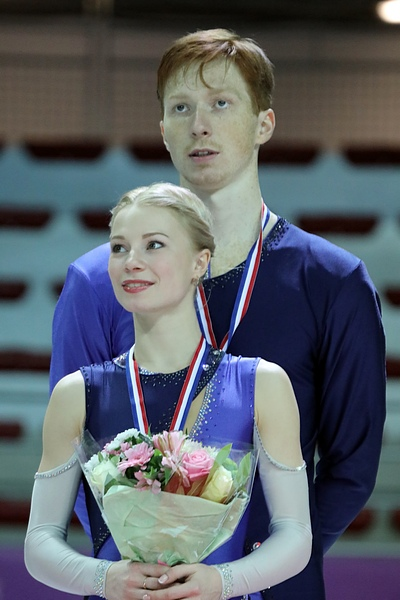
(Russia) Tarasova /
Morozov

The skaters who have been in the season's top 3 the most times (outdated)

Statistics

Total teams with a season top 3 by nation (pairs)
Rk	Nation	Total teams	Team
1	RUS	8	Vera Bazarova / Yuri Larionov, Tatiana Volosozhar / Maxim Trankov, Yuko Kavaguti / Alexander Smirnov, Ksenia Stolbova / Fedor Klimov, Evgenia Tarasova / Vladimir Morozov, Natalia Zabiiako / Alexander Enbert, Anastasia Mishina / Aleksandr Galliamov, Aleksandra Boikova / Dmitrii Kozlovskii
2	CHN	3	Pang Qing / Tong Jian, Sui Wenjing / Han Cong, Peng Cheng / Jin Yang
2	GER	3	Aliona Savchenko / Robin Szolkowy, Aliona Savchenko / Bruno Massot, Minerva Fabienne Hase / Nikita Volodin
2	CAN	3	Kirsten Moore-Towers / Dylan Moscovitch, Meagan Duhamel / Eric Radford, Kirsten Moore-Towers / Michael Marinaro, Deanna Stellato-Dudek / Maxime Deschamps
5	USA	2	Alexa Scimeca / Chris Knierim, Alexa Knierim / Brandon Frazier
5	JPN	2	Narumi Takahashi / Mervin Tran, Riku Miura / Ryuichi Kihara
5	ITA	2	Sara Conti / Niccolò Macii, Rebecca Ghilardi / Filippo Ambrosini
8	FRA	1	Vanessa James / Morgan Ciprès
8	GEO	1	Anastasiia Metelkina / Luka Berulava

Total season top 3s by nation (pairs)
Rk	Nation	Times as season's			Total	First top 3 season	Latest top 3 season
Rk	Nation	No. 1	No. 2	No. 3	Total	First top 3 season	Latest top 3 season
1	RUS	8	1	5	14	2010–11	2021–22
2	CAN	1	3	5	9	2012–13	2023–24
3	GER	3	5	0	8	2010–11	2025–26
4	CHN	1	4	0	5	2010–11	2020–21
5	JPN	2	1	1	4	2011–12	2025–26
6	ITA	1	0	3	4	2022–23	2024–25
7	USA	0	1	1	2	2015–16	2021–22
8	FRA	0	1	0	1	2018–19	2018–19
9	GEO	0	0	1	1	2025–26	2025–26

Total season top 3s by team (pairs)
Rk	Nation	Team	Times as season's			Total	Season
Rk	Nation	Team	No. 1	No. 2	No. 3	Total	Season
1	CAN	Meagan Duhamel / Eric Radford	1	1	3	5	2012–13, 2014–15, 2015–16, 2016–17, 2017–18
2	RUS	Evgenia Tarasova / Vladimir Morozov	3	1	0	4	2016–17, 2017–18, 2018–19, 2021–22
3	RUS	Tatiana Volosozhar / Maxim Trankov	3	0	0	3	2011–12, 2012–13, 2013–14
4	JPN	Riku Miura / Ryuichi Kihara	2	1	0	3	2022–23, 2024–25, 2025–26
5	GER	Aliona Savchenko / Robin Szolkowy	1	2	0	3	2010–11, 2011–12, 2013–14
5	GER	Minerva Fabienne Hase / Nikita Volodin	1	2	0	3	2023–24, 2024–25, 2025–26
7	ITA	Sara Conti / Niccolò Macii	1	0	2	3	2022–23, 2023–24, 2024–25
8	CHN	Sui Wenjing / Han Cong	0	3	0	3	2014–15, 2019–20, 2020–21
9	GER	Aliona Savchenko / Bruno Massot	1	1	0	2	2016–17, 2017–18
10	RUS	Anastasia Mishina / Aleksandr Galliamov	1	0	1	2	2020–21, 2021–22
11	CAN	Kirsten Moore-Towers / Dylan Moscovitch	0	1	1	2	2012–13, 2013–14
12	RUS	Ksenia Stolbova / Fedor Klimov	1	0	0	1	2015–16
12	CHN	Peng Cheng / Jin Yang	1	0	0	1	2019–20
14	CHN	Pang Qing / Tong Jian	0	1	0	1	2010–11
14	FRA	Vanessa James / Morgan Ciprès	0	1	0	1	2018–19
14	USA	Alexa Knierim / Brandon Frazier	0	1	0	1	2021–22
14	CAN	Deanna Stellato-Dudek / Maxime Deschamps	0	1	0	1	2023–24
18	RUS	Vera Bazarova / Yuri Larionov	0	0	1	1	2010–11
18	JPN	Narumi Takahashi / Mervin Tran	0	0	1	1	2011–12
18	RUS	Yuko Kavaguti / Alexander Smirnov	0	0	1	1	2014–15
18	USA	Alexa Scimeca / Chris Knierim	0	0	1	1	2015–16
18	RUS	Natalia Zabiiako / Alexander Enbert	0	0	1	1	2018–19
18	CAN	Kirsten Moore-Towers / Michael Marinaro	0	0	1	1	2019–20
18	RUS	Aleksandra Boikova / Dmitrii Kozlovskii	0	0	1	1	2020–21
18	ITA	Rebecca Ghilardi / Filippo Ambrosini	0	0	1	1	2022–23
18	GEO	Anastasiia Metelkina / Luka Berulava	0	0	1	1	2025–26

Consecutive season top 3s by team (pairs)
Rk	Nation	Team	Number of consecutive seasons as season's			Consecutive seasons^{*}	Season
Rk	Nation	Team	No. 1	No. 2	No. 3	Consecutive seasons^{*}	Season
1	CAN	Meagan Duhamel / Eric Radford	1	1	2	4	2014–15, 2015–16, 2016–17, 2017–18
2	RUS	Tatiana Volosozhar / Maxim Trankov	3	0	0	3	2011–12, 2012–13, 2013–14
3	RUS	Evgenia Tarasova / Vladimir Morozov	2	1	0	3	2016–17, 2017–18, 2018–19
4	GER	Minerva Fabienne Hase / Nikita Volodin	1	2	0	**3**	**2023–24****, 2024–25, 2025–26**
5	ITA	Sara Conti / Niccolò Macii	1	0	2	3	2022–23, 2023–24, 2024–25
6	JPN	Riku Miura / Ryuichi Kihara	2	0	0	**2**	**2024–25, 2025–26**
7	GER	Aliona Savchenko / Robin Szolkowy	1	1	0	2	2010–11, 2011–12
7	GER	Aliona Savchenko / Bruno Massot	1	1	0	2	2016–17, 2017–18
9	RUS	Anastasia Mishina / Aleksandr Galliamov	1	0	1	2	2020–21, 2021–22
10	CAN	Kirsten Moore-Towers / Dylan Moscovitch	0	1	1	2	2012–13, 2013–14
11	CHN	Sui Wenjing / Han Cong	0	2	0	2	2019–20, 2020–21

Bold = consecutive streak is active

^{*At least 2 seasons in a row as season top 3}

==== Ice dance ====
Updated through 2025–26 season

Chronological

Season's top 3 (ice dance)
Season	Season's No. 1			Season's No. 2			Season's No. 3			Ref
Season	Nation	Team	Points	Nation	Team	Points	Nation	Team	Points	Ref
2010–11	FRA	Nathalie Péchalat / Fabian Bourzat	2495	USA	Meryl Davis / Charlie White	2400	USA	Maia Shibutani / Alex Shibutani	1784	
2011–12	CAN	Tessa Virtue / Scott Moir	2570	USA	Meryl Davis / Charlie White	2280	FRA	Nathalie Péchalat / Fabian Bourzat	1980	
2012–13	USA	Meryl Davis / Charlie White	2400	CAN	Tessa Virtue / Scott Moir	2200	RUS	Ekaterina Bobrova / Dmitri Soloviev	2107	
2013–14	USA	Meryl Davis / Charlie White	2650	CAN	Tessa Virtue / Scott Moir	2450	CAN	Kaitlyn Weaver / Andrew Poje	2190	
2014–15	FRA	Gabriella Papadakis / Guillaume Cizeron	2548	CAN	Kaitlyn Weaver / Andrew Poje	2472	USA	Madison Chock / Evan Bates	2470	
2015–16	USA	Madison Chock / Evan Bates	2392	USA	Maia Shibutani / Alex Shibutani	2306	CAN	Kaitlyn Weaver / Andrew Poje	2287	
2016–17	CAN	Tessa Virtue / Scott Moir	2700	RUS	Ekaterina Bobrova / Dmitri Soloviev	2370	FRA	Gabriella Papadakis / Guillaume Cizeron	2200	
2017–18	FRA	Gabriella Papadakis / Guillaume Cizeron	2700	CAN	Tessa Virtue / Scott Moir	2620	USA	Madison Hubbell / Zachary Donohue	2323	
2018–19	USA	Madison Hubbell / Zachary Donohue	2472	RUS	Victoria Sinitsina / Nikita Katsalapov	2460	ITA	Charlène Guignard / Marco Fabbri	2288	
2019–20	USA	Madison Chock / Evan Bates	2520	RUS	Victoria Sinitsina / Nikita Katsalapov	2012	CAN	Piper Gilles / Paul Poirier	1981	
2020–21	RUS	Victoria Sinitsina / Nikita Katsalapov	1200	USA	Madison Hubbell / Zachary Donohue	1080	CAN	Piper Gilles / Paul Poirier	972	
2021–22	FRA	Gabriella Papadakis / Guillaume Cizeron	2300	ITA	Charlène Guignard / Marco Fabbri	2195	USA	Madison Hubbell / Zachary Donohue	2090	
2022–23	ITA	Charlène Guignard / Marco Fabbri	2428	GBR	Lilah Fear / Lewis Gibson	2418	USA	Madison Chock / Evan Bates	2320	
2023–24	GBR	Lilah Fear / Lewis Gibson	2458	USA	Madison Chock / Evan Bates	2400	ITA	Charlène Guignard / Marco Fabbri	2392	
2024–25	GBR	Lilah Fear / Lewis Gibson	2620	USA	Madison Chock / Evan Bates	2400	ITA	Charlène Guignard / Marco Fabbri	2295	
2025–26	GBR	Lilah Fear / Lewis Gibson	2473	FRA	Laurence Fournier Beaudry / Guillaume Cizeron	2320	USA	Madison Chock / Evan Bates	2280	

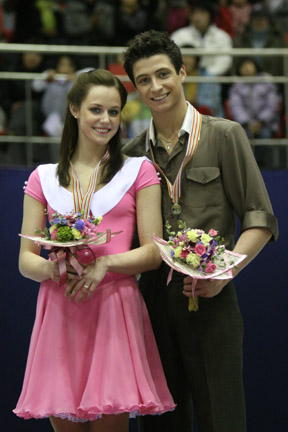
(Canada) Virtue /
Moir

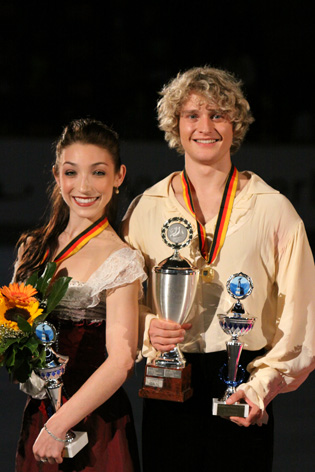
(United States) Davis /
White

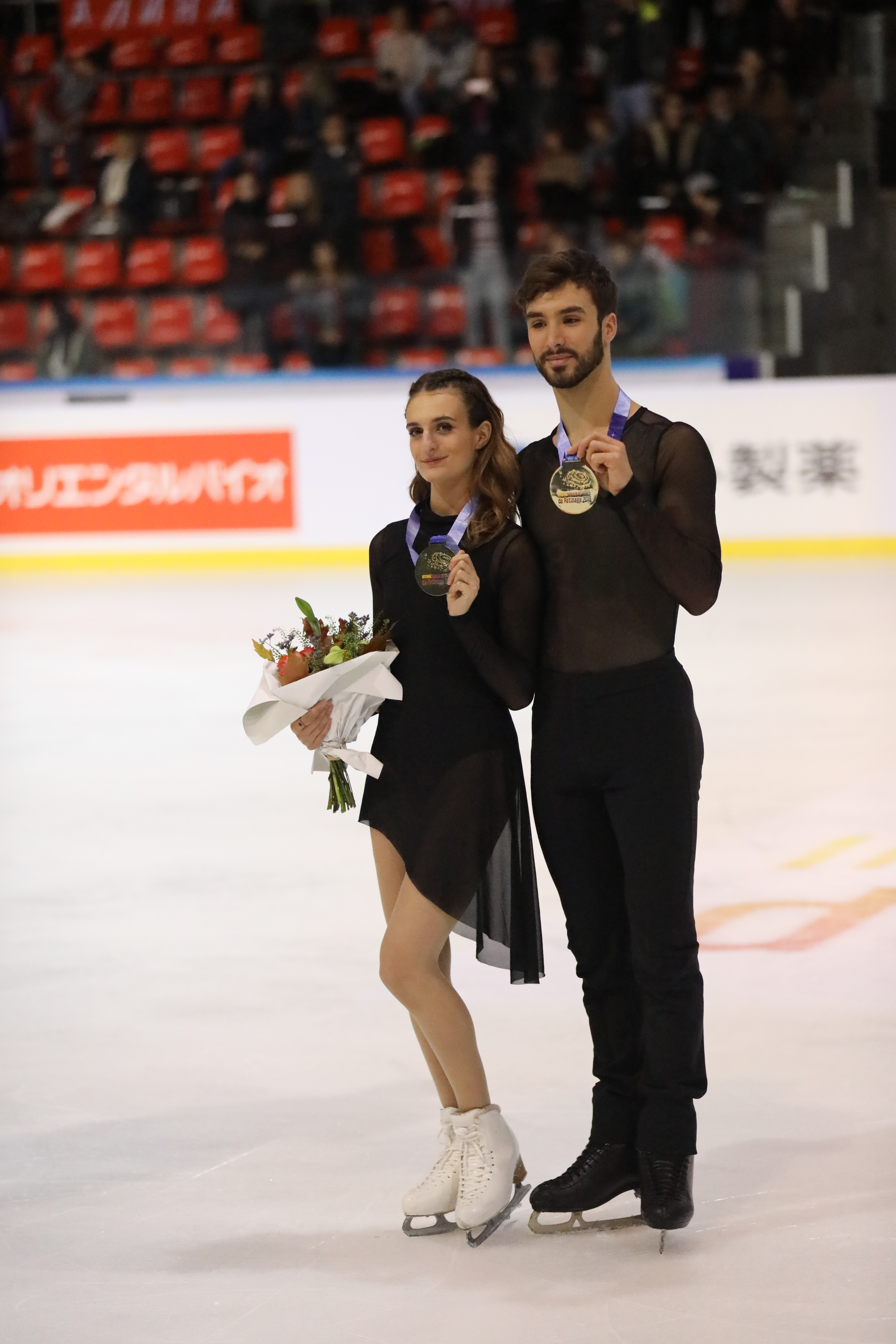
(France) Papadakis /
Cizeron

The skaters who have been in the season's top 3 the most times (outdated)

Statistics

Total teams with a season top 3 by nation (ice dance)
Rk	Nation	Total teams	Team
1	USA	4	Meryl Davis / Charlie White, Maia Shibutani / Alex Shibutani, Madison Chock / Evan Bates, Madison Hubbell / Zachary Donohue
2	CAN	3	Tessa Virtue / Scott Moir, Kaitlyn Weaver / Andrew Poje, Piper Gilles / Paul Poirier
2	FRA	3	Nathalie Péchalat / Fabian Bourzat, Gabriella Papadakis / Guillaume Cizeron, Laurence Fournier Beaudry / Guillaume Cizeron
4	RUS	2	Ekaterina Bobrova / Dmitri Soloviev, Victoria Sinitsina / Nikita Katsalapov
5	ITA	1	Charlène Guignard / Marco Fabbri
5	GBR	1	Lilah Fear / Lewis Gibson

Total season top 3s by nation (ice dance)
Rk	Nation	Times as season's			Total	First top 3 season	Latest top 3 season
Rk	Nation	No. 1	No. 2	No. 3	Total	First top 3 season	Latest top 3 season
1	USA	5	6	6	17	2010–11	2025–26
2	CAN	2	4	4	10	2011–12	2020–21
3	FRA	4	1	2	7	2010–11	2025–26
4	RUS	1	3	1	5	2012–13	2020–21
5	ITA	1	1	3	5	2018–19	2024–25
6	GBR	3	1	0	4	2022–23	2025–26

Total season top 3s by team (ice dance)
Rk	Nation	Team	Times as season's			Total	Season
Rk	Nation	Team	No. 1	No. 2	No. 3	Total	Season
1	USA	Madison Chock / Evan Bates	2	2	3	7	2014–15, 2015–16, 2019–20, 2022–23, 2023–24, 2024–25, 2025–26
2	CAN	Tessa Virtue / Scott Moir	2	3	0	5	2011–12, 2012–13, 2013–14, 2016–17, 2017–18
3	ITA	Charlène Guignard / Marco Fabbri	1	1	3	5	2018–19, 2021–22, 2022–23, 2023–24, 2024–25
4	GBR	Lilah Fear / Lewis Gibson	3	1	0	4	2022–23, 2023–24, 2024–25, 2025–26
5	FRA	Gabriella Papadakis / Guillaume Cizeron	3	0	1	4	2014–15, 2016–17, 2017–18, 2021–22
6	USA	Meryl Davis / Charlie White	2	2	0	4	2010–11, 2011–12, 2012–13, 2013–14
7	USA	Madison Hubbell / Zachary Donohue	1	1	2	4	2017–18, 2018–19, 2020–21, 2021–22
8	RUS	Victoria Sinitsina / Nikita Katsalapov	1	2	0	3	2018–19, 2019–20, 2020–21
9	CAN	Kaitlyn Weaver / Andrew Poje	0	1	2	3	2013–14, 2014–15, 2015–16
10	FRA	Nathalie Péchalat / Fabian Bourzat	1	0	1	2	2010–11, 2011–12
11	USA	Maia Shibutani / Alex Shibutani	0	1	1	2	2010–11, 2015–16
11	RUS	Ekaterina Bobrova / Dmitri Soloviev	0	1	1	2	2012–13, 2016–17
13	CAN	Piper Gilles / Paul Poirier	0	0	2	2	2019–20, 2020–21
14	FRA	Laurence Fournier Beaudry / Guillaume Cizeron	0	1	0	1	2025–26

Consecutive season top 3s by team (ice dance)
Rk	Nation	Team	Number of consecutive seasons as season's			Consecutive seasons^{*}	Season
Rk	Nation	Team	No. 1	No. 2	No. 3	Consecutive seasons^{*}	Season
1	GBR	Lilah Fear / Lewis Gibson	3	1	0	**4**	**2022–23, 2023–24, 2024–25, 2025–26**
2	USA	Meryl Davis / Charlie White	2	2	0	4	2010–11, 2011–12, 2012–13, 2013–14
3	USA	Madison Chock / Evan Bates	0	2	2	**4**	**2022–23, 2023–24, 2024–25, 2025–26**
4	ITA	Charlène Guignard / Marco Fabbri	1	1	2	4	2021–22, 2022–23, 2023–24, 2024–25
5	CAN	Tessa Virtue / Scott Moir	1	2	0	3	2011–12, 2012–13, 2013–14
5	RUS	Victoria Sinitsina / Nikita Katsalapov	1	2	0	3	2018–19, 2019–20, 2020–21
7	CAN	Kaitlyn Weaver / Andrew Poje	0	1	2	3	2013–14, 2014–15, 2015–16
8	CAN	Tessa Virtue / Scott Moir	1	1	0	2	2016–17, 2017–18
9	FRA	Nathalie Péchalat / Fabian Bourzat	1	0	1	2	2010–11, 2011–12
9	USA	Madison Chock / Evan Bates	1	0	1	2	2014–15, 2015–16
9	FRA	Gabriella Papadakis / Guillaume Cizeron	1	0	1	2	2016–17, 2017–18
9	USA	Madison Hubbell / Zachary Donohue	1	0	1	2	2017–18, 2018–19
13	USA	Madison Hubbell / Zachary Donohue	0	1	1	2	2020–21, 2021–22
14	CAN	Piper Gilles / Paul Poirier	0	0	2	2	2019–20, 2020–21

Bold = consecutive streak is active

^{*At least 2 seasons in a row as season top 3}

==== All disciplines ====
Updated through 2025–26 season

Statistics

Combined total skaters/teams with a season top 3 by nation (all disciplines)
Rk	Nation	Number of disciplines	Total skaters/teams with a top 3				
Rk	Nation	Number of disciplines	Men's singles	Women's singles	Pairs	Ice dance	Combined total
1	RUS	4	4	11	8	2	25
2	JPN	3	6	8	2	0	16
3	USA	4	3	5	2	4	14
4	CAN	4	1	1	3	3	8
5	FRA	3	1	0	1	3	5
6	CHN	2	1	0	3	0	4
6	ITA	3	0	1	2	1	4
8	GER	1	0	0	3	0	3
9	KOR	2	1	1	0	0	2
10	ESP	1	1	0	0	0	1
10	BEL	1	0	1	0	0	1
10	GBR	1	0	0	0	1	1
10	KAZ	1	1	0	0	0	1
10	GEO	1	0	0	1	0	1

Combined total season top 3s by nation (all disciplines)
Rk	Nation	Number of disciplines	Total top 3s				
Rk	Nation	Number of disciplines	Men's singles	Women's singles	Pairs	Ice dance	Combined total
1	JPN	3	23	17	4	0	44
2	RUS	4	4	16	14	5	39
3	USA	4	9	9	2	17	37
4	CAN	4	4	2	9	10	25
5	ITA	2	0	2	4	5	11
6	FRA	3	1	0	1	7	9
7	GER	1	0	0	8	0	8
8	CHN	2	1	0	5	0	6
9	GBR	1	0	0	0	4	4
10	ESP	1	3	0	0	0	3
11	KOR	2	1	1	0	0	2
11	KAZ	1	2	0	0	0	2
13	BEL	1	0	1	0	0	1
13	GEO	1	0	0	1	0	1

Total season top 3s by skater/team (all disciplines)
Rk	Nation	Skater/Team	Discipline	Times as season's			Total^{*}	Season
Rk	Nation	Skater/Team	Discipline	No. 1	No. 2	No. 3	Total^{*}	Season
1	JPN	Yuzuru Hanyu	Men's singles	4	3	2	9	2011–12, 2012–13, 2013–14, 2014–15, 2015–16, 2016–17, 2018–19, 2019–20, 2020–21
2	USA	Madison Chock / Evan Bates	Ice dance	2	2	3	7	2014–15, 2015–16, 2019–20, 2022–23, 2023–24, 2024–25, 2025–26
3	JPN	Shoma Uno	Men's singles	1	2	3	6	2015–16, 2016–17, 2017–18, 2018–19, 2021–22, 2022–23
4	JPN	Kaori Sakamoto	Women's singles	3	0	2	5	2021–22, 2022–23, 2023–24, 2024–25, 2025–26
5	CAN	Tessa Virtue / Scott Moir	Ice dance	2	3	0	5	2011–12, 2012–13, 2013–14, 2016–17, 2017–18
6	CAN	Meagan Duhamel / Eric Radford	Pairs	1	1	3	5	2012–13, 2014–15, 2015–16, 2016–17, 2017–18
6	ITA	Charlène Guignard / Marco Fabbri	Ice dance	1	1	3	5	2018–19, 2021–22, 2022–23, 2023–24, 2024–25
8	JPN	Yuma Kagiyama	Men's singles	0	4	1	5	2020–21, 2021–22, 2023–24, 2024–25, 2025–26
9	RUS	Evgenia Tarasova / Vladimir Morozov	Pairs	3	1	0	4	2016–17, 2017–18, 2018–19, 2021–22
9	USA	Ilia Malinin	Men's singles	3	1	0	4	2022–23, 2023–24, 2024–25, 2025–26
9	GBR	Lilah Fear / Lewis Gibson	Ice dance	3	1	0	4	2022–23, 2023–24, 2024–25, 2025–26
12	CAN	Patrick Chan	Men's singles	3	0	1	4	2010–11, 2011–12, 2012–13, 2013–14
12	USA	Nathan Chen	Men's singles	3	0	1	4	2016–17, 2017–18, 2018–19, 2020–21
12	FRA	Gabriella Papadakis / Guillaume Cizeron	Ice dance	3	0	1	4	2014–15, 2016–17, 2017–18, 2021–22
15	USA	Meryl Davis / Charlie White	Ice dance	2	2	0	4	2010–11, 2011–12, 2012–13, 2013–14
16	USA	Madison Hubbell / Zachary Donohue	Ice dance	1	1	2	4	2017–18, 2018–19, 2020–21, 2021–22
17	RUS	Tatiana Volosozhar / Maxim Trankov	Pairs	3	0	0	3	2011–12, 2012–13, 2013–14
18	JPN	Riku Miura / Ryuichi Kihara	Pairs	2	1	0	3	2022–23, 2024–25, 2025–26
19	RUS	Anna Shcherbakova	Women's singles	2	0	1	3	2019–20, 2020–21, 2021–22
20	GER	Aliona Savchenko / Robin Szolkowy	Pairs	1	2	0	3	2010–11, 2011–12, 2013–14
20	RUS	Victoria Sinitsina / Nikita Katsalapov	Ice dance	1	2	0	3	2018–19, 2019–20, 2020–21
20	GER	Minerva Fabienne Hase / Nikita Volodin	Pairs	1	2	0	3	2023–24, 2024–25, 2025–26
20	USA	Alysa Liu	Women's singles	1	2	0	3	2021–22, 2024–25, 2025–26
24	ESP	Javier Fernández	Men's singles	1	1	1	3	2012–13, 2014–15, 2015–16
25	ITA	Sara Conti / Niccolò Macii	Pairs	1	0	2	3	2022–23, 2023–24, 2024–25
26	CHN	Sui Wenjing / Han Cong	Pairs	0	3	0	3	2014–15, 2019–20, 2020–21
27	JPN	Satoko Miyahara	Women's singles	0	1	2	3	2014–15, 2015–16, 2018–19
27	CAN	Kaitlyn Weaver / Andrew Poje	Ice dance	0	1	2	3	2013–14, 2014–15, 2015–16

^{*Minimum 3 seasons as season top 3}

Consecutive season top 3s by skater/team (all disciplines)
Rk	Nation	Skater/Team	Discipline	Number of consecutive seasons as season's			Consecutive seasons^{*}	Season
Rk	Nation	Skater/Team	Discipline	No. 1	No. 2	No. 3	Consecutive seasons^{*}	Season
1	JPN	Yuzuru Hanyu	Men's singles	3	3	0	6	2011–12, 2012–13, 2013–14, 2014–15, 2015–16, 2016–17
2	JPN	Kaori Sakamoto	Women's singles	3	0	2	**5**	**2021–22, 2022–23, 2023–24, 2024–25, 2025–26**
3	USA	Ilia Malinin	Men's singles	3	1	0	**4**	**2022–23, 2023–24, 2024–25, 2025–26**
3	GBR	Lilah Fear / Lewis Gibson	Ice dance	3	1	0	**4**	**2022–23, 2023–24, 2024–25, 2025–26**
5	CAN	Patrick Chan	Men's singles	3	0	1	4	2010–11, 2011–12, 2012–13, 2013–14
6	USA	Meryl Davis / Charlie White	Ice dance	2	2	0	4	2010–11, 2011–12, 2012–13, 2013–14
7	CAN	Meagan Duhamel / Eric Radford	Pairs	1	1	2	4	2014–15, 2015–16, 2016–17, 2017–18
7	ITA	Charlène Guignard / Marco Fabbri	Ice dance	1	1	2	4	2021–22, 2022–23, 2023–24, 2024–25
9	JPN	Shoma Uno	Men's singles	0	2	2	4	2015–16, 2016–17, 2017–18, 2018–19
9	USA	Madison Chock / Evan Bates	Ice dance	0	2	2	**4**	**2022–23, 2023–24, 2024–25, 2025–26**
11	RUS	Tatiana Volosozhar / Maxim Trankov	Pairs	3	0	0	3	2011–12, 2012–13, 2013–14
12	RUS	Evgenia Tarasova / Vladimir Morozov	Pairs	2	1	0	3	2016–17, 2017–18, 2018–19
13	USA	Nathan Chen	Men's singles	2	0	1	3	2016–17, 2017–18, 2018–19
13	RUS	Anna Shcherbakova	Women's singles	2	0	1	3	2019–20, 2020–21, 2021–22
15	CAN	Tessa Virtue / Scott Moir	Ice dance	1	2	0	3	2011–12, 2012–13, 2013–14
15	RUS	Victoria Sinitsina / Nikita Katsalapov	Ice dance	1	2	0	3	2018–19, 2019–20, 2020–21
15	GER	Minerva Fabienne Hase / Nikita Volodin	Pairs	1	2	0	**3**	**2023–24, 2024–25, 2025–26**
18	JPN	Yuzuru Hanyu	Men's singles	1	0	2	3	2018–19, 2019–20, 2020–21
18	ITA	Sara Conti / Niccolò Macii	Pairs	1	0	2	3	2022–23, 2023–24, 2024–25
20	JPN	Yuma Kagiyama	Men's singles	0	2	1	**3**	**2023–24, 2024–25, 2025–26**
21	CAN	Kaitlyn Weaver / Andrew Poje	Ice dance	0	1	2	3	2013–14, 2014–15, 2015–16

Bold = consecutive streak is active

^{*At least 3 seasons in a row as season top 3}

=== Highest scoring seasons ===
Threshold to be considered a high scoring season is 2400 points.

Complete lists, by discipline, of:

- highest personal best season points by skater/team
- top 10 absolute best scoring seasons
- total skaters with 2400+ point PBs by nation
- total 2400+ point PBs by skater

==== Men's singles ====
Updated through 2025–26 season

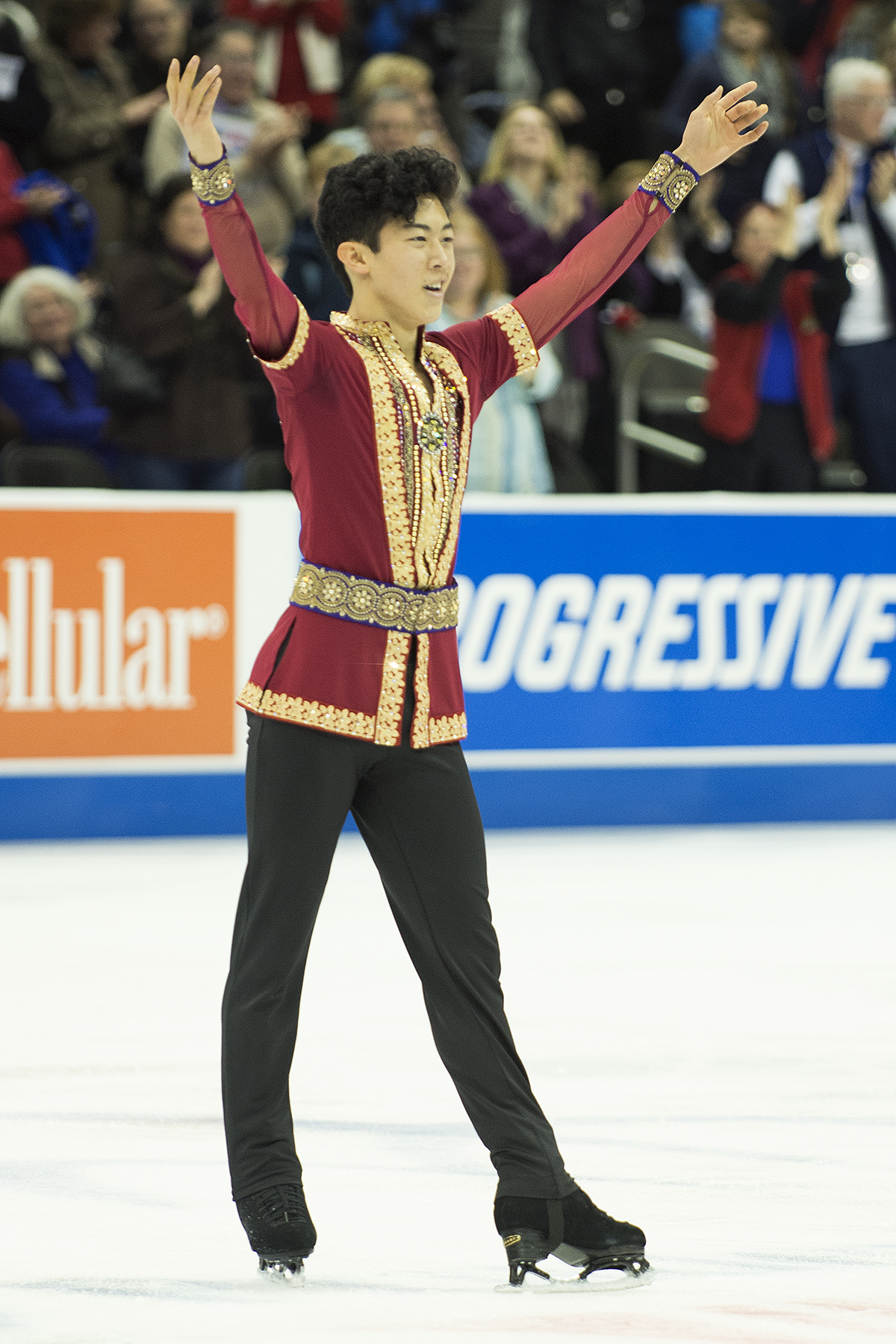
(United States) Nathan Chen

Highest personal best season points by skater (men's)
Rk	Nation	Skater	Points	Season	Date^{*}	Event^{†}	SWR
1	JPN	Yuzuru Hanyu	2700	2016–17	April 1, 2017	2017 WC	No. 1
1	USA	Nathan Chen	2700	2017–18	March 24, 2018	2018 WC	No. 1
1	USA	Ilia Malinin	2700	2023–24	March 23, 2024	2024 WC	No. 1
4	RUS	Mikhail Kolyada	2539	2017–18	March 24, 2018	2018 WC	No. 2
5	FRA	Adam Siao Him Fa	2505	2023–24	March 23, 2024	2024 WC	No. 2
6	JPN	Shoma Uno	2500	2017–18	February 17, 2018	2018 OWG	No. 3
7	JPN	Yuma Kagiyama	2470	2025–26	February 13, 2026	2026 OWG	No. 2
8	CAN	Patrick Chan	2400	2010–11	April 28, 2011	2011 WC	No. 1

^{*}Event date when skater first reached PB point total.

^{†}OWG for Olympic Winter Games, WC for World Championships.

Top 10 absolute best scoring seasons (men's)
Rk	Nation	Skater	Points	Season	Date^{*}	Event^{†}	SWR
1	JPN	Yuzuru Hanyu	2700	2016–17	April 1, 2017	2017 WC	No. 1
1	USA	Nathan Chen	2700	2017–18	March 24, 2018	2018 WC	No. 1
1	USA	Ilia Malinin	2700	2023–24	March 23, 2024	2024 WC	No. 1
1	USA	Ilia Malinin	2700	2024–25	March 29, 2025	2025 WC	No. 1
1	USA	Ilia Malinin	2700	2025–26	March 28, 2026	2026 WC	No. 1
6	JPN	Yuzuru Hanyu	2610	2013–14	February 14, 2014	2014 OWG	No. 1
7	RUS	Mikhail Kolyada	2539	2017–18	March 24, 2018	2018 WC	No. 2
8	JPN	Yuzuru Hanyu	2530	2015–16	April 1, 2016	2016 WC	No. 1
9	FRA	Adam Siao Him Fa	2505	2023–24	March 23, 2024	2024 WC	No. 2
10	JPN	Shoma Uno	2500	2017–18	February 17, 2018	2018 OWG	No. 3

^{*}Event date when skater reached point total.

^{†}OWG for Olympic Winter Games, WC for World Championships.

Total skaters with 2400+ point PBs by nation (men's)
Rk	Nation	Total skaters	Skater
1	JPN	3	Yuzuru Hanyu, Shoma Uno, Yuma Kagiyama
2	USA	2	Nathan Chen, Ilia Malinin
3	CAN	1	Patrick Chan
3	RUS	1	Mikhail Kolyada
3	FRA	1	Adam Siao Him Fa

Total 2400+ point PBs by skater (men's)
Rk	Nation	Skater	Total seasons	Season
1	JPN	Yuzuru Hanyu	3	2013–14, 2015–16, 2016–17
1	JPN	Shoma Uno	3	2016–17, 2017–18, 2022–23
1	USA	Ilia Malinin	3	2023–24, 2024–25, 2025–26
4	CAN	Patrick Chan	2	2010–11, 2011–12
4	USA	Nathan Chen	2	2017–18, 2018–19
4	JPN	Yuma Kagiyama	2	2023–24, 2025–26
7	RUS	Mikhail Kolyada	1	2017–18
7	FRA	Adam Siao Him Fa	1	2023–24

==== Women's singles ====
Updated through 2025–26 season

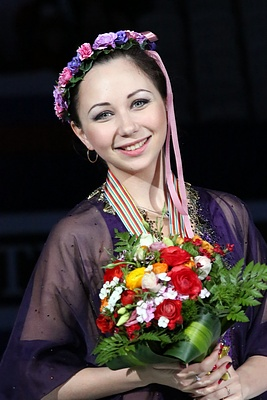
(Russia) Elizaveta Tuktamysheva

Highest personal best season points by skater (women's)
Rk	Nation	Skater	Points	Season	Date^{*}	Event^{†}	SWR
1	RUS	Elizaveta Tuktamysheva	3000	2014–15	March 28, 2015	2015 WC	No. 1
2	JPN	Kaori Sakamoto	2950	2023–24	March 22, 2024	2024 WC	No. 1
3	RUS	Evgenia Medvedeva	2700	2015–16	April 2, 2016	2016 WC	No. 1
3	RUS	Alina Zagitova	2700	2017–18	February 23, 2018	2018 OWG	No. 1
5	ITA	Carolina Kostner	2650	2011–12	March 31, 2012	2012 WC	No. 1
6	JPN	Rika Kihira	2625	2018–19	March 22, 2019	2019 WC	No. 1
7	USA	Alysa Liu	2619	2025–26	February 19, 2026	2026 OWG	No. 1
8	JPN	Mone Chiba	2575	2025–26	March 27, 2026	2026 WC	No. 2
9	CAN	Kaetlyn Osmond	2548	2017–18	March 23, 2018	2018 WC	No. 2
10	USA	Isabeau Levito	2505	2022–23	March 24, 2023	2023 WC	No. 2
11	RUS	Yulia Lipnitskaya	2450	2013–14	March 29, 2014	2014 WC	No. 1
12	JPN	Wakaba Higuchi	2432	2017–18	March 23, 2018	2018 WC	No. 3
13	JPN	Mao Asada	2400	2013–14	March 29, 2014	2014 WC	No. 2

^{*}Event date when skater first reached PB point total.

^{†}OWG for Olympic Winter Games, WC for World Championships.

Top 10 absolute best scoring seasons (women's)
Rk	Nation	Skater	Points	Season	Date^{*}	Event^{†}	SWR
1	RUS	Elizaveta Tuktamysheva	3000	2014–15	March 28, 2015	2015 WC	No. 1
2	JPN	Kaori Sakamoto	2950	2023–24	March 22, 2024	2024 WC	No. 1
3	RUS	Evgenia Medvedeva	2700	2015–16	April 2, 2016	2016 WC	No. 1
3	RUS	Alina Zagitova	2700	2017–18	February 23, 2018	2018 OWG	No. 1
5	ITA	Carolina Kostner	2650	2011–12	March 31, 2012	2012 WC	No. 1
6	JPN	Kaori Sakamoto	2645	2022–23	March 24, 2023	2023 WC	No. 1
7	JPN	Rika Kihira	2625	2018–19	March 22, 2019	2019 WC	No. 1
8	RUS	Alina Zagitova	2620	2018–19	March 22, 2019	2019 WC	No. 2
9	USA	Alysa Liu	2619	2025–26	February 19, 2026	2026 OWG	No. 1
10	JPN	Mone Chiba	2575	2025–26	March 27, 2026	2026 WC	No. 2

^{*}Event date when skater reached point total.

^{†}OWG for Olympic Winter Games, WC for World Championships.

Total skaters with 2400+ point PBs by nation (women's)
Rk	Nation	Total skaters	Skater
1	JPN	5	Mao Asada, Wakaba Higuchi, Rika Kihira, Kaori Sakamoto, Mone Chiba
2	RUS	4	Yulia Lipnitskaya, Elizaveta Tuktamysheva, Evgenia Medvedeva, Alina Zagitova
3	USA	2	Isabeau Levito, Alysa Liu
4	ITA	1	Carolina Kostner
4	CAN	1	Kaetlyn Osmond

Total 2400+ point PBs by skater (women's)
Rk	Nation	Skater	Total seasons	Season
1	JPN	Kaori Sakamoto	3	2022–23, 2023–24, 2025–26
2	RUS	Evgenia Medvedeva	2	2015–16, 2016–17
2	RUS	Alina Zagitova	2	2017–18, 2018–19
4	ITA	Carolina Kostner	1	2011–12
4	RUS	Yulia Lipnitskaya	1	2013–14
4	JPN	Mao Asada	1	2013–14
4	RUS	Elizaveta Tuktamysheva	1	2014–15
4	CAN	Kaetlyn Osmond	1	2017–18
4	JPN	Wakaba Higuchi	1	2017–18
4	JPN	Rika Kihira	1	2018–19
4	USA	Isabeau Levito	1	2022–23
4	USA	Alysa Liu	1	2025–26
4	JPN	Mone Chiba	1	2025–26

==== Pairs ====
Updated through 2025–26 season

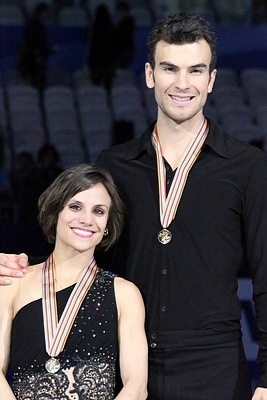
(Canada) Meagan Duhamel / Eric Radford

Highest personal best season points by team (pairs)
Rk	Nation	Team	Points	Season	Date^{*}	Event^{†}	SWR
1	JPN	Riku Miura / Ryuichi Kihara	2970	2025–26	February 16, 2026	2026 OWG	No. 1
2	GER	Minerva Fabienne Hase / Nikita Volodin	2818	2025–26	March 26, 2026	2026 WC	No. 2
3	RUS	Tatiana Volosozhar / Maxim Trankov	2700	2011–12	March 28, 2012	2012 WC	No. 1
3	CAN	Meagan Duhamel / Eric Radford	2700	2014–15	March 26, 2015	2015 WC	No. 1
5	GER	Aliona Savchenko / Bruno Massot	2670	2017–18	February 15, 2018	2018 OWG	No. 1
6	GEO	Anastasiia Metelkina / Luka Berulava	2633	2025–26	February 16, 2026	2026 OWG	No. 3
7	CAN	Deanna Stellato-Dudek / Maxime Deschamps	2548	2023–24	March 21, 2024	2024 WC	No. 2
8	ITA	Sara Conti / Niccolò Macii	2505	2024–25	March 27, 2025	2025 WC	No. 3
9	RUS	Evgenia Tarasova / Vladimir Morozov	2432	2016–17	March 30, 2017	2017 WC	No. 1
10	GER	Aliona Savchenko / Robin Szolkowy	2400	2010–11	April 28, 2011	2011 WC	No. 1

^{*}Event date when team first reached PB point total.

^{†}OWG for Olympic Winter Games, WC for World Championships.

Top 10 absolute best scoring seasons (pairs)
Rk	Nation	Team	Points	Season	Date^{*}	Event^{†}	SWR
1	JPN	Riku Miura / Ryuichi Kihara	2970	2025–26	February 16, 2026	2026 OWG	No. 1
2	GER	Minerva Fabienne Hase / Nikita Volodin	2818	2025–26	March 26, 2026	2026 WC	No. 2
3	GER	Minerva Fabienne Hase / Nikita Volodin	2742	2023–24	March 21, 2024	2024 WC	No. 1
4	RUS	Tatiana Volosozhar / Maxim Trankov	2700	2011–12	March 28, 2012	2012 WC	No. 1
4	CAN	Meagan Duhamel / Eric Radford	2700	2014–15	March 26, 2015	2015 WC	No. 1
6	GER	Aliona Savchenko / Bruno Massot	2670	2017–18	February 15, 2018	2018 OWG	No. 1
7	RUS	Tatiana Volosozhar / Maxim Trankov	2650	2012–13	March 15, 2013	2013 WC	No. 1
8	GEO	Anastasiia Metelkina / Luka Berulava	2633	2025–26	February 16, 2026	2026 OWG	No. 3
9	JPN	Riku Miura / Ryuichi Kihara	2590	2024–25	March 27, 2025	2025 WC	No. 1
10	GER	Minerva Fabienne Hase / Nikita Volodin	2580	2024–25	March 27, 2025	2025 WC	No. 2

^{*}Event date when team reached point total.

^{†}OWG for Olympic Winter Games, WC for World Championships.

Total teams with 2400+ point PBs by nation (pairs)
Rk	Nation	Total teams	Team
1	GER	3	Aliona Savchenko / Robin Szolkowy, Aliona Savchenko / Bruno Massot, Minerva Fabienne Hase / Nikita Volodin
2	RUS	2	Tatiana Volosozhar / Maxim Trankov, Evgenia Tarasova / Vladimir Morozov
2	CAN	2	Meagan Duhamel / Eric Radford, Deanna Stellato-Dudek / Maxime Deschamps
4	ITA	1	Sara Conti / Niccolò Macii
4	JPN	1	Riku Miura / Ryuichi Kihara
4	GEO	1	Anastasiia Metelkina / Luka Berulava

Total 2400+ point PBs by team (pairs)
Rk	Nation	Team	Total seasons	Season
1	RUS	Tatiana Volosozhar / Maxim Trankov	3	2011–12, 2012–13, 2013–14
1	GER	Aliona Savchenko / Robin Szolkowy	3	2010–11, 2011–12, 2013–14
1	RUS	Evgenia Tarasova / Vladimir Morozov	3	2016–17, 2018–19, 2021–22
1	JPN	Riku Miura / Ryuichi Kihara	3	2022–23, 2024–25, 2025–26
1	GER	Minerva Fabienne Hase / Nikita Volodin	3	2023–24, 2024–25, 2025–26
6	ITA	Sara Conti / Niccolò Macii	2	2022–23, 2024–25
6	GEO	Anastasiia Metelkina / Luka Berulava	2	2024–25, 2025–26
8	CAN	Meagan Duhamel / Eric Radford	1	2014–15
8	GER	Aliona Savchenko / Bruno Massot	1	2017–18
8	CAN	Deanna Stellato-Dudek / Maxime Deschamps	1	2023–24

==== Ice dance ====
Updated through 2025–26 season

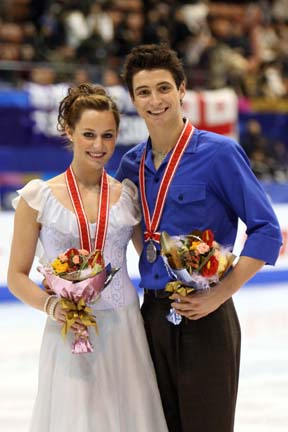
(Canada) Tessa Virtue / Scott Moir

Highest personal best season points by team (ice dance)
Rk	Nation	Team	Points	Season	Date^{*}	Event^{†}	SWR
1	CAN	Tessa Virtue / Scott Moir	2700	2016–17	April 1, 2017	2017 WC	No. 1
1	FRA	Gabriella Papadakis / Guillaume Cizeron	2700	2017–18	March 24, 2018	2018 WC	No. 1
3	USA	Meryl Davis / Charlie White	2650	2013–14	February 17, 2014	2014 OWG	No. 1
4	GBR	Lilah Fear / Lewis Gibson	2620	2024–25	March 29, 2025	2025 WC	No. 1
5	USA	Madison Chock / Evan Bates	2520	2019–20	February 7, 2020	2020 4CC	No. 1
6	FRA	Nathalie Péchalat / Fabian Bourzat	2495	2010–11	April 30, 2011	2011 WC	No. 1
7	CAN	Kaitlyn Weaver / Andrew Poje	2472	2014–15	March 27, 2015	2015 WC	No. 2
7	USA	Madison Hubbell / Zachary Donohue	2472	2018–19	March 23, 2019	2019 WC	No. 1
9	RUS	Victoria Sinitsina / Nikita Katsalapov	2460	2018–19	March 23, 2019	2019 WC	No. 2
10	ITA	Charlène Guignard / Marco Fabbri	2428	2022–23	March 25, 2023	2023 WC	No. 1

^{*}Event date when team first reached PB point total.

^{†}OWG for Olympic Winter Games, WC for World Championships, 4CC for Four Continents Championships.

Top 10 absolute best scoring seasons (ice dance)
Rk	Nation	Team	Points	Season	Date^{*}	Event^{†}	SWR
1	CAN	Tessa Virtue / Scott Moir	2700	2016–17	April 1, 2017	2017 WC	No. 1
1	FRA	Gabriella Papadakis / Guillaume Cizeron	2700	2017–18	March 24, 2018	2018 WC	No. 1
3	USA	Meryl Davis / Charlie White	2650	2013–14	February 17, 2014	2014 OWG	No. 1
4	CAN	Tessa Virtue / Scott Moir	2620	2017–18	February 20, 2018	2018 OWG	No. 2
4	GBR	Lilah Fear / Lewis Gibson	2620	2024–25	March 29, 2025	2025 WC	No. 1
6	CAN	Tessa Virtue / Scott Moir	2570	2011–12	March 29, 2012	2012 WC	No. 1
7	FRA	Gabriella Papadakis / Guillaume Cizeron	2548	2014–15	March 27, 2015	2015 WC	No. 1
8	USA	Madison Chock / Evan Bates	2520	2019–20	February 7, 2020	2020 4CC	No. 1
9	FRA	Nathalie Péchalat / Fabian Bourzat	2495	2010–11	April 30, 2011	2011 WC	No. 1
10	GBR	Lilah Fear / Lewis Gibson	2473	2025–26	March 28, 2026	2026 WC	No. 1

^{*}Event date when team reached point total.

^{†}OWG for Olympic Winter Games, WC for World Championships, 4CC for Four Continents Championships.

Total teams with 2400+ point PBs by nation ( ice dance)
Rk	Nation	Total teams	Team
1	USA	3	Meryl Davis / Charlie White, Madison Chock / Evan Bates, Madison Hubbell / Zachary Donohue
2	FRA	2	Nathalie Péchalat / Fabian Bourzat, Gabriella Papadakis / Guillaume Cizeron
2	CAN	2	Tessa Virtue / Scott Moir, Kaitlyn Weaver / Andrew Poje
4	RUS	1	Victoria Sinitsina / Nikita Katsalapov
4	ITA	1	Charlène Guignard / Marco Fabbri
4	GBR	1	Lilah Fear / Lewis Gibson

Total 2400+ point PBs by team (ice dance)
Rk	Nation	Team	Total seasons	Season
1	CAN	Tessa Virtue / Scott Moir	4	2011–12, 2013–14, 2016–17, 2017–18
1	USA	Madison Chock / Evan Bates	4	2014–15, 2019–20, 2023–24, 2024–25
1	GBR	Lilah Fear / Lewis Gibson	4	2022–23, 2023–24, 2024–25, 2025–26
4	USA	Meryl Davis / Charlie White	3	2010–11, 2012–13, 2013–14
5	FRA	Gabriella Papadakis / Guillaume Cizeron	2	2014–15, 2017–18
6	FRA	Nathalie Péchalat / Fabian Bourzat	1	2010–11
6	CAN	Kaitlyn Weaver / Andrew Poje	1	2014–15
6	USA	Madison Hubbell / Zachary Donohue	1	2018–19
6	RUS	Victoria Sinitsina / Nikita Katsalapov	1	2018–19
6	ITA	Charlène Guignard / Marco Fabbri	1	2022–23

==== All disciplines ====
Updated through 2025–26 season

Highest personal best season points by skater/team (all disciplines)
Rk	Nation	Skater/Team	Discipline	Points	Season	Date^{*}	Event^{†}	SWR
1	RUS	Elizaveta Tuktamysheva	Women's singles	3000	2014–15	March 28, 2015	2015 WC	No. 1
2	JPN	Riku Miura / Ryuichi Kihara	Pairs	2970	2025–26	February 16, 2026	2026 OWG	No. 1
3	JPN	Kaori Sakamoto	Women's singles	2950	2023–24	March 22, 2024	2024 WC	No. 1
4	GER	Minerva Fabienne Hase / Nikita Volodin	Pairs	2818	2025–26	March 26, 2026	2026 WC	No. 2
5	RUS	Tatiana Volosozhar / Maxim Trankov	Pairs	2700	2011–12	March 28, 2012	2012 WC	No. 1
5	CAN	Meagan Duhamel / Eric Radford	Pairs	2700	2014–15	March 26, 2015	2015 WC	No. 1
5	RUS	Evgenia Medvedeva	Women's singles	2700	2015–16	April 2, 2016	2016 WC	No. 1
5	JPN	Yuzuru Hanyu	Men's singles	2700	2016–17	April 1, 2017	2017 WC	No. 1
5	CAN	Tessa Virtue / Scott Moir	Ice dance	2700	2016–17	April 1, 2017	2017 WC	No. 1
5	RUS	Alina Zagitova	Women's singles	2700	2017–18	February 23, 2018	2018 OWG	No. 1
5	USA	Nathan Chen	Men's singles	2700	2017–18	March 24, 2018	2018 WC	No. 1
5	FRA	Gabriella Papadakis / Guillaume Cizeron	Ice dance	2700	2017–18	March 24, 2018	2018 WC	No. 1
5	USA	Ilia Malinin	Men's singles	2700	2023–24	March 23, 2024	2024 WC	No. 1
14	GER	Aliona Savchenko / Bruno Massot	Pairs	2670	2017–18	February 15, 2018	2018 OWG	No. 1
15	ITA	Carolina Kostner	Women's singles	2650	2011–12	March 31, 2012	2012 WC	No. 1
15	USA	Meryl Davis / Charlie White	Ice dance	2650	2013–14	February 17, 2014	2014 OWG	No. 1
17	GEO	Anastasiia Metelkina / Luka Berulava	Pairs	2633	2025–26	February 16, 2026	2026 OWG	No. 3
18	JPN	Rika Kihira	Women's singles	2625	2018–19	March 22, 2019	2019 WC	No. 1
19	GBR	Lilah Fear / Lewis Gibson	Ice dance	2620	2024–25	March 29, 2025	2025 WC	No. 1
20	USA	Alysa Liu	Women's singles	2619	2025–26	February 19, 2026	2026 OWG	No. 1
21	JPN	Mone Chiba	Women's singles	2575	2025–26	March 27, 2026	2026 WC	No. 2
22	CAN	Kaetlyn Osmond	Women's singles	2548	2017–18	March 23, 2018	2018 WC	No. 2
22	CAN	Deanna Stellato-Dudek / Maxime Deschamps	Pairs	2548	2023–24	March 21, 2024	2024 WC	No. 2
24	RUS	Mikhail Kolyada	Men's singles	2539	2017–18	March 24, 2018	2018 WC	No. 2
25	USA	Madison Chock / Evan Bates	Ice dance	2520	2019–20	February 7, 2020	2020 4CC	No. 1
26	USA	Isabeau Levito	Women's singles	2505	2022–23	March 24, 2023	2023 WC	No. 2
26	FRA	Adam Siao Him Fa	Men's singles	2505	2023–24	March 23, 2024	2024 WC	No. 2
26	ITA	Sara Conti / Niccolò Macii	Pairs	2505	2024–25	March 27, 2025	2025 WC	No. 3
29	JPN	Shoma Uno	Men's singles	2500	2017–18	February 17, 2018	2018 OWG	No. 3
30	FRA	Nathalie Péchalat / Fabian Bourzat	Ice dance	2495	2010–11	April 30, 2011	2011 WC	No. 1
31	CAN	Kaitlyn Weaver / Andrew Poje	Ice dance	2472	2014–15	March 27, 2015	2015 WC	No. 2
31	USA	Madison Hubbell / Zachary Donohue	Ice dance	2472	2018–19	March 23, 2019	2019 WC	No. 1
33	JPN	Yuma Kagiyama	Men's singles	2470	2025–26	February 13, 2026	2026 OWG	No. 2
34	RUS	Victoria Sinitsina / Nikita Katsalapov	Ice dance	2460	2018–19	March 23, 2019	2019 WC	No. 2
35	RUS	Yulia Lipnitskaya	Women's singles	2450	2013–14	March 29, 2014	2014 WC	No. 1
36	RUS	Evgenia Tarasova / Vladimir Morozov	Pairs	2432	2016–17	March 30, 2017	2017 WC	No. 1
36	JPN	Wakaba Higuchi	Women's singles	2432	2017–18	March 23, 2018	2018 WC	No. 3
38	ITA	Charlène Guignard / Marco Fabbri	Ice dance	2428	2022–23	March 25, 2023	2023 WC	No. 1
39	CAN	Patrick Chan	Men's singles	2400	2010–11	April 28, 2011	2011 WC	No. 1
39	GER	Aliona Savchenko / Robin Szolkowy	Pairs	2400	2010–11	April 28, 2011	2011 WC	No. 1
39	JPN	Mao Asada	Women's singles	2400	2013–14	March 29, 2014	2014 WC	No. 2

^{*}Event date when skater/team first reached PB point total.

^{†}OWG for Olympic Winter Games, WC for World Championships, 4CC for Four Continents Championships.

Combined total skaters/team with 2400+ point PBs by nation (all disciplines)
Rk	Nation	Number of disciplines	Total 2400+ point PB skaters/teams				
Rk	Nation	Number of disciplines	Men's singles	Women's singles	Pairs	Ice dance	Combined total
1	JPN	3	3	5	1	0	9
2	RUS	4	1	4	2	1	8
3	USA	3	2	2	0	3	7
4	CAN	4	1	1	2	2	6
5	FRA	2	1	0	0	2	3
5	ITA	3	0	1	1	1	3
5	GER	1	0	0	3	0	3
8	GBR	1	0	0	0	1	1
8	GEO	1	0	0	1	0	1
