= Grand Slam (figure skating) =

Figure skating unofficial title

Figure skating records and statistics

Medal records
- Olympic Games; World Championships; European Championships; Four Continents Championships; Grand Prix of Figure Skating; Other events
- Grand Slam; Junior Grand Slam; Golden Slam; Junior Golden Slam; Super Slam

Highest scores statistics
- Current senior; Current junior; Historical senior; Historical junior

Rankings (current and statistics)
- World Standings; Season's World Ranking

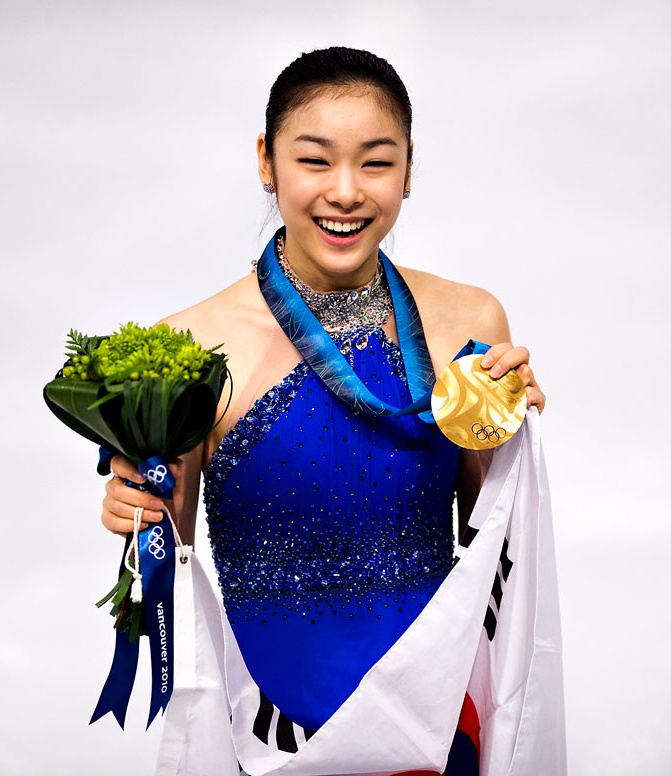
Yuna Kim of South Korea is the first figure skater to achieve a Career Super Grand Slam by winning all the current major junior-level and senior-level international competitions.

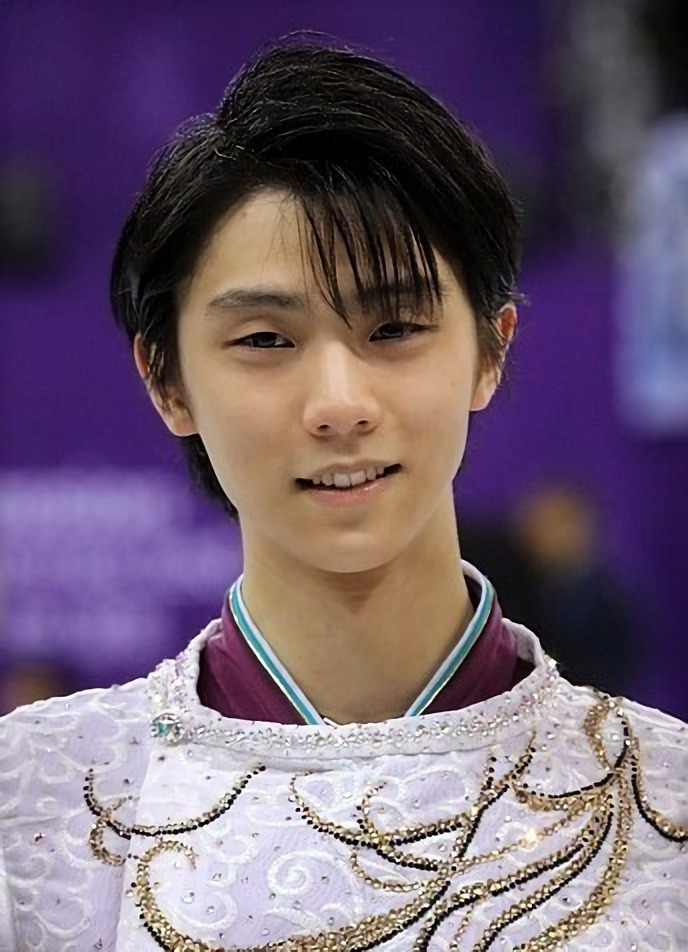
Yuzuru Hanyu of Japan is the only men's single skater who has ever completed the Career Super Grand Slam.

Grand Slam (GS) is a term used in figure skating for the winning all three major annual senior-level international competitions (World Championships, Grand Prix Final, and European Championships or Four Continents Championships) within a single season within one of the four disciplines: men's singles, women's singles, pairs, and ice dance. Winning all three major annual senior-level international competitions at any point during the course of a career is called a "Career Grand Slam". In pair skating and ice dancing, one team may accomplish a Career Grand Slam skating together or one skater may achieve it with different partners.

Winning the gold medal at the Olympic Games in addition to the three major annual senior-level international competitions in a single season is called a "Golden Grand Slam" or "Golden Slam". A skater who wins all three major annual senior-level international competitions and the Olympic gold medal during his or her career is said to have achieved a "Career Golden Grand Slam" or "Career Golden Slam".

Winning all major international competitions at both junior level (World Junior Championships, Junior Grand Prix Final) and senior level (Olympic Games, World Championships, Grand Prix of Figure Skating Final, and either European Championships or Four Continents Championships) at any point during the course of a career is called a "Career Super Grand Slam" or "Super Slam". The Youth Olympic Games is not yet considered, having only begun in 2012.

== History ==
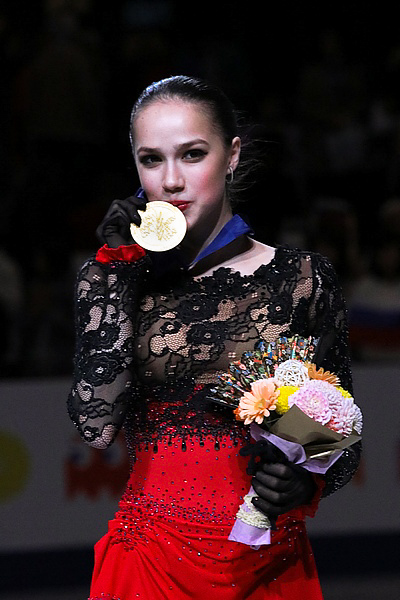
Alina Zagitova is the youngest figure skater to achieve a Super Slam by winning all the major junior-level and senior-level competitions, including the Olympics.

The first World Figure Skating Championships ("WC") was held in 1896. The Grand Prix of Figure Skating Final ("GPF", formerly Champions Series Final) was inaugurated in 1995. The European Figure Skating Championships ("EC"), open to skaters from European countries, first took place in 1891. The International Skating Union (ISU) established the Four Continents Figure Skating Championships ("4CC") in 1999 to provide skaters representing non-European countries. So the possibility of being the reigning champion of all three major annual senior-level international competitions (WC, GPF, and EC or 4CC) did not exist until the 1995–96 season.

Figure skating was first contested in the Olympic Games ("OG") in 1908. The first World Junior Figure Skating Championships ("JWC") were held in 1976. The Junior Grand Prix Final ("JGPF", formerly ISU Junior Series Final) was established in the 1997–98 season. So the possibility of being the super reigning champion of both major junior-level international competitions (JWC and JGPF) and all four major senior-level international competitions (OG, WC, GPF, and EC or 4CC) did not exist until the 1997–98 season.

On 29 June 2011, a report by CNN used the term Grand Slam to figure skating to describe the achievement of winning the Grand Prix Final, the Four Continents Championships, and the World Championships. On 1 April 2012, in a news report on the women's event of the 2012 World Figure Skating Championships by Sina Sports in the Chinese language, the term Grand Slam (大满贯) was used to describe the winning of the Grand Prix Final, the European Championships, and the World Championships. On 11 December 2016, a news report by Sina Sports on the ice dance event of the 2016–17 Grand Prix of Figure Skating Final in the Chinese language used the term Super Slam (超级大满贯) to describe the achievement of winning the World Junior Championships, the Junior Grand Prix Final, the Four Continents Championships, the World Championships, the Grand Prix Final, and the Olympic Games.

On 9 February 2020, a report by the International Skating Union (ISU) used the term Golden Slam to describe the achievement of winning all four major senior-level international competitions (Winter Olympics, World Championships, Grand Prix Final, and Four Continents Championships). On the same day, a report by the Olympic Channel, which is operated by the International Olympic Committee (IOC), used the term Super Slam to figure skating to describe the achievement of winning all major international competitions at both junior level (World Junior Championships, Junior Grand Prix Final) and senior level (Olympic Games, World Championships, Grand Prix of Figure Skating Final, and either European Championships or Four Continents Championships)

== Grand Slam ==
The remainder of this section is a complete list, by discipline, of all skaters who have completed the Grand Slam ordered chronologically, the numbers of Grand Slams by nation, and the first (or youngest/oldest) skater who achieved the Grand Slam.

=== Men's singles ===
Chronological

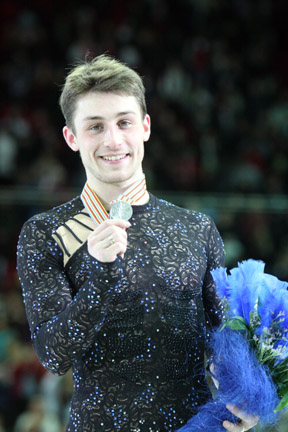
(France) Brian Joubert

Four men's single skaters have completed the Grand Slam. Of these skaters, two have accomplished the feat twice: Alexei Yagudin and Evgeni Plushenko.

#	Season	Skater	Nation
1	1998–99	Alexei Yagudin	RUS
2	2000–01	Evgeni Plushenko	RUS
3	2001–02	Alexei Yagudin	RUS
4	2002–03	Evgeni Plushenko	RUS
5	2006–07	Brian Joubert	FRA
6	2011–12	Patrick Chan	CAN

Totals by nation

The following table shows the numbers of Grand Slams by nation.

#	Nation	Grand Slams
1	RUS	4
2	CAN	1
2	FRA	1

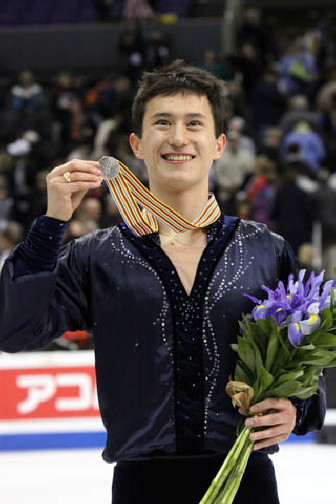
(Canada) Patrick Chan

=== Women's singles ===
Chronological

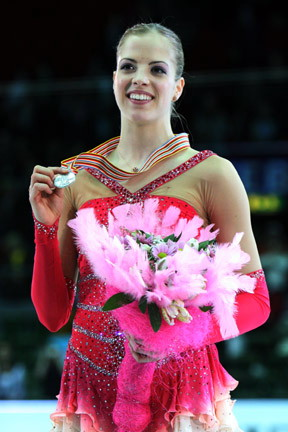
(Italy) Carolina Kostner

Four women's single skaters have completed the Grand Slam. Of these skaters, only one (Evgenia Medvedeva) has accomplished the feat twice. She remains the only skater to ever complete two Grand Slams in a row, the only skater to win a Grand Slam during her first season as a senior, and the only skater to win two Grand Slams during her two first seasons as a senior.

#	Season	Skater	Nation
1	2004–05	Irina Slutskaya	RUS
2	2011–12	Carolina Kostner	ITA
3	2014–15	Elizaveta Tuktamysheva	RUS
4	2015–16	Evgenia Medvedeva	RUS
5	2016–17	Evgenia Medvedeva	RUS

Totals by nation

The following table shows the numbers of Grand Slams by nation.

#	Nation	Grand Slams
1	RUS	4
2	ITA	1

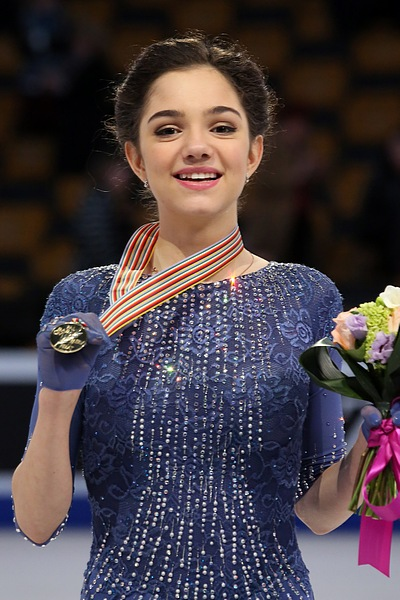
(Russia) Evgenia Medvedeva

=== Pairs ===
Chronological

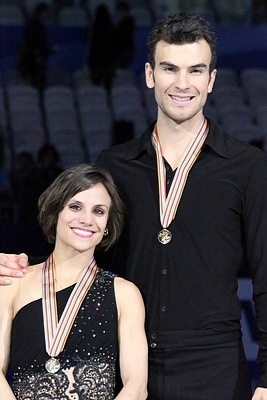
(Canada) Meagan Duhamel / Eric Radford

Seven pair teams have completed the Grand Slam. German couple of Aliona Savchenko and Robin Szolkowy is the only one pair team who has accomplished the feat twice.

#	Season	Couple	Nation
1	1997–98	Elena Berezhnaya / Anton Sikharulidze	RUS
2	2000–01	Jamie Salé / David Pelletier	CAN
3	2006–07	Shen Xue / Zhao Hongbo	CHN
4	2007–08	Aliona Savchenko / Robin Szolkowy	GER
5	2010–11	Aliona Savchenko / Robin Szolkowy	GER
6	2012–13	Tatiana Volosozhar / Maxim Trankov	RUS
7	2014–15	Meagan Duhamel / Eric Radford	CAN
8	2022–23	Riku Miura / Ryuichi Kihara	JPN

Totals by nation

The following table shows the numbers of Grand Slams by nation.

#	Nation	Grand Slams
1	CAN	2
1	GER	2
1	RUS	2
4	CHN	1
4	JPN	1

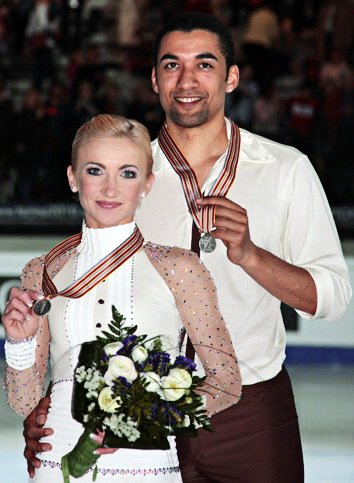
(Germany) Aliona Savchenko / Robin Szolkowy

=== Ice dance ===
Chronological

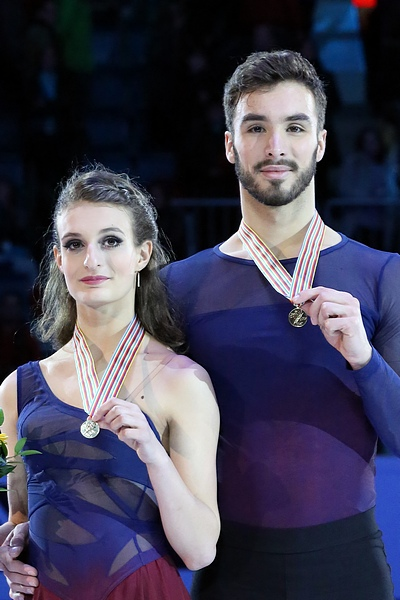
(France) Gabriella Papadakis / Guillaume Cizeron

Eight ice dance teams have completed the Grand Slam. One Russian couple (Tatiana Navka / Roman Kostomarov) and one American couple (Meryl Davis / Charlie White) are the only two ice dance teams who have accomplished the feat twice.

#	Season	Couple	Nation
1	1995–96	Oksana Grishuk / Evgeni Platov	RUS
2	1998–99	Anjelika Krylova / Oleg Ovsyannikov	RUS
3	1999–00	Marina Anissina / Gwendal Peizerat	FRA
4	2000–01	Barbara Fusar-Poli / Maurizio Margaglio	ITA
5	2003–04	Tatiana Navka / Roman Kostomarov	RUS
6	2004–05	Tatiana Navka / Roman Kostomarov	RUS
7	2010–11	Meryl Davis / Charlie White	USA
8	2012–13	Meryl Davis / Charlie White	USA
9	2016–17	Tessa Virtue / Scott Moir	CAN
10	2017–18	Gabriella Papadakis / Guillaume Cizeron	FRA

Totals by nation

The following table shows the numbers of Grand Slams by nation.

#	Nation	Grand Slams
1	RUS	4
2	FRA	2
2	USA	2
4	CAN	1
4	ITA	1

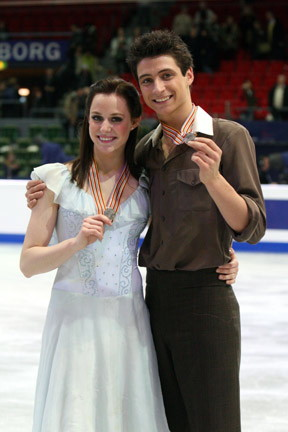
(Canada) Tessa Virtue / Scott Moir

=== All disciplines ===
Chronological

To date, eight single skaters and fifteen couples have completed the Grand Slam. Of these skaters, three single skaters and three couples have accomplished the feat twice.

#	Season	Skater	Nation	Discipline
1	1995–96	Oksana Grishuk / Evgeni Platov	RUS	Ice dance
2	1997–98	Elena Berezhnaya / Anton Sikharulidze	RUS	Pairs
3	1998–99	Alexei Yagudin	RUS	Men's singles
4	1998–99	Anjelika Krylova / Oleg Ovsyannikov	RUS	Ice dance
5	1999–00	Marina Anissina / Gwendal Peizerat	FRA	Ice dance
6	2000–01	Evgeni Plushenko	RUS	Men's singles
7	2000–01	Jamie Salé / David Pelletier	CAN	Pairs
8	2000–01	Barbara Fusar-Poli / Maurizio Margaglio	ITA	Ice dance
9	2001–02	Alexei Yagudin	RUS	Men's singles
10	2002–03	Evgeni Plushenko	RUS	Men's singles
11	2003–04	Tatiana Navka / Roman Kostomarov	RUS	Ice dance
12	2004–05	Irina Slutskaya	RUS	Women's singles
13	2004–05	Tatiana Navka / Roman Kostomarov	RUS	Ice dance
14	2006–07	Brian Joubert	FRA	Men's singles
15	2006–07	Shen Xue / Zhao Hongbo	CHN	Pairs
16	2007–08	Aliona Savchenko / Robin Szolkowy	GER	Pairs
17	2010–11	Aliona Savchenko / Robin Szolkowy	GER	Pairs
18	2010–11	Meryl Davis / Charlie White	USA	Ice dance
19	2011–12	Patrick Chan	CAN	Men's singles
20	2011–12	Carolina Kostner	ITA	Women's singles
21	2012–13	Tatiana Volosozhar / Maxim Trankov	RUS	Pairs
22	2012–13	Meryl Davis / Charlie White	USA	Ice dance
23	2014–15	Elizaveta Tuktamysheva	RUS	Women's singles
24	2014–15	Meagan Duhamel / Eric Radford	CAN	Pairs
25	2015–16	Evgenia Medvedeva	RUS	Women's singles
26	2016–17	Evgenia Medvedeva	RUS	Women's singles
27	2016–17	Tessa Virtue / Scott Moir	CAN	Ice dance
28	2017–18	Gabriella Papadakis / Guillaume Cizeron	FRA	Ice dance
29	2022–23	Riku Miura / Ryuichi Kihara	JPN	Pairs

Totals by nation

The following table shows the numbers of Grand Slams by nation.

#	Nation	Grand Slams				
#	Nation	Men's singles	Women's singles	Pairs	Ice dance	Total
1	RUS	4	4	2	4	14
2	CAN	1	0	2	1	4
3	FRA	1	0	0	2	3
4	GER	0	0	2	0	2
4	ITA	0	1	0	1	2
4	USA	0	0	0	2	2
7	CHN	0	0	1	0	1
7	JPN	0	0	1	0	1
Total		6	5	8	10	29

== Career Grand Slam ==
The career achievement of all three major annual senior-level international competitions (WC, GPF, and EC or 4CC) is termed a Career Grand Slam. Some skaters have won all three major competitions a second or more times, achieving a double, triple or quadruple Career Grand Slam.

The remainder of this section is a complete list, by discipline, of all skaters who have completed the Career Grand Slam ordered chronologically, the numbers of Career Grand Slams by nation, and the first (or youngest/oldest) skater who achieved the Career Grand Slam. The major competition at which the Career Grand Slam was achieved is indicated in bold.

=== Men's singles ===
Chronological

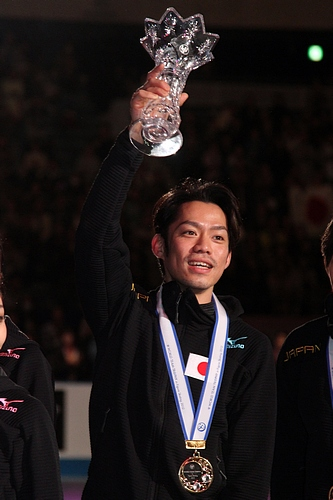
(Japan) Daisuke Takahashi

Ten men's single skaters have completed the Career Grand Slam. Of these skaters, Evgeni Plushenko has achieved a triple Career Grand Slam, Alexei Yagudin and Patrick Chan have achieved a double Career Grand Slam.

#	Skater	Nation	WC	GPF	EC	4CC
1	Alexei Yagudin	RUS	1998	**1999**	1998	
2	Elvis Stojko	CAN	1994	1997		**2000**
3	Evgeni Plushenko	RUS	**2001**	2000	2000	
4	Alexei Yagudin	RUS	1999	**2001**	1999	
5	Evgeni Plushenko	RUS	**2003**	2001	2001	
6	Evgeni Plushenko	RUS	**2004**	2003	2003	
7	Brian Joubert	FRA	**2007**	2004	2006	
8	Evan Lysacek	USA	2009	**2009**		2005
9	Patrick Chan	CAN	**2011**	2010		2009
10	Patrick Chan	CAN	**2012**	2011		2012
11	Daisuke Takahashi	JPN	2010	**2012**		2008
12	Nathan Chen	USA	**2018**	2017		2017
13	Yuzuru Hanyu	JPN	2014	2013		**2020**
14	Shoma Uno	JPN	2022	**2022**		2019

Totals by nation

The following table shows the numbers of Career Grand Slams by nation.

#	Nation	Career Grand Slams
1	RUS	5
2	CAN	3
2	JPN	3
4	USA	2
5	FRA	1

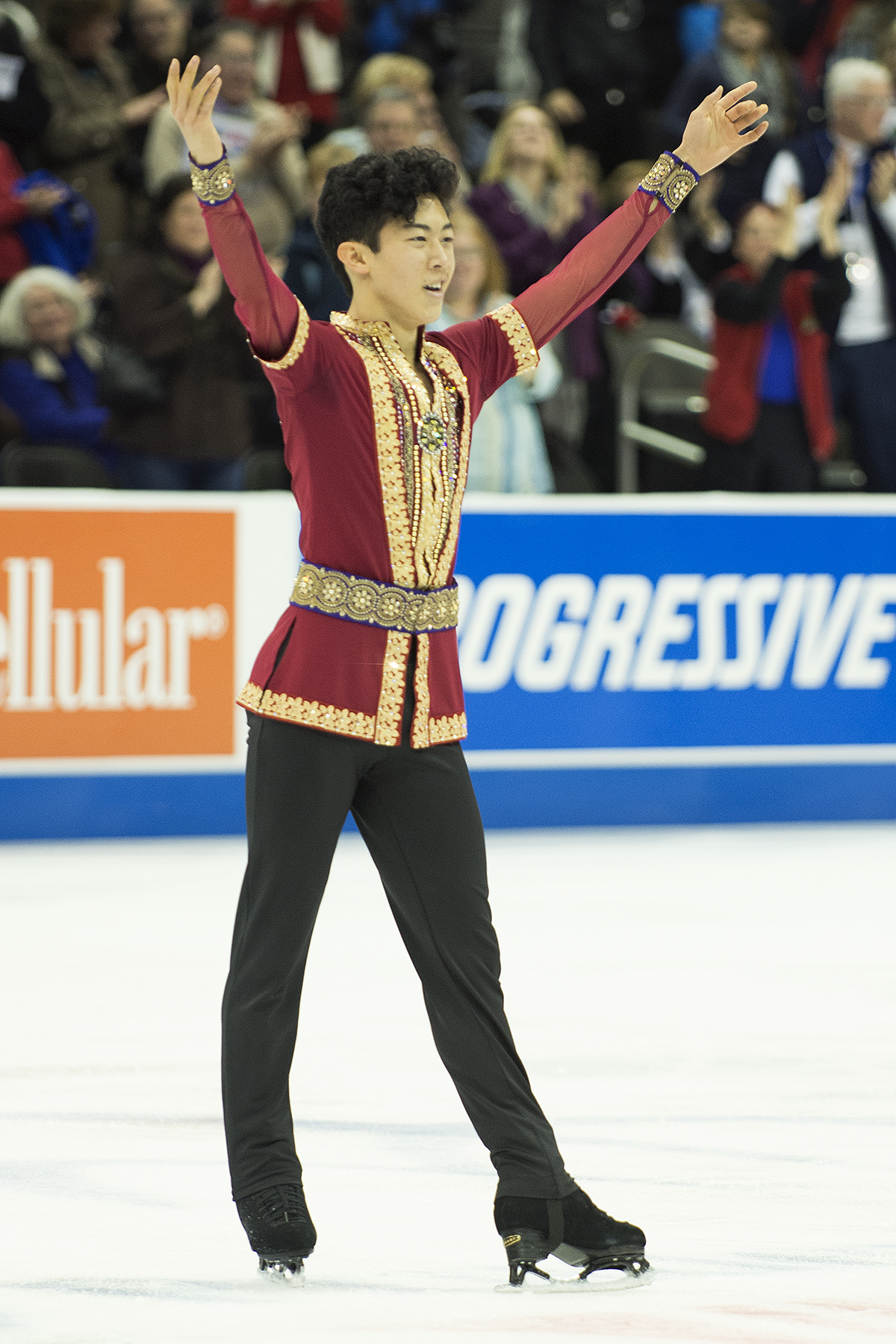
(United States) Nathan Chen

=== Women's singles ===
Chronological

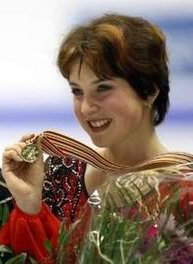
(Russia) Irina Slutskaya

Eight women's single skaters have completed the Career Grand Slam. Of these skaters, Mao Asada has achieved a triple Career Grand Slam, Irina Slutskaya and Evgenia Medvedeva have achieved a double Career Grand Slam.

#	Skater	Nation	WC	GPF	EC	4CC
1	Irina Slutskaya	RUS	**2002**	2000	1996	
2	Irina Slutskaya	RUS	**2005**	2001	1997	
3	Mao Asada	JPN	**2008**	2005		2008
4	Yuna Kim	KOR	**2009**	2006		2009
5	Mao Asada	JPN	**2010**	2008		2010
6	Carolina Kostner	ITA	**2012**	2011	2007	
7	Mao Asada	JPN	**2014**	2012		2013
8	Elizaveta Tuktamysheva	RUS	**2015**	2014	2015	
9	Evgenia Medvedeva	RUS	**2016**	2015	2016	
10	Evgenia Medvedeva	RUS	**2017**	2016	2017	
11	Alina Zagitova	RUS	**2019**	2017	2018	
12	Kaori Sakamoto	JPN	2022	**2023**		2018

Totals by nation

The following table shows the numbers of Career Grand Slams by nation.

#	Nation	Career Grand Slams
1	RUS	6
2	JPN	4
3	ITA	1
3	KOR	1

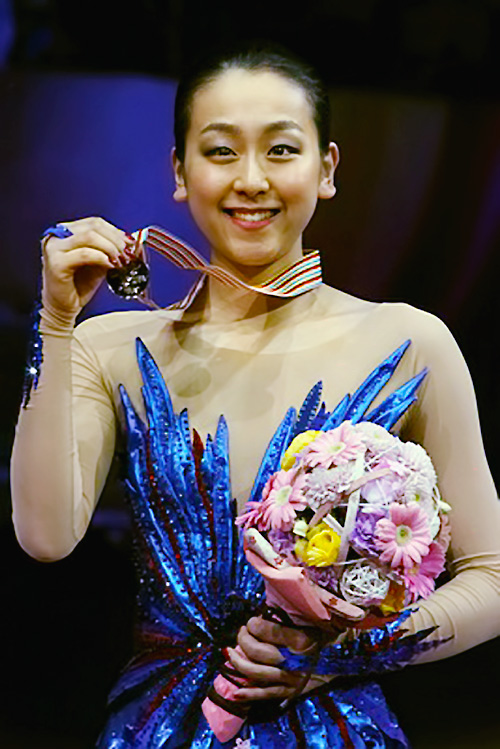
(Japan) Mao Asada

=== Pairs ===
Chronological

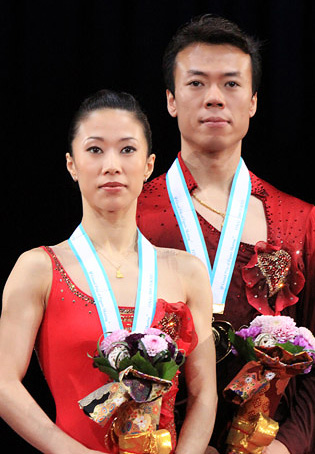
(China) Shen Xue / Zhao Hongbo

Twelve pair teams have completed the Career Grand Slam. Of these teams, one German couple (Aliona Savchenko / Robin Szolkowy) has achieved a quadruple Career Grand Slam, one Chinese couple (Shen Xue / Zhao Hongbo) has achieved a triple Career Grand Slam, and one Russian couple (Tatiana Totmianina / Maxim Marinin), one Japanese couple (Riku Miura / Ryuichi Kihara) have achieved a double Career Grand Slam.

#	Skater	Nation	WC	GPF	EC	4CC
1	Mandy Wötzel / Ingo Steuer	GER	**1997**	1997	1995	
2	Elena Berezhnaya / Anton Sikharulidze	RUS	**1998**	1997	1998	
3	Jamie Salé / David Pelletier	CAN	**2001**	2001		2000
4	Shen Xue / Zhao Hongbo	CHN	**2002**	1999		1999
5	Shen Xue / Zhao Hongbo	CHN	**2003**	2000		2003
6	Tatiana Totmianina / Maxim Marinin	RUS	**2004**	2003	2002	
7	Tatiana Totmianina / Maxim Marinin	RUS	2005	**2005**	2003	
8	Shen Xue / Zhao Hongbo	CHN	**2007**	2003		2007
9	Aliona Savchenko / Robin Szolkowy	GER	**2008**	2007	2007	
10	Pang Qing / Tong Jian	CHN	2006	**2008**		2002
11	Aliona Savchenko / Robin Szolkowy	GER	2009	**2010**	2008	
12	Aliona Savchenko / Robin Szolkowy	GER	2011	**2011**	2009	
13	Tatiana Volosozhar / Maxim Trankov	RUS	**2013**	2012	2012	
14	Aliona Savchenko / Robin Szolkowy	GER	2012	**2013**	2011	
15	Meagan Duhamel / Eric Radford	CAN	**2015**	2014		2013
16	Sui Wenjing / Han Cong	CHN	2017	**2019**		2012
17	Riku Miura / Ryuichi Kihara	JPN	**2023**	2022		2023
18	Riku Miura / Ryuichi Kihara	JPN	2025	**2025**		2025
19	Minerva Fabienne Hase / Nikita Volodin	GER	**2026**	2023	2025	

Totals by nation

The following table shows the numbers of Career Grand Slams by nation.

#	Nation	Career Grand Slams
1	GER	6
2	CHN	5
3	RUS	4
4	CAN	2
4	JPN	2

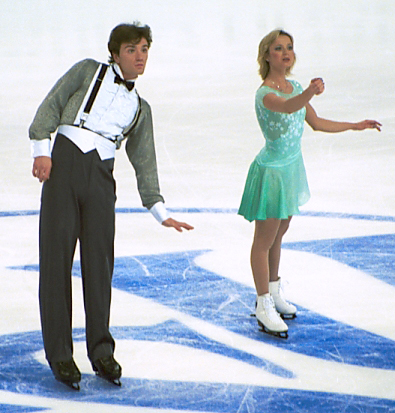
(Russia) Elena Berezhnaya / Anton Sikharulidze

=== Ice dance ===
Chronological

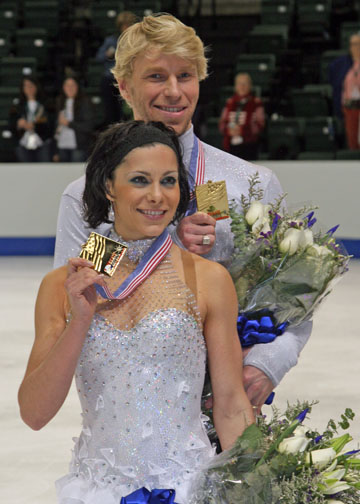
(France) Isabelle Delobel / Olivier Schoenfelder

Thirteen ice dance teams have completed the Career Grand Slam. Of these teams, one American couple (Madison Chock / Evan Bates) has achieved a triple Career Grand Slam, and one French couple (Gabriella Papadakis / Guillaume Cizeron), two Russian couples (Oksana Grishuk / Evgeni Platov and Tatiana Navka / Roman Kostomarov) and one American couple (Meryl Davis / Charlie White) have achieved a double Career Grand Slam.

#	Skater	Nation	WC	GPF	EC	4CC
1	Oksana Grishuk / Evgeni Platov	RUS	1994	**1996**	1996	
2	Oksana Grishuk / Evgeni Platov	RUS	1995	**1997**	1997	
3	Anjelika Krylova / Oleg Ovsyannikov	RUS	1998	**1999**	1999	
4	Marina Anissina / Gwendal Peizerat	FRA	**2000**	2000	2000	
5	Barbara Fusar-Poli / Maurizio Margaglio	ITA	**2001**	2001	2001	
6	Irina Lobacheva / Ilia Averbukh	RUS	2002	**2003**	2003	
7	Shae-Lynn Bourne / Victor Kraatz	CAN	**2003**	2001		1999
8	Tatiana Navka / Roman Kostomarov	RUS	**2004**	2003	2004	
9	Tatiana Navka / Roman Kostomarov	RUS	**2005**	2004	2005	
10	Isabelle Delobel / Olivier Schoenfelder	FRA	2008	**2008**	2007	
11	Oksana Domnina / Maxim Shabalin	RUS	**2009**	2007	2008	
12	Meryl Davis / Charlie White	USA	**2011**	2009		2009
13	Meryl Davis / Charlie White	USA	**2013**	2010		2011
14	Tessa Virtue / Scott Moir	CAN	2010	**2016**		2008
15	Gabriella Papadakis / Guillaume Cizeron	FRA	2015	**2017**	2015	
16	Gabriella Papadakis / Guillaume Cizeron	FRA	2016	**2019**	2016	
17	Madison Chock / Evan Bates	USA	2023	**2023**		2019
18	Madison Chock / Evan Bates	USA	2024	**2024**		2020
19	Madison Chock / Evan Bates	USA	2025	**2025**		2023

Totals by nation

The following table shows the numbers of Career Grand Slams by nation.

#	Nation	Career Grand Slams
1	RUS	7
2	USA	5
3	FRA	4
4	CAN	2
5	ITA	1
Total		18

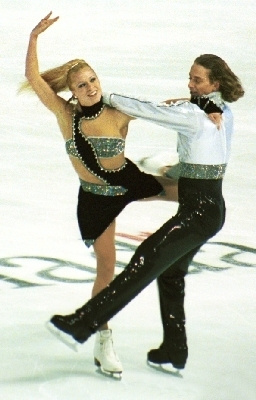
(Canada) Shae-Lynn Bourne / Victor Kraatz

=== All disciplines ===
Chronological

To date, eighteen single skaters and twenty-five couples have completed the Career Grand Slam. Of these skaters, one couple has achieved a quadruple Career Grand Slam, two single skaters and one couple have achieved a triple Career Grand Slam, and four single skaters and five couples have achieved a double Career Grand Slam.

#	Skater	Nation	Discipline	WC	GPF	EC	4CC
1	Oksana Grishuk / Evgeni Platov	RUS	Ice dance	1994	**1996**	1996	
2	Mandy Wötzel / Ingo Steuer	GER	Pairs	**1997**	1997	1995	
3	Oksana Grishuk / Evgeni Platov	RUS	Ice dance	1995	**1997**	1997	
4	Elena Berezhnaya / Anton Sikharulidze	RUS	Pairs	**1998**	1997	1998	
5	Alexei Yagudin	RUS	Men's singles	1998	**1999**	1998	
6	Anjelika Krylova / Oleg Ovsyannikov	RUS	Ice dance	1998	**1999**	1999	
7	Elvis Stojko	CAN	Men's singles	1994	1997		**2000**
8	Marina Anissina / Gwendal Peizerat	FRA	Ice dance	**2000**	2000	2000	
9	Evgeni Plushenko	RUS	Men's singles	**2001**	2000	2000	
10	Jamie Salé / David Pelletier	CAN	Pairs	**2001**	2001		2000
11	Barbara Fusar-Poli / Maurizio Margaglio	ITA	Ice dance	**2001**	2001	2001	
12	Alexei Yagudin	RUS	Men's singles	1999	**2001**	1999	
13	Irina Slutskaya	RUS	Women's singles	**2002**	2000	1996	
14	Shen Xue / Zhao Hongbo	CHN	Pairs	**2002**	1999		1999
15	Irina Lobacheva / Ilia Averbukh	RUS	Ice dance	2002	**2003**	2003	
16	Evgeni Plushenko	RUS	Men's singles	**2003**	2001	2001	
17	Shen Xue / Zhao Hongbo	CHN	Pairs	**2003**	2000		2003
18	Shae-Lynn Bourne / Victor Kraatz	CAN	Ice dance	**2003**	2001		1999
19	Evgeni Plushenko	RUS	Men's singles	**2004**	2003	2003	
20	Tatiana Totmianina / Maxim Marinin	RUS	Pairs	**2004**	2003	2002	
21	Tatiana Navka / Roman Kostomarov	RUS	Ice dance	**2004**	2003	2004	
22	Irina Slutskaya	RUS	Women's singles	**2005**	2001	1997	
23	Tatiana Totmianina / Maxim Marinin	RUS	Pairs	2005	**2005**	2003	
24	Tatiana Navka / Roman Kostomarov	RUS	Ice dance	**2005**	2004	2005	
25	Brian Joubert	FRA	Men's singles	**2007**	2004	2006	
26	Shen Xue / Zhao Hongbo	CHN	Pairs	**2007**	2003		2007
27	Mao Asada	JPN	Women's singles	**2008**	2005		2008
28	Aliona Savchenko / Robin Szolkowy	GER	Pairs	**2008**	2007	2007	
29	Pang Qing / Tong Jian	CHN	Pairs	2006	**2008**		2002
30	Isabelle Delobel / Olivier Schoenfelder	FRA	Ice dance	2008	**2008**	2007	
31	Yuna Kim	KOR	Women's singles	**2009**	2006		2009
32	Oksana Domnina / Maxim Shabalin	RUS	Ice dance	**2009**	2007	2008	
33	Evan Lysacek	USA	Men's singles	2009	**2009**		2005
34	Mao Asada	JPN	Women's singles	**2010**	2008		2010
35	Aliona Savchenko / Robin Szolkowy	GER	Pairs	2009	**2010**	2008	
36	Patrick Chan	CAN	Men's singles	**2011**	2010		2009
37	Meryl Davis / Charlie White	USA	Ice dance	**2011**	2009		2009
38	Aliona Savchenko / Robin Szolkowy	GER	Pairs	2011	**2011**	2009	
39	Patrick Chan	CAN	Men's singles	**2012**	2011		2012
40	Carolina Kostner	ITA	Women's singles	**2012**	2011	2007	
41	Daisuke Takahashi	JPN	Men's singles	2010	**2012**		2008
42	Tatiana Volosozhar / Maxim Trankov	RUS	Pairs	**2013**	2012	2012	
43	Meryl Davis / Charlie White	USA	Ice dance	**2013**	2010		2011
44	Aliona Savchenko / Robin Szolkowy	GER	Pairs	2012	**2013**	2011	
45	Mao Asada	JPN	Women's singles	**2014**	2012		2013
46	Elizaveta Tuktamysheva	RUS	Women's singles	**2015**	2014	2015	
47	Meagan Duhamel / Eric Radford	CAN	Pairs	**2015**	2014		2013
48	Evgenia Medvedeva	RUS	Women's singles	**2016**	2015	2016	
49	Tessa Virtue / Scott Moir	CAN	Ice dance	2010	**2016**		2008
50	Evgenia Medvedeva	RUS	Women's singles	**2017**	2016	2017	
51	Gabriella Papadakis / Guillaume Cizeron	FRA	Ice dance	2015	**2017**	2015	
52	Nathan Chen	USA	Men's singles	**2018**	2017		2017
53	Alina Zagitova	RUS	Women's singles	**2019**	2017	2018	
54	Sui Wenjing / Han Cong	CHN	Pairs	2017	**2019**		2012
55	Gabriella Papadakis / Guillaume Cizeron	FRA	Ice dance	2016	**2019**	2016	
56	Yuzuru Hanyu	JPN	Men's singles	2014	2013		**2020**
57	Shoma Uno	JPN	Men's singles	2022	**2022**		2019
58	Riku Miura / Ryuichi Kihara	JPN	Pairs	**2023**	2022		2023
59	Madison Chock / Evan Bates	USA	Ice dance	2023	**2023**		2019
60	Kaori Sakamoto	JPN	Women's singles	2022	**2023**		2018
61	Madison Chock / Evan Bates	USA	Ice dance	2024	**2024**		2020
62	Riku Miura / Ryuichi Kihara	JPN	Pairs	2025	**2025**		2025
63	Minerva Fabienne Hase / Nikita Volodin	GER	Pairs	**2026**	2023	2025	

Totals by nation

The following table shows the numbers of Career Grand Slams by nation.

#	Nation	Career Grand Slams				
#	Nation	Men's singles	Women's singles	Pairs	Ice dance	Total
1	RUS	5	6	4	7	22
2	JPN	3	4	2	0	9
3	CAN	3	0	2	2	7
4	USA	2	0	0	5	7
4	GER	0	0	6	0	6
6	CHN	0	0	5	0	5
6	FRA	1	0	0	4	5
8	ITA	0	1	0	1	2
9	KOR	0	1	0	0	1
Total		14	12	19	19	64

== Junior Grand Slam ==
Junior Grand Slam (JGS) is a term used by fans of figure skating for the winning all four major annual junior-level international competitions (Both allocated Junior Grand Prix, Junior Grand Prix Final, and Junior World Championships) within a single season within one of the four disciplines: men's singles, women's singles, pairs, and ice dance. Winning all four annual junior-level international competitions at any point during the course of a career is called a "Career Junior Grand Slam". In pair skating and ice dancing, one team may accomplish a Junior Career Grand Slam skating together or one skater may achieve it with different partners.

The remainder of this section is a complete list, by discipline, of all skaters who have completed the Junior Grand Slam ordered chronologically, and the numbers of Junior Grand Slams by nation.

=== Men's singles ===
Chronological

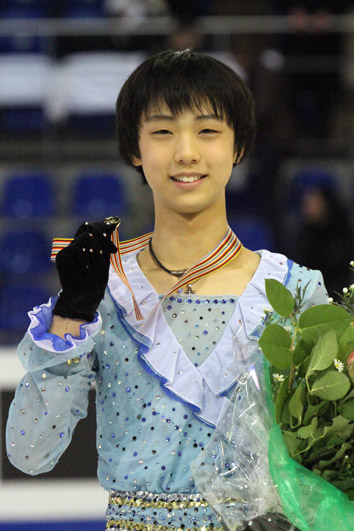
(Japan) Yuzuru Hanyu Completing his Junior Grand Slam at the 2010 Junior World Championships

Three men's single skaters have completed the Junior Grand Slam.

#	Season	Skater	Nation
1	2002–03	Alexander Shubin	RUS
2	2006–07	Stephen Carriere	USA
3	2009–10	Yuzuru Hanyu	JPN

Totals by nation

The following table shows the numbers of Junior Grand Slams by nation.

#	Nation	Junior Grand Slams
1	RUS	1
1	USA	1
1	JPN	1

=== Women's singles ===
Chronological

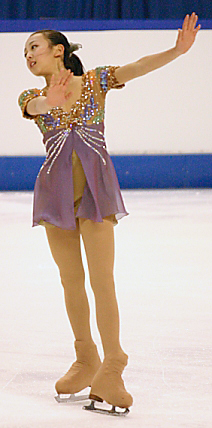
(Japan) Mao Asada Completing her Junior Grand Slam at the 2005 Junior World Championships

Thirteen women's single skaters have completed the Junior Grand Slam. Of these skaters, only one (Mao Shimada) has accomplished the feat more than once, winning all four major competitions for 4 consecutive seasons between the 2022-23 and 2025-26 seasons. She remains the only skater to ever complete four Junior Grand Slams, and the only skater to remain undefeated throughout their entire international career.

#	Season	Skater	Nation
1	2002–03	Yukina Ota	JPN
2	2003–04	Miki Ando	JPN
3	2004–05	Mao Asada	JPN
4	2005–06	Yuna Kim	KOR
5	2006–07	Caroline Zhang	USA
6	2009–10	Kanako Murakami	JPN
7	2010–11	Adelina Sotnikova	RUS
8	2011–12	Yulia Lipnitskaya	RUS
9	2012–13	Elena Radionova	RUS
10	2014–15	Evgenia Medvedeva	RUS
11	2017–18	Alexandra Trusova	RUS
12	2019–20	Kamila Valieva	RUS
13	2022–23	Mao Shimada	JPN
14	2023–24	Mao Shimada	JPN
15	2024–25	Mao Shimada	JPN
16	2025–26	Mao Shimada	JPN

Totals by nation

The following table shows the numbers of Junior Grand Slams by nation.

#	Nation	Junior Grand Slams
1	JPN	8
2	RUS	6
3	KOR	1
3	USA	1

=== Pairs ===
Chronological

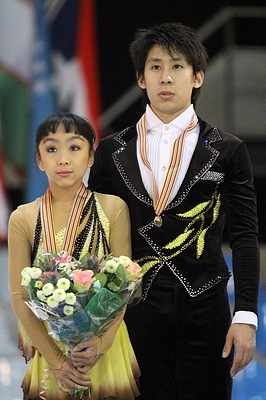
(China) Sui Wenjing / Han Cong Completing their Junior Grand Slams at the 2010 Junior World Championships

Nine pair teams have completed the Junior Grand Slam. As of the 2025-26 season, only one Chinese couple (Sui Wenjing / Han Cong) has completed the feat twice.

#	Season	Couple	Nation
1	2000–01	Zhang Dan / Zhang Hao	CHN
2	2004–05	Maria Murkhortova / Maxim Trankov	RUS
3	2006–07	Keauna McLaughlin / Rockne Brubake	USA
4	2008–09	Liubov Ilyushechkina / Nodari Maisuradze	RUS
5	2009–10	Sui Wenjing / Han Cong	CHN
6	2011–12	Sui Wenjing / Han Cong	CHN
7	2013–14	Yu Xiaoyu / Jin Yang	CHN
8	2018–19	Anastasia Mishina / Aleksandr Gallaimov	RUS
9	2019–20	Apollinariia Panfilova / Dmitry Rylov	RUS
10	2023–24	Anastasiia Metelkina / Luka Berulava	GEO

Totals by nation

The following table shows the numbers of Junior Grand Slams by nation.

#	Nation	Grand Slams
1	RUS	4
1	CHN	4
3	GEO	1
3	USA	1

=== Ice dance ===
Chronological

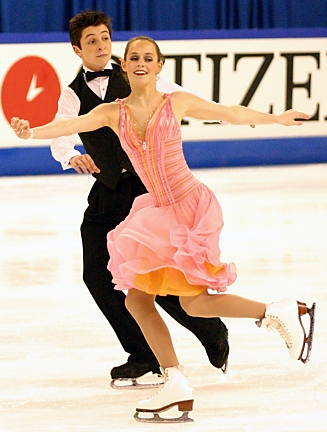
(Canada) Tessa Virtue / Scott Moir completing their Junior Grand Slams at the 2006 Junior World Championships

Fourteen ice dance teams have completed the Junior Grand Slam. As of the 2025-26 season, no team has completed the feat twice.

#	Season	Couple	Nation
1	1999–00	Natalia Romaniuta / Daniil Barantsev	RUS
2	2002–03	Oksana Domnina / Maxim Shabalin	RUS
3	2004–05	Morgan Matthews / Maxim Zavozin	USA
4	2005–06	Tessa Virtue / Scott Moir	CAN
5	2008–09	Madison Chock / Greg Zuerlein	USA
6	2010–11	Ksenia Monko / Kirill Khalyavin	RUS
7	2011–12	Victoria Sinitsina / Ruslan Zhiganshin	RUS
8	2012–13	Alexandra Stepanova / Ivan Bukin	RUS
9	2014–15	Anna Janovskaya / Sergei Mozgov	RUS
10	2015–16	Lorraine McNamara / Quinn Carpenter	USA
11	2016–17	Rachael Parsons / Michael Parsons	USA
12	2023–24	Leah Neset / Artem Markelov	USA
13	2024–25	Noemi Tali / Noah Lafonara	ITA
14	2025–26	Hana Maria Aboian / Daniil Veselukhin	USA

Totals by nation

The following table shows the numbers of Junior Grand Slams by nation.

#	Nation	Junior Grand Slams
1	USA	6
2	RUS	6
3	CAN	1
3	ITA	1

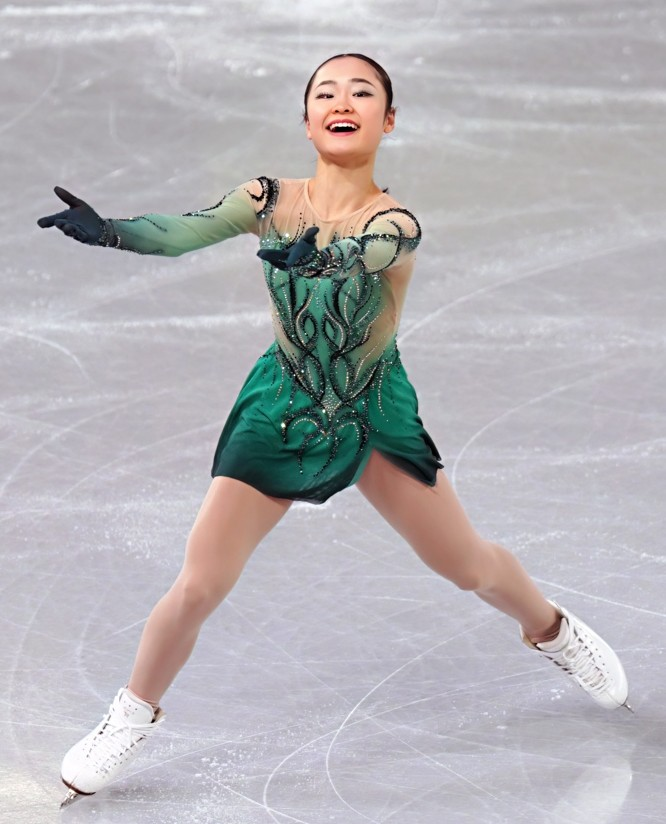
(Japan) Mao Shimada, 4 season consecutive Junior Grand Slam holder.

=== All disciplines ===
Chronological

To date, sixteen single skaters and twenty-three couples have completed the Junior Grand Slam. Of these skaters, Chinese couples of Sui Wenjing and Han Cong has completed twice, Mao Shimada has completed the feat multiple times, achieving 4 consecutive Junior Grand Slams between the 2022-23 and 2025-26 seasons.

#	Season	Skater	Nation	Discipline
1	1999–00	Natalia Romaniuta / Daniil Barantsev	RUS	Ice Dance
2	2001–02	Zhang Dan / Zhang Hao	CHN	Pairs
3	2002–03	Alexander Shubin	RUS	Men's Singles
4	2002–03	Yukina Ota	JPN	Women's Singles
5	2002–03	Oksana Domnina / Maxim Shabalin	RUS	Ice Dance
6	2003–04	Miki Ando	JPN	Women's Singles
7	2004–05	Mao Asada	JPN	Women's Singles
8	2004–05	Maria Murkhortova / Maxim Trankov	RUS	Pairs
9	2004–05	Morgan Matthews / Maxim Zavozin	USA	Ice Dance
10	2005–06	Yuna Kim	KOR	Women's Singles
11	2005–06	Tessa Virtue / Scott Moir	CAN	Ice dance
12	2006–07	Stephen Carriere	USA	Men's singles
13	2006–07	Caroline Zhang	USA	Women's Singles
14	2006–07	Keauna McLaughlin / Rockne Brubake	USA	Pairs
15	2008–09	Liubov Ilyushechkina / Nodari Maisuradze	RUS	Pairs
16	2008–09	Madison Chock / Greg Zuerlein	USA	Ice Dance
17	2009–10	Yuzuru Hanyu	JPN	Men's Singles
18	2009–10	Kanako Murakami	JPN	Women's singles
19	2009–10	Sui Wenjing / Han Cong	CHN	Pairs
20	2010–11	Adelina Sotnikova	RUS	Women's singles
21	2010–11	Ksenia Monko / Kirill Khalyavin	RUS	Ice Dance
22	2011–12	Yulia Lipnitskaya	RUS	Women's Singles
23	2011–12	Victoria Sinitsina / Ruslan Zhiganshin	RUS	Ice Dance
24	2011–12	Sui Wenjing / Han Cong	CHN	Pairs
25	2012–13	Elena Radionova	RUS	Women's Singles
26	2012–13	Alexandra Stepanova / Ivan Bukin	RUS	Ice Dance
27	2013–14	Yu Xiaoyu / Jin Yang	CHN	Pairs
28	2014–15	Evgenia Medvedeva	RUS	Women's singles
29	2014–15	Anna Janovskaya / Sergei Mozgov	RUS	Ice Dance
30	2015–16	Lorraine McNamara / Quinn Carpenter	USA	Ice dance
31	2016–17	Rachael Parsons / Michael Parsons	USA	Ice Dance
32	2017–18	Alexandra Trusova	RUS	Women's Singles
33	2018–19	Anastasia Mishina / Aleksandr Gallaimov	RUS	Pairs
34	2019–20	Kamila Valieva	RUS	Women's singles
35	2019–20	Apollinariia Panfilova / Dmitry Rylov	RUS	Pairs
36	2022–23	Mao Shimada	JPN	Women's Singles
37	2023–24	Mao Shimada	JPN	Women's Singles
38	2023–24	Anastasiia Metelkina / Luka Berulava	GEO	Pairs
39	2023–24	Leah Neset / Artem Markelov	USA	Ice Dance
40	2024–25	Mao Shimada	JPN	Women's Singles
41	2024–25	Noemi Tali / Noah Lafonara	ITA	Ice Dance
42	2025–26	Hana Maria Aboian / Daniil Veselukhin	USA	Ice Dance
43	2025–26	Mao Shimada	JPN	Women's Singles

Totals by nation

The following table shows the numbers of Junior Grand Slams by nation.

#	Nation	Junior Grand Slams				
#	Nation	Men's singles	Women's singles	Pairs	Ice dance	Total
1	RUS	1	6	4	6	17
2	USA	1	1	1	6	9
2	JPN	1	8	0	0	9
4	CHN	0	0	4	0	4
5	KOR	0	1	0	0	1
5	CAN	0	0	0	1	1
7	GEO	0	0	1	0	1
7	ITA	0	0	0	1	1
Total		3	16	10	14	43

== Junior Golden Slam ==
The Junior Golden Slam is the junior-level equivalent to the Golden Slam, first coined by fans following the establishment of the Winter Youth Olympic Games in 2012. Winning the gold medal at the Youth Olympic Games in addition to the four major annual junior-level international competitions (JGP, JGPF, JWC) within a single season is called a "Junior Golden Grand Slam" or "Junior Golden Slam"

As of the 2025-26 season, one single skater and one couple have completed the Junior Golden Slam.

#	Season	Skater	Nation	Age	Discipline
1	2019–20	Apollinariia Panfilova / Dmitry Rylov	RUS	17 / 18	Pairs
2	2023–24	Mao Shimada	JPN	15	Women's Singles

== Golden Slam ==
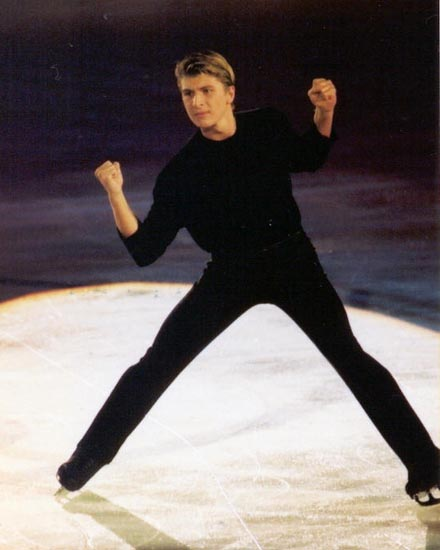
(Russia) Alexei Yagudin

Figure skating was first contested in the Olympic Games ("OG") in 1908. Since 1924, the sport has been a part of the Winter Olympic Games. The four disciplines of men's singles, women's singles, pairs and ice dance also appeared as part of a team event for the first time at the 2014 Winter Olympics.

Winning the gold medal at the Olympic Games in addition to the three major annual senior-level international competitions (WC, GPF, and EC or 4CC) within a single season is called a "Golden Grand Slam" or "Golden Slam".

Only one skater has completed the Golden Slam.

#	Season	Skater	Nation	Age	Discipline
1	2001–02	Alexei Yagudin	RUS	22	Men's singles

== Career Golden Slam ==
A skater who wins all three major annual senior-level international competitions (WC, GPF, and EC or 4CC) and the Olympic gold medal during their career is said to have achieved a Career Golden Grand Slam or Career Golden Slam. Few skaters have won the gold medal in the individual event at the Olympic Games in addition to all three major competitions a second time, achieving a double Career Golden Slam.

The remainder of this section is a complete list, by discipline, of all skaters who have completed the Career Golden Slam ordered chronologically, the numbers of Career Golden Slams in the individual event by nation, and the first (or youngest/oldest) skater who achieved the Career Golden Slam in the individual event. The event at which the Career Golden Slam was achieved is indicated in bold.

=== Men's singles ===
Chronological

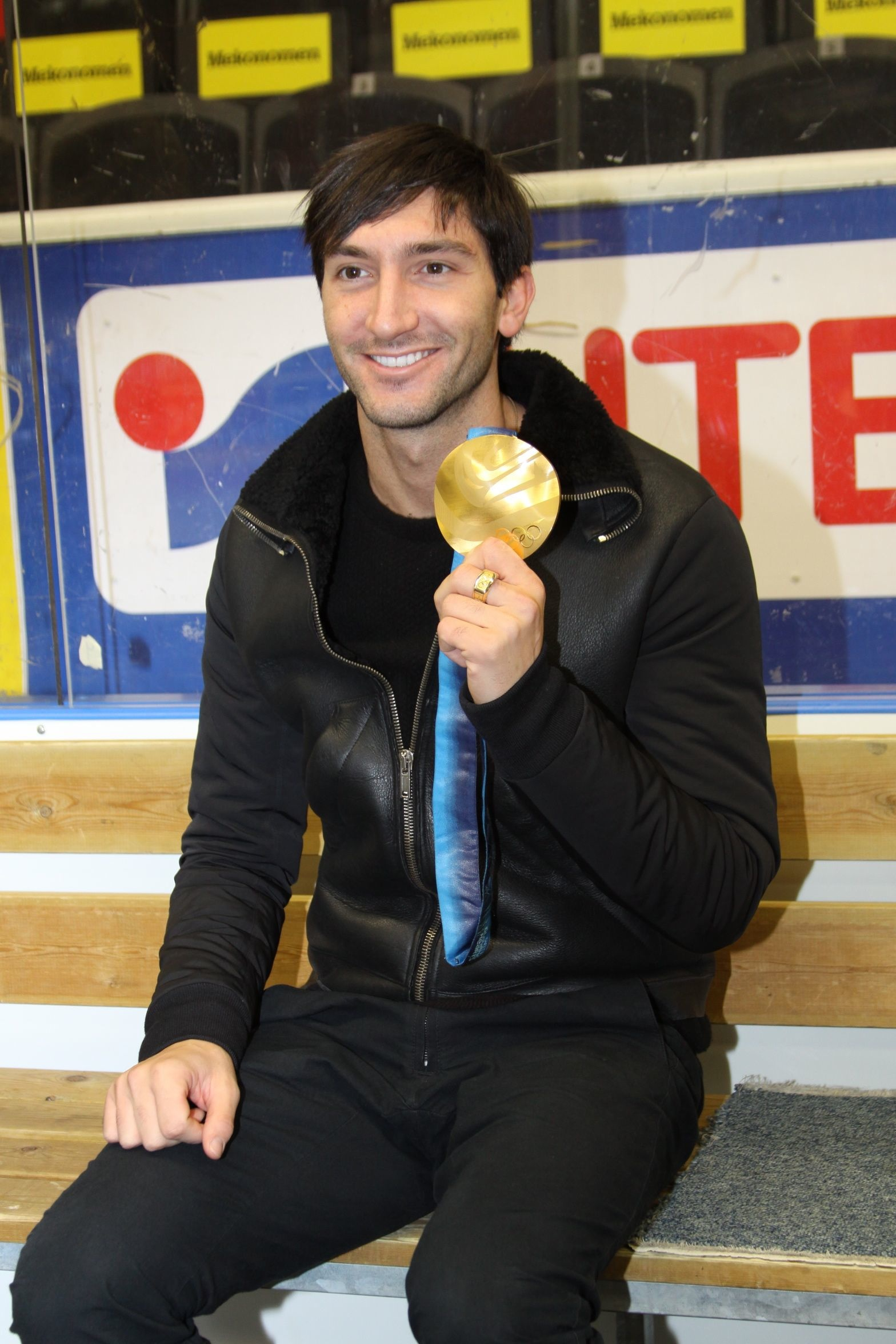
(United States) Evan Lysacek

Six men's single skaters have completed the Career Golden Slam. Of these skaters, five have won the Olympic gold medal in the individual event, and three have won the Olympic gold medal in the team event.

#	Skater	Nation	OG	WC	GPF	EC	4CC
1	Alexei Yagudin	RUS	**2002**	1998	1999	1998	
2	Evgeni Plushenko	RUS	**2006**	2001	2000	2000	
3	Evan Lysacek	USA	**2010**	2009	2009		2005
4	Yuzuru Hanyu	JPN	2014	2014	2013		**2020**
5	Nathan Chen	USA	**2022**	2018	2017		2017

#	Skater	Nation	OG Team	WC	GPF	EC	4CC
1	Evgeni Plushenko	RUS	**2014 T**^{*}	2003	2001	2001	
2	Patrick Chan	CAN	**2018 T**^{*}	2011	2010		2009
3	Nathan Chen	USA	**2022 T**^{*}	2018	2017		2017

^{*}The team event at the Olympics is indicated by "T".

Totals by nation

The following table shows the numbers of Career Golden Slams in the individual event by nation.

#	Nation	Career Golden Slams in the individual event
1	RUS	2
1	USA	2
3	JPN	1
Total		5

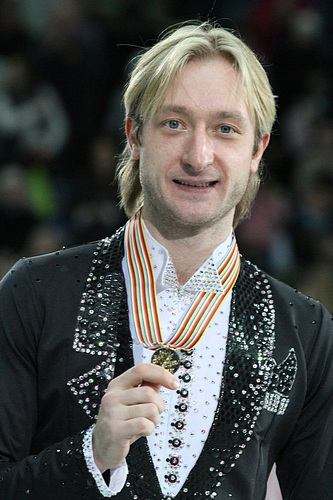
(Russia) Evgeni Plushenko

=== Women's singles ===
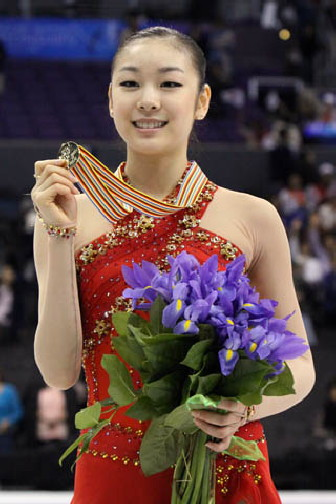
(South Korea) Yuna Kim

Only two women's single skaters have completed the Career Golden Slam. Both of these women have also completed the Career Super Grand Slam by winning every major competition in their career, both junior and senior, including the Olympics.

Yuna Kim is the first, Alina Zagitova is the youngest woman to do so.

#	Skater	Nation	OG	WC	GPF	EC	4CC
1	Yuna Kim	KOR	**2010**	2009	2006		2009
2	Alina Zagitova	RUS	2018	**2019**	2017	2018	

=== Pairs ===
Chronological

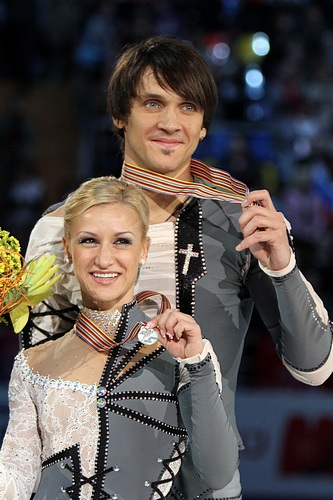
(Russia) Tatiana Volosozhar / Maxim Trankov

Seventeen pair skaters have completed the Career Golden Slam. Of these skaters, Fifteen have won the Olympic gold medal in the individual event, and two teams have won the Olympic gold medal in the team event.

#	Skater	Nation	OG	WC	GPF	EC	4CC
1	Elena Berezhnaya / Anton Sikharulidze	RUS	**2002** (Note: No silver medal was awarded in the 2002 Olympic figure skating pairs event, as the Canadians Salé and Pelletier were also given a gold medal, in the aftermath of a judging scandal.)	1998	1997	1998	
2	Jamie Salé / David Pelletier	CAN	**2002**	2001	2001		2000
3	Tatiana Totmianina / Maxim Marinin	RUS	**2006**	2004	2003	2002	
4	Shen Xue / Zhao Hongbo	CHN	**2010**	2002	1999		1999
5	Tatiana Volosozhar / Maxim Trankov	RUS	**2014**	2013	2012	2012	
6	Aliona Savchenko (Note: From 1998 to 2002, Aliona Savchenko teamed up with Stanislav Morozov and represented Ukraine. In 2003, she left Ukraine and teamed up with Robin Szolkowy representing Germany. Szolkowy retired from competition in 2014, she then teamed up with Bruno Massot.)	GER	**2018**	2008	2007	2007	
7	Sui Wenjing / Han Cong	CHN	**2022**	2017	2019		2012
8	Riku Miura / Ryuichi Kihara	JPN	**2026**	2023	2022		2023

#	Skater	Nation	OG Team	WC	GPF	EC	4CC
1	Tatiana Volosozhar / Maxim Trankov	RUS	**2014 T**^{*}	2013	2012	2012	
2	Meagan Duhamel / Eric Radford	CAN	**2018 T**^{*}	2015	2014		2013

^{*}The team event at the Olympics is indicated by "T".

Totals by nation

The following table shows the numbers of Career Golden Slams in the individual event by nation.

#	Nation	Career Golden Slams in the individual event
1	RUS	3
2	CHN	2
3	CAN	1
3	JPN	1
5	GER	0.5
Total		7.5

=== Ice dance ===
Chronological

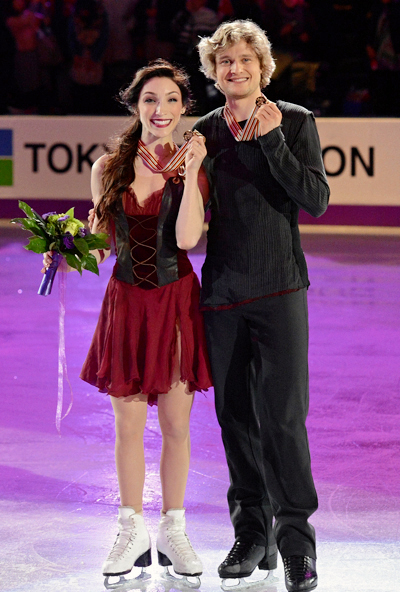
(United States) Meryl Davis / Charlie White

Seven ice dance teams have completed the Career Golden Slam. Of these skaters, Six ice dance teams have won the Olympic gold medal in the individual event, and two teams have won the Olympic gold medal in the team event.

Oksana Grishuk, Evgeni Platov and Guillaume Cizeron are the only three skaters who have achieved a double Career Golden Slam.

#	Skater	Nation	OG	WC	GPF	EC	4CC
1	Oksana Grishuk / Evgeni Platov	RUS	1994	1994	**1996**	1996	
2	Oksana Grishuk / Evgeni Platov	RUS	**1998**	1995	1997	1997	
3	Marina Anissina / Gwendal Peizerat	FRA	**2002**	2000	2000	2000	
4	Tatiana Navka / Roman Kostomarov	RUS	**2006**	2004	2003	2004	
5	Meryl Davis / Charlie White	USA	**2014**	2011	2009		2009
6	Tessa Virtue / Scott Moir	CAN	2010	2010	**2016**		2008
7	Gabriella Papadakis / Guillaume Cizeron	FRA	**2022**	2015	2017	2015	
8	Guillaume Cizeron (Note: Guillaume Cizeron teamed up with Gabriella Papadakis from 2004 to 2024, completing his first Career Golden Slam together. He then teamed up with Laurence Fournier Beaudry from 2025, winning the 2026 Olympics to complete his second Career Golden Slam.)	FRA	**2026**	2016	2019	2016	

#	Skater	Nation	OG Team	WC	GPF	EC	4CC
1	Tessa Virtue / Scott Moir	CAN	**2018 T**^{*}	2010	2016		2008
2	Madison Chock / Evan Bates	USA	2022 T^{*}	2023	**2023**		2019

^{*}The team event at the Olympics is indicated by "T".

Totals by nation

The following table shows the numbers of Career Golden Slams in the individual event by nation.

#	Nation	Career Golden Slams in the individual event
1	RUS	3
2	FRA	2.5
3	CAN	1
3	USA	1
Total		7.5

=== All disciplines ===
Chronological

To date, six men's single skaters, two women's single skaters, seventeen pair skaters and seven ice dance teams have completed the Career Golden Slam. Of these skaters, five men's single skaters, two women's single skaters, fifteen pair skaters and six ice dance teams have won the Olympic gold medal in the individual event; three men's single skaters, two pair teams and two dance teams have won the Olympic gold medal in the team event.

#	Skater	Nation	Discipline	OG	WC	GPF	EC	4CC
1	Oksana Grishuk / Evgeni Platov	RUS	Ice dance	1994	1994	**1996**	1996	
2	Oksana Grishuk / Evgeni Platov	RUS	Ice dance	**1998**	1995	1997	1997	
3	Alexei Yagudin	RUS	Men's singles	**2002**	1998	1999	1998	
4	Elena Berezhnaya / Anton Sikharulidze	RUS	Pairs	**2002**	1998	1997	1998	
5	Jamie Salé / David Pelletier	CAN	Pairs	**2002**	2001	2001		2000
6	Marina Anissina / Gwendal Peizerat	FRA	Ice dance	**2002**	2000	2000	2000	
7	Evgeni Plushenko	RUS	Men's singles	**2006**	2001	2000	2000	
8	Tatiana Totmianina / Maxim Marinin	RUS	Pairs	**2006**	2004	2003	2002	
9	Tatiana Navka / Roman Kostomarov	RUS	Ice dance	**2006**	2004	2003	2004	
10	Evan Lysacek	USA	Men's singles	**2010**	2009	2009		2005
11	Yuna Kim	KOR	Women's singles	**2010**	2009	2006		2009
12	Shen Xue / Zhao Hongbo	CHN	Pairs	**2010**	2002	1999		1999
13	Tatiana Volosozhar / Maxim Trankov	RUS	Pairs	**2014**	2013	2012	2012	
14	Meryl Davis / Charlie White	USA	Ice dance	**2014**	2011	2009		2009
15	Tessa Virtue / Scott Moir	CAN	Ice dance	2010	2010	**2016**		2008
16	Aliona Savchenko	GER	Pairs	**2018**	2008	2007	2007	
17	Alina Zagitova	RUS	Women's singles	2018	**2019**	2017	2018	
18	Yuzuru Hanyu	JPN	Men's Singles	2014	2014	2013		**2020**
19	Nathan Chen	USA	Men's Singles	**2022**	2018	2017		2017
20	Gabriella Papadakis / Guillaume Cizeron	FRA	Ice dance	**2022**	2015	2017	2015	
21	Sui Wenjing / Han Cong	CHN	Pairs	**2022**	2017	2019		2012
22	Guillaume Cizeron	FRA	Ice dance	**2026**	2016	2019	2016	
23	Riku Miura / Ryuichi Kihara	JPN	Pairs	**2026**	2023	2022		2023

#	Skater	Nation	Discipline	OG Team	WC	GPF	EC	4CC
1	Evgeni Plushenko	RUS	Men's singles	**2014 T**^{*}	2001	2000	2000	
2	Tatiana Volosozhar / Maxim Trankov	RUS	Pairs	**2014 T**^{*}	2013	2012	2012	
3	Patrick Chan	CAN	Men's singles	**2018 T**^{*}	2011	2010		2009
4	Meagan Duhamel / Eric Radford	CAN	Pairs	**2018 T**^{*}	2015	2014		2013
5	Tessa Virtue / Scott Moir	CAN	Ice dance	**2018 T**^{*}	2010	2016		2008
6	Nathan Chen	USA	Men's Singles	**2022 T**^{*}	2018	2017		2017
7	Madison Chock / Evan Bates	USA	Ice dance	2022 T^{*}	2023	**2023**		2019

^{*}The team event at the Olympics is indicated by "T".

Totals by nation

The following table shows the numbers of Career Golden Slams in the individual event by nation.

#	Nation	Career Golden Slams in the individual event				
#	Nation	Men's singles	Women's singles	Pairs	Ice dance	Total
1	RUS	2	1	3	3	9
2	USA	2	0	0	1	3
3	FRA	0	0	0	2.5	2.5
4	JPN	1	0	1	0	2
4	CAN	0	0	1	1	2
4	CHN	0	0	2	0	2
7	KOR	0	1	0	0	1
8	GER	0	0	0.5	0	0.5
Total		5	2	7.5	7.5	22

== Super Slam ==
Winning all major international competitions at both junior level (World Junior Championships, Junior Grand Prix Final) and senior level (Olympic Games, World Championships, Grand Prix of Figure Skating Final, and either European Championships or Four Continents Championships) at any point during the course of a career is called a "Career Super Grand Slam" or "Super Slam".

The remainder of this section is a complete list, by discipline, of all skaters who have completed the Super Slam ordered chronologically, the numbers of Super Slams by nation, and the first (or youngest/oldest) skater who achieved the Super Slam. The major competition at which the Super Slam was achieved is indicated in bold.

=== Men's singles ===
Yuzuru Hanyu is the only men's single skater who has ever completed the Super Slam.

#	Skater	Nation	OG	WC	GPF	EC	4CC	JWC	JGPF
1	Yuzuru Hanyu	JPN	2014	2014	2013		**2020**	2010	2009

Two men's single skaters have won one major junior-level international competitions (JWC) and all four major senior-level international competitions (OG, WC, GPF, and EC), but the Junior Grand Prix Final (JGPF) did not exist when they were juniors.

#	Skater	Nation	OG	WC	GPF	EC	4CC	JWC	JGPF
1	Alexei Yagudin	RUS	**2002**	1998	1999	1998		1995	Did not exist
2	Evgeni Plushenko	RUS	**2006**	2001	2000	2000		1996	Did not exist

=== Women's singles ===
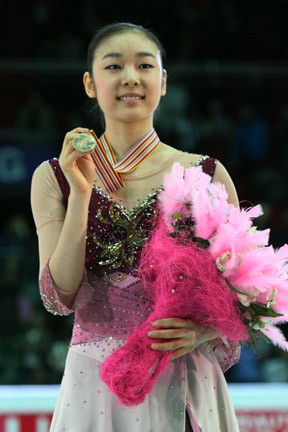
(South Korea) Yuna Kim

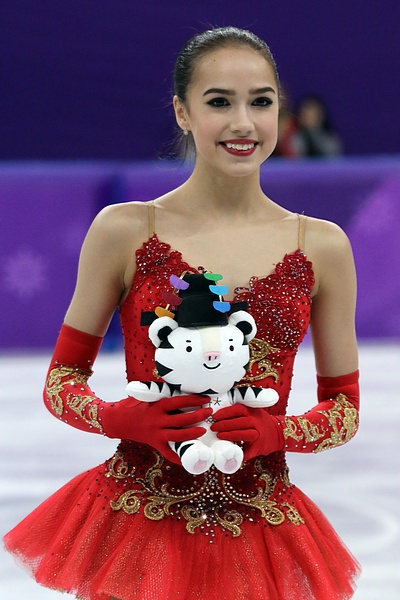
(Russia) Alina Zagitova

Two women's single skaters have completed the Super Slam.

#	Skater	Nation	OG	WC	GPF	EC	4CC	JWC	JGPF
1	Yuna Kim	KOR	**2010**	2009	2006		2009	2006	2005
2	Alina Zagitova	RUS	2018	**2019**	2017	2018		2017	2016

=== Pairs ===
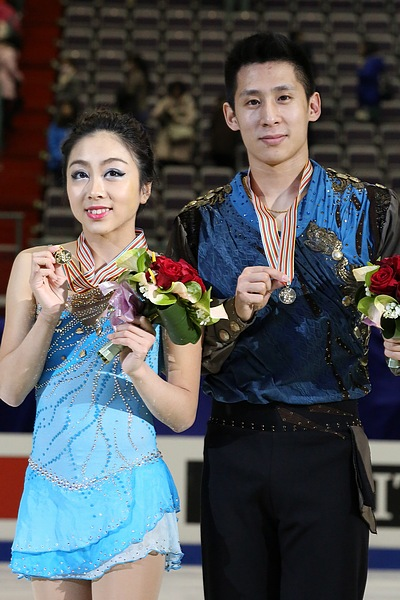
(China) Sui Wenjing / Han Cong

One pairs team and two pairs skaters have completed the Super Slam.

#	Skater	Nation	OG	WC	GPF	EC	4CC	JWC	JGPF
1	Maxim Trankov (Note: Maxim Trankov teamed up with Maria Mukhortova from 2003 to 2010. He then teamed up with Tatiana Volosozhar from 2010.)	RUS	**2014**	2013	2012	2012		2005	2004
2	Aliona Savchenko	GER	**2018**	2008	2007	2007		2000	1999
3	Sui Wenjing / Han Cong	CHN	**2022**	2017	2019		2012	2010	2009

One pairs skater has won one major junior-level international competition (JWC) and all four major senior-level international competitions (OG, WC, GPF, and EC), but the Junior Grand Prix Final (JGPF) did not exist when he was a junior skater.

#	Skater	Nation	OG	WC	GPF	EC	4CC	JWC	JGPF
1	Anton Sikharulidze (Note: Anton Sikharulidze teamed up with Maria Petrova from 1991 to 1996. He then teamed up with Elena Berezhnaya from 1996 to 2002.)	RUS	**2002**	1998	1997	1998		1993	Did not exist

Only one pairs skater has won all major junior and senior level competitions and the Olympic Team event.

#	Skater	Nation	OG Team	WC	GPF	EC	4CC	JWC	JGPF
1	Maxim Trankov	RUS	**2014 T**^{*}	2013	2012	2012		2005	2004

^{*}The team event at the Olympics is indicated by "T".

=== Ice dance ===
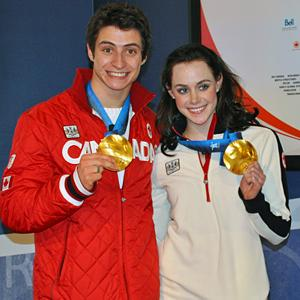
(Canada) Tessa Virtue / Scott Moir

One ice dance team have completed the Super Slam.

#	Skater	Nation	OG	WC	GPF	EC	4CC	JWC	JGPF
1	Tessa Virtue / Scott Moir	CAN	2010	2010	**2016**		2008	2006	2005

Four ice dancers have won one major junior-level international competitions (JWC) and all four major senior-level international competitions (OG, WC, GPF, and EC), but the Junior Grand Prix Final (JGPF) did not exist when they were juniors.

#	Skater	Nation	OG	WC	GPF	EC	4CC	JWC	JGPF
1	Oksana Grishuk (Note: Oksana Grishuk teamed up with Alexandr Chichkov from 1986 to 1989. She then teamed up with Evgeni Platov from 1989 to 1998.)	RUS	1994	1994	**1996**	1996		1987	Did not exist
2	Evgeni Platov (Note: Evgeni Platov teamed up with Elena Krykanova from 1983 to 1986, teamed up with Larisa Fedorinova from 1986 to 1989, and teamed up with Oksana Grishuk from 1989 to 1998.)	RUS	1994	1994	**1996**	1996		1983	Did not exist
3	Marina Anissina (Note: Marina Anissina teamed up with Ilia Averbukh for Russia and the Soviet Union from 1989 to 1992. She then teamed up with Gwendal Peizerat for France from 1993 to 2002.)	FRA	**2002**	2000	2000	2000		1989	Did not exist
4	Roman Kostomarov (Note: Roman Kostomarov teamed up with Ekaterina Davydova from 1992 to 1998, teamed up with Tatiana Navka from 1998 to 1999, teamed up with Anna Semenovich from 1999 to 2000, and teamed up with Tatiana Navka from 2000 to 2006.)	RUS	**2006**	2004	2003	2004		1995	Did not exist

One ice dance team and one ice dancer have won all major junior and senior level competitions and the Olympic Team event.

#	Skater	Nation	OG Team	WC	GPF	EC	4CC	JWC	JGPF
1	Tessa Virtue / Scott Moir	CAN	**2018 T**^{*}	2010	2016		2008	2006	2005
2	Madison Chock	USA	2022 T^{*}	2023	**2023**		2019	2009	2008

^{*}The team event at the Olympics is indicated by "T".

=== All disciplines ===
Chronological

To date, only one men's single skater, two women's singles skaters, four pair skaters (including one pair team), and three ice dancers (including one ice dance team), have completed the Super Slam. Of these skaters, only one men's singles skater, two women's skaters, four pairs skaters (including one pair team), one ice dance team have won all major junior and senior level competitions and the Olympic gold medal in the individual event; only one pairs skater and three ice dancers (including one ice dance team) have won all major junior and senior level competitions and the Olympic medal in the team events.

#	Skater	Nation	Discipline	OG	WC	GPF	EC	4CC	JWC	JGPF
1	Yuna Kim	KOR	Women's singles	**2010**	2009	2006		2009	2006	2005
2	Maxim Trankov	RUS	Pairs	**2014**	2013	2012	2012		2005	2004
3	Tessa Virtue / Scott Moir	CAN	Ice dance	2010	2010	**2016**		2008	2006	2005
4	Aliona Savchenko	GER	Pairs	**2018**	2008	2007	2007		2000	1999
5	Alina Zagitova	RUS	Women's singles	2018	**2019**	2017	2018		2017	2016
6	Yuzuru Hanyu	JPN	Men's singles	2014	2014	2013		**2020**	2010	2009
7	Sui Wenjing / Han Cong	CHN	Pairs	**2022**	2017	2019		2012	2010	2009

#	Skater	Nation	Discipline	OG Team	WC	GPF	EC	4CC	JWC	JGPF
1	Maxim Trankov	RUS	Pairs	**2014 T**^{*}	2013	2012	2012		2005	2004
2	Tessa Virtue / Scott Moir	CAN	Ice dance	**2018 T**^{*}	2010	2016		2008	2006	2005
3	Madison Chock	USA	Ice dance	2022 T^{*}	2023	**2023**		2019	2009	2008

^{*}The team event at the Olympics is indicated by "T".

Totals by nation

The following table shows the numbers of Super Slams by nation.

#	Nation	Super Slams				
#	Nation	Men's singles	Women's singles	Pairs	Ice dance	Total
1	CAN	0	0	0	2	2
1	CHN	0	0	2	0	2
3	RUS	0	1	0.5	0	1.5
4	JPN	1	0	0	0	1
4	KOR	0	1	0	0	1
6	GER	0	0	0.5	0	0.5
Total		1	2	3	2	8

== See also ==
Major senior events

- Figure skating at the Olympic Games
  - List of Olympic medalists in figure skating
- ISU World Figure Skating Championships
  - World Figure Skating Championships cumulative medal count
- ISU European Figure Skating Championships
  - All-time European Figure Skating Championships medal table
- ISU Four Continents Figure Skating Championships
  - Four Continents Figure Skating Championships cumulative medal count
- ISU Grand Prix of Figure Skating Final

Major junior events

- ISU World Junior Figure Skating Championships
- ISU Junior Grand Prix of Figure Skating Final

World rankings

- ISU World Standings
- ISU Season's World Ranking
