= Four Continents Figure Skating Championships cumulative medal count =

Figure skating records and statistics

Medal records
- Olympic Games; World Championships; European Championships; Four Continents Championships; Grand Prix of Figure Skating
- Other events: Grand Slam; Junior Grand Slam; Golden Slam; Junior Golden Slam; Super Slam

Highest scores statistics
- Current senior; Current junior; Historical senior; Historical junior

Rankings (current and statistics)
- World Standings; Season's World Ranking

The Four Continents Figure Skating Championships are an annual figure skating competition sanctioned by the International Skating Union (ISU). Medals are awarded in men's singles, women's singles, pair skating, and ice dance. The inaugural Four Continents Championships were held in 1999 in Halifax, Canada. Only eligible skaters from ISU member countries in Africa, Asia, North America, Oceania, and South America are allowed to compete. Patrick Chan of Canada holds the record for winning the most gold medals at the Four Continents Championships in men's singles (with three), while Mao Asada and Fumie Suguri of Japan are tied for winning the most gold medals in women's singles (with three each). Sui Wenjing and Han Cong of China hold the record in pair skating (with six). Five teams are tied for winning the most gold medals in ice dance (with three each): Tanith Belbin and Benjamin Agosto of the United States, Shae-Lynn Bourne and Victor Kraatz of Canada, Madison Chock and Evan Bates of the United States, Meryl Davis and Charlie White of the United States, and Tessa Virtue and Scott Moir of Canada.

== Men's singles ==
Patrick Chan of Canada has won the most gold medals in the men's singles (with three). No one men's singles skater won back-to-back titles. Li Chengjiang of China and Evan Lysacek of the United States share the record for the most total medals (with five medals each). Li is also tied with Yuzuru Hanyu of Japan for winning the most silver medals (with three each), while Yan Han of China holds the record for winning the most bronze medals (with three).

=== Total medal count by nation ===
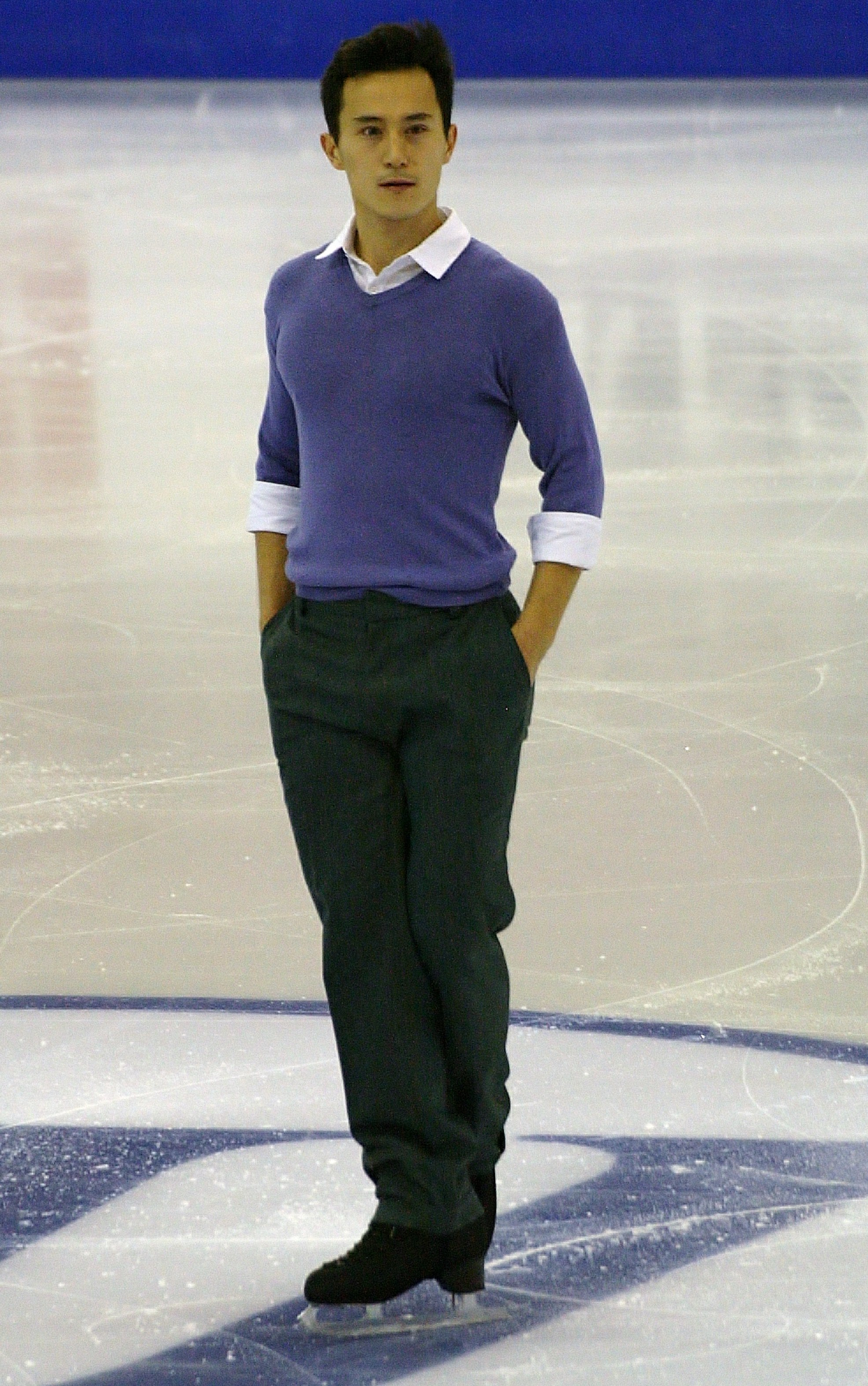
Patrick Chan of Canada won a record three gold medals in men's singles at the Four Continents Championships.

Number of Four Continents Championship medals in men's singles by nation
Rank	Nation	Gold	Silver	Bronze	Total
1	Japan	11	11	7	29
2	Canada	7	5	2	14
3	United States	4	3	10	17
4	China	2	6	7	15
5	Kazakhstan	2	0	0	2
6	South Korea	1	2	1	4
Totals (6 entries)		27	27	27	81

=== Most gold medals by skater ===
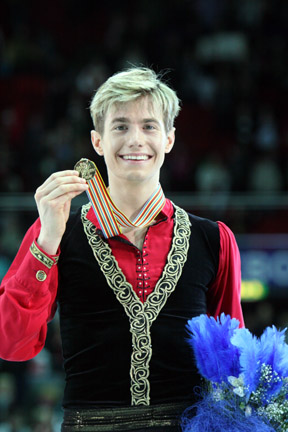
Jeffrey Buttle of Canada won two gold medals and two silver medals at the Four Continents Championships.

- If the number of gold medals is identical, the silver and bronze medals are used as tie-breakers (in that order). If all numbers are the same, the skaters receive the same placement and are sorted in alphabetical order.
- The table only shows the period from the first to the last medals won, not all participation at the Four Continents Championships.

Top 10 ranking of men's singles skaters by the most gold medals won at the Four Continents Championships
No.	Skater	Nation	Period	Gold medal – first place	Silver medal – second place	Bronze medal – third place	Total	Ref.
1	Patrick Chan	Canada	2009–2016	3	–	–	3	
2	Jeffrey Buttle	Canada	2002–2008	2	2	–	4	
2	Takeshi Honda	Japan	1999–2003	2	2	–	4	
4	Evan Lysacek	United States	2004–2009	2	1	2	5	
5	Daisuke Takahashi	Japan	2005–2012	2	1	1	4	
6	Kao Miura	Japan	2022–2026	2	–	1	3	
7	Li Chengjiang	China	1999–2005	1	3	1	5	
8	Yuzuru Hanyu	Japan	2011–2020	1	3	–	4	
9	Cha Jun-hwan	South Korea	2022–2026	1	2	1	4	
10	Jin Boyang	China	2016–2019	1	2	–	3	

=== Most medals by skater ===
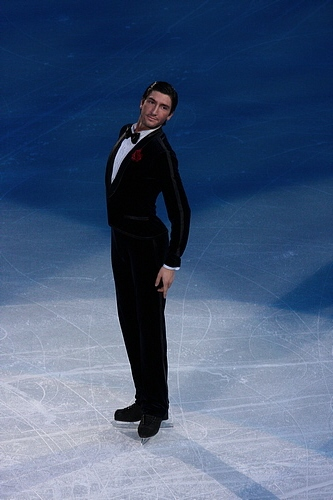
Evan Lysacek of the United States shares the record for the most total medals won at the Four Continents Championships (with five).

- If the total number of medals is identical, the gold, silver and bronze medals are used as tie-breakers (in that order). If all numbers are the same, the skaters receive the same placement and are sorted in alphabetical order.
- The table only shows the period from the first to the last medals won, not all participation at the Four Continents Championships.

Top 10 ranking of men's singles skaters by the most medals won at the Four Continents Championships
No.	Skater	Nation	Period	Gold medal – first place	Silver medal – second place	Bronze medal – third place	Total	Ref.
1	Evan Lysacek	United States	2004–2009	2	1	2	5	
2	Li Chengjiang	China	1999–2005	1	3	1	5	
3	Jeffrey Buttle	Canada	2002–2008	2	2	–	4	
3	Takeshi Honda	Japan	1999–2003	2	2	–	4	
5	Daisuke Takahashi	Japan	2005–2012	2	1	1	4	
6	Yuzuru Hanyu	Japan	2011–2020	1	3	–	4	
7	Cha Jun-hwan	South Korea	2022–2026	1	2	1	4	
8	Patrick Chan	Canada	2009–2016	3	–	–	3	
9	Kao Miura	Japan	2022–2026	2	–	1	3	
10	Jin Boyang	China	2016–2019	1	2	–	3	

== Women's singles ==
Mao Asada and Fumie Suguri of Japan share the record for the most gold medals won (with three each). Rika Kihira of Japan is the only skater to have won two back-to-back titles in women's singles. Mao Asada holds the record for the most total medals won (with six). Five skaters share the record for the most silver medals won (with two each): Joannie Rochette of Canada; and Shizuka Arakawa, Mao Asada, Satoko Miyahara, and Akiko Suzuki, who all competed for Japan. Five skaters share the record for the most bronze medals won (with two each): Mone Chiba, Rika Hongo, and Yoshie Onda, who all competed for Japan; and Mirai Nagasu and Caroline Zhang, who both competed for the United States.

=== Total medal count by nation ===
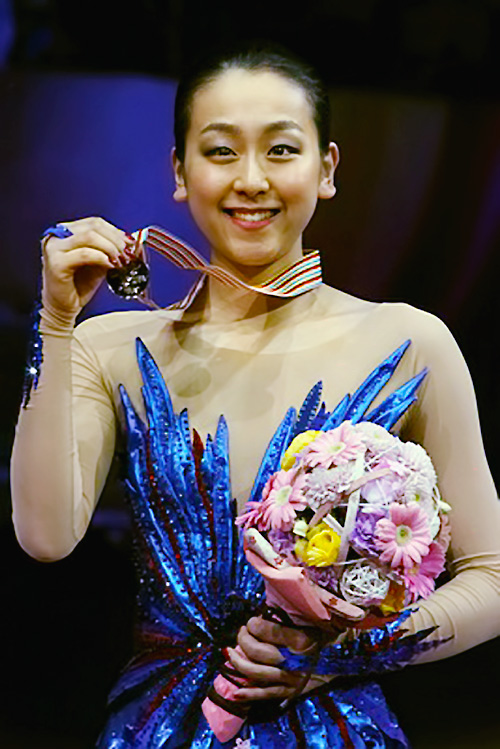
With three gold medals and six medals in total, Mao Asada of Japan is the most successful figure skater in the women's event at the Four Continents Championships.

Number of Four Continents Championship medals in women's singles by nation
Rank	Nation	Gold	Silver	Bronze	Total
1	Japan	17	12	13	42
2	United States	6	6	10	22
3	South Korea	3	4	1	8
4	Uzbekistan	1	0	0	1
5	Canada	0	4	2	6
6	Kazakhstan	0	1	0	1
7	China	0	0	1	1
Totals (7 entries)		27	27	27	81

=== Most gold medals by skater ===
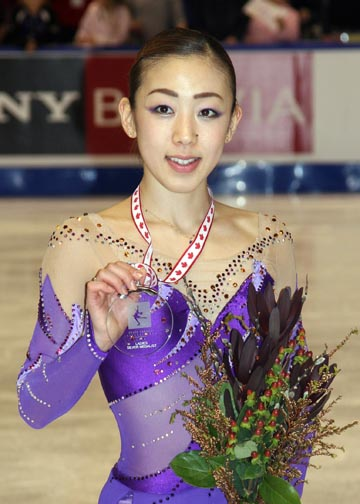
Fumie Suguri of Japan shares the record for the winning the most gold medals at the Four Continents Championships (with three).

- If the number of gold medals is identical, the silver and bronze medals are used as tie-breakers (in that order). If all numbers are the same, the skaters receive the same placement and are sorted in alphabetical order.
- The table only shows the period from the first to the last medals won, not all participation at the Four Continents Championships.

Top 10 ranking of women's singles skaters by the most gold medals won at the Four Continents Championships
No.	Skater	Nation	Period	Gold medal – first place	Silver medal – second place	Bronze medal – third place	Total	Ref.
1	Mao Asada	Japan	2008–2013	3	2	1	6	
2	Fumie Suguri	Japan	2001–2005	3	–	–	3	
3	Mai Mihara	Japan	2017–2022	2	1	1	4	
4	Rika Kihira	Japan	2019–2020	2	–	–	2	
5	Satoko Miyahara	Japan	2014–2018	1	2	1	4	
6	Angela Nikodinov	United States	1999–2001	1	1	1	3	
7	Kim Chae-yeon	South Korea	2024–2025	1	1	–	2	
7	Lee Hae-in	South Korea	2022–2023	1	1	–	2	
9	Mone Chiba	Japan	2023–2026	1	–	2	3	
10	Miki Ando	Japan	2008–2011	1	–	1	2	
10	Jennifer Kirk	United States	2002–2005	1	–	1	2	
10	Kanako Murakami	Japan	2013–2014	1	–	1	2	

=== Most medals by skater ===
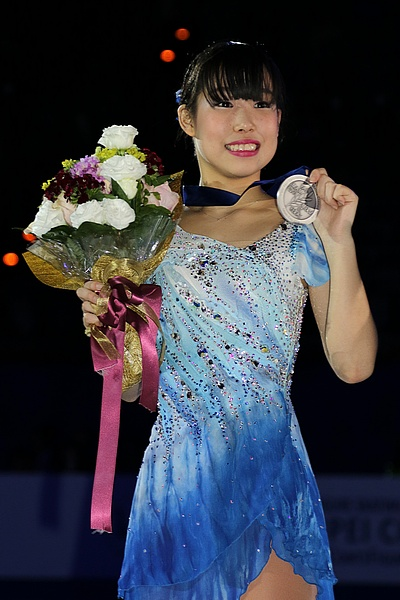
Mai Mihara of Japan won two gold medals and four total medals at the Four Continents Championships.

- If the total number of medals is identical, the gold, silver and bronze medals are used as tie-breakers (in that order). If all numbers are the same, the skaters receive the same placement and are sorted in alphabetical order.
- The table only shows the period from the first to the last medals won, not all participation at the Four Continents Championships.

Top 10 ranking of women's singles skaters by the most medals won at the Four Continents Championships
No.	Skater	Nation	Period	Gold medal – first place	Silver medal – second place	Bronze medal – third place	Total	Ref.
1	Mao Asada	Japan	2008–2013	3	2	1	6	
2	Mai Mihara	Japan	2017–2022	2	1	1	4	
3	Satoko Miyahara	Japan	2014–2018	1	2	1	4	
4	Fumie Suguri	Japan	2001–2005	3	–	–	3	
5	Angela Nikodinov	United States	1999–2001	1	1	1	3	
6	Mone Chiba	Japan	2023–2026	1	–	2	3	
7	Joannie Rochette	Canada	2007–2009	–	2	1	3	
8	Mirai Nagasu	United States	2011–2017	–	1	2	3	
8	Yoshie Onda	Japan	2001–2005	–	1	2	3	
10	Rika Kihira	Japan	2019–2020	2	–	–	2	

== Pairs ==
Sui Wenjing and Han Cong from China hold the record for the most gold medals won (with six). Three pairs share the record for the longest winning streak at back-to-back events (with two consecutive titles each): Jamie Salé and David Pelletier from Canada; Pang Qing and Tong Jian, and Sui Wenjing and Han Cong, who competed for China. The record for total medals won is held by Pang Qing and Tong Jian with nine medals. Pang Qing and Tong Jian also hold the record for the most silver medals won, with three. Zhang Hao from China also won three silver medals, but with different partners. The record for the most bronze medals is held by Chinese pair Zhang Dan and Zhang Hao (three).

=== Total medal count by nation ===
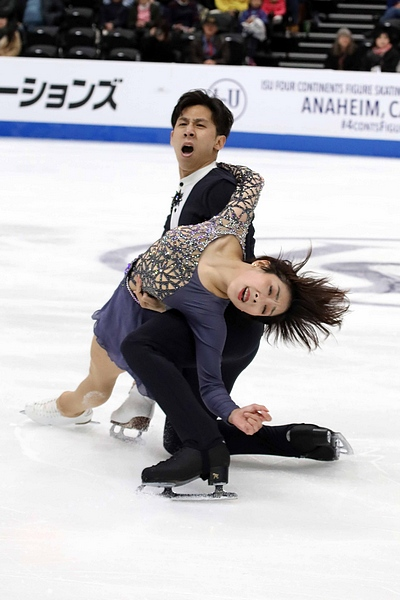
Sui Wenjing and Han Cong of China have won a record six gold medals in pair skating at the Four Continents Championships.

Number of Four Continents Championship medals in pair skating by nation
Rank	Nation	Gold	Silver	Bronze	Total
1	China	16	9	6	31
2	Canada	5	9	9	23
3	United States	4	8	10	22
4	Japan	2	1	1	4
5	North Korea	0	0	1	1
Totals (5 entries)		27	27	27	81

=== Most gold medals by pairs team ===
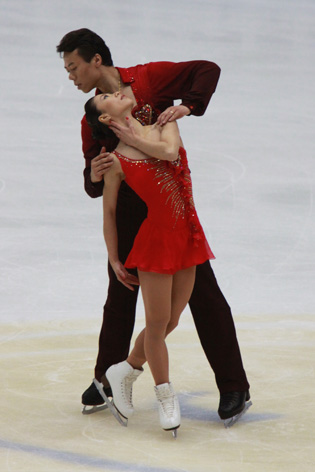
Shen Xue and Zhao Hongbo of China have won three gold medals and one silver medal in pair skating at the Four Continents Championships.

- Only team results are included in the list. Individual results in case of partner changes are marked with a note or listed separately below the table.
- If the number of gold medals is identical, the silver and bronze medals are used as tie-breakers (in that order).
- The table only shows the period from the first to the last medals won, not all participation at the Four Continents Championships.

Top 10 ranking of pairs skaters by the most gold medals won at the Four Continents Championships
No.	Female partner	Male partner	Nation	Period	Gold medal – first place	Silver medal – second place	Bronze medal – third place	Total	Ref.
1	Sui Wenjing	Han Cong	China	2012–2026	6	1	–	7	
2	Pang Qing	Tong Jian	China	2002–2015	5	3	1	9	
3	Shen Xue	Zhao Hongbo	China	1999–2007	3	1	–	4	
4	Zhang Dan	Zhang Hao (Note: Zhang Hao won another silver medal with Peng Cheng (2015), earning eight Four Continents Championships medals in total.)	China	2002–2010	2	2	3	7	
5	Meagan Duhamel (Note: Meagan Duhamel won another bronze medal with Craig Buntin (2010), earning five Four Continents Championships medals in total.)	Eric Radford	Canada	2011–2017	2	2	–	4	
6	Riku Miura	Ryuichi Kihara	Japan	2023–2025	2	1	–	3	
7	Jamie Salé	David Pelletier	Canada	2000–2001	2	–	–	2	
8	Deanna Stellato-Dudek	Maxime Deschamps	Canada	2023–2025	1	1	1	3	
9	Tarah Kayne	Danny O'Shea (Note: Danny O'Shea won another bronze medal with Ellie Kam (2024), earning three Four Continents Championships medals in total.)	United States	2014–2018	1	1	–	2	
10	Rena Inoue	John Baldwin	United States	2006–2007	1	–	1	2	

Notes

One skater won two gold medals in the pairs event, but with different partners:

- Misha Mitrofanov from the United States won one gold medal while partnered with Audrey Lu (2022) and another gold medal while partnered with Alisa Efimova (2026).

=== Most total medals by pairs team ===
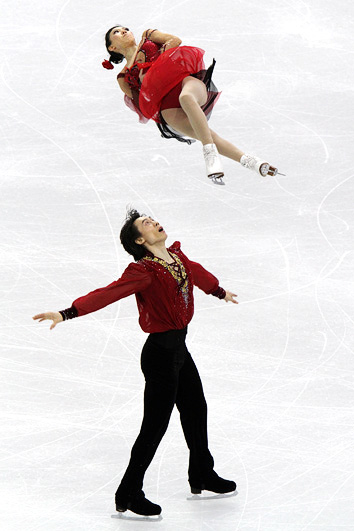
Pang Qing and Tong Jian of China won a record nine total medals in pair skating at the Four Continents Championships.

- Only team results are included in the list. Individual results in case of partner changes are marked with a note or listed separately below the table.
- If the total number of medals is identical, the gold, silver and bronze medals are used as tie-breakers (in that order).
- The table only shows the period from the first to the last medals won, not all participation at the Four Continents Championships.

Top 10 ranking of pairs skaters by the most medals won at the Four Continents Championships
No.	Female partner	Male partner	Nation	Period	Gold medal – first place	Silver medal – second place	Bronze medal – third place	Total	Ref.
1	Pang Qing	Tong Jian	China	2002–2015	5	3	1	9	
2	Sui Wenjing	Han Cong	China	2012–2026	6	1	–	7	
3	Zhang Dan	Zhang Hao (Note: Zhang Hao won another silver medal with Peng Cheng (2015), earning eight Four Continents Championships medals in total.)	China	2002–2010	2	2	3	7	
4	Shen Xue	Zhao Hongbo	China	1999–2007	3	1	–	4	
5	Meagan Duhamel (Note: Meagan Duhamel won another bronze medal with Craig Buntin (2010), earning five Four Continents Championships medals in total.)	Eric Radford	Canada	2011–2017	2	2	–	4	
6	Riku Miura	Ryuichi Kihara	Japan	2023–2025	2	1	–	3	
7	Deanna Stellato-Dudek	Maxime Deschamps	Canada	2023–2025	1	1	1	3	
8	Jamie Salé	David Pelletier	Canada	2000–2001	2	–	–	2	
9	Tarah Kayne	Danny O'Shea (Note: Danny O'Shea won another bronze medal with Ellie Kam (2024), earning three Four Continents Championships medals in total.)	United States	2014–2018	1	1	–	2	
10	Rena Inoue	John Baldwin	United States	2006–2007	1	–	1	2	

Notes

Three more skaters won a total of three medals in the pairs event, but with different partners:

- Kirsten Moore-Towers from Canada won two silver medals and one bronze medal: one silver medal partnered with Dylan Moscovitch (2013) and another silver medal and one bronze medal partnered with Michael Marinaro (2019–2020).
- Peng Cheng from China won two silver medals and one bronze medal: one silver medal partnered with Zhang Hao (2015) and another silver medal and one bronze medal partnered with Jin Yang (2019–2020).
- Jin Yang from China won one silver medal and two bronze medals: one bronze medal partnered with Yu Xiaoyu (2016) and another silver medal and one bronze medal partnered with Jin Yang (2019–2020).

== Ice dance ==
The record for gold medals won is shared by five ice dance teams (with three each): Shae-Lynn Bourne and Victor Kraatz from Canada, Tanith Belbin and Benjamin Agosto from the United States, Meryl Davis and Charlie White from the United States, Tessa Virtue and Scott Moir from Canada, and Madison Chock and Evan Bates from the United States. Tanith Belbin and Benjamin Agosto hold the longest winning streak at back-to-back events with three. The record for total medals won is held by Madison Chock and Evan Bates with eight medals. Bates won another medal with his previous partner Emily Samuelson and thus holds the record for the most total medals won by a skater in ice dance (with nine). Two ice dance teams share the record for the most silver medals won (three each): Tanith Belbin and Benjamin Agosto, and Madison Chock and Evan Bates, who all competed for the United States. Seven ice dance teams share the record for the most bronze medals won (with two each): Naomi Lang and Peter Tchernyshev from the United States, Megan Wing and Aaron Lowe from Canada, Tessa Virtue and Scott Moir, Kaitlyn Weaver and Andrew Poje from Canada, Madison Chock and Evan Bates, Christina Carreira and Anthony Ponomarenko from the United States, and Marjorie Lajoie and Zachary Lagha from Canada. Evan Bates won another bronze medal with Emily Samuelson and thus holds the record for the most bronze medals won by a skater in ice dance (with three).

=== Total medal count by nation ===
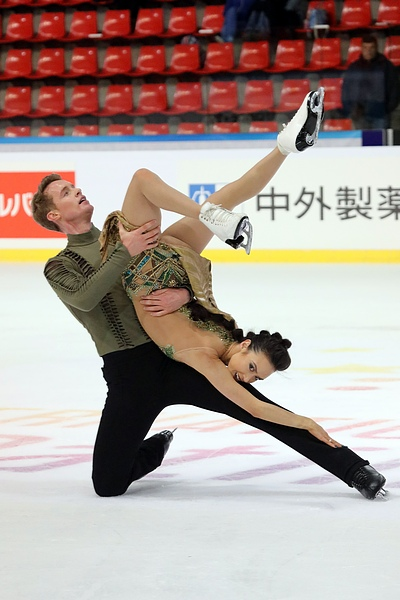
With three gold medals and eight total medals, Evan Bates and Madison Chock of the United States are the most successful ice dance team at the Four Continents Championships.

Number of Four Continents Championship medals in ice dance by nation
Rank	Nation	Gold	Silver	Bronze	Total
1	United States	16	14	15	45
2	Canada	11	12	11	34
3	Japan	0	1	1	2
Totals (3 entries)		27	27	27	81

=== Most gold medals by ice dance team ===
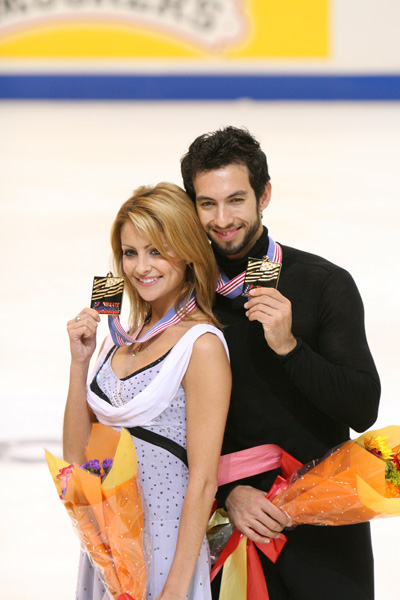
Tanith Belbin and Benjamin Agosto of the United States won three gold medals and three silver medals in ice dance at the Four Continents Championships.

- Only team results are included in the list. Individual results in case of partner changes are marked with a note or listed separately below the table.
- If the number of gold medals is identical, the silver and bronze medals are used as tie-breakers (in that order). If all numbers are the same, the teams receive the same placement and are sorted in alphabetical order by the female partner's last name.
- The table only shows the period from the first to the last medals won, not all participation at the Four Continents Championships.

Top 10 ranking of ice dance teams by the most gold medals won at the Four Continents Championships
No.	Female partner	Male partner	Nation	Period	Gold medal – first place	Silver medal – second place	Bronze medal – third place	Total	Ref.
1	Madison Chock	Evan Bates (Note: Evan Bates won another bronze medal with Emily Samuelson (2009), earning nine Four Continents Championships medals in total.)	United States	2013–2025	3	3	2	8	
2	Tanith Belbin	Benjamin Agosto	United States	2002–2007	3	3	–	6	
3	Tessa Virtue	Scott Moir	Canada	2006–2017	3	2	2	7	
4	Meryl Davis	Charlie White	United States	2008–2013	3	2	–	5	
5	Shae-Lynn Bourne	Victor Kraatz	Canada	1999–2003	3	–	–	3	
6	Piper Gilles	Paul Poirier (Note: Paul Poirier won another bronze medal with Vanessa Crone (2011), earning six Four Continents Championships medals in total.)	Canada	2014–2025	2	2	1	5	
7	Naomi Lang	Peter Tchernyshev	United States	1999–2003	2	1	2	5	
7	Kaitlyn Weaver	Andrew Poje	Canada	2010–2019	2	1	2	5	
9	Marie-France Dubreuil	Patrice Lauzon	Canada	2000–2007	1	2	1	4	
9	Maia Shibutani	Alex Shibutani	United States	2011–2017	1	2	1	4	

=== Most total medals by ice dance team ===
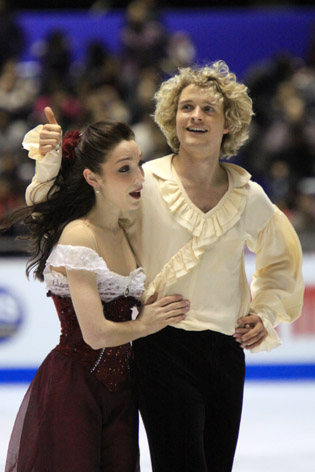
Meryl Davis and Charlie White of the United States share the record for the most gold medals won in ice dance team at the Four Continents Championships (with three).

- Only team results are included in the list. Individual results in the case of partner changes are listed separately below the table.
- If the total number of medals is identical, the gold, silver and bronze medals are used as tie-breakers (in that order). If all numbers are the same, the teams receive the same placement and are sorted in alphabetical order by the female partner's last name.
- The table only shows the period from the first to the last medals won, not all participation at the Four Continents Championships.

Top 10 ranking of ice dance teams by the most medals won at the Four Continents Championships
No.	Female partner	Male partner	Nation	Period	Gold medal – first place	Silver medal – second place	Bronze medal – third place	Total	Ref.
1	Madison Chock	Evan Bates (Note: Evan Bates won another bronze medal with Emily Samuelson (2009), earning nine Four Continents Championships medals in total.)	United States	2013–2025	3	3	2	8	
2	Tessa Virtue	Scott Moir	Canada	2006–2017	3	2	2	7	
3	Tanith Belbin	Benjamin Agosto	United States	2002–2007	3	3	–	6	
4	Meryl Davis	Charlie White	United States	2008–2013	3	2	–	5	
5	Piper Gilles	Paul Poirier (Note: Paul Poirier won another bronze medal with Vanessa Crone (2011), earning six Four Continents Championships medals in total.)	Canada	2014–2025	2	2	1	5	
6	Naomi Lang	Peter Tchernyshev	United States	1999–2003	2	1	2	5	
6	Kaitlyn Weaver	Andrew Poje	Canada	2010–2019	2	1	2	5	
8	Marie-France Dubreuil	Patrice Lauzon	Canada	2000–2007	1	2	1	4	
8	Maia Shibutani	Alex Shibutani	United States	2011–2017	1	2	1	4	
10	Shae-Lynn Bourne	Victor Kraatz	Canada	1999–2003	3	–	–	3	

== Overall ==
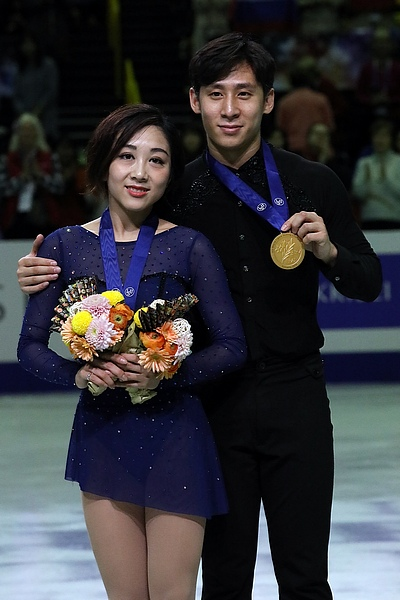
Pair skaters Sui Wenjing and Han Cong of China have won a record six gold medals at the Four Continents Championships.

- The table only shows the period from the first to the last medals won, not all participation at the Four Continents Championships.

Medals records across all four disciplines at the Four Continents Figure Skating Championships
Achievement	Record	Skater	Nation	Discipline	Period	Ref.
Most gold medals	6	Han Cong	China	Pairs	2012–2020	
Most gold medals	6	Sui Wenjing	China	Pairs	2012–2020	
Most silver medals	3	Li Chengjiang	China	Men's singles	1999–2005	
Most silver medals	3	Benjamin Agosto	United States	Ice dance	2002–2007	
Most silver medals	3	Tanith Belbin	United States	Ice dance	2002–2007	
Most silver medals	3	Pang Qing	China	Pairs	2003–2007	
Most silver medals	3	Tong Jian	China	Pairs	2003–2007	
Most silver medals	3	Zhang Hao	China	Pairs	2004–2015	
Most silver medals	3	Yuzuru Hanyu	Japan	Men's singles	2011–2017	
Most silver medals	3	Evan Bates	United States	Ice dance	2015–2025	
Most silver medals	3	Madison Chock	United States	Ice dance	2015–2025	
Most bronze medals	3	Zhang Dan	China	Pairs	2002–2009	
Most bronze medals	3	Zhang Hao	China	Pairs	2002–2009	
Most bronze medals	3	Yan Han	China	Men's singles	2013–2016	
Most bronze medals	3	Evan Bates	United States	Ice dance	2009–2017	
Most total medals	9	Pang Qing	China	Pairs	2002–2015	
Most total medals	9	Tong Jian	China	Pairs	2002–2015	
Most total medals	9	Evan Bates	United States	Ice dance	2009–2025	
Most wins at back-to-back events	3	Benjamin Agosto	United States	Ice dance	2004–2006	
Most wins at back-to-back events	3	Tanith Belbin	United States	Ice dance	2004–2006	

=== Total medal count by nation ===
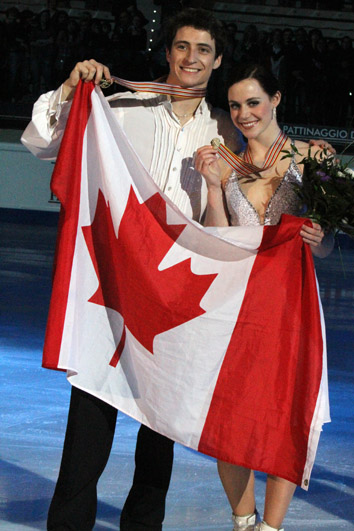
Tessa Virtue and Scott Moir of Canada won three gold medals and seven total medals at the Four Continents Championships.

Total number of Four Continents Championship medals by nation
Rank	Nation	Gold	Silver	Bronze	Total
1	United States	30	31	45	106
2	Japan	30	25	22	77
3	Canada	23	30	24	77
4	China	18	15	14	47
5	South Korea	4	6	2	12
6	Kazakhstan	2	1	0	3
7	Uzbekistan	1	0	0	1
8	North Korea	0	0	1	1
Totals (8 entries)		108	108	108	324

=== Most gold medals by skater ===
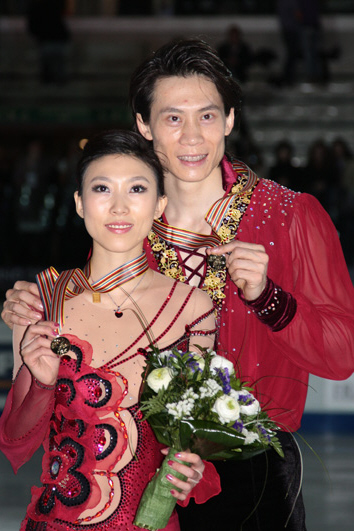
Pair skaters Tong Jian and Pang Qing of China won a record nine total medals at the Four Continents Championships.

- If the number of gold medals is identical, the silver and bronze medals are used as tie-breakers (in that order). If all numbers are the same, the skaters receive the same placement and are sorted in alphabetical order.
- The table only shows the period from the first to the last medals won, not all participation at the Four Continents Championships.

Top 10 ranking of skaters by the most gold medals won at the Four Continents Championships
No.	Skater	Nation	Discipline	Period	Gold medal – first place	Silver medal – second place	Bronze medal – third place	Total	Ref.
1	Han Cong	China	Pairs	2012–2026	6	1	–	7	
1	Sui Wenjing	China	Pairs	2012–2026	6	1	–	7	
3	Pang Qing	China	Pairs	2002–2015	5	3	1	9	
3	Tong Jian	China	Pairs	2002–2015	5	3	1	9	
5	Evan Bates	United States	Ice dance	2009–2025	3	3	3	9	
6	Madison Chock	United States	Ice dance	2013–2025	3	3	2	8	
7	Benjamin Agosto	United States	Ice dance	2002–2007	3	3	–	6	
7	Tanith Belbin	United States	Ice dance	2002–2007	3	3	–	6	
9	Scott Moir	Canada	Ice dance	2006–2017	3	2	2	7	
9	Tessa Virtue	Canada	Ice dance	2006–2017	3	2	2	7	

=== Most total medals by skater ===
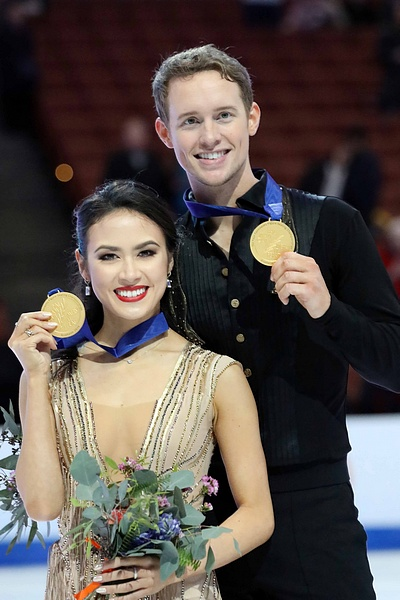
Ice dancer Evan Bates won a record nine total medals at the Four Continents Championships, eight of which were won with Madison Chock.

- If the total number of medals is identical, the gold, silver and bronze medals are used as tie-breakers (in that order). If all numbers are the same, the skaters receive the same placement and are sorted in alphabetical order.
- The table only shows the period from the first to the last medals won, not all participation at the Four Continents Championships.

Top 10 ranking of skaters by the most medals won at the Four Continents Championships
No.	Skater	Nation	Discipline	Period	Gold medal – first place	Silver medal – second place	Bronze medal – third place	Total	Ref.
1	Pang Qing	China	Pairs	2002–2015	5	3	1	9	
1	Tong Jian	China	Pairs	2002–2015	5	3	1	9	
3	Evan Bates	United States	Ice dance	2009–2025	3	3	3	9	
4	Madison Chock	United States	Ice dance	2013–2025	3	3	2	8	
5	Zhang Hao	China	Pairs	2002–2015	2	3	3	8	
6	Han Cong	China	Pairs	2012–2026	6	1	–	7	
6	Sui Wenjing	China	Pairs	2012–2026	6	1	–	7	
8	Scott Moir	Canada	Ice dance	2006–2017	3	2	2	7	
8	Tessa Virtue	Canada	Ice dance	2006–2017	3	2	2	7	
10	Zhang Dan	China	Pairs	2002–2010	2	2	3	7	

== See also ==
- World Figure Skating Championships cumulative medal count
- European Figure Skating Championships cumulative medal count
