= ISU Grand Prix of Figure Skating cumulative medal count =

Figure skating records and statistics

Medal records
- Olympic Games; World Championships; European Championships; Four Continents Championships; Grand Prix of Figure Skating
- Other events: Grand Slam; Junior Grand Slam; Golden Slam; Junior Golden Slam; Super Slam

Highest scores statistics
- Current senior; Current junior; Historical senior; Historical junior

Rankings (current and statistics)
- World Standings; Season's World Ranking

The ISU Grand Prix of Figure Skating – originally known as the Champions Series – is a series of senior-level international figure skating competitions sanctioned by the International Skating Union. This series debuted in 1995, and consists of six qualifying events, held in succession over a span of six weeks, plus the Grand Prix of Figure Skating Final. Currently, Grand Prix events are hosted by Canada (Skate Canada International), China (Cup of China), Finland (Grand Prix of Finland), France (Grand Prix de France), Japan (NHK Trophy), and the United States (Skate America). Previous events were once hosted by Germany (Bofrost Cup on Ice) and Russia (Rostelecom Cup). Medals are awarded in men's singles, women's singles, pair skating, and ice dance; and the top skaters or teams in each discipline are then invited to compete at the Grand Prix of Figure Skating Final.

== History ==
Beginning with the 1995–96 season, the ISU launched the Champions Series – later renamed the Grand Prix Series – which, at its inception, consisted of five qualifying competitions and the Champions Series Final. This allowed skaters to perfect their programs earlier in the season, as well as compete against the skaters whom they would later encounter at the World Championships. This series also provided the viewing public with "additional televised skating," which had been in demand. The five qualifying competitions during the inaugural season were the 1995 Nations Cup, the 1995 NHK Trophy, the 1995 Skate America, the 1995 Skate Canada International, and the 1995 Trophée de France. Skaters earned points based on their results in their respective competitions and the top skaters or teams in each discipline were invited to compete at the Champions Series Final.

== Men's singles ==
=== Total medal count by nation ===
Number of Grand Prix medals in men's singles by nation
Rank	Nation	Gold	Silver	Bronze	Total
1	Japan	59	57	37	153
2	Russia	51	34	33	118
3	United States	43	44	48	135
4	Canada	27	19	14	60
5	France	13	15	20	48
6	Spain	7	5	2	14
7	China	3	12	15	30
8	Switzerland	3	3	3	9
9	Czech Republic	2	5	6	13
10	Ukraine	1	2	2	5
11	Georgia	1	2	1	4
12	Kazakhstan	0	3	3	6
13	Belgium	0	3	0	3
14	Italy	0	2	5	7
15	Israel	0	1	2	3
16	Azerbaijan	0	1	1	2
17	Belarus	0	1	0	1
17	Estonia	0	1	0	1
19	South Korea	0	0	7	7
20	Germany	0	0	4	4
21	Bulgaria	0	0	3	3
22	Denmark	0	0	1	1
22	Hungary	0	0	1	1
22	Romania	0	0	1	1
22	Uzbekistan	0	0	1	1
Totals (25 entries)		210	210	210	630

=== Most gold medals by skater ===
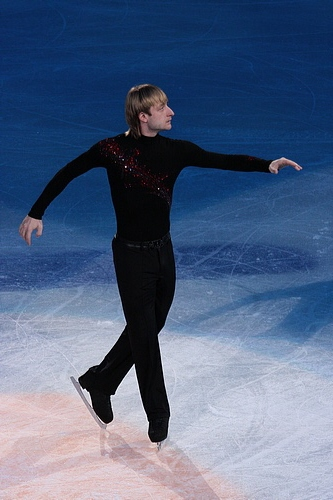
Evgeni Plushenko of Russia has won a record twenty-two total Grand Prix gold medals in the men's event.

- If the number of gold medals is identical, the silver and bronze medals are used as tie-breakers (in that order).

Top 10 men's singles skaters by the most gold medals won at the Grand Prix Series
No.	Skater	Nation	Gold medal – first place	Silver medal – second place	Bronze medal – third place	Total	Ref.
1	Evgeni Plushenko	Russia	22	5	1	28	
2	Patrick Chan	Canada	14	3	2	19	
2	Alexei Yagudin	Russia	14	3	2	19	
4	Yuzuru Hanyu	Japan	12	9	–	21	
5	Nathan Chen	United States	11	2	1	14	
6	Ilia Malinin	United States	10	1	1	12	
7	Shoma Uno	Japan	9	9	2	20	
7	Daisuke Takahashi	Japan	9	7	3	19	
9	Brian Joubert	France	8	3	2	13	
10	Javier Fernández	Spain	7	5	2	14	

== Women's singles ==
=== Total medal count by nation ===
Number of Grand Prix medals in women's singles by nation
Rank	Nation	Gold	Silver	Bronze	Total
1	Russia	70	59	50	179
2	Japan	54	70	56	180
3	United States	44	51	42	137
4	South Korea	11	3	7	21
5	Canada	9	4	12	25
6	Italy	5	8	7	20
7	Ukraine	3	3	5	11
8	Uzbekistan	3	0	3	6
9	Belgium	2	3	4	9
10	China	2	3	2	7
11	Finland	2	1	6	9
12	Germany	2	1	0	3
13	Hungary	1	1	5	7
14	Switzerland	1	1	2	4
15	France	1	0	5	6
16	Austria	0	1	0	1
16	Kazakhstan	0	1	0	1
18	Azerbaijan	0	0	1	1
18	Estonia	0	0	1	1
18	Georgia	0	0	1	1
18	Sweden	0	0	1	1
Totals (21 entries)		210	210	210	630

=== Most gold medals by skater ===
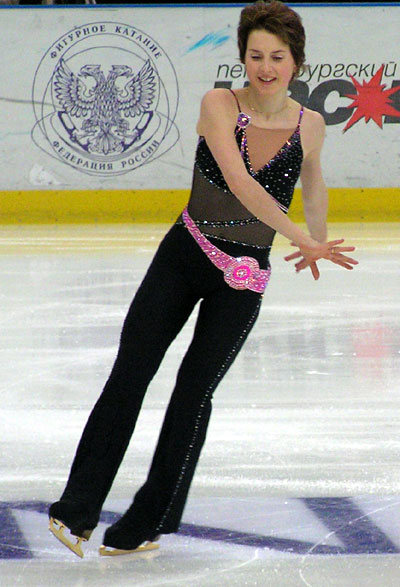
Irina Slutskaya of Russia has won a record seventeen total Grand Prix gold medals in the women's event.

- If the number of gold medals is identical, the silver and bronze medals are used as tie-breakers (in that order).

Top 10 women's singles skaters by the most gold medals won at the Grand Prix Series
No.	Skater	Nation	Gold medal – first place	Silver medal – second place	Bronze medal – third place	Total	Ref.
1	Irina Slutskaya	Russia	17	7	6	30	
2	Mao Asada	Japan	15	6	2	23	
3	Michelle Kwan	United States	13	6	2	21	
4	Maria Butyrskaya	Russia	10	6	3	19	
4	Yuna Kim	South Korea	10	1	1	12	
6	Kaori Sakamoto	Japan	9	4	3	16	
7	Evgenia Medvedeva	Russia	7	2	1	10	
8	Elizaveta Tuktamysheva	Russia	6	4	5	15	
8	Sasha Cohen	United States	6	3	1	10	
10	Carolina Kostner	Italy	5	6	5	16	
10	Miki Ando	Japan	5	6	2	13	
10	Ashley Wagner	United States	5	4	8	17	
10	Alina Zagitova	Russia	5	2	1	8	
10	Joannie Rochette	Canada	5	1	5	11	

== Pairs ==
=== Total medal count by nation ===
Number of Grand Prix medals in pair skating by nation
Rank	Nation	Gold	Silver	Bronze	Total
1	Russia	74	65	50	189
2	China	53	51	32	136
3	Germany	34	12	13	59
4	Canada	24	21	42	87
5	Japan	7	5	2	14
6	France	6	8	6	20
7	United States	4	27	33	64
8	Italy	4	10	10	24
9	Georgia	2	1	2	5
10	Latvia	1	0	2	3
11	Hungary	0	3	2	5
12	Poland	0	2	11	13
13	Ukraine	0	2	3	5
14	Kazakhstan	0	1	0	1
14	Uzbekistan	0	1	0	1
16	Australia	0	0	1	1
Totals (16 entries)		209	209	209	627

=== Most gold medals by pairs team ===
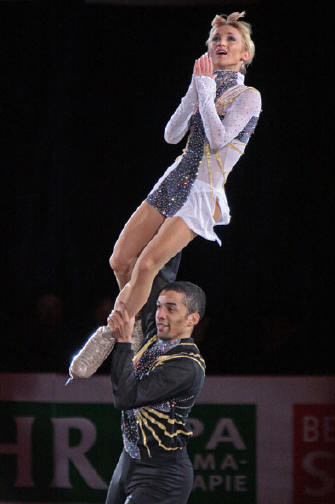
Aljona Savchenko of Germany has won a record twenty-two Grand Prix gold medals in the pairs event, eighteen of which were with Robin Szolkowy.

- Only pair results are included in the list. Individual results in case of partner changes are marked with a note or listed separately below the table.
- If the number of gold medals is identical, the silver and bronze medals are used as tie-breakers (in that order). If all numbers are the same, the pairs receive the same placement and are sorted in alphabetical order by the female partner's last name.

Top ranking of pairs teams by gold medals won at the Grand Prix Series
No.	Female partner	Male partner	Nation	Gold medal – first place	Silver medal – second place	Bronze medal – third place	Total	Ref.
1	Shen Xue	Zhao Hongbo	China	22	7	4	33	
2	Aljona Savchenko (Note: Aljona Savchenko won another four gold medals and two silver medals while competing with Bruno Massot.)	Robin Szolkowy	Germany	18	3	7	28	
3	Pang Qing	Tong Jian	China	10	13	8	31	
3	Zhang Dan	Zhang Hao (Note: Zhang Hao won another gold medal, one silver medal, and three bronze medals while competing with Peng Cheng; and another gold medal and four silver medals while competing with Yu Xiaoyu.)	China	10	8	4	22	
3	Elena Berezhnaya (Note: Elena Berezhnaya won another gold medal, two silver medals, and two bronze medals while competing with Oļegs Šļahovs for Latvia.)	Anton Sikharulidze (Note: Anton Sikharulidze won another silver medal while competing with Maria Petrova.)	Russia	10	5	3	18	

== Ice dance ==
=== Total medal count by nation ===
Number of Grand Prix medals in ice dance by nation
Rank	Nation	Gold	Silver	Bronze	Total
1	United States	52	37	40	129
2	Russia	44	45	35	124
3	Canada	44	44	27	115
4	France	38	23	30	91
5	Italy	13	23	21	57
6	Bulgaria	8	4	5	17
7	Ukraine	4	8	8	20
8	Great Britain	4	5	8	17
9	Lithuania	1	6	14	21
10	China	1	1	1	3
10	Japan	1	1	1	3
12	Israel	0	9	6	15
13	Germany	0	2	4	6
14	Spain	0	1	3	4
15	Hungary	0	1	0	1
16	Finland	0	0	3	3
17	Poland	0	0	2	2
18	Armenia	0	0	1	1
18	Belarus	0	0	1	1
Totals (19 entries)		210	210	210	630

=== Most gold medals by ice dance team ===
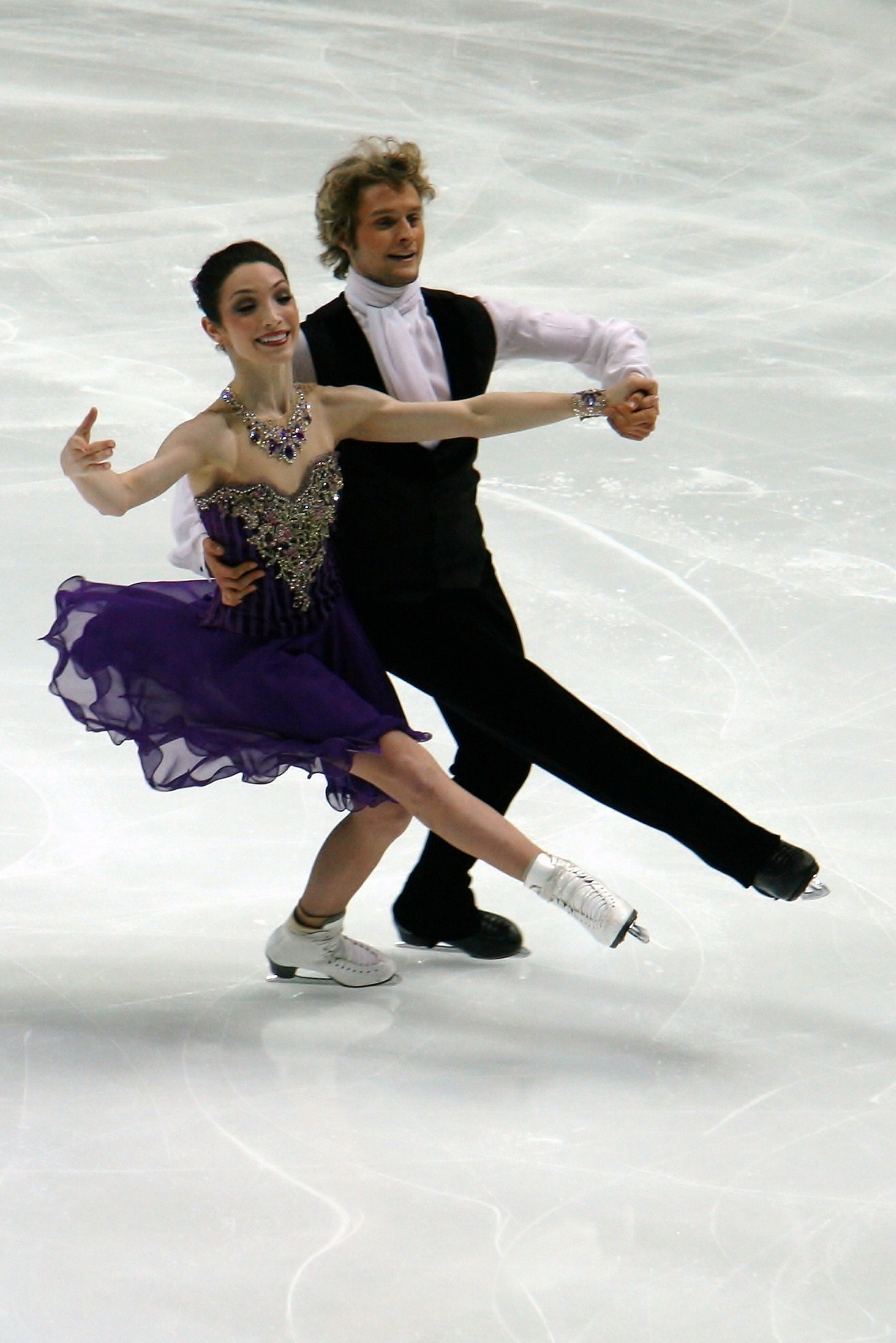
Meryl Davis and Charlie White of the United States have won a record sixteen Grand Prix gold medals in the ice dance event.

- Only teams' results are included in the list. Individual results in the case of partner changes are listed separately below the table.
- If the number of gold medals is identical, the silver and bronze medals are used as tie-breakers (in that order). If all numbers are the same, the teams receive the same placement and are sorted in alphabetical order by the female partner's last name.

Top ranking of ice dance teams by gold medals won at the Grand Prix Series
No.	Female partner	Male partner	Nation	Gold medal – first place	Silver medal – second place	Bronze medal – third place	Total	Ref.
1	Meryl Davis	Charlie White	United States	16	–	3	19	
2	Tessa Virtue	Scott Moir	Canada	14	7	–	21	
3	Marina Anissina	Gwendal Peizerat	France	13	9	3	25	
4	Madison Chock	Evan Bates	United States	12	15	2	29	
5	Gabriella Papadakis	Guillaume Cizeron (Note: Guillaume Cizeron won two gold medals and one silver medal while partnered with Laurence Fournier Beaudry (2025).)	France	12	2	1	15	

== Overall ==
=== Total medal count by nation ===
Number of total Grand Prix medals by nation
Rank	Nation	Gold	Silver	Bronze	Total
1	Russia	239	203	168	610
2	United States	143	159	163	465
3	Japan	121	133	96	350
4	Canada	104	88	95	287
5	China	59	67	50	176
6	France	58	46	61	165
7	Germany	36	15	21	72
8	Italy	22	43	43	108
9	South Korea	11	3	14	28
10	Ukraine	8	15	18	41
11	Bulgaria	8	4	8	20
12	Spain	7	6	5	18
13	Great Britain	4	5	8	17
14	Switzerland	4	4	5	13
15	Georgia	3	3	4	10
16	Uzbekistan	3	1	4	8
17	Belgium	2	6	4	12
18	Czech Republic	2	5	6	13
19	Finland	2	1	9	12
20	Lithuania	1	6	14	21
21	Hungary	1	5	8	14
22	Latvia	1	0	2	3
23	Israel	0	10	8	18
24	Kazakhstan	0	5	3	8
25	Poland	0	2	13	15
26	Azerbaijan	0	1	2	3
27	Belarus	0	1	1	2
27	Estonia	0	1	1	2
29	Austria	0	1	0	1
30	Armenia	0	0	1	1
30	Australia	0	0	1	1
30	Denmark	0	0	1	1
30	Romania	0	0	1	1
30	Sweden	0	0	1	1
Totals (34 entries)		839	839	839	2,517
