= 2013–14 ISU World Standings and Season's World Ranking =

Merit-based ice skating ranking

Season-end No. 1 skaters
- Men's singles: (Japan) Yuzuru Hanyu
- Ladies' singles: (Japan) Mao Asada
- Pairs: (Russia) Tatiana Volosozhar / Maxim Trankov
- Ice dance: (United States) Meryl Davis / Charlie White

Season's No. 1 skaters
- Men's singles: (Japan) Yuzuru Hanyu
- Ladies' singles: (Russia) Yulia Lipnitskaya
- Pairs: (Russia) Tatiana Volosozhar / Maxim Trankov
- Ice dance: (United States) Meryl Davis / Charlie White

Navigation

The 2013–14 ISU World Standings and Season's World Ranking, are the World Standings and Season's World Ranking published by the International Skating Union (ISU) during the 2013–14 season.

The 2013–14 ISU World Standings for single & pair skating and ice dance, are taking into account results of the 2011–12, 2012–13 and 2013–14 seasons.

The 2013–14 ISU Season's World Ranking is based on the results of the 2013–14 season only.

The 2013–14 ISU World standings for synchronized skating, are based on the results of the 2011–12, 2012–13 and 2013–14 seasons.

== World Standings for single & pair skating and ice dance ==
=== Season-end standings ===
The remainder of this section is a complete list, by discipline, published by the ISU.

==== Men's singles (184 skaters) ====
As of 28 March 2014

Rank	Nation	Skater	Points	Season	ISU Championships or Olympics	(Junior) Grand Prix and Final		Selected International Competition	
Rank	Nation	Skater	Points	Season	Best	Best	2nd Best	Best	2nd Best
1	JPN	Yuzuru Hanyu	5078	2013/2014 season (100%)	1200	800	360	250	0
1	JPN	Yuzuru Hanyu	5078	2012/2013 season (100%)	875	720	400	250	0
1	JPN	Yuzuru Hanyu	5078	2011/2012 season (70%)	680	408	280	175	0
2	CAN	Patrick Chan	4608	2013/2014 season (100%)	1080	720	400	0	0
2	CAN	Patrick Chan	4608	2012/2013 season (100%)	1200	648	400	0	0
2	CAN	Patrick Chan	4608	2011/2012 season (70%)	840	560	280	0	0
3	JPN	Tatsuki Machida	4147	2013/2014 season (100%)	1080	583	400	250	0
3	JPN	Tatsuki Machida	4147	2012/2013 season (100%)	0	472	400	250	225
3	JPN	Tatsuki Machida	4147	2011/2012 season (70%)	312	149	0	175	0
4	ESP	Javier Fernandez	4035	2013/2014 season (100%)	972	324	262	0	0
4	ESP	Javier Fernandez	4035	2012/2013 season (100%)	972	583	400	203	0
4	ESP	Javier Fernandez	4035	2011/2012 season (70%)	362	454	252	127	0
5	KAZ	Denis Ten	3871	2013/2014 season (100%)	972	292	0	250	250
5	KAZ	Denis Ten	3871	2012/2013 season (100%)	1080	236	0	250	0
5	KAZ	Denis Ten	3871	2011/2012 season (70%)	447	183	183	175	158
6	JPN	Daisuke Takahashi	3529	2013/2014 season (100%)	709	400	292	0	0
6	JPN	Daisuke Takahashi	3529	2012/2013 season (100%)	709	800	360	0	0
6	JPN	Daisuke Takahashi	3529	2011/2012 season (70%)	756	504	280	0	0
7	CZE	Michal Brezina	3065	2013/2014 season (100%)	612	292	262	0	0
7	CZE	Michal Brezina	3065	2012/2013 season (100%)	680	324	236	225	164
7	CZE	Michal Brezina	3065	2011/2012 season (70%)	496	330	280	158	0
8	JPN	Takahito Mura	3018	2013/2014 season (100%)	840	236	0	250	225
8	JPN	Takahito Mura	3018	2012/2013 season (100%)	574	400	191	0	0
8	JPN	Takahito Mura	3018	2011/2012 season (70%)	386	0	0	175	127
9	RUS	Maxim Kovtun	2911	2013/2014 season (100%)	875	525	360	0	0
9	RUS	Maxim Kovtun	2911	2012/2013 season (100%)	551	350	250	0	0
9	RUS	Maxim Kovtun	2911	2011/2012 season (70%)	0	178	175	0	0
10	JPN	Takahiko Kozuka	2800	2013/2014 season (100%)	756	324	236	0	0
10	JPN	Takahiko Kozuka	2800	2012/2013 season (100%)	0	525	400	250	0
10	JPN	Takahiko Kozuka	2800	2011/2012 season (70%)	293	252	227	0	0
11	USA	Jeremy Abbott	2679	2013/2014 season (100%)	787	324	236	0	0
11	USA	Jeremy Abbott	2679	2012/2013 season (100%)	0	360	262	0	0
11	USA	Jeremy Abbott	2679	2011/2012 season (70%)	402	368	280	158	0
12	CHN	Han Yan	2636	2013/2014 season (100%)	638	472	400	0	0
12	CHN	Han Yan	2636	2012/2013 season (100%)	680	225	164	0	0
12	CHN	Han Yan	2636	2011/2012 season (70%)	350	221	175	0	0
13	RUS	Konstantin Menshov	2622	2013/2014 season (100%)	680	292	191	225	0
13	RUS	Konstantin Menshov	2622	2012/2013 season (100%)	0	292	292	250	225
13	RUS	Konstantin Menshov	2622	2011/2012 season (70%)	0	165	134	175	142
14	USA	Max Aaron	2589	2013/2014 season (100%)	574	324	213	250	0
14	USA	Max Aaron	2589	2012/2013 season (100%)	638	0	0	250	225
14	USA	Max Aaron	2589	2011/2012 season (70%)	0	0	0	115	0
15	USA	Richard Dornbush	2531	2013/2014 season (100%)	551	262	262	182	0
15	USA	Richard Dornbush	2531	2012/2013 season (100%)	551	262	236	225	0
15	USA	Richard Dornbush	2531	2011/2012 season (70%)	166	204	165	0	0
16	RUS	Sergei Voronov	2388	2013/2014 season (100%)	756	0	0	250	250
16	RUS	Sergei Voronov	2388	2012/2013 season (100%)	446	324	213	0	0
16	RUS	Sergei Voronov	2388	2011/2012 season (70%)	228	149	0	0	0
17	FRA	Florent Amodio	2372	2013/2014 season (100%)	237	236	213	0	0
17	FRA	Florent Amodio	2372	2012/2013 season (100%)	756	324	292	0	0
17	FRA	Florent Amodio	2372	2011/2012 season (70%)	551	183	0	0	0
18	SWE	Alexander Majorov	2370	2013/2014 season (100%)	305	213	191	250	250
18	SWE	Alexander Majorov	2370	2012/2013 season (100%)	496	0	0	250	250
18	SWE	Alexander Majorov	2370	2011/2012 season (70%)	205	165	0	175	127
19	JPN	Nobunari Oda	2344	2013/2014 season (100%)	0	648	360	250	0
19	JPN	Nobunari Oda	2344	2012/2013 season (100%)	0	324	262	250	250
19	JPN	Nobunari Oda	2344	2011/2012 season (70%)	0	252	149	0	0
20	GER	Peter Liebers	2303	2013/2014 season (100%)	574	213	213	203	182
20	GER	Peter Liebers	2303	2012/2013 season (100%)	418	0	0	250	250
20	GER	Peter Liebers	2303	2011/2012 season (70%)	134	0	0	158	115
21	USA	Jason Brown	2283	2013/2014 season (100%)	517	324	262	225	0
21	USA	Jason Brown	2283	2012/2013 season (100%)	450	255	250	0	0
21	USA	Jason Brown	2283	2011/2012 season (70%)	284	245	175	0	0
22	USA	Joshua Farris	2225	2013/2014 season (100%)	496	262	0	203	0
22	USA	Joshua Farris	2225	2012/2013 season (100%)	500	315	250	0	0
22	USA	Joshua Farris	2225	2011/2012 season (70%)	315	199	175	0	0
23	USA	Adam Rippon	2203	2013/2014 season (100%)	402	360	292	0	0
23	USA	Adam Rippon	2203	2012/2013 season (100%)	0	292	191	225	0
23	USA	Adam Rippon	2203	2011/2012 season (70%)	428	204	204	0	0
24	USA	Ross Miner	2201	2013/2014 season (100%)	0	0	0	182	0
24	USA	Ross Miner	2201	2012/2013 season (100%)	362	324	262	203	0
24	USA	Ross Miner	2201	2011/2012 season (70%)	476	227	165	0	0
25	FRA	Brian Joubert	2167	2013/2014 season (100%)	402	0	0	225	0
25	FRA	Brian Joubert	2167	2012/2013 season (100%)	612	292	0	250	0
25	FRA	Brian Joubert	2167	2011/2012 season (70%)	613	0	0	175	0
26	CHN	Nan Song	2153	2013/2014 season (100%)	680	236	191	0	0
26	CHN	Nan Song	2153	2012/2013 season (100%)	496	262	0	0	0
26	CHN	Nan Song	2153	2011/2012 season (70%)	213	252	227	0	0
27	CZE	Tomáš Verner	2119	2013/2014 season (100%)	465	0	0	250	250
27	CZE	Tomáš Verner	2119	2012/2013 season (100%)	293	191	191	203	0
27	CZE	Tomáš Verner	2119	2011/2012 season (70%)	386	183	0	0	0
28	CAN	Kevin Reynolds	2087	2013/2014 season (100%)	418	0	0	0	0
28	CAN	Kevin Reynolds	2087	2012/2013 season (100%)	840	262	236	182	0
28	CAN	Kevin Reynolds	2087	2011/2012 season (70%)	281	149	0	0	0
29	RUS	Artur Gachinski	2030	2013/2014 season (100%)	0	236	191	225	203
29	RUS	Artur Gachinski	2030	2012/2013 season (100%)	0	213	0	250	0
29	RUS	Artur Gachinski	2030	2011/2012 season (70%)	529	183	183	0	0
30	FRA	Chafik Besseghier	1905	2013/2014 season (100%)	517	0	0	225	203
30	FRA	Chafik Besseghier	1905	2012/2013 season (100%)	362	213	0	203	182
30	FRA	Chafik Besseghier	1905	2011/2012 season (70%)	185	0	0	175	158
31	PHI	Michael Christian Martinez	1858	2013/2014 season (100%)	180	203	182	182	0
31	PHI	Michael Christian Martinez	1858	2012/2013 season (100%)	328	182	148	250	203
31	PHI	Michael Christian Martinez	1858	2011/2012 season (70%)	80	84	0	0	0
32	CHN	Boyang Jin	1740	2013/2014 season (100%)	295	350	250	0	0
32	CHN	Boyang Jin	1740	2012/2013 season (100%)	365	250	230	0	0
32	CHN	Boyang Jin	1740	2011/2012 season (70%)	0	0	0	0	0
33	UZB	Misha Ge	1619	2013/2014 season (100%)	237	191	0	250	225
33	UZB	Misha Ge	1619	2012/2013 season (100%)	293	0	0	225	182
33	UZB	Misha Ge	1619	2011/2012 season (70%)	253	0	0	158	158
34	JPN	Ryuju Hino	1529	2013/2014 season (100%)	0	225	225	225	0
34	JPN	Ryuju Hino	1529	2012/2013 season (100%)	194	284	225	0	0
34	JPN	Ryuju Hino	1529	2011/2012 season (70%)	151	175	161	0	0
35	BEL	Jorik Hendrickx	1475	2013/2014 season (100%)	362	0	0	225	203
35	BEL	Jorik Hendrickx	1475	2012/2013 season (100%)	180	0	0	250	182
35	BEL	Jorik Hendrickx	1475	2011/2012 season (70%)	253	0	0	175	158
36	RUS	Mikhail Kolyada	1473	2013/2014 season (100%)	0	225	203	250	0
36	RUS	Mikhail Kolyada	1473	2012/2013 season (100%)	295	148	0	225	0
36	RUS	Mikhail Kolyada	1473	2011/2012 season (70%)	0	127	0	0	0
37	RUS	Alexander Petrov	1434	2013/2014 season (100%)	365	230	225	225	0
37	RUS	Alexander Petrov	1434	2012/2013 season (100%)	0	225	164	0	0
37	RUS	Alexander Petrov	1434	2011/2012 season (70%)	0	0	0	0	0
38	JPN	Keiji Tanaka	1389	2013/2014 season (100%)	266	255	250	0	0
38	JPN	Keiji Tanaka	1389	2012/2013 season (100%)	0	225	207	0	0
38	JPN	Keiji Tanaka	1389	2011/2012 season (70%)	186	158	145	0	0
39	JPN	Shoma Uno	1352	2013/2014 season (100%)	328	203	182	0	0
39	JPN	Shoma Uno	1352	2012/2013 season (100%)	266	225	148	0	0
39	JPN	Shoma Uno	1352	2011/2012 season (70%)	136	142	127	0	0
40	CAN	Nam Nguyen	1292	2013/2014 season (100%)	500	182	0	0	0
40	CAN	Nam Nguyen	1292	2012/2013 season (100%)	157	203	108	0	0
40	CAN	Nam Nguyen	1292	2011/2012 season (70%)	99	142	0	0	0
41	GER	Martin Rappe	1288	2013/2014 season (100%)	0	0	0	250	0
41	GER	Martin Rappe	1288	2012/2013 season (100%)	174	164	108	0	0
41	GER	Martin Rappe	1288	2011/2012 season (70%)	122	104	93	158	115
42	RUS	Adian Pitkeev	1283	2013/2014 season (100%)	450	315	250	0	0
42	RUS	Adian Pitkeev	1283	2012/2013 season (100%)	0	148	120	0	0
42	RUS	Adian Pitkeev	1283	2011/2012 season (70%)	0	0	0	0	0
43	ISR	Alexei Bychenko	1213	2013/2014 season (100%)	325	0	0	182	164
43	ISR	Alexei Bychenko	1213	2012/2013 season (100%)	214	0	0	164	164
43	ISR	Alexei Bychenko	1213	2011/2012 season (70%)	64	0	0	0	0
44	BLR	Pavel Ignatenko	1192	2013/2014 season (100%)	113	120	120	203	182
44	BLR	Pavel Ignatenko	1192	2012/2013 season (100%)	237	133	0	0	0
44	BLR	Pavel Ignatenko	1192	2011/2012 season (70%)	0	84	68	0	0
45	KOR	June Hyoung Lee	1191	2013/2014 season (100%)	214	164	148	203	0
45	KOR	June Hyoung Lee	1191	2012/2013 season (100%)	156	164	108	0	0
45	KOR	June Hyoung Lee	1191	2011/2012 season (70%)	58	142	127	0	0
46	USA	Nathan Chen	1189	2013/2014 season (100%)	405	284	250	0	0
46	USA	Nathan Chen	1189	2012/2013 season (100%)	0	250	0	0	0
46	USA	Nathan Chen	1189	2011/2012 season (70%)	0	0	0	0	0
47	CZE	Petr Coufal	1176	2013/2014 season (100%)	194	133	0	203	182
47	CZE	Petr Coufal	1176	2012/2013 season (100%)	0	182	133	0	0
47	CZE	Petr Coufal	1176	2011/2012 season (70%)	65	84	0	0	0
48	PHI	Christopher Caluza	1173	2013/2014 season (100%)	264	0	0	225	164
48	PHI	Christopher Caluza	1173	2012/2013 season (100%)	214	0	0	164	0
48	PHI	Christopher Caluza	1173	2011/2012 season (70%)	185	0	0	142	0
49	KAZ	Abzal Rakimgaliev	1151	2013/2014 season (100%)	192	0	0	203	0
49	KAZ	Abzal Rakimgaliev	1151	2012/2013 season (100%)	192	0	0	225	164
49	KAZ	Abzal Rakimgaliev	1151	2011/2012 season (70%)	98	0	0	175	127
50	AUT	Viktor Pfeifer	1141	2013/2014 season (100%)	214	0	0	225	0
50	AUT	Viktor Pfeifer	1141	2012/2013 season (100%)	402	0	0	0	0
50	AUT	Viktor Pfeifer	1141	2011/2012 season (70%)	98	0	0	158	142
51	CHN	Jinlin Guan	1123	2013/2014 season (100%)	446	0	0	0	0
51	CHN	Jinlin Guan	1123	2012/2013 season (100%)	0	236	213	0	0
51	CHN	Jinlin Guan	1123	2011/2012 season (70%)	228	0	0	0	0
51	CHN	He Zhang	1123	2013/2014 season (100%)	174	225	203	0	0
51	CHN	He Zhang	1123	2012/2013 season (100%)	215	0	0	0	0
51	CHN	He Zhang	1123	2011/2012 season (70%)	207	158	115	0	0
53	ITA	Ivan Righini	1098	2013/2014 season (100%)	339	0	0	250	203
53	ITA	Ivan Righini	1098	2012/2013 season (100%)	0	0	0	164	0
53	ITA	Ivan Righini	1098	2011/2012 season (70%)	0	0	0	142	127
54	SUI	Stephane Walker	1086	2013/2014 season (100%)	156	0	0	250	182
54	SUI	Stephane Walker	1086	2012/2013 season (100%)	113	0	0	203	182
54	SUI	Stephane Walker	1086	2011/2012 season (70%)	0	0	0	115	115
55	JPN	Daisuke Murakami	1068	2013/2014 season (100%)	0	0	0	250	225
55	JPN	Daisuke Murakami	1068	2012/2013 season (100%)	0	0	0	225	203
55	JPN	Daisuke Murakami	1068	2011/2012 season (70%)	0	165	0	175	175
56	DEN	Justus Strid	1063	2013/2014 season (100%)	0	0	0	225	225
56	DEN	Justus Strid	1063	2012/2013 season (100%)	106	0	0	225	203
56	DEN	Justus Strid	1063	2011/2012 season (70%)	79	0	0	158	0
57	USA	Shotaro Omori	1060	2013/2014 season (100%)	0	164	0	0	0
57	USA	Shotaro Omori	1060	2012/2013 season (100%)	405	182	182	0	0
57	USA	Shotaro Omori	1060	2011/2012 season (70%)	0	127	115	0	0
58	KOR	Jin Seo Kim	1054	2013/2014 season (100%)	247	148	148	0	0
58	KOR	Jin Seo Kim	1054	2012/2013 season (100%)	126	203	182	0	0
58	KOR	Jin Seo Kim	1054	2011/2012 season (70%)	0	0	0	0	0
59	CAN	Elladj Balde	1041	2013/2014 season (100%)	293	213	0	182	0
59	CAN	Elladj Balde	1041	2012/2013 season (100%)	140	213	0	0	0
59	CAN	Elladj Balde	1041	2011/2012 season (70%)	0	0	0	0	0
60	ROU	Zoltán Kelemen	1024	2013/2014 season (100%)	146	0	0	0	0
60	ROU	Zoltán Kelemen	1024	2012/2013 season (100%)	140	0	0	225	203
60	ROU	Zoltán Kelemen	1024	2011/2012 season (70%)	150	0	0	158	142
61	RUS	Zhan Bush	1013	2013/2014 season (100%)	0	0	0	225	203
61	RUS	Zhan Bush	1013	2012/2013 season (100%)	0	191	0	164	0
61	RUS	Zhan Bush	1013	2011/2012 season (70%)	230	0	0	0	0
62	GER	Paul Fentz	994	2013/2014 season (100%)	0	0	0	182	182
62	GER	Paul Fentz	994	2012/2013 season (100%)	0	0	0	225	203
62	GER	Paul Fentz	994	2011/2012 season (70%)	109	93	0	0	0
63	GER	Franz Streubel	938	2013/2014 season (100%)	192	0	0	225	164
63	GER	Franz Streubel	938	2012/2013 season (100%)	0	0	0	182	0
63	GER	Franz Streubel	938	2011/2012 season (70%)	0	0	0	175	142
64	ITA	Paolo Bacchini	935	2013/2014 season (100%)	0	0	0	203	0
64	ITA	Paolo Bacchini	935	2012/2013 season (100%)	0	0	0	250	203
64	ITA	Paolo Bacchini	935	2011/2012 season (70%)	121	0	0	158	0
65	MON	Kim Lucine	924	2013/2014 season (100%)	173	0	0	0	0
65	MON	Kim Lucine	924	2012/2013 season (100%)	264	0	0	203	0
65	MON	Kim Lucine	924	2011/2012 season (70%)	166	0	0	142	142
66	CAN	Andrei Rogozine	844	2013/2014 season (100%)	0	191	0	0	0
66	CAN	Andrei Rogozine	844	2012/2013 season (100%)	339	0	0	0	0
66	CAN	Andrei Rogozine	844	2011/2012 season (70%)	0	165	149	0	0
67	RUS	Evgeni Plushenko	838	2013/2014 season (100%)	0	0	0	250	0
67	RUS	Evgeni Plushenko	838	2012/2013 season (100%)	0	0	0	0	0
67	RUS	Evgeni Plushenko	838	2011/2012 season (70%)	588	0	0	0	0
68	RUS	Alexander Samarin	827	2013/2014 season (100%)	0	182	0	0	0
68	RUS	Alexander Samarin	827	2012/2013 season (100%)	239	203	203	0	0
68	RUS	Alexander Samarin	827	2011/2012 season (70%)	0	0	0	0	0
69	ITA	Maurizio Zandron	825	2013/2014 season (100%)	0	0	0	182	164
69	ITA	Maurizio Zandron	825	2012/2013 season (100%)	0	0	0	0	0
69	ITA	Maurizio Zandron	825	2011/2012 season (70%)	48	93	84	127	127
70	POL	Maciej Cieplucha	805	2013/2014 season (100%)	131	0	0	203	0
70	POL	Maciej Cieplucha	805	2012/2013 season (100%)	126	0	0	203	0
70	POL	Maciej Cieplucha	805	2011/2012 season (70%)	88	0	0	142	0
71	AUS	Brendan Kerry	793	2013/2014 season (100%)	113	164	164	250	0
71	AUS	Brendan Kerry	793	2012/2013 season (100%)	102	0	0	0	0
71	AUS	Brendan Kerry	793	2011/2012 season (70%)	88	0	0	0	0
72	USA	Douglas Razzano	757	2013/2014 season (100%)	0	0	0	225	0
72	USA	Douglas Razzano	757	2012/2013 season (100%)	0	0	0	225	0
72	USA	Douglas Razzano	757	2011/2012 season (70%)	0	149	0	158	0
73	FRA	Romain Ponsart	755	2013/2014 season (100%)	0	0	0	0	0
73	FRA	Romain Ponsart	755	2012/2013 season (100%)	0	0	0	182	182
73	FRA	Romain Ponsart	755	2011/2012 season (70%)	0	134	0	142	115
74	TPE	Chih-I Tsao	742	2013/2014 season (100%)	140	148	133	164	0
74	TPE	Chih-I Tsao	742	2012/2013 season (100%)	49	108	0	0	0
74	TPE	Chih-I Tsao	742	2011/2012 season (70%)	34	0	0	0	0
75	RUS	Vladislav Sesganov	736	2013/2014 season (100%)	0	0	0	164	164
75	RUS	Vladislav Sesganov	736	2012/2013 season (100%)	0	0	0	250	0
75	RUS	Vladislav Sesganov	736	2011/2012 season (70%)	0	0	0	158	0
76	USA	Stephen Carriere	724	2013/2014 season (100%)	0	0	0	225	0
76	USA	Stephen Carriere	724	2012/2013 season (100%)	0	0	0	182	0
76	USA	Stephen Carriere	724	2011/2012 season (70%)	0	0	0	175	142
77	CAN	Jeremy Ten	715	2013/2014 season (100%)	362	0	0	203	0
77	CAN	Jeremy Ten	715	2012/2013 season (100%)	0	0	0	0	0
77	CAN	Jeremy Ten	715	2011/2012 season (70%)	150	0	0	0	0
78	UKR	Ivan Pavlov	675	2013/2014 season (100%)	114	133	120	0	0
78	UKR	Ivan Pavlov	675	2012/2013 season (100%)	68	120	120	0	0
78	UKR	Ivan Pavlov	675	2011/2012 season (70%)	0	0	0	0	0
79	FRA	Charles Tetar	657	2013/2014 season (100%)	0	120	0	203	0
79	FRA	Charles Tetar	657	2012/2013 season (100%)	0	133	133	0	0
79	FRA	Charles Tetar	657	2011/2012 season (70%)	0	68	0	0	0
80	EST	Viktor Romanenkov	647	2013/2014 season (100%)	106	0	0	0	0
80	EST	Viktor Romanenkov	647	2012/2013 season (100%)	156	108	97	0	0
80	EST	Viktor Romanenkov	647	2011/2012 season (70%)	58	104	76	0	0
81	CHN	Yi Wang	646	2013/2014 season (100%)	173	0	0	0	0
81	CHN	Yi Wang	646	2012/2013 season (100%)	237	236	0	0	0
81	CHN	Yi Wang	646	2011/2012 season (70%)	0	0	0	0	0
82	USA	Keegan Messing	628	2013/2014 season (100%)	0	0	0	0	0
82	USA	Keegan Messing	628	2012/2013 season (100%)	0	0	0	250	203
82	USA	Keegan Messing	628	2011/2012 season (70%)	0	0	0	175	0
83	AUS	David Kranjec	604	2013/2014 season (100%)	102	97	0	225	0
83	AUS	David Kranjec	604	2012/2013 season (100%)	83	97	0	0	0
83	AUS	David Kranjec	604	2011/2012 season (70%)	0	0	0	0	0
84	USA	Timothy Dolensky	561	2013/2014 season (100%)	0	0	0	0	0
84	USA	Timothy Dolensky	561	2012/2013 season (100%)	0	0	0	182	0
84	USA	Timothy Dolensky	561	2011/2012 season (70%)	110	142	127	0	0
84	CAN	Roman Sadovsky	561	2013/2014 season (100%)	141	120	0	0	0
84	CAN	Roman Sadovsky	561	2012/2013 season (100%)	0	203	97	0	0
84	CAN	Roman Sadovsky	561	2011/2012 season (70%)	0	0	0	0	0
86	RUS	Artur Dmitriev	556	2013/2014 season (100%)	0	0	0	182	0
86	RUS	Artur Dmitriev	556	2012/2013 season (100%)	0	0	0	0	0
86	RUS	Artur Dmitriev	556	2011/2012 season (70%)	89	158	127	0	0
87	ISR	Daniel Samohin	542	2013/2014 season (100%)	157	203	182	0	0
87	ISR	Daniel Samohin	542	2012/2013 season (100%)	0	0	0	0	0
87	ISR	Daniel Samohin	542	2011/2012 season (70%)	0	0	0	0	0
88	JPN	Shu Nakamura	540	2013/2014 season (100%)	0	164	108	0	0
88	JPN	Shu Nakamura	540	2012/2013 season (100%)	0	148	120	0	0
88	JPN	Shu Nakamura	540	2011/2012 season (70%)	0	0	0	0	0
89	JPN	Sei Kawahara	525	2013/2014 season (100%)	0	133	108	0	0
89	JPN	Sei Kawahara	525	2012/2013 season (100%)	0	164	120	0	0
89	JPN	Sei Kawahara	525	2011/2012 season (70%)	0	104	68	0	0
90	UKR	Yakov Godorozha	522	2013/2014 season (100%)	162	0	0	0	0
90	UKR	Yakov Godorozha	522	2012/2013 season (100%)	192	0	0	0	0
90	UKR	Yakov Godorozha	522	2011/2012 season (70%)	0	84	84	0	0
91	KOR	Dong Won Lee	520	2013/2014 season (100%)	126	0	0	164	0
91	KOR	Dong Won Lee	520	2012/2013 season (100%)	0	0	0	0	0
91	KOR	Dong Won Lee	520	2011/2012 season (70%)	0	115	115	0	0
92	GER	Denis Wieczorek	491	2013/2014 season (100%)	0	0	0	0	0
92	GER	Denis Wieczorek	491	2012/2013 season (100%)	0	0	0	182	182
92	GER	Denis Wieczorek	491	2011/2012 season (70%)	0	0	0	127	0
93	USA	Harrison Choate	489	2013/2014 season (100%)	0	0	0	0	0
93	USA	Harrison Choate	489	2012/2013 season (100%)	0	203	182	0	0
93	USA	Harrison Choate	489	2011/2012 season (70%)	0	104	0	0	0
94	GER	Christopher Berneck	482	2013/2014 season (100%)	0	0	0	203	0
94	GER	Christopher Berneck	482	2012/2013 season (100%)	0	0	0	203	0
94	GER	Christopher Berneck	482	2011/2012 season (70%)	0	76	0	0	0
94	FRA	Simon Hocquaux	482	2013/2014 season (100%)	127	97	0	0	0
94	FRA	Simon Hocquaux	482	2012/2013 season (100%)	93	97	0	0	0
94	FRA	Simon Hocquaux	482	2011/2012 season (70%)	0	68	0	0	0
96	USA	Jordan Moeller	471	2013/2014 season (100%)	215	148	108	0	0
96	USA	Jordan Moeller	471	2012/2013 season (100%)	0	0	0	0	0
96	USA	Jordan Moeller	471	2011/2012 season (70%)	0	0	0	0	0
97	LAT	Deniss Vasiljevs	469	2013/2014 season (100%)	239	133	97	0	0
97	LAT	Deniss Vasiljevs	469	2012/2013 season (100%)	0	0	0	0	0
97	LAT	Deniss Vasiljevs	469	2011/2012 season (70%)	0	0	0	0	0
98	RUS	Artem Borodulin	455	2013/2014 season (100%)	0	0	0	0	0
98	RUS	Artem Borodulin	455	2012/2013 season (100%)	0	0	0	164	164
98	RUS	Artem Borodulin	455	2011/2012 season (70%)	0	0	0	127	0
99	HKG	Ronald Lam	428	2013/2014 season (100%)	0	0	0	0	0
99	HKG	Ronald Lam	428	2012/2013 season (100%)	0	0	0	225	203
99	HKG	Ronald Lam	428	2011/2012 season (70%)	0	0	0	0	0
99	ESP	Javier Raya	428	2013/2014 season (100%)	140	0	0	0	0
99	ESP	Javier Raya	428	2012/2013 season (100%)	173	0	0	0	0
99	ESP	Javier Raya	428	2011/2012 season (70%)	74	0	0	115	0
101	CHN	Wenbo Zang	423	2013/2014 season (100%)	93	182	148	0	0
101	CHN	Wenbo Zang	423	2012/2013 season (100%)	0	0	0	0	0
101	CHN	Wenbo Zang	423	2011/2012 season (70%)	0	0	0	0	0
102	JPN	Yoji Tsuboi	417	2013/2014 season (100%)	0	0	0	0	0
102	JPN	Yoji Tsuboi	417	2012/2013 season (100%)	0	0	0	182	0
102	JPN	Yoji Tsuboi	417	2011/2012 season (70%)	0	93	0	142	0
102	FIN	Matthias Versluis	417	2013/2014 season (100%)	0	108	0	0	0
102	FIN	Matthias Versluis	417	2012/2013 season (100%)	75	0	0	0	0
102	FIN	Matthias Versluis	417	2011/2012 season (70%)	43	76	0	115	0
104	USA	Jay Yostanto	411	2013/2014 season (100%)	0	0	0	0	0
104	USA	Jay Yostanto	411	2012/2013 season (100%)	0	148	148	0	0
104	USA	Jay Yostanto	411	2011/2012 season (70%)	0	115	0	0	0
105	FIN	Valtter Virtanen	406	2013/2014 season (100%)	0	0	0	203	0
105	FIN	Valtter Virtanen	406	2012/2013 season (100%)	0	0	0	203	0
105	FIN	Valtter Virtanen	406	2011/2012 season (70%)	0	0	0	0	0
106	ITA	Matteo Rizzo	389	2013/2014 season (100%)	0	0	0	225	164
106	ITA	Matteo Rizzo	389	2012/2013 season (100%)	0	0	0	0	0
106	ITA	Matteo Rizzo	389	2011/2012 season (70%)	0	0	0	0	0
107	RUS	Sergei Borodulin	385	2013/2014 season (100%)	0	0	0	203	182
107	RUS	Sergei Borodulin	385	2012/2013 season (100%)	0	0	0	0	0
107	RUS	Sergei Borodulin	385	2011/2012 season (70%)	0	0	0	0	0
107	RUS	Moris Kvitelashvili	385	2013/2014 season (100%)	0	203	182	0	0
107	RUS	Moris Kvitelashvili	385	2012/2013 season (100%)	0	0	0	0	0
107	RUS	Moris Kvitelashvili	385	2011/2012 season (70%)	0	0	0	0	0
107	FIN	Viktor Zubik	385	2013/2014 season (100%)	0	0	0	182	0
107	FIN	Viktor Zubik	385	2012/2013 season (100%)	0	0	0	0	0
107	FIN	Viktor Zubik	385	2011/2012 season (70%)	0	76	0	127	0
110	GBR	Harry Mattick	381	2013/2014 season (100%)	0	0	0	0	0
110	GBR	Harry Mattick	381	2012/2013 season (100%)	0	0	0	164	164
110	GBR	Harry Mattick	381	2011/2012 season (70%)	53	0	0	0	0
111	JPN	Kento Nakamura	367	2013/2014 season (100%)	0	0	0	0	0
111	JPN	Kento Nakamura	367	2012/2013 season (100%)	0	0	0	225	0
111	JPN	Kento Nakamura	367	2011/2012 season (70%)	0	0	0	142	0
112	RUS	Gordei Gorshkov	361	2013/2014 season (100%)	0	0	0	203	0
112	RUS	Gordei Gorshkov	361	2012/2013 season (100%)	0	0	0	0	0
112	RUS	Gordei Gorshkov	361	2011/2012 season (70%)	0	158	0	0	0
113	GBR	David Richardson	346	2013/2014 season (100%)	0	0	0	0	0
113	GBR	David Richardson	346	2012/2013 season (100%)	0	0	0	182	164
113	GBR	David Richardson	346	2011/2012 season (70%)	0	0	0	0	0
113	JPN	Akio Sasaki	346	2013/2014 season (100%)	0	0	0	164	0
113	JPN	Akio Sasaki	346	2012/2013 season (100%)	0	0	0	182	0
113	JPN	Akio Sasaki	346	2011/2012 season (70%)	0	0	0	0	0
115	ARM	Slavik Hayrapetyan	340	2013/2014 season (100%)	0	0	0	164	0
115	ARM	Slavik Hayrapetyan	340	2012/2013 season (100%)	61	0	0	0	0
115	ARM	Slavik Hayrapetyan	340	2011/2012 season (70%)	0	0	0	115	0
115	CZE	Pavel Kaska	340	2013/2014 season (100%)	0	0	0	0	0
115	CZE	Pavel Kaska	340	2012/2013 season (100%)	0	0	0	225	0
115	CZE	Pavel Kaska	340	2011/2012 season (70%)	0	0	0	115	0
117	GBR	Graham Newberry	336	2013/2014 season (100%)	75	164	97	0	0
117	GBR	Graham Newberry	336	2012/2013 season (100%)	0	0	0	0	0
117	GBR	Graham Newberry	336	2011/2012 season (70%)	0	0	0	0	0
118	RUS	Andrei Zuber	328	2013/2014 season (100%)	0	0	0	0	0
118	RUS	Andrei Zuber	328	2012/2013 season (100%)	0	164	164	0	0
118	RUS	Andrei Zuber	328	2011/2012 season (70%)	0	0	0	0	0
119	JPN	Taichi Honda	327	2013/2014 season (100%)	0	97	0	0	0
119	JPN	Taichi Honda	327	2012/2013 season (100%)	0	133	97	0	0
119	JPN	Taichi Honda	327	2011/2012 season (70%)	0	0	0	0	0
120	CAN	Mitchell Gordon	316	2013/2014 season (100%)	0	0	0	0	0
120	CAN	Mitchell Gordon	316	2012/2013 season (100%)	103	120	0	0	0
120	CAN	Mitchell Gordon	316	2011/2012 season (70%)	0	93	0	0	0
121	CAN	Liam Firus	309	2013/2014 season (100%)	0	0	0	0	0
121	CAN	Liam Firus	309	2012/2013 season (100%)	0	0	0	0	0
121	CAN	Liam Firus	309	2011/2012 season (70%)	167	142	0	0	0
122	USA	Grant Hochstein	297	2013/2014 season (100%)	0	0	0	182	0
122	USA	Grant Hochstein	297	2012/2013 season (100%)	0	0	0	0	0
122	USA	Grant Hochstein	297	2011/2012 season (70%)	0	0	0	115	0
122	RUS	Andrei Lazukin	297	2013/2014 season (100%)	0	164	0	0	0
122	RUS	Andrei Lazukin	297	2012/2013 season (100%)	0	133	0	0	0
122	RUS	Andrei Lazukin	297	2011/2012 season (70%)	0	0	0	0	0
124	MAS	Julian Zhi Jie Yee	286	2013/2014 season (100%)	83	0	0	203	0
124	MAS	Julian Zhi Jie Yee	286	2012/2013 season (100%)	0	0	0	0	0
124	MAS	Julian Zhi Jie Yee	286	2011/2012 season (70%)	0	0	0	0	0
125	BRA	Luiz Manella	279	2013/2014 season (100%)	0	0	0	0	0
125	BRA	Luiz Manella	279	2012/2013 season (100%)	114	0	0	0	0
125	BRA	Luiz Manella	279	2011/2012 season (70%)	72	93	0	0	0
126	ITA	Antonio Panfili	278	2013/2014 season (100%)	0	0	0	0	0
126	ITA	Antonio Panfili	278	2012/2013 season (100%)	55	108	0	0	0
126	ITA	Antonio Panfili	278	2011/2012 season (70%)	0	0	0	115	0
127	JPN	Ryuichi Kihara	269	2013/2014 season (100%)	0	0	0	0	0
127	JPN	Ryuichi Kihara	269	2012/2013 season (100%)	0	0	0	0	0
127	JPN	Ryuichi Kihara	269	2011/2012 season (70%)	0	142	127	0	0
128	ESP	Victor Bustamante	265	2013/2014 season (100%)	49	0	0	0	0
128	ESP	Victor Bustamante	265	2012/2013 season (100%)	83	133	0	0	0
128	ESP	Victor Bustamante	265	2011/2012 season (70%)	0	0	0	0	0
129	AUS	Mark Webster	261	2013/2014 season (100%)	0	0	0	182	0
129	AUS	Mark Webster	261	2012/2013 season (100%)	0	0	0	0	0
129	AUS	Mark Webster	261	2011/2012 season (70%)	79	0	0	0	0
130	BUL	Manol Atanassov	256	2013/2014 season (100%)	0	0	0	164	0
130	BUL	Manol Atanassov	256	2012/2013 season (100%)	92	0	0	0	0
130	BUL	Manol Atanassov	256	2011/2012 season (70%)	0	0	0	0	0
131	CHN	Jialiang Wu	255	2013/2014 season (100%)	0	0	0	0	0
131	CHN	Jialiang Wu	255	2012/2013 season (100%)	0	0	0	0	0
131	CHN	Jialiang Wu	255	2011/2012 season (70%)	121	134	0	0	0
132	KOR	Min Seok Kim	247	2013/2014 season (100%)	0	0	0	0	0
132	KOR	Min Seok Kim	247	2012/2013 season (100%)	113	0	0	0	0
132	KOR	Min Seok Kim	247	2011/2012 season (70%)	134	0	0	0	0
132	ITA	Paul Bonifacio Parkinson	247	2013/2014 season (100%)	83	0	0	0	0
132	ITA	Paul Bonifacio Parkinson	247	2012/2013 season (100%)	0	0	0	164	0
132	ITA	Paul Bonifacio Parkinson	247	2011/2012 season (70%)	0	0	0	0	0
134	PHI	Maverick Eguia	238	2013/2014 season (100%)	74	0	0	164	0
134	PHI	Maverick Eguia	238	2012/2013 season (100%)	0	0	0	0	0
134	PHI	Maverick Eguia	238	2011/2012 season (70%)	0	0	0	0	0
135	SWE	Adrian Schultheiss	230	2013/2014 season (100%)	0	0	0	0	0
135	SWE	Adrian Schultheiss	230	2012/2013 season (100%)	0	0	0	0	0
135	SWE	Adrian Schultheiss	230	2011/2012 season (70%)	0	0	0	115	115
136	USA	Alexander Johnson	225	2013/2014 season (100%)	0	0	0	0	0
136	USA	Alexander Johnson	225	2012/2013 season (100%)	0	0	0	225	0
136	USA	Alexander Johnson	225	2011/2012 season (70%)	0	0	0	0	0
136	RUS	Mark Shakhmatov	225	2013/2014 season (100%)	0	0	0	0	0
136	RUS	Mark Shakhmatov	225	2012/2013 season (100%)	0	0	0	225	0
136	RUS	Mark Shakhmatov	225	2011/2012 season (70%)	0	0	0	0	0
138	RUS	Vladislav Tarasenko	224	2013/2014 season (100%)	0	0	0	0	0
138	RUS	Vladislav Tarasenko	224	2012/2013 season (100%)	0	120	0	0	0
138	RUS	Vladislav Tarasenko	224	2011/2012 season (70%)	0	104	0	0	0
139	NOR	Sondre Oddvoll Bøe	208	2013/2014 season (100%)	44	0	0	164	0
139	NOR	Sondre Oddvoll Bøe	208	2012/2013 season (100%)	0	0	0	0	0
139	NOR	Sondre Oddvoll Bøe	208	2011/2012 season (70%)	0	0	0	0	0
139	USA	Philip Warren	208	2013/2014 season (100%)	0	0	0	0	0
139	USA	Philip Warren	208	2012/2013 season (100%)	0	0	0	0	0
139	USA	Philip Warren	208	2011/2012 season (70%)	0	104	104	0	0
141	RUS	Murad Kurbanov	203	2013/2014 season (100%)	0	203	0	0	0
141	RUS	Murad Kurbanov	203	2012/2013 season (100%)	0	0	0	0	0
141	RUS	Murad Kurbanov	203	2011/2012 season (70%)	0	0	0	0	0
141	RUS	Artem Lezheev	203	2013/2014 season (100%)	0	0	0	203	0
141	RUS	Artem Lezheev	203	2012/2013 season (100%)	0	0	0	0	0
141	RUS	Artem Lezheev	203	2011/2012 season (70%)	0	0	0	0	0
141	FRA	Antoine Pierre	203	2013/2014 season (100%)	0	0	0	203	0
141	FRA	Antoine Pierre	203	2012/2013 season (100%)	0	0	0	0	0
141	FRA	Antoine Pierre	203	2011/2012 season (70%)	0	0	0	0	0
144	TPE	Jordan Ju	184	2013/2014 season (100%)	92	0	0	0	0
144	TPE	Jordan Ju	184	2012/2013 season (100%)	92	0	0	0	0
144	TPE	Jordan Ju	184	2011/2012 season (70%)	71	0	0	0	0
145	PRK	Hyon Choe	182	2013/2014 season (100%)	0	0	0	182	0
145	PRK	Hyon Choe	182	2012/2013 season (100%)	0	0	0	0	0
145	PRK	Hyon Choe	182	2011/2012 season (70%)	0	0	0	0	0
145	BLR	Mikhail Karaliuk	182	2013/2014 season (100%)	0	0	0	182	0
145	BLR	Mikhail Karaliuk	182	2012/2013 season (100%)	0	0	0	0	0
145	BLR	Mikhail Karaliuk	182	2011/2012 season (70%)	0	0	0	0	0
145	USA	Brandon Mroz	182	2013/2014 season (100%)	0	0	0	0	0
145	USA	Brandon Mroz	182	2012/2013 season (100%)	0	0	0	182	0
145	USA	Brandon Mroz	182	2011/2012 season (70%)	0	0	0	0	0
145	GBR	Charlie Parry-Evans	182	2013/2014 season (100%)	0	0	0	182	0
145	GBR	Charlie Parry-Evans	182	2012/2013 season (100%)	0	0	0	0	0
145	GBR	Charlie Parry-Evans	182	2011/2012 season (70%)	0	0	0	0	0
145	SWE	Ondrej Spiegl	182	2013/2014 season (100%)	0	0	0	0	0
145	SWE	Ondrej Spiegl	182	2012/2013 season (100%)	0	0	0	182	0
145	SWE	Ondrej Spiegl	182	2011/2012 season (70%)	0	0	0	0	0
145	USA	Johnny Weir	182	2013/2014 season (100%)	0	0	0	0	0
145	USA	Johnny Weir	182	2012/2013 season (100%)	0	0	0	182	0
145	USA	Johnny Weir	182	2011/2012 season (70%)	0	0	0	0	0
151	GER	Niko Ulanovsky	173	2013/2014 season (100%)	0	97	0	0	0
151	GER	Niko Ulanovsky	173	2012/2013 season (100%)	0	0	0	0	0
151	GER	Niko Ulanovsky	173	2011/2012 season (70%)	0	76	0	0	0
152	TUR	Osman Akgün	164	2013/2014 season (100%)	0	0	0	0	0
152	TUR	Osman Akgün	164	2012/2013 season (100%)	0	0	0	164	0
152	TUR	Osman Akgün	164	2011/2012 season (70%)	0	0	0	0	0
152	FRA	Florian Lejeune	164	2013/2014 season (100%)	0	0	0	164	0
152	FRA	Florian Lejeune	164	2012/2013 season (100%)	0	0	0	0	0
152	FRA	Florian Lejeune	164	2011/2012 season (70%)	0	0	0	0	0
152	ISR	Stanislav Samohin	164	2013/2014 season (100%)	0	0	0	164	0
152	ISR	Stanislav Samohin	164	2012/2013 season (100%)	0	0	0	0	0
152	ISR	Stanislav Samohin	164	2011/2012 season (70%)	0	0	0	0	0
152	SWE	Bertil Skeppar	164	2013/2014 season (100%)	0	0	0	0	0
152	SWE	Bertil Skeppar	164	2012/2013 season (100%)	0	0	0	164	0
152	SWE	Bertil Skeppar	164	2011/2012 season (70%)	0	0	0	0	0
152	RUS	Kirill Sokolov	164	2013/2014 season (100%)	0	0	0	164	0
152	RUS	Kirill Sokolov	164	2012/2013 season (100%)	0	0	0	0	0
152	RUS	Kirill Sokolov	164	2011/2012 season (70%)	0	0	0	0	0
157	GER	Panagiotis Polizoakis	148	2013/2014 season (100%)	0	148	0	0	0
157	GER	Panagiotis Polizoakis	148	2012/2013 season (100%)	0	0	0	0	0
157	GER	Panagiotis Polizoakis	148	2011/2012 season (70%)	0	0	0	0	0
158	FIN	Julian Lagus	142	2013/2014 season (100%)	0	0	0	0	0
158	FIN	Julian Lagus	142	2012/2013 season (100%)	0	0	0	0	0
158	FIN	Julian Lagus	142	2011/2012 season (70%)	0	0	0	142	0
159	GBR	Peter James Hallam	133	2013/2014 season (100%)	0	133	0	0	0
159	GBR	Peter James Hallam	133	2012/2013 season (100%)	0	0	0	0	0
159	GBR	Peter James Hallam	133	2011/2012 season (70%)	0	0	0	0	0
159	CZE	Tomas Kupka	133	2013/2014 season (100%)	0	133	0	0	0
159	CZE	Tomas Kupka	133	2012/2013 season (100%)	0	0	0	0	0
159	CZE	Tomas Kupka	133	2011/2012 season (70%)	0	0	0	0	0
161	USA	Jonathan Cassar	127	2013/2014 season (100%)	0	0	0	0	0
161	USA	Jonathan Cassar	127	2012/2013 season (100%)	0	0	0	0	0
161	USA	Jonathan Cassar	127	2011/2012 season (70%)	0	0	0	127	0
161	SUI	Mikael Redin	127	2013/2014 season (100%)	0	0	0	0	0
161	SUI	Mikael Redin	127	2012/2013 season (100%)	0	0	0	0	0
161	SUI	Mikael Redin	127	2011/2012 season (70%)	0	0	0	127	0
163	GER	Alexander Bjelde	120	2013/2014 season (100%)	0	120	0	0	0
163	GER	Alexander Bjelde	120	2012/2013 season (100%)	0	0	0	0	0
163	GER	Alexander Bjelde	120	2011/2012 season (70%)	0	0	0	0	0
163	UKR	Igor Reznichenko	120	2013/2014 season (100%)	0	120	0	0	0
163	UKR	Igor Reznichenko	120	2012/2013 season (100%)	0	0	0	0	0
163	UKR	Igor Reznichenko	120	2011/2012 season (70%)	0	0	0	0	0
165	CHN	Jiaxing Liu	115	2013/2014 season (100%)	0	0	0	0	0
165	CHN	Jiaxing Liu	115	2012/2013 season (100%)	0	0	0	0	0
165	CHN	Jiaxing Liu	115	2011/2012 season (70%)	0	115	0	0	0
165	USA	David Wang	115	2013/2014 season (100%)	0	0	0	0	0
165	USA	David Wang	115	2012/2013 season (100%)	0	0	0	0	0
165	USA	David Wang	115	2011/2012 season (70%)	0	115	0	0	0
167	KOR	Alex Kang Chan Kam	109	2013/2014 season (100%)	0	0	0	0	0
167	KOR	Alex Kang Chan Kam	109	2012/2013 season (100%)	0	0	0	0	0
167	KOR	Alex Kang Chan Kam	109	2011/2012 season (70%)	109	0	0	0	0
168	RUS	Feodosiy Efremenkov	108	2013/2014 season (100%)	0	0	0	0	0
168	RUS	Feodosiy Efremenkov	108	2012/2013 season (100%)	0	108	0	0	0
168	RUS	Feodosiy Efremenkov	108	2011/2012 season (70%)	0	0	0	0	0
168	RUS	Alexei Genia	108	2013/2014 season (100%)	0	108	0	0	0
168	RUS	Alexei Genia	108	2012/2013 season (100%)	0	0	0	0	0
168	RUS	Alexei Genia	108	2011/2012 season (70%)	0	0	0	0	0
168	CZE	Jan Kurnik	108	2013/2014 season (100%)	0	108	0	0	0
168	CZE	Jan Kurnik	108	2012/2013 season (100%)	0	0	0	0	0
168	CZE	Jan Kurnik	108	2011/2012 season (70%)	0	0	0	0	0
168	JPN	Taichiro Yamakuma	108	2013/2014 season (100%)	0	108	0	0	0
168	JPN	Taichiro Yamakuma	108	2012/2013 season (100%)	0	0	0	0	0
168	JPN	Taichiro Yamakuma	108	2011/2012 season (70%)	0	0	0	0	0
172	CAN	Leslie Ip	97	2013/2014 season (100%)	0	97	0	0	0
172	CAN	Leslie Ip	97	2012/2013 season (100%)	0	0	0	0	0
172	CAN	Leslie Ip	97	2011/2012 season (70%)	0	0	0	0	0
172	GBR	Jack Newberry	97	2013/2014 season (100%)	0	0	0	0	0
172	GBR	Jack Newberry	97	2012/2013 season (100%)	0	97	0	0	0
172	GBR	Jack Newberry	97	2011/2012 season (70%)	0	0	0	0	0
172	SUI	Nicola Todeschini	97	2013/2014 season (100%)	0	0	0	0	0
172	SUI	Nicola Todeschini	97	2012/2013 season (100%)	0	97	0	0	0
172	SUI	Nicola Todeschini	97	2011/2012 season (70%)	0	0	0	0	0
175	CAN	Samuel Angers	93	2013/2014 season (100%)	0	0	0	0	0
175	CAN	Samuel Angers	93	2012/2013 season (100%)	0	0	0	0	0
175	CAN	Samuel Angers	93	2011/2012 season (70%)	0	93	0	0	0
176	CAN	Peter O Brien	76	2013/2014 season (100%)	0	0	0	0	0
176	CAN	Peter O Brien	76	2012/2013 season (100%)	0	0	0	0	0
176	CAN	Peter O Brien	76	2011/2012 season (70%)	0	76	0	0	0
176	SUI	Noah Scherer	76	2013/2014 season (100%)	0	0	0	0	0
176	SUI	Noah Scherer	76	2012/2013 season (100%)	0	0	0	0	0
176	SUI	Noah Scherer	76	2011/2012 season (70%)	0	76	0	0	0
178	UKR	Dmitri Ignatenko	71	2013/2014 season (100%)	0	0	0	0	0
178	UKR	Dmitri Ignatenko	71	2012/2013 season (100%)	0	0	0	0	0
178	UKR	Dmitri Ignatenko	71	2011/2012 season (70%)	71	0	0	0	0
179	CAN	Christophe Belley-Lemelin	68	2013/2014 season (100%)	0	0	0	0	0
179	CAN	Christophe Belley-Lemelin	68	2012/2013 season (100%)	0	0	0	0	0
179	CAN	Christophe Belley-Lemelin	68	2011/2012 season (70%)	0	68	0	0	0
179	FRA	Thomas Sosniak	68	2013/2014 season (100%)	0	0	0	0	0
179	FRA	Thomas Sosniak	68	2012/2013 season (100%)	0	0	0	0	0
179	FRA	Thomas Sosniak	68	2011/2012 season (70%)	0	68	0	0	0
181	BRA	Kevin Alves	58	2013/2014 season (100%)	0	0	0	0	0
181	BRA	Kevin Alves	58	2012/2013 season (100%)	0	0	0	0	0
181	BRA	Kevin Alves	58	2011/2012 season (70%)	58	0	0	0	0
182	SWE	Illya Solomin	55	2013/2014 season (100%)	55	0	0	0	0
182	SWE	Illya Solomin	55	2012/2013 season (100%)	0	0	0	0	0
182	SWE	Illya Solomin	55	2011/2012 season (70%)	0	0	0	0	0
183	AUS	Nicholas Fernandez	52	2013/2014 season (100%)	0	0	0	0	0
183	AUS	Nicholas Fernandez	52	2012/2013 season (100%)	0	0	0	0	0
183	AUS	Nicholas Fernandez	52	2011/2012 season (70%)	52	0	0	0	0
184	SWE	Marcus Björk	31	2013/2014 season (100%)	0	0	0	0	0
184	SWE	Marcus Björk	31	2012/2013 season (100%)	0	0	0	0	0
184	SWE	Marcus Björk	31	2011/2012 season (70%)	31	0	0	0	0

==== Ladies' singles (234 skaters) ====
As of 29 March 2014

Rank	Nation	Skater	Points	Season	ISU Championships or Olympics	(Junior) Grand Prix and Final		Selected International Competition	
Rank	Nation	Skater	Points	Season	Best	Best	2nd Best	Best	2nd Best
1	JPN	Mao Asada	4572	2013/2014 season (100%)	1200	800	400	0	0
1	JPN	Mao Asada	4572	2012/2013 season (100%)	972	800	400	0	0
1	JPN	Mao Asada	4572	2011/2012 season (70%)	529	280	252	0	0
2	ITA	Carolina Kostner	4251	2013/2014 season (100%)	972	360	324	0	0
2	ITA	Carolina Kostner	4251	2012/2013 season (100%)	1080	0	0	250	250
2	ITA	Carolina Kostner	4251	2011/2012 season (70%)	840	560	280	175	0
3	RUS	Yulia Lipnitskaya	3834	2013/2014 season (100%)	1080	720	400	250	0
3	RUS	Yulia Lipnitskaya	3834	2012/2013 season (100%)	450	360	324	250	0
3	RUS	Yulia Lipnitskaya	3834	2011/2012 season (70%)	350	245	175	0	0
4	RUS	Adelina Sotnikova	3827	2013/2014 season (100%)	1200	525	360	0	0
4	RUS	Adelina Sotnikova	3827	2012/2013 season (100%)	756	324	262	225	0
4	RUS	Adelina Sotnikova	3827	2011/2012 season (70%)	284	227	227	175	0
5	USA	Ashley Wagner	3593	2013/2014 season (100%)	638	648	400	0	0
5	USA	Ashley Wagner	3593	2012/2013 season (100%)	787	720	400	0	0
5	USA	Ashley Wagner	3593	2011/2012 season (70%)	613	227	204	0	0
6	JPN	Akiko Suzuki	3562	2013/2014 season (100%)	709	360	324	225	0
6	JPN	Akiko Suzuki	3562	2012/2013 season (100%)	756	648	360	0	0
6	JPN	Akiko Suzuki	3562	2011/2012 season (70%)	680	504	280	0	0
7	USA	Gracie Gold	3223	2013/2014 season (100%)	875	324	292	225	0
7	USA	Gracie Gold	3223	2012/2013 season (100%)	709	360	213	225	0
7	USA	Gracie Gold	3223	2011/2012 season (70%)	315	175	0	0	0
8	JPN	Kanako Murakami	2836	2013/2014 season (100%)	840	292	213	0	0
8	JPN	Kanako Murakami	2836	2012/2013 season (100%)	875	324	292	0	0
8	JPN	Kanako Murakami	2836	2011/2012 season (70%)	551	204	165	0	0
9	RUS	Elena Radionova	2793	2013/2014 season (100%)	500	583	360	250	0
9	RUS	Elena Radionova	2793	2012/2013 season (100%)	500	350	250	0	0
9	RUS	Elena Radionova	2793	2011/2012 season (70%)	0	0	0	0	0
10	KOR	Yuna Kim	2780	2013/2014 season (100%)	1080	0	0	250	0
10	KOR	Yuna Kim	2780	2012/2013 season (100%)	1200	0	0	250	0
10	KOR	Yuna Kim	2780	2011/2012 season (70%)	0	0	0	0	0
11	ITA	Valentina Marchei	2757	2013/2014 season (100%)	496	236	213	250	0
11	ITA	Valentina Marchei	2757	2012/2013 season (100%)	612	292	0	250	250
11	ITA	Valentina Marchei	2757	2011/2012 season (70%)	402	0	0	158	0
12	FRA	Maé-Bérénice Méité	2689	2013/2014 season (100%)	551	262	236	0	0
12	FRA	Maé-Bérénice Méité	2689	2012/2013 season (100%)	418	262	236	225	182
12	FRA	Maé-Bérénice Méité	2689	2011/2012 season (70%)	166	165	149	175	142
13	RUS	Anna Pogorilaya	2686	2013/2014 season (100%)	875	472	400	0	0
13	RUS	Anna Pogorilaya	2686	2012/2013 season (100%)	405	284	250	0	0
13	RUS	Anna Pogorilaya	2686	2011/2012 season (70%)	0	0	0	0	0
14	RUS	Elizaveta Tuktamysheva	2671	2013/2014 season (100%)	0	292	292	203	203
14	RUS	Elizaveta Tuktamysheva	2671	2012/2013 season (100%)	680	525	360	0	0
14	RUS	Elizaveta Tuktamysheva	2671	2011/2012 season (70%)	0	408	280	0	0
15	JPN	Haruka Imai	2661	2013/2014 season (100%)	612	236	0	250	225
15	JPN	Haruka Imai	2661	2012/2013 season (100%)	0	262	191	225	203
15	JPN	Haruka Imai	2661	2011/2012 season (70%)	253	204	165	0	0
16	CHN	Zijun Li	2633	2013/2014 season (100%)	680	0	0	0	0
16	CHN	Zijun Li	2633	2012/2013 season (100%)	638	292	262	250	0
16	CHN	Zijun Li	2633	2011/2012 season (70%)	230	178	158	175	0
17	SWE	Viktoria Helgesson	2619	2013/2014 season (100%)	214	213	191	225	182
17	SWE	Viktoria Helgesson	2619	2012/2013 season (100%)	551	191	191	250	203
17	SWE	Viktoria Helgesson	2619	2011/2012 season (70%)	386	227	183	175	127
18	RUS	Alena Leonova	2523	2013/2014 season (100%)	612	213	0	0	0
18	RUS	Alena Leonova	2523	2012/2013 season (100%)	339	236	213	0	0
18	RUS	Alena Leonova	2523	2011/2012 season (70%)	756	454	252	0	0
19	USA	Christina Gao	2316	2013/2014 season (100%)	0	292	191	203	0
19	USA	Christina Gao	2316	2012/2013 season (100%)	612	472	360	0	0
19	USA	Christina Gao	2316	2011/2012 season (70%)	186	183	0	0	0
20	JPN	Satoko Miyahara	2276	2013/2014 season (100%)	756	262	262	250	0
20	JPN	Satoko Miyahara	2276	2012/2013 season (100%)	266	250	230	0	0
20	JPN	Satoko Miyahara	2276	2011/2012 season (70%)	256	158	115	0	0
21	USA	Agnes Zawadzki	2216	2013/2014 season (100%)	0	236	213	182	0
21	USA	Agnes Zawadzki	2216	2012/2013 season (100%)	402	324	262	250	0
21	USA	Agnes Zawadzki	2216	2011/2012 season (70%)	347	149	134	0	0
22	USA	Courtney Hicks	2197	2013/2014 season (100%)	551	236	0	250	250
22	USA	Courtney Hicks	2197	2012/2013 season (100%)	328	225	182	0	0
22	USA	Courtney Hicks	2197	2011/2012 season (70%)	0	175	0	0	0
23	FIN	Kiira Korpi	2085	2013/2014 season (100%)	0	0	0	0	0
23	FIN	Kiira Korpi	2085	2012/2013 season (100%)	0	583	400	225	0
23	FIN	Kiira Korpi	2085	2011/2012 season (70%)	529	183	165	0	0
24	USA	Mirai Nagasu	2077	2013/2014 season (100%)	325	324	191	182	0
24	USA	Mirai Nagasu	2077	2012/2013 season (100%)	0	324	292	203	0
24	USA	Mirai Nagasu	2077	2011/2012 season (70%)	0	252	183	175	0
25	SWE	Joshi Helgesson	1977	2013/2014 season (100%)	362	0	0	250	250
25	SWE	Joshi Helgesson	1977	2012/2013 season (100%)	402	213	0	250	250
25	SWE	Joshi Helgesson	1977	2011/2012 season (70%)	228	0	0	158	142
26	CAN	Amelie Lacoste	1966	2013/2014 season (100%)	264	262	236	164	0
26	CAN	Amelie Lacoste	1966	2012/2013 season (100%)	362	236	191	203	0
26	CAN	Amelie Lacoste	1966	2011/2012 season (70%)	312	165	134	0	0
27	GER	Nathalie Weinzierl	1897	2013/2014 season (100%)	402	0	0	250	203
27	GER	Nathalie Weinzierl	1897	2012/2013 season (100%)	362	108	97	250	225
27	GER	Nathalie Weinzierl	1897	2011/2012 season (70%)	64	0	0	175	0
28	USA	Samantha Cesario	1869	2013/2014 season (100%)	402	292	262	203	0
28	USA	Samantha Cesario	1869	2012/2013 season (100%)	365	203	0	0	0
28	USA	Samantha Cesario	1869	2011/2012 season (70%)	0	142	142	0	0
29	GEO	Elene Gedevanishvili	1789	2013/2014 season (100%)	325	0	0	0	0
29	GEO	Elene Gedevanishvili	1789	2012/2013 season (100%)	214	262	236	0	0
29	GEO	Elene Gedevanishvili	1789	2011/2012 season (70%)	476	183	149	158	0
30	EST	Elena Glebova	1695	2013/2014 season (100%)	446	0	0	250	0
30	EST	Elena Glebova	1695	2012/2013 season (100%)	247	213	0	182	182
30	EST	Elena Glebova	1695	2011/2012 season (70%)	237	0	0	175	175
31	UKR	Natalia Popova	1678	2013/2014 season (100%)	146	213	0	250	0
31	UKR	Natalia Popova	1678	2012/2013 season (100%)	275	97	0	225	182
31	UKR	Natalia Popova	1678	2011/2012 season (70%)	185	93	0	158	158
32	RUS	Nikol Gosviani	1674	2013/2014 season (100%)	0	262	191	250	225
32	RUS	Nikol Gosviani	1674	2012/2013 season (100%)	496	0	0	250	0
32	RUS	Nikol Gosviani	1674	2011/2012 season (70%)	0	0	0	0	0
33	CAN	Kaetlyn Osmond	1642	2013/2014 season (100%)	418	0	0	0	0
33	CAN	Kaetlyn Osmond	1642	2012/2013 season (100%)	574	400	0	250	0
33	CAN	Kaetlyn Osmond	1642	2011/2012 season (70%)	136	0	0	0	0
34	ESP	Sonia Lafuente	1499	2013/2014 season (100%)	0	0	0	182	0
34	ESP	Sonia Lafuente	1499	2012/2013 season (100%)	446	0	0	250	164
34	ESP	Sonia Lafuente	1499	2011/2012 season (70%)	193	149	0	115	0
35	RUS	Polina Korobeynikova	1484	2013/2014 season (100%)	0	0	0	0	0
35	RUS	Polina Korobeynikova	1484	2012/2013 season (100%)	0	236	213	250	0
35	RUS	Polina Korobeynikova	1484	2011/2012 season (70%)	428	199	158	0	0
36	AUS	Brooklee Han	1419	2013/2014 season (100%)	214	120	0	250	164
36	AUS	Brooklee Han	1419	2012/2013 season (100%)	264	120	0	203	0
36	AUS	Brooklee Han	1419	2011/2012 season (70%)	0	84	0	0	0
37	GBR	Jenna McCorkell	1418	2013/2014 season (100%)	74	0	0	225	0
37	GBR	Jenna McCorkell	1418	2012/2013 season (100%)	162	191	0	250	250
37	GBR	Jenna McCorkell	1418	2011/2012 season (70%)	213	0	0	127	115
38	CHN	Kexin Zhang	1392	2013/2014 season (100%)	293	191	0	225	0
38	CHN	Kexin Zhang	1392	2012/2013 season (100%)	325	0	0	0	0
38	CHN	Kexin Zhang	1392	2011/2012 season (70%)	447	204	0	0	0
39	RUS	Ksenia Makarova	1368	2013/2014 season (100%)	0	0	0	0	0
39	RUS	Ksenia Makarova	1368	2012/2013 season (100%)	0	236	213	225	0
39	RUS	Ksenia Makarova	1368	2011/2012 season (70%)	362	183	149	0	0
40	KOR	Hae Jin Kim	1339	2013/2014 season (100%)	496	120	97	0	0
40	KOR	Hae Jin Kim	1339	2012/2013 season (100%)	75	250	164	0	0
40	KOR	Hae Jin Kim	1339	2011/2012 season (70%)	167	142	115	0	0
41	CAN	Gabrielle Daleman	1331	2013/2014 season (100%)	339	203	182	0	0
41	CAN	Gabrielle Daleman	1331	2012/2013 season (100%)	295	164	148	0	0
41	CAN	Gabrielle Daleman	1331	2011/2012 season (70%)	0	0	0	0	0
42	AUT	Kerstin Frank	1316	2013/2014 season (100%)	0	0	0	250	225
42	AUT	Kerstin Frank	1316	2012/2013 season (100%)	264	0	0	250	225
42	AUT	Kerstin Frank	1316	2011/2012 season (70%)	102	0	0	115	115
43	CAN	Alaine Chartrand	1281	2013/2014 season (100%)	446	182	133	0	0
43	CAN	Alaine Chartrand	1281	2012/2013 season (100%)	239	148	133	0	0
43	CAN	Alaine Chartrand	1281	2011/2012 season (70%)	0	0	0	0	0
44	KOR	So Youn Park	1278	2013/2014 season (100%)	517	0	0	0	0
44	KOR	So Youn Park	1278	2012/2013 season (100%)	157	225	148	0	0
44	KOR	So Youn Park	1278	2011/2012 season (70%)	0	127	104	0	0
45	ITA	Roberta Rodeghiero	1246	2013/2014 season (100%)	293	0	0	250	250
45	ITA	Roberta Rodeghiero	1246	2012/2013 season (100%)	0	0	0	250	203
45	ITA	Roberta Rodeghiero	1246	2011/2012 season (70%)	0	0	0	175	158
46	SWE	Isabelle Olsson	1240	2013/2014 season (100%)	173	0	0	250	182
46	SWE	Isabelle Olsson	1240	2012/2013 season (100%)	0	0	0	250	225
46	SWE	Isabelle Olsson	1240	2011/2012 season (70%)	0	84	76	142	142
47	JPN	Rika Hongo	1228	2013/2014 season (100%)	239	203	182	0	0
47	JPN	Rika Hongo	1228	2012/2013 season (100%)	215	225	164	0	0
47	JPN	Rika Hongo	1228	2011/2012 season (70%)	0	0	0	0	0
48	SVK	Monika Simancikova	1204	2013/2014 season (100%)	0	0	0	0	0
48	SVK	Monika Simancikova	1204	2012/2013 season (100%)	222	133	0	225	203
48	SVK	Monika Simancikova	1204	2011/2012 season (70%)	150	76	68	127	0
49	GER	Sarah Hecken	1197	2013/2014 season (100%)	0	0	0	225	225
49	GER	Sarah Hecken	1197	2012/2013 season (100%)	0	0	0	250	250
49	GER	Sarah Hecken	1197	2011/2012 season (70%)	113	134	0	175	127
50	RUS	Kristina Zaseeva	1121	2013/2014 season (100%)	0	0	0	0	0
50	RUS	Kristina Zaseeva	1121	2012/2013 season (100%)	0	182	133	225	203
50	RUS	Kristina Zaseeva	1121	2011/2012 season (70%)	0	93	0	158	127
51	SVK	Nicole Rajicová	1110	2013/2014 season (100%)	156	120	0	203	203
51	SVK	Nicole Rajicová	1110	2012/2013 season (100%)	0	0	0	225	203
51	SVK	Nicole Rajicová	1110	2011/2012 season (70%)	0	0	0	0	0
52	USA	Polina Edmunds	1079	2013/2014 season (100%)	574	255	250	0	0
52	USA	Polina Edmunds	1079	2012/2013 season (100%)	0	0	0	0	0
52	USA	Polina Edmunds	1079	2011/2012 season (70%)	0	0	0	0	0
53	DEN	Anita Madsen	1074	2013/2014 season (100%)	0	0	0	225	164
53	DEN	Anita Madsen	1074	2012/2013 season (100%)	173	0	0	225	203
53	DEN	Anita Madsen	1074	2011/2012 season (70%)	0	84	0	0	0
54	RUS	Polina Agafonova	1069	2013/2014 season (100%)	0	0	0	225	182
54	RUS	Polina Agafonova	1069	2012/2013 season (100%)	0	0	0	203	0
54	RUS	Polina Agafonova	1069	2011/2012 season (70%)	0	142	142	175	0
55	CZE	Eliška Brezinová	1020	2013/2014 season (100%)	200	0	0	250	164
55	CZE	Eliška Brezinová	1020	2012/2013 season (100%)	0	0	0	203	203
55	CZE	Eliška Brezinová	1020	2011/2012 season (70%)	0	0	0	0	0
56	JPN	Miyabi Oba	1017	2013/2014 season (100%)	0	203	182	0	0
56	JPN	Miyabi Oba	1017	2012/2013 season (100%)	0	225	182	225	0
56	JPN	Miyabi Oba	1017	2011/2012 season (70%)	0	93	0	0	0
57	RUS	Serafima Sakhanovich	1015	2013/2014 season (100%)	450	315	250	0	0
57	RUS	Serafima Sakhanovich	1015	2012/2013 season (100%)	0	0	0	0	0
57	RUS	Serafima Sakhanovich	1015	2011/2012 season (70%)	0	0	0	0	0
58	FRA	Lenaelle Gilleron Gorry	989	2013/2014 season (100%)	0	0	0	0	0
58	FRA	Lenaelle Gilleron Gorry	989	2012/2013 season (100%)	293	120	108	0	0
58	FRA	Lenaelle Gilleron Gorry	989	2011/2012 season (70%)	0	84	84	158	142
58	EST	Gerli Liinamäe	989	2013/2014 season (100%)	68	0	0	0	0
58	EST	Gerli Liinamäe	989	2012/2013 season (100%)	0	148	108	164	0
58	EST	Gerli Liinamäe	989	2011/2012 season (70%)	89	127	127	158	0
60	FIN	Juulia Turkkila	962	2013/2014 season (100%)	264	0	0	203	164
60	FIN	Juulia Turkkila	962	2012/2013 season (100%)	156	0	0	0	0
60	FIN	Juulia Turkkila	962	2011/2012 season (70%)	140	0	0	175	0
61	ITA	Carol Bressanutti	939	2013/2014 season (100%)	0	0	0	250	203
61	ITA	Carol Bressanutti	939	2012/2013 season (100%)	0	0	0	225	203
61	ITA	Carol Bressanutti	939	2011/2012 season (70%)	58	0	0	0	0
61	RUS	Evgenia Medvedeva	939	2013/2014 season (100%)	405	284	250	0	0
61	RUS	Evgenia Medvedeva	939	2012/2013 season (100%)	0	0	0	0	0
61	RUS	Evgenia Medvedeva	939	2011/2012 season (70%)	0	0	0	0	0
63	USA	Angela Wang	937	2013/2014 season (100%)	0	225	207	0	0
63	USA	Angela Wang	937	2012/2013 season (100%)	0	255	250	0	0
63	USA	Angela Wang	937	2011/2012 season (70%)	0	0	0	0	0
64	RUS	Polina Shelepen	931	2013/2014 season (100%)	0	0	0	0	0
64	RUS	Polina Shelepen	931	2012/2013 season (100%)	0	0	0	164	164
64	RUS	Polina Shelepen	931	2011/2012 season (70%)	207	221	175	0	0
65	CHN	Ziquan Zhao	922	2013/2014 season (100%)	192	0	0	0	0
65	CHN	Ziquan Zhao	922	2012/2013 season (100%)	114	182	97	225	0
65	CHN	Ziquan Zhao	922	2011/2012 season (70%)	122	104	0	0	0
66	FRA	Laurine Lecavelier	912	2013/2014 season (100%)	237	108	0	0	0
66	FRA	Laurine Lecavelier	912	2012/2013 season (100%)	141	108	0	250	0
66	FRA	Laurine Lecavelier	912	2011/2012 season (70%)	0	68	0	0	0
67	ITA	Francesca Rio	893	2013/2014 season (100%)	0	0	0	225	203
67	ITA	Francesca Rio	893	2012/2013 season (100%)	0	0	0	225	182
67	ITA	Francesca Rio	893	2011/2012 season (70%)	58	0	0	158	142
68	MEX	Reyna Hamui	885	2013/2014 season (100%)	126	0	0	225	0
68	MEX	Reyna Hamui	885	2012/2013 season (100%)	237	0	0	182	0
68	MEX	Reyna Hamui	885	2011/2012 season (70%)	0	0	0	115	0
69	USA	Alissa Czisny	882	2013/2014 season (100%)	0	0	0	0	0
69	USA	Alissa Czisny	882	2012/2013 season (100%)	0	0	0	0	0
69	USA	Alissa Czisny	882	2011/2012 season (70%)	92	368	280	142	0
70	SLO	Dasa Grm	878	2013/2014 season (100%)	0	0	0	225	225
70	SLO	Dasa Grm	878	2012/2013 season (100%)	0	0	0	225	203
70	SLO	Dasa Grm	878	2011/2012 season (70%)	0	0	0	175	115
71	ITA	Giada Russo	867	2013/2014 season (100%)	0	97	0	203	182
71	ITA	Giada Russo	867	2012/2013 season (100%)	0	0	0	203	182
71	ITA	Giada Russo	867	2011/2012 season (70%)	0	0	0	0	0
72	LUX	Fleur Maxwell	844	2013/2014 season (100%)	0	0	0	203	203
72	LUX	Fleur Maxwell	844	2012/2013 season (100%)	74	0	0	182	182
72	LUX	Fleur Maxwell	844	2011/2012 season (70%)	0	0	0	158	0
73	USA	Caroline Zhang	816	2013/2014 season (100%)	0	0	0	0	0
73	USA	Caroline Zhang	816	2012/2013 season (100%)	0	0	0	0	0
73	USA	Caroline Zhang	816	2011/2012 season (70%)	476	165	0	175	0
74	CZE	Elizaveta Ukolova	783	2013/2014 season (100%)	131	108	0	203	182
74	CZE	Elizaveta Ukolova	783	2012/2013 season (100%)	0	120	0	0	0
74	CZE	Elizaveta Ukolova	783	2011/2012 season (70%)	39	0	0	0	0
75	USA	Vanessa Lam	781	2013/2014 season (100%)	0	0	0	164	0
75	USA	Vanessa Lam	781	2012/2013 season (100%)	0	182	0	0	0
75	USA	Vanessa Lam	781	2011/2012 season (70%)	99	175	161	0	0
76	CAN	Julianne Séguin	779	2013/2014 season (100%)	0	148	108	0	0
76	CAN	Julianne Séguin	779	2012/2013 season (100%)	293	133	97	0	0
76	CAN	Julianne Séguin	779	2011/2012 season (70%)	0	0	0	0	0
77	SUI	Anna Ovcharova	732	2013/2014 season (100%)	162	0	0	225	203
77	SUI	Anna Ovcharova	732	2012/2013 season (100%)	0	0	0	0	0
77	SUI	Anna Ovcharova	732	2011/2012 season (70%)	0	0	0	142	0
78	SLO	Nika Ceric	731	2013/2014 season (100%)	0	0	0	182	182
78	SLO	Nika Ceric	731	2012/2013 season (100%)	0	0	0	225	0
78	SLO	Nika Ceric	731	2011/2012 season (70%)	0	0	0	142	0
79	FRA	Anais Ventard	688	2013/2014 season (100%)	114	0	0	203	203
79	FRA	Anais Ventard	688	2012/2013 season (100%)	0	0	0	0	0
79	FRA	Anais Ventard	688	2011/2012 season (70%)	0	84	84	0	0
80	USA	Hannah Miller	682	2013/2014 season (100%)	0	0	0	0	0
80	USA	Hannah Miller	682	2012/2013 season (100%)	0	315	225	0	0
80	USA	Hannah Miller	682	2011/2012 season (70%)	0	142	0	0	0
81	JPN	Miu Sato	676	2013/2014 season (100%)	0	0	0	0	0
81	JPN	Miu Sato	676	2012/2013 season (100%)	0	164	148	0	0
81	JPN	Miu Sato	676	2011/2012 season (70%)	110	127	127	0	0
82	BEL	Kaat Van Daele	671	2013/2014 season (100%)	113	0	0	0	0
82	BEL	Kaat Van Daele	671	2012/2013 season (100%)	140	0	0	164	0
82	BEL	Kaat Van Daele	671	2011/2012 season (70%)	0	0	0	127	127
83	USA	Karen Chen	668	2013/2014 season (100%)	215	250	203	0	0
83	USA	Karen Chen	668	2012/2013 season (100%)	0	0	0	0	0
83	USA	Karen Chen	668	2011/2012 season (70%)	0	0	0	0	0
84	RUS	Maria Stavitskaia	665	2013/2014 season (100%)	0	0	0	225	0
84	RUS	Maria Stavitskaia	665	2012/2013 season (100%)	0	203	133	0	0
84	RUS	Maria Stavitskaia	665	2011/2012 season (70%)	0	104	0	0	0
85	KOR	Da Bin Choi	641	2013/2014 season (100%)	295	182	164	0	0
85	KOR	Da Bin Choi	641	2012/2013 season (100%)	0	0	0	0	0
85	KOR	Da Bin Choi	641	2011/2012 season (70%)	0	0	0	0	0
86	CAN	Veronik Mallet	610	2013/2014 season (100%)	237	191	0	182	0
86	CAN	Veronik Mallet	610	2012/2013 season (100%)	0	0	0	0	0
86	CAN	Veronik Mallet	610	2011/2012 season (70%)	0	0	0	0	0
87	BRA	Isadora Williams	603	2013/2014 season (100%)	0	0	0	164	0
87	BRA	Isadora Williams	603	2012/2013 season (100%)	0	0	0	203	164
87	BRA	Isadora Williams	603	2011/2012 season (70%)	72	0	0	0	0
88	POL	Agata Kryger	602	2013/2014 season (100%)	102	0	0	250	250
88	POL	Agata Kryger	602	2012/2013 season (100%)	0	0	0	0	0
88	POL	Agata Kryger	602	2011/2012 season (70%)	0	0	0	0	0
89	USA	Ashley Cain	586	2013/2014 season (100%)	0	0	0	203	0
89	USA	Ashley Cain	586	2012/2013 season (100%)	0	164	0	0	0
89	USA	Ashley Cain	586	2011/2012 season (70%)	0	115	104	0	0
90	RUS	Maria Sotskova	575	2013/2014 season (100%)	0	350	225	0	0
90	RUS	Maria Sotskova	575	2012/2013 season (100%)	0	0	0	0	0
90	RUS	Maria Sotskova	575	2011/2012 season (70%)	0	0	0	0	0
91	JPN	Risa Shoji	567	2013/2014 season (100%)	0	0	0	0	0
91	JPN	Risa Shoji	567	2012/2013 season (100%)	0	0	0	203	0
91	JPN	Risa Shoji	567	2011/2012 season (70%)	48	158	158	0	0
92	NOR	Anine Rabe	565	2013/2014 season (100%)	0	0	0	225	0
92	NOR	Anine Rabe	565	2012/2013 season (100%)	0	0	0	225	0
92	NOR	Anine Rabe	565	2011/2012 season (70%)	0	0	0	115	0
93	KAZ	Elizabet Turzynbaeva	563	2013/2014 season (100%)	174	225	164	0	0
93	KAZ	Elizabet Turzynbaeva	563	2012/2013 season (100%)	0	0	0	0	0
93	KAZ	Elizabet Turzynbaeva	563	2011/2012 season (70%)	0	0	0	0	0
94	JPN	Yuki Nishino	558	2013/2014 season (100%)	0	0	0	0	0
94	JPN	Yuki Nishino	558	2012/2013 season (100%)	0	0	0	0	0
94	JPN	Yuki Nishino	558	2011/2012 season (70%)	0	127	115	158	158
95	SLO	Patricia Glešcic	537	2013/2014 season (100%)	0	0	0	0	0
95	SLO	Patricia Glešcic	537	2012/2013 season (100%)	0	0	0	182	0
95	SLO	Patricia Glešcic	537	2011/2012 season (70%)	65	0	0	175	115
96	KOR	Na Hyun Kim	522	2013/2014 season (100%)	194	164	164	0	0
96	KOR	Na Hyun Kim	522	2012/2013 season (100%)	0	0	0	0	0
96	KOR	Na Hyun Kim	522	2011/2012 season (70%)	0	0	0	0	0
97	RUS	Maria Artemieva	519	2013/2014 season (100%)	0	0	0	250	0
97	RUS	Maria Artemieva	519	2012/2013 season (100%)	0	0	0	0	0
97	RUS	Maria Artemieva	519	2011/2012 season (70%)	0	0	0	142	127
98	NOR	Anne Line Gjersem	502	2013/2014 season (100%)	131	0	0	0	0
98	NOR	Anne Line Gjersem	502	2012/2013 season (100%)	92	97	0	182	0
98	NOR	Anne Line Gjersem	502	2011/2012 season (70%)	0	0	0	0	0
99	FIN	Jenni Saarinen	498	2013/2014 season (100%)	141	133	97	0	0
99	FIN	Jenni Saarinen	498	2012/2013 season (100%)	127	0	0	0	0
99	FIN	Jenni Saarinen	498	2011/2012 season (70%)	0	0	0	0	0
100	USA	Barbie Long	486	2013/2014 season (100%)	0	164	97	0	0
100	USA	Barbie Long	486	2012/2013 season (100%)	0	225	0	0	0
100	USA	Barbie Long	486	2011/2012 season (70%)	0	0	0	0	0
101	RUS	Alexandra Proklova	480	2013/2014 season (100%)	0	250	230	0	0
101	RUS	Alexandra Proklova	480	2012/2013 season (100%)	0	0	0	0	0
101	RUS	Alexandra Proklova	480	2011/2012 season (70%)	0	0	0	0	0
102	USA	Amber Glenn	469	2013/2014 season (100%)	266	203	0	0	0
102	USA	Amber Glenn	469	2012/2013 season (100%)	0	0	0	0	0
102	USA	Amber Glenn	469	2011/2012 season (70%)	0	0	0	0	0
103	CHN	Bingwa Geng	466	2013/2014 season (100%)	0	0	0	0	0
103	CHN	Bingwa Geng	466	2012/2013 season (100%)	0	0	0	0	0
103	CHN	Bingwa Geng	466	2011/2012 season (70%)	205	134	0	127	0
104	USA	Leah Keiser	457	2013/2014 season (100%)	0	0	0	0	0
104	USA	Leah Keiser	457	2012/2013 season (100%)	0	250	207	0	0
104	USA	Leah Keiser	457	2011/2012 season (70%)	0	0	0	0	0
105	SUI	Myriam Leuenberger	456	2013/2014 season (100%)	0	0	0	203	0
105	SUI	Myriam Leuenberger	456	2012/2013 season (100%)	0	0	0	182	0
105	SUI	Myriam Leuenberger	456	2011/2012 season (70%)	71	0	0	0	0
106	JPN	Miki Ando	450	2013/2014 season (100%)	0	0	0	225	225
106	JPN	Miki Ando	450	2012/2013 season (100%)	0	0	0	0	0
106	JPN	Miki Ando	450	2011/2012 season (70%)	0	0	0	0	0
107	AUS	Chantelle Kerry	443	2013/2014 season (100%)	0	120	0	0	0
107	AUS	Chantelle Kerry	443	2012/2013 season (100%)	214	0	0	0	0
107	AUS	Chantelle Kerry	443	2011/2012 season (70%)	109	0	0	0	0
108	GER	Lutricia Bock	438	2013/2014 season (100%)	157	148	133	0	0
108	GER	Lutricia Bock	438	2012/2013 season (100%)	0	0	0	0	0
108	GER	Lutricia Bock	438	2011/2012 season (70%)	0	0	0	0	0
109	USA	Yasmin Siraj	437	2013/2014 season (100%)	0	148	0	0	0
109	USA	Yasmin Siraj	437	2012/2013 season (100%)	174	0	0	0	0
109	USA	Yasmin Siraj	437	2011/2012 season (70%)	0	115	0	0	0
110	FRA	Lena Marrocco	433	2013/2014 season (100%)	0	0	0	0	0
110	FRA	Lena Marrocco	433	2012/2013 season (100%)	0	0	0	164	0
110	FRA	Lena Marrocco	433	2011/2012 season (70%)	0	0	0	142	127
111	CAN	Cynthia Phaneuf	430	2013/2014 season (100%)	0	0	0	0	0
111	CAN	Cynthia Phaneuf	430	2012/2013 season (100%)	0	0	0	0	0
111	CAN	Cynthia Phaneuf	430	2011/2012 season (70%)	281	149	0	0	0
112	AUT	Sabrina Schulz	420	2013/2014 season (100%)	0	0	0	0	0
112	AUT	Sabrina Schulz	420	2012/2013 season (100%)	49	0	0	182	0
112	AUT	Sabrina Schulz	420	2011/2012 season (70%)	31	0	0	158	0
113	IND	Ami Parekh	417	2013/2014 season (100%)	140	0	0	164	0
113	IND	Ami Parekh	417	2012/2013 season (100%)	113	0	0	0	0
113	IND	Ami Parekh	417	2011/2012 season (70%)	0	0	0	0	0
114	FIN	Beata Papp	415	2013/2014 season (100%)	0	0	0	0	0
114	FIN	Beata Papp	415	2012/2013 season (100%)	0	0	0	0	0
114	FIN	Beata Papp	415	2011/2012 season (70%)	0	93	68	127	127
115	BEL	Isabelle Pieman	412	2013/2014 season (100%)	0	0	0	182	0
115	BEL	Isabelle Pieman	412	2012/2013 season (100%)	0	0	0	0	0
115	BEL	Isabelle Pieman	412	2011/2012 season (70%)	88	0	0	142	0
116	ISR	Danielle Montalbano	407	2013/2014 season (100%)	0	0	0	225	182
116	ISR	Danielle Montalbano	407	2012/2013 season (100%)	0	0	0	0	0
116	ISR	Danielle Montalbano	407	2011/2012 season (70%)	0	0	0	0	0
117	RSA	Lejeanne Marais	406	2013/2014 season (100%)	102	0	0	0	0
117	RSA	Lejeanne Marais	406	2012/2013 season (100%)	140	0	0	164	0
117	RSA	Lejeanne Marais	406	2011/2012 season (70%)	64	0	0	0	0
118	PHI	Alisson Krystle Perticheto	403	2013/2014 season (100%)	156	0	0	0	0
118	PHI	Alisson Krystle Perticheto	403	2012/2013 season (100%)	83	0	0	164	0
118	PHI	Alisson Krystle Perticheto	403	2011/2012 season (70%)	0	0	0	0	0
119	FRA	Yretha Silete	398	2013/2014 season (100%)	0	0	0	0	0
119	FRA	Yretha Silete	398	2012/2013 season (100%)	0	0	0	0	0
119	FRA	Yretha Silete	398	2011/2012 season (70%)	264	134	0	0	0
120	ARM	Anastasia Galustyan	394	2013/2014 season (100%)	0	133	97	164	0
120	ARM	Anastasia Galustyan	394	2012/2013 season (100%)	0	0	0	0	0
120	ARM	Anastasia Galustyan	394	2011/2012 season (70%)	0	0	0	0	0
121	USA	Kiri Baga	389	2013/2014 season (100%)	0	0	0	225	0
121	USA	Kiri Baga	389	2012/2013 season (100%)	0	164	0	0	0
121	USA	Kiri Baga	389	2011/2012 season (70%)	0	0	0	0	0
121	NOR	Camilla Gjersem	389	2013/2014 season (100%)	0	0	0	225	0
121	NOR	Camilla Gjersem	389	2012/2013 season (100%)	0	0	0	164	0
121	NOR	Camilla Gjersem	389	2011/2012 season (70%)	0	0	0	0	0
123	RUS	Evgenia Gerasimova	385	2013/2014 season (100%)	0	0	0	0	0
123	RUS	Evgenia Gerasimova	385	2012/2013 season (100%)	0	203	182	0	0
123	RUS	Evgenia Gerasimova	385	2011/2012 season (70%)	0	0	0	0	0
123	GER	Sandy Hoffmann	385	2013/2014 season (100%)	0	0	0	0	0
123	GER	Sandy Hoffmann	385	2012/2013 season (100%)	0	0	0	203	182
123	GER	Sandy Hoffmann	385	2011/2012 season (70%)	0	0	0	0	0
123	JPN	Riona Kato	385	2013/2014 season (100%)	0	203	182	0	0
123	JPN	Riona Kato	385	2012/2013 season (100%)	0	0	0	0	0
123	JPN	Riona Kato	385	2011/2012 season (70%)	0	0	0	0	0
126	RUS	Anna Shershak	384	2013/2014 season (100%)	0	0	0	0	0
126	RUS	Anna Shershak	384	2012/2013 season (100%)	0	133	0	0	0
126	RUS	Anna Shershak	384	2011/2012 season (70%)	0	158	93	0	0
127	RUS	Sofia Biryukova	379	2013/2014 season (100%)	0	0	0	0	0
127	RUS	Sofia Biryukova	379	2012/2013 season (100%)	0	0	0	0	0
127	RUS	Sofia Biryukova	379	2011/2012 season (70%)	0	204	0	175	0
127	SUI	Tina Stuerzinger	379	2013/2014 season (100%)	0	0	0	0	0
127	SUI	Tina Stuerzinger	379	2012/2013 season (100%)	113	0	0	164	0
127	SUI	Tina Stuerzinger	379	2011/2012 season (70%)	34	68	0	0	0
129	RUS	Uliana Titushkina	367	2013/2014 season (100%)	0	0	0	0	0
129	RUS	Uliana Titushkina	367	2012/2013 season (100%)	0	203	164	0	0
129	RUS	Uliana Titushkina	367	2011/2012 season (70%)	0	0	0	0	0
130	LTU	Aleksandra Golovkina	364	2013/2014 season (100%)	0	0	0	182	182
130	LTU	Aleksandra Golovkina	364	2012/2013 season (100%)	0	0	0	0	0
130	LTU	Aleksandra Golovkina	364	2011/2012 season (70%)	0	0	0	0	0
131	TUR	Sıla Saygı	362	2013/2014 season (100%)	0	0	0	0	0
131	TUR	Sıla Saygı	362	2012/2013 season (100%)	83	97	0	182	0
131	TUR	Sıla Saygı	362	2011/2012 season (70%)	0	0	0	0	0
132	PHI	Melissa Bulanhagui	359	2013/2014 season (100%)	0	0	0	203	0
132	PHI	Melissa Bulanhagui	359	2012/2013 season (100%)	156	0	0	0	0
132	PHI	Melissa Bulanhagui	359	2011/2012 season (70%)	0	0	0	0	0
133	SWE	Josefine Taljegard	350	2013/2014 season (100%)	0	0	0	0	0
133	SWE	Josefine Taljegard	350	2012/2013 season (100%)	44	133	97	0	0
133	SWE	Josefine Taljegard	350	2011/2012 season (70%)	0	76	0	0	0
134	TUR	Birce Atabey	346	2013/2014 season (100%)	0	0	0	182	164
134	TUR	Birce Atabey	346	2012/2013 season (100%)	0	0	0	0	0
134	TUR	Birce Atabey	346	2011/2012 season (70%)	0	0	0	0	0
135	RUS	Natalia Ogoreltseva	345	2013/2014 season (100%)	0	225	120	0	0
135	RUS	Natalia Ogoreltseva	345	2012/2013 season (100%)	0	0	0	0	0
135	RUS	Natalia Ogoreltseva	345	2011/2012 season (70%)	0	0	0	0	0
136	JPN	Kako Tomotaki	343	2013/2014 season (100%)	0	0	0	0	0
136	JPN	Kako Tomotaki	343	2012/2013 season (100%)	0	108	0	0	0
136	JPN	Kako Tomotaki	343	2011/2012 season (70%)	0	93	0	142	0
137	USA	Mariah Bell	336	2013/2014 season (100%)	0	203	133	0	0
137	USA	Mariah Bell	336	2012/2013 season (100%)	0	0	0	0	0
137	USA	Mariah Bell	336	2011/2012 season (70%)	0	0	0	0	0
137	FIN	Liubov Efimenko	336	2013/2014 season (100%)	0	133	0	203	0
137	FIN	Liubov Efimenko	336	2012/2013 season (100%)	0	0	0	0	0
137	FIN	Liubov Efimenko	336	2011/2012 season (70%)	0	0	0	0	0
139	SVK	Alexandra Kunova	328	2013/2014 season (100%)	0	0	0	0	0
139	SVK	Alexandra Kunova	328	2012/2013 season (100%)	0	0	0	164	164
139	SVK	Alexandra Kunova	328	2011/2012 season (70%)	0	0	0	0	0
140	TPE	Crystal Kiang	305	2013/2014 season (100%)	113	0	0	0	0
140	TPE	Crystal Kiang	305	2012/2013 season (100%)	192	0	0	0	0
140	TPE	Crystal Kiang	305	2011/2012 season (70%)	58	0	0	0	0
141	LTU	Inga Janulevičiūtė	304	2013/2014 season (100%)	140	0	0	0	0
141	LTU	Inga Janulevičiūtė	304	2012/2013 season (100%)	0	0	0	164	0
141	LTU	Inga Janulevičiūtė	304	2011/2012 season (70%)	0	0	0	0	0
142	KOR	Hwi Choi	302	2013/2014 season (100%)	0	0	0	182	0
142	KOR	Hwi Choi	302	2012/2013 season (100%)	0	120	0	0	0
142	KOR	Hwi Choi	302	2011/2012 season (70%)	0	0	0	0	0
143	ESP	Marta Garcia	295	2013/2014 season (100%)	92	0	0	203	0
143	ESP	Marta Garcia	295	2012/2013 season (100%)	0	0	0	0	0
143	ESP	Marta Garcia	295	2011/2012 season (70%)	0	0	0	0	0
144	TPE	Melinda Wang	276	2013/2014 season (100%)	0	0	0	0	0
144	TPE	Melinda Wang	276	2012/2013 season (100%)	126	0	0	0	0
144	TPE	Melinda Wang	276	2011/2012 season (70%)	150	0	0	0	0
145	USA	Tyler Pierce	275	2013/2014 season (100%)	127	148	0	0	0
145	USA	Tyler Pierce	275	2012/2013 season (100%)	0	0	0	0	0
145	USA	Tyler Pierce	275	2011/2012 season (70%)	0	0	0	0	0
146	JPN	Haruna Suzuki	262	2013/2014 season (100%)	0	0	0	0	0
146	JPN	Haruna Suzuki	262	2012/2013 season (100%)	0	0	0	0	0
146	JPN	Haruna Suzuki	262	2011/2012 season (70%)	0	104	0	158	0
147	JPN	Yura Matsuda	256	2013/2014 season (100%)	0	108	0	0	0
147	JPN	Yura Matsuda	256	2012/2013 season (100%)	0	148	0	0	0
147	JPN	Yura Matsuda	256	2011/2012 season (70%)	0	0	0	0	0
148	JPN	Shion Kokubun	254	2013/2014 season (100%)	0	0	0	0	0
148	JPN	Shion Kokubun	254	2012/2013 season (100%)	0	0	0	0	0
148	JPN	Shion Kokubun	254	2011/2012 season (70%)	0	0	0	127	127
149	RUS	Valentina Chernishova	250	2013/2014 season (100%)	0	0	0	250	0
149	RUS	Valentina Chernishova	250	2012/2013 season (100%)	0	0	0	0	0
149	RUS	Valentina Chernishova	250	2011/2012 season (70%)	0	0	0	0	0
149	SWE	Rebecka Emanuelsson	250	2013/2014 season (100%)	0	0	0	250	0
149	SWE	Rebecka Emanuelsson	250	2012/2013 season (100%)	0	0	0	0	0
149	SWE	Rebecka Emanuelsson	250	2011/2012 season (70%)	0	0	0	0	0
149	JPN	Mariko Kihara	250	2013/2014 season (100%)	0	0	0	250	0
149	JPN	Mariko Kihara	250	2012/2013 season (100%)	0	0	0	0	0
149	JPN	Mariko Kihara	250	2011/2012 season (70%)	0	0	0	0	0
152	JPN	Yuka Nagai	240	2013/2014 season (100%)	0	120	0	0	0
152	JPN	Yuka Nagai	240	2012/2013 season (100%)	0	120	0	0	0
152	JPN	Yuka Nagai	240	2011/2012 season (70%)	0	0	0	0	0
153	KOR	Min-Jeong Kwak	228	2013/2014 season (100%)	0	0	0	0	0
153	KOR	Min-Jeong Kwak	228	2012/2013 season (100%)	0	0	0	0	0
153	KOR	Min-Jeong Kwak	228	2011/2012 season (70%)	228	0	0	0	0
154	RUS	Elizaveta Iushenko	225	2013/2014 season (100%)	0	225	0	0	0
154	RUS	Elizaveta Iushenko	225	2012/2013 season (100%)	0	0	0	0	0
154	RUS	Elizaveta Iushenko	225	2011/2012 season (70%)	0	0	0	0	0
155	CAN	Larkyn Austman	223	2013/2014 season (100%)	103	120	0	0	0
155	CAN	Larkyn Austman	223	2012/2013 season (100%)	0	0	0	0	0
155	CAN	Larkyn Austman	223	2011/2012 season (70%)	0	0	0	0	0
156	FIN	Alisa Mikonsaari	216	2013/2014 season (100%)	0	0	0	0	0
156	FIN	Alisa Mikonsaari	216	2012/2013 season (100%)	0	0	0	0	0
156	FIN	Alisa Mikonsaari	216	2011/2012 season (70%)	74	0	0	142	0
157	SVK	Bronislava Dobiasova	213	2013/2014 season (100%)	49	0	0	164	0
157	SVK	Bronislava Dobiasova	213	2012/2013 season (100%)	0	0	0	0	0
157	SVK	Bronislava Dobiasova	213	2011/2012 season (70%)	0	0	0	0	0
158	CAN	Kate Charbonneau	208	2013/2014 season (100%)	0	0	0	0	0
158	CAN	Kate Charbonneau	208	2012/2013 season (100%)	0	0	0	0	0
158	CAN	Kate Charbonneau	208	2011/2012 season (70%)	0	115	93	0	0
159	EST	Helery Hälvin	203	2013/2014 season (100%)	0	0	0	203	0
159	EST	Helery Hälvin	203	2012/2013 season (100%)	0	0	0	0	0
159	EST	Helery Hälvin	203	2011/2012 season (70%)	0	0	0	0	0
159	GER	Minami Hanashiro	203	2013/2014 season (100%)	0	0	0	0	0
159	GER	Minami Hanashiro	203	2012/2013 season (100%)	0	0	0	203	0
159	GER	Minami Hanashiro	203	2011/2012 season (70%)	0	0	0	0	0
159	ROU	Sabina Mariuta	203	2013/2014 season (100%)	0	0	0	0	0
159	ROU	Sabina Mariuta	203	2012/2013 season (100%)	0	0	0	203	0
159	ROU	Sabina Mariuta	203	2011/2012 season (70%)	0	0	0	0	0
159	SUI	Tanja Odermatt	203	2013/2014 season (100%)	0	0	0	203	0
159	SUI	Tanja Odermatt	203	2012/2013 season (100%)	0	0	0	0	0
159	SUI	Tanja Odermatt	203	2011/2012 season (70%)	0	0	0	0	0
163	LAT	Alina Fjodorova	197	2013/2014 season (100%)	0	0	0	0	0
163	LAT	Alina Fjodorova	197	2012/2013 season (100%)	0	0	0	0	0
163	LAT	Alina Fjodorova	197	2011/2012 season (70%)	121	76	0	0	0
164	CHN	Ying Zhang	191	2013/2014 season (100%)	0	0	0	0	0
164	CHN	Ying Zhang	191	2012/2013 season (100%)	0	191	0	0	0
164	CHN	Ying Zhang	191	2011/2012 season (70%)	0	0	0	0	0
165	UKR	Anna Khnychenkova	186	2013/2014 season (100%)	93	0	0	0	0
165	UKR	Anna Khnychenkova	186	2012/2013 season (100%)	93	0	0	0	0
165	UKR	Anna Khnychenkova	186	2011/2012 season (70%)	0	0	0	0	0
165	KOR	Chae-Yeon Suhr	186	2013/2014 season (100%)	0	0	0	0	0
165	KOR	Chae-Yeon Suhr	186	2012/2013 season (100%)	0	0	0	0	0
165	KOR	Chae-Yeon Suhr	186	2011/2012 season (70%)	71	0	0	115	0
167	PUR	Victoria Muniz	185	2013/2014 season (100%)	0	0	0	0	0
167	PUR	Victoria Muniz	185	2012/2013 season (100%)	0	0	0	0	0
167	PUR	Victoria Muniz	185	2011/2012 season (70%)	185	0	0	0	0
168	ITA	Caterina Andermarcher	182	2013/2014 season (100%)	0	0	0	182	0
168	ITA	Caterina Andermarcher	182	2012/2013 season (100%)	0	0	0	0	0
168	ITA	Caterina Andermarcher	182	2011/2012 season (70%)	0	0	0	0	0
168	SUI	Eveline Brunner	182	2013/2014 season (100%)	0	0	0	182	0
168	SUI	Eveline Brunner	182	2012/2013 season (100%)	0	0	0	0	0
168	SUI	Eveline Brunner	182	2011/2012 season (70%)	0	0	0	0	0
168	NED	Michelle Couwenberg	182	2013/2014 season (100%)	0	0	0	0	0
168	NED	Michelle Couwenberg	182	2012/2013 season (100%)	0	0	0	182	0
168	NED	Michelle Couwenberg	182	2011/2012 season (70%)	0	0	0	0	0
168	ITA	Micol Cristini	182	2013/2014 season (100%)	0	0	0	182	0
168	ITA	Micol Cristini	182	2012/2013 season (100%)	0	0	0	0	0
168	ITA	Micol Cristini	182	2011/2012 season (70%)	0	0	0	0	0
168	EST	Svetlana Issakova	182	2013/2014 season (100%)	0	0	0	0	0
168	EST	Svetlana Issakova	182	2012/2013 season (100%)	0	0	0	182	0
168	EST	Svetlana Issakova	182	2011/2012 season (70%)	0	0	0	0	0
168	FIN	Rosaliina Kuparinen	182	2013/2014 season (100%)	0	0	0	0	0
168	FIN	Rosaliina Kuparinen	182	2012/2013 season (100%)	0	0	0	182	0
168	FIN	Rosaliina Kuparinen	182	2011/2012 season (70%)	0	0	0	0	0
168	RUS	Svetlana Lebedava	182	2013/2014 season (100%)	0	0	0	182	0
168	RUS	Svetlana Lebedava	182	2012/2013 season (100%)	0	0	0	0	0
168	RUS	Svetlana Lebedava	182	2011/2012 season (70%)	0	0	0	0	0
168	FIN	Leena Rissanen	182	2013/2014 season (100%)	0	0	0	0	0
168	FIN	Leena Rissanen	182	2012/2013 season (100%)	0	0	0	182	0
168	FIN	Leena Rissanen	182	2011/2012 season (70%)	0	0	0	0	0
168	ITA	Guia Maria Tagliapietra	182	2013/2014 season (100%)	0	0	0	182	0
168	ITA	Guia Maria Tagliapietra	182	2012/2013 season (100%)	0	0	0	0	0
168	ITA	Guia Maria Tagliapietra	182	2011/2012 season (70%)	0	0	0	0	0
177	CHN	Xiaowen Guo	175	2013/2014 season (100%)	0	0	0	0	0
177	CHN	Xiaowen Guo	175	2012/2013 season (100%)	55	120	0	0	0
177	CHN	Xiaowen Guo	175	2011/2012 season (70%)	0	0	0	0	0
178	KOR	Tae Kyung Kim	173	2013/2014 season (100%)	173	0	0	0	0
178	KOR	Tae Kyung Kim	173	2012/2013 season (100%)	0	0	0	0	0
178	KOR	Tae Kyung Kim	173	2011/2012 season (70%)	0	0	0	0	0
178	KOR	Yeon Jun Park	173	2013/2014 season (100%)	0	0	0	0	0
178	KOR	Yeon Jun Park	173	2012/2013 season (100%)	173	0	0	0	0
178	KOR	Yeon Jun Park	173	2011/2012 season (70%)	0	0	0	0	0
180	CAN	Alexandra Najarro	166	2013/2014 season (100%)	0	0	0	0	0
180	CAN	Alexandra Najarro	166	2012/2013 season (100%)	0	0	0	0	0
180	CAN	Alexandra Najarro	166	2011/2012 season (70%)	166	0	0	0	0
181	ITA	Sara Casella	164	2013/2014 season (100%)	0	0	0	164	0
181	ITA	Sara Casella	164	2012/2013 season (100%)	0	0	0	0	0
181	ITA	Sara Casella	164	2011/2012 season (70%)	0	0	0	0	0
181	ESP	Monica Gimeno	164	2013/2014 season (100%)	0	0	0	0	0
181	ESP	Monica Gimeno	164	2012/2013 season (100%)	0	0	0	164	0
181	ESP	Monica Gimeno	164	2011/2012 season (70%)	0	0	0	0	0
181	SUI	Nicole Graf	164	2013/2014 season (100%)	0	0	0	164	0
181	SUI	Nicole Graf	164	2012/2013 season (100%)	0	0	0	0	0
181	SUI	Nicole Graf	164	2011/2012 season (70%)	0	0	0	0	0
181	BLR	Janina Makeenka	164	2013/2014 season (100%)	0	0	0	164	0
181	BLR	Janina Makeenka	164	2012/2013 season (100%)	0	0	0	0	0
181	BLR	Janina Makeenka	164	2011/2012 season (70%)	0	0	0	0	0
181	JPN	Mai Mihara	164	2013/2014 season (100%)	0	164	0	0	0
181	JPN	Mai Mihara	164	2012/2013 season (100%)	0	0	0	0	0
181	JPN	Mai Mihara	164	2011/2012 season (70%)	0	0	0	0	0
181	UKR	Alina Milevskaia	164	2013/2014 season (100%)	0	0	0	0	0
181	UKR	Alina Milevskaia	164	2012/2013 season (100%)	0	0	0	164	0
181	UKR	Alina Milevskaia	164	2011/2012 season (70%)	0	0	0	0	0
181	JPN	Satsuki Muramoto	164	2013/2014 season (100%)	0	0	0	0	0
181	JPN	Satsuki Muramoto	164	2012/2013 season (100%)	0	0	0	164	0
181	JPN	Satsuki Muramoto	164	2011/2012 season (70%)	0	0	0	0	0
181	GER	Jennifer Parker	164	2013/2014 season (100%)	0	0	0	164	0
181	GER	Jennifer Parker	164	2012/2013 season (100%)	0	0	0	0	0
181	GER	Jennifer Parker	164	2011/2012 season (70%)	0	0	0	0	0
181	SRB	Mila Petrovic	164	2013/2014 season (100%)	0	0	0	164	0
181	SRB	Mila Petrovic	164	2012/2013 season (100%)	0	0	0	0	0
181	SRB	Mila Petrovic	164	2011/2012 season (70%)	0	0	0	0	0
181	AUT	Belinda Schönberger	164	2013/2014 season (100%)	0	0	0	0	0
181	AUT	Belinda Schönberger	164	2012/2013 season (100%)	0	0	0	164	0
181	AUT	Belinda Schönberger	164	2011/2012 season (70%)	0	0	0	0	0
181	SLO	Pina Umek	164	2013/2014 season (100%)	0	0	0	0	0
181	SLO	Pina Umek	164	2012/2013 season (100%)	0	0	0	164	0
181	SLO	Pina Umek	164	2011/2012 season (70%)	0	0	0	0	0
192	JPN	Shoko Ishikawa	158	2013/2014 season (100%)	0	0	0	0	0
192	JPN	Shoko Ishikawa	158	2012/2013 season (100%)	0	0	0	0	0
192	JPN	Shoko Ishikawa	158	2011/2012 season (70%)	0	0	0	158	0
193	CAN	Madelyn Dunley	148	2013/2014 season (100%)	0	148	0	0	0
193	CAN	Madelyn Dunley	148	2012/2013 season (100%)	0	0	0	0	0
193	CAN	Madelyn Dunley	148	2011/2012 season (70%)	0	0	0	0	0
193	JPN	Hinano Isobe	148	2013/2014 season (100%)	0	0	0	0	0
193	JPN	Hinano Isobe	148	2012/2013 season (100%)	0	148	0	0	0
193	JPN	Hinano Isobe	148	2011/2012 season (70%)	0	0	0	0	0
193	HKG	Maisy Hiu Ching Ma	148	2013/2014 season (100%)	0	148	0	0	0
193	HKG	Maisy Hiu Ching Ma	148	2012/2013 season (100%)	0	0	0	0	0
193	HKG	Maisy Hiu Ching Ma	148	2011/2012 season (70%)	0	0	0	0	0
193	JPN	Kaori Sakamoto	148	2013/2014 season (100%)	0	148	0	0	0
193	JPN	Kaori Sakamoto	148	2012/2013 season (100%)	0	0	0	0	0
193	JPN	Kaori Sakamoto	148	2011/2012 season (70%)	0	0	0	0	0
197	LAT	Angelina Kuchvalska	143	2013/2014 season (100%)	75	0	0	0	0
197	LAT	Angelina Kuchvalska	143	2012/2013 season (100%)	68	0	0	0	0
197	LAT	Angelina Kuchvalska	143	2011/2012 season (70%)	0	0	0	0	0
198	SWE	Linnea Mellgren	142	2013/2014 season (100%)	0	0	0	0	0
198	SWE	Linnea Mellgren	142	2012/2013 season (100%)	0	0	0	0	0
198	SWE	Linnea Mellgren	142	2011/2012 season (70%)	0	0	0	142	0
198	JPN	Kana Muramoto	142	2013/2014 season (100%)	0	0	0	0	0
198	JPN	Kana Muramoto	142	2012/2013 season (100%)	0	0	0	0	0
198	JPN	Kana Muramoto	142	2011/2012 season (70%)	0	0	0	142	0
200	USA	Joelle Forte	134	2013/2014 season (100%)	0	0	0	0	0
200	USA	Joelle Forte	134	2012/2013 season (100%)	0	0	0	0	0
200	USA	Joelle Forte	134	2011/2012 season (70%)	0	134	0	0	0
200	THA	Sandra Khopon	134	2013/2014 season (100%)	0	0	0	0	0
200	THA	Sandra Khopon	134	2012/2013 season (100%)	0	0	0	0	0
200	THA	Sandra Khopon	134	2011/2012 season (70%)	134	0	0	0	0
202	RUS	Alsu Kaiumova	133	2013/2014 season (100%)	0	133	0	0	0
202	RUS	Alsu Kaiumova	133	2012/2013 season (100%)	0	0	0	0	0
202	RUS	Alsu Kaiumova	133	2011/2012 season (70%)	0	0	0	0	0
203	CRO	Mirna Libric	127	2013/2014 season (100%)	0	0	0	0	0
203	CRO	Mirna Libric	127	2012/2013 season (100%)	0	0	0	0	0
203	CRO	Mirna Libric	127	2011/2012 season (70%)	0	0	0	127	0
204	CHN	Qiuying Zhu	121	2013/2014 season (100%)	0	0	0	0	0
204	CHN	Qiuying Zhu	121	2012/2013 season (100%)	0	0	0	0	0
204	CHN	Qiuying Zhu	121	2011/2012 season (70%)	121	0	0	0	0
205	JPN	Mayako Matsuno	120	2013/2014 season (100%)	0	0	0	0	0
205	JPN	Mayako Matsuno	120	2012/2013 season (100%)	0	120	0	0	0
205	JPN	Mayako Matsuno	120	2011/2012 season (70%)	0	0	0	0	0
206	EST	Jasmine Alexandra Costa	115	2013/2014 season (100%)	0	0	0	0	0
206	EST	Jasmine Alexandra Costa	115	2012/2013 season (100%)	0	0	0	0	0
206	EST	Jasmine Alexandra Costa	115	2011/2012 season (70%)	0	0	0	115	0
206	USA	Katarina Kulgeyko	115	2013/2014 season (100%)	0	0	0	0	0
206	USA	Katarina Kulgeyko	115	2012/2013 season (100%)	0	0	0	0	0
206	USA	Katarina Kulgeyko	115	2011/2012 season (70%)	0	115	0	0	0
206	FIN	Minna Parviainen	115	2013/2014 season (100%)	0	0	0	0	0
206	FIN	Minna Parviainen	115	2012/2013 season (100%)	0	0	0	0	0
206	FIN	Minna Parviainen	115	2011/2012 season (70%)	0	0	0	115	0
206	NED	Larissa Van Der Linden	115	2013/2014 season (100%)	0	0	0	0	0
206	NED	Larissa Van Der Linden	115	2012/2013 season (100%)	0	0	0	0	0
206	NED	Larissa Van Der Linden	115	2011/2012 season (70%)	0	0	0	115	0
206	GER	Katharina Zientek	115	2013/2014 season (100%)	0	0	0	0	0
206	GER	Katharina Zientek	115	2012/2013 season (100%)	0	0	0	0	0
206	GER	Katharina Zientek	115	2011/2012 season (70%)	0	0	0	115	0
211	CAN	Julianne Delaurier	108	2013/2014 season (100%)	0	108	0	0	0
211	CAN	Julianne Delaurier	108	2012/2013 season (100%)	0	0	0	0	0
211	CAN	Julianne Delaurier	108	2011/2012 season (70%)	0	0	0	0	0
211	KOR	Kyueun Kim	108	2013/2014 season (100%)	0	108	0	0	0
211	KOR	Kyueun Kim	108	2012/2013 season (100%)	0	0	0	0	0
211	KOR	Kyueun Kim	108	2011/2012 season (70%)	0	0	0	0	0
211	CAN	Sandrine Martin	108	2013/2014 season (100%)	0	108	0	0	0
211	CAN	Sandrine Martin	108	2012/2013 season (100%)	0	0	0	0	0
211	CAN	Sandrine Martin	108	2011/2012 season (70%)	0	0	0	0	0
211	FIN	Eveliina Viljanen	108	2013/2014 season (100%)	0	0	0	0	0
211	FIN	Eveliina Viljanen	108	2012/2013 season (100%)	0	108	0	0	0
211	FIN	Eveliina Viljanen	108	2011/2012 season (70%)	0	0	0	0	0
211	CHN	Jialei Wang	108	2013/2014 season (100%)	0	0	0	0	0
211	CHN	Jialei Wang	108	2012/2013 season (100%)	0	108	0	0	0
211	CHN	Jialei Wang	108	2011/2012 season (70%)	0	0	0	0	0
216	USA	Lauren Dinh	104	2013/2014 season (100%)	0	0	0	0	0
216	USA	Lauren Dinh	104	2012/2013 season (100%)	0	0	0	0	0
216	USA	Lauren Dinh	104	2011/2012 season (70%)	0	104	0	0	0
216	JPN	Yukiko Fujisawa	104	2013/2014 season (100%)	0	0	0	0	0
216	JPN	Yukiko Fujisawa	104	2012/2013 season (100%)	0	0	0	0	0
216	JPN	Yukiko Fujisawa	104	2011/2012 season (70%)	0	104	0	0	0
218	THA	Mimi Tanasorn Chindasook	98	2013/2014 season (100%)	0	0	0	0	0
218	THA	Mimi Tanasorn Chindasook	98	2012/2013 season (100%)	0	0	0	0	0
218	THA	Mimi Tanasorn Chindasook	98	2011/2012 season (70%)	98	0	0	0	0
219	GER	Maria-Katharina Herceg	97	2013/2014 season (100%)	0	97	0	0	0
219	GER	Maria-Katharina Herceg	97	2012/2013 season (100%)	0	0	0	0	0
219	GER	Maria-Katharina Herceg	97	2011/2012 season (70%)	0	0	0	0	0
219	CHN	Xiangning Li	97	2013/2014 season (100%)	0	97	0	0	0
219	CHN	Xiangning Li	97	2012/2013 season (100%)	0	0	0	0	0
219	CHN	Xiangning Li	97	2011/2012 season (70%)	0	0	0	0	0
221	KOR	Yea-Ji Yun	88	2013/2014 season (100%)	0	0	0	0	0
221	KOR	Yea-Ji Yun	88	2012/2013 season (100%)	0	0	0	0	0
221	KOR	Yea-Ji Yun	88	2011/2012 season (70%)	88	0	0	0	0
222	SUI	Romy Bühler	83	2013/2014 season (100%)	0	0	0	0	0
222	SUI	Romy Bühler	83	2012/2013 season (100%)	0	0	0	0	0
222	SUI	Romy Bühler	83	2011/2012 season (70%)	83	0	0	0	0
222	DEN	Pernille Sorensen	83	2013/2014 season (100%)	83	0	0	0	0
222	DEN	Pernille Sorensen	83	2012/2013 season (100%)	0	0	0	0	0
222	DEN	Pernille Sorensen	83	2011/2012 season (70%)	0	0	0	0	0
224	THA	Melanie Swang	79	2013/2014 season (100%)	0	0	0	0	0
224	THA	Melanie Swang	79	2012/2013 season (100%)	0	0	0	0	0
224	THA	Melanie Swang	79	2011/2012 season (70%)	79	0	0	0	0
225	AUT	Victoria Huebler	76	2013/2014 season (100%)	0	0	0	0	0
225	AUT	Victoria Huebler	76	2012/2013 season (100%)	0	0	0	0	0
225	AUT	Victoria Huebler	76	2011/2012 season (70%)	0	76	0	0	0
225	POL	Alexandra Kamieniecki	76	2013/2014 season (100%)	0	0	0	0	0
225	POL	Alexandra Kamieniecki	76	2012/2013 season (100%)	0	0	0	0	0
225	POL	Alexandra Kamieniecki	76	2011/2012 season (70%)	0	76	0	0	0
225	CAN	Natasha Purich	76	2013/2014 season (100%)	0	0	0	0	0
225	CAN	Natasha Purich	76	2012/2013 season (100%)	0	0	0	0	0
225	CAN	Natasha Purich	76	2011/2012 season (70%)	0	76	0	0	0
228	USA	McKinzie Daniels	68	2013/2014 season (100%)	0	0	0	0	0
228	USA	McKinzie Daniels	68	2012/2013 season (100%)	0	0	0	0	0
228	USA	McKinzie Daniels	68	2011/2012 season (70%)	0	68	0	0	0
228	RUS	Alexandra Deeva	68	2013/2014 season (100%)	0	0	0	0	0
228	RUS	Alexandra Deeva	68	2012/2013 season (100%)	0	0	0	0	0
228	RUS	Alexandra Deeva	68	2011/2012 season (70%)	0	68	0	0	0
228	JPN	Saya Ueno	68	2013/2014 season (100%)	0	0	0	0	0
228	JPN	Saya Ueno	68	2012/2013 season (100%)	0	0	0	0	0
228	JPN	Saya Ueno	68	2011/2012 season (70%)	0	68	0	0	0
231	SUI	Matilde Gianocca	61	2013/2014 season (100%)	61	0	0	0	0
231	SUI	Matilde Gianocca	61	2012/2013 season (100%)	0	0	0	0	0
231	SUI	Matilde Gianocca	61	2011/2012 season (70%)	0	0	0	0	0
231	HUN	Ivett Tóth	61	2013/2014 season (100%)	0	0	0	0	0
231	HUN	Ivett Tóth	61	2012/2013 season (100%)	61	0	0	0	0
231	HUN	Ivett Tóth	61	2011/2012 season (70%)	0	0	0	0	0
233	LTU	Deimante Kizalaite	55	2013/2014 season (100%)	55	0	0	0	0
233	LTU	Deimante Kizalaite	55	2012/2013 season (100%)	0	0	0	0	0
233	LTU	Deimante Kizalaite	55	2011/2012 season (70%)	0	0	0	0	0
234	PHI	Zhaira Costiniano	52	2013/2014 season (100%)	0	0	0	0	0
234	PHI	Zhaira Costiniano	52	2012/2013 season (100%)	0	0	0	0	0
234	PHI	Zhaira Costiniano	52	2011/2012 season (70%)	52	0	0	0	0

==== Pairs (88 couples) ====
As of 27 March 2014

Rank	Nation	Couple	Points	Season	ISU Championships or Olympics	(Junior) Grand Prix and Final		Selected International Competition	
Rank	Nation	Couple	Points	Season	Best	Best	2nd Best	Best	2nd Best
1	RUS	Tatiana Volosozhar / Maxim Trankov	5674	2013/2014 season (100%)	1200	720	400	250	0
1	RUS	Tatiana Volosozhar / Maxim Trankov	5674	2012/2013 season (100%)	1200	800	400	250	0
1	RUS	Tatiana Volosozhar / Maxim Trankov	5674	2011/2012 season (70%)	756	504	280	175	175
2	GER	Aliona Savchenko / Robin Szolkowy	4690	2013/2014 season (100%)	1200	800	400	0	0
2	GER	Aliona Savchenko / Robin Szolkowy	4690	2012/2013 season (100%)	1080	400	0	250	0
2	GER	Aliona Savchenko / Robin Szolkowy	4690	2011/2012 season (70%)	840	560	280	0	0
3	CAN	Kirsten Moore-Towers / Dylan Moscovitch	3967	2013/2014 season (100%)	875	472	360	250	0
3	CAN	Kirsten Moore-Towers / Dylan Moscovitch	3967	2012/2013 season (100%)	875	525	360	250	0
3	CAN	Kirsten Moore-Towers / Dylan Moscovitch	3967	2011/2012 season (70%)	0	227	227	0	0
4	CAN	Meagan Duhamel / Eric Radford	3780	2013/2014 season (100%)	972	525	360	0	0
4	CAN	Meagan Duhamel / Eric Radford	3780	2012/2013 season (100%)	972	583	360	0	0
4	CAN	Meagan Duhamel / Eric Radford	3780	2011/2012 season (70%)	551	368	227	0	0
5	CHN	Qing Pang / Jian Tong	3758	2013/2014 season (100%)	875	648	400	0	0
5	CHN	Qing Pang / Jian Tong	3758	2012/2013 season (100%)	787	648	400	0	0
5	CHN	Qing Pang / Jian Tong	3758	2011/2012 season (70%)	613	0	0	0	0
6	RUS	Ksenia Stolbova / Fedor Klimov	3503	2013/2014 season (100%)	1080	324	292	250	0
6	RUS	Ksenia Stolbova / Fedor Klimov	3503	2012/2013 season (100%)	496	324	262	250	225
6	RUS	Ksenia Stolbova / Fedor Klimov	3503	2011/2012 season (70%)	476	204	149	0	0
7	ITA	Stefania Berton / Ondrej Hotárek	3502	2013/2014 season (100%)	612	400	262	250	250
7	ITA	Stefania Berton / Ondrej Hotárek	3502	2012/2013 season (100%)	680	324	324	225	0
7	ITA	Stefania Berton / Ondrej Hotárek	3502	2011/2012 season (70%)	428	227	204	175	158
8	RUS	Vera Bazarova / Yuri Larionov	3277	2013/2014 season (100%)	709	360	292	0	0
8	RUS	Vera Bazarova / Yuri Larionov	3277	2012/2013 season (100%)	638	720	400	0	0
8	RUS	Vera Bazarova / Yuri Larionov	3277	2011/2012 season (70%)	529	252	183	158	0
9	USA	Marissa Castelli / Simon Shnapir	2870	2013/2014 season (100%)	517	292	236	182	0
9	USA	Marissa Castelli / Simon Shnapir	2870	2012/2013 season (100%)	680	324	262	250	0
9	USA	Marissa Castelli / Simon Shnapir	2870	2011/2012 season (70%)	0	149	0	127	0
10	CHN	Cheng Peng / Hao Zhang	2835	2013/2014 season (100%)	787	583	360	0	0
10	CHN	Cheng Peng / Hao Zhang	2835	2012/2013 season (100%)	551	292	262	0	0
10	CHN	Cheng Peng / Hao Zhang	2835	2011/2012 season (70%)	0	0	0	0	0
11	FRA	Vanessa James / Morgan Ciprès	2770	2013/2014 season (100%)	551	262	0	0	0
11	FRA	Vanessa James / Morgan Ciprès	2770	2012/2013 season (100%)	612	292	236	250	203
11	FRA	Vanessa James / Morgan Ciprès	2770	2011/2012 season (70%)	347	134	0	115	115
12	RUS	Yuko Kavaguti / Alexander Smirnov	2762	2013/2014 season (100%)	0	0	0	0	0
12	RUS	Yuko Kavaguti / Alexander Smirnov	2762	2012/2013 season (100%)	709	472	400	0	0
12	RUS	Yuko Kavaguti / Alexander Smirnov	2762	2011/2012 season (70%)	447	454	280	0	0
13	CHN	Wenjing Sui / Cong Han	2609	2013/2014 season (100%)	840	360	324	0	0
13	CHN	Wenjing Sui / Cong Han	2609	2012/2013 season (100%)	377	0	0	0	0
13	CHN	Wenjing Sui / Cong Han	2609	2011/2012 season (70%)	588	252	245	0	0
14	CAN	Paige Lawrence / Rudi Swiegers	2489	2013/2014 season (100%)	377	292	236	164	0
14	CAN	Paige Lawrence / Rudi Swiegers	2489	2012/2013 season (100%)	496	292	292	225	0
14	CAN	Paige Lawrence / Rudi Swiegers	2489	2011/2012 season (70%)	312	134	0	115	0
15	USA	Alexa Scimeca / Chris Knierim	2440	2013/2014 season (100%)	680	262	236	203	0
15	USA	Alexa Scimeca / Chris Knierim	2440	2012/2013 season (100%)	517	292	0	250	0
15	USA	Alexa Scimeca / Chris Knierim	2440	2011/2012 season (70%)	0	0	0	0	0
16	USA	Caydee Denney / John Coughlin	2385	2013/2014 season (100%)	0	324	292	225	0
16	USA	Caydee Denney / John Coughlin	2385	2012/2013 season (100%)	0	324	324	225	0
16	USA	Caydee Denney / John Coughlin	2385	2011/2012 season (70%)	529	204	183	142	0
17	USA	Haven Denney / Brandon Frazier	2093	2013/2014 season (100%)	612	262	262	182	0
17	USA	Haven Denney / Brandon Frazier	2093	2012/2013 season (100%)	500	182	0	0	0
17	USA	Haven Denney / Brandon Frazier	2093	2011/2012 season (70%)	256	93	84	0	0
18	FRA	Daria Popova / Bruno Massot	2042	2013/2014 season (100%)	293	191	0	164	0
18	FRA	Daria Popova / Bruno Massot	2042	2012/2013 season (100%)	446	262	213	182	164
18	FRA	Daria Popova / Bruno Massot	2042	2011/2012 season (70%)	281	0	0	127	0
19	CHN	Xiaoyu Yu / Yang Jin	1920	2013/2014 season (100%)	500	350	250	0	0
19	CHN	Xiaoyu Yu / Yang Jin	1920	2012/2013 season (100%)	365	230	225	0	0
19	CHN	Xiaoyu Yu / Yang Jin	1920	2011/2012 season (70%)	315	165	161	0	0
20	ITA	Nicole Della Monica / Matteo Guarise	1890	2013/2014 season (100%)	402	191	0	164	0
20	ITA	Nicole Della Monica / Matteo Guarise	1890	2012/2013 season (100%)	362	213	213	203	0
20	ITA	Nicole Della Monica / Matteo Guarise	1890	2011/2012 season (70%)	193	0	0	142	0
21	CAN	Margaret Purdy / Michael Marinaro	1833	2013/2014 season (100%)	496	191	191	0	0
21	CAN	Margaret Purdy / Michael Marinaro	1833	2012/2013 season (100%)	450	255	250	0	0
21	CAN	Margaret Purdy / Michael Marinaro	1833	2011/2012 season (70%)	230	142	68	0	0
22	RUS	Vasilisa Davankova / Andrei Deputat	1826	2013/2014 season (100%)	365	230	225	0	0
22	RUS	Vasilisa Davankova / Andrei Deputat	1826	2012/2013 season (100%)	0	315	225	182	0
22	RUS	Vasilisa Davankova / Andrei Deputat	1826	2011/2012 season (70%)	284	0	0	0	0
23	GER	Mari Vartmann / Aaron Van Cleave	1813	2013/2014 season (100%)	362	213	0	203	203
23	GER	Mari Vartmann / Aaron Van Cleave	1813	2012/2013 season (100%)	402	0	0	203	203
23	GER	Mari Vartmann / Aaron Van Cleave	1813	2011/2012 season (70%)	386	0	0	175	158
24	RUS	Lina Fedorova / Maxim Miroshkin	1764	2013/2014 season (100%)	0	284	250	225	0
24	RUS	Lina Fedorova / Maxim Miroshkin	1764	2012/2013 season (100%)	405	350	250	0	0
24	RUS	Lina Fedorova / Maxim Miroshkin	1764	2011/2012 season (70%)	0	115	0	0	0
25	GER	Maylin Wende / Daniel Wende	1694	2013/2014 season (100%)	496	0	0	225	225
25	GER	Maylin Wende / Daniel Wende	1694	2012/2013 season (100%)	0	0	0	0	0
25	GER	Maylin Wende / Daniel Wende	1694	2011/2012 season (70%)	312	134	0	175	127
26	USA	Felicia Zhang / Nathan Bartholomay	1620	2013/2014 season (100%)	377	236	213	0	0
26	USA	Felicia Zhang / Nathan Bartholomay	1620	2012/2013 season (100%)	612	0	0	182	0
26	USA	Felicia Zhang / Nathan Bartholomay	1620	2011/2012 season (70%)	0	0	0	0	0
27	RUS	Evgenia Tarasova / Vladimir Morozov	1604	2013/2014 season (100%)	450	255	225	0	0
27	RUS	Evgenia Tarasova / Vladimir Morozov	1604	2012/2013 season (100%)	328	164	0	182	0
27	RUS	Evgenia Tarasova / Vladimir Morozov	1604	2011/2012 season (70%)	0	0	0	0	0
28	RUS	Anastasia Martiusheva / Alexei Rogonov	1575	2013/2014 season (100%)	0	213	213	225	225
28	RUS	Anastasia Martiusheva / Alexei Rogonov	1575	2012/2013 season (100%)	0	262	262	0	0
28	RUS	Anastasia Martiusheva / Alexei Rogonov	1575	2011/2012 season (70%)	0	0	0	175	0
29	RUS	Julia Antipova / Nodari Maisuradze	1493	2013/2014 season (100%)	574	262	0	250	182
29	RUS	Julia Antipova / Nodari Maisuradze	1493	2012/2013 season (100%)	0	0	0	225	0
29	RUS	Julia Antipova / Nodari Maisuradze	1493	2011/2012 season (70%)	0	0	0	0	0
30	RUS	Maria Vigalova / Egor Zakroev	1479	2013/2014 season (100%)	405	315	250	0	0
30	RUS	Maria Vigalova / Egor Zakroev	1479	2012/2013 season (100%)	0	284	225	0	0
30	RUS	Maria Vigalova / Egor Zakroev	1479	2011/2012 season (70%)	0	0	0	0	0
31	USA	Tarah Kayne / Danny O'Shea	1387	2013/2014 season (100%)	756	0	0	203	203
31	USA	Tarah Kayne / Danny O'Shea	1387	2012/2013 season (100%)	0	0	0	225	0
31	USA	Tarah Kayne / Danny O'Shea	1387	2011/2012 season (70%)	0	0	0	0	0
32	GER	Annabelle Prölss / Ruben Blommaert	1241	2013/2014 season (100%)	0	213	0	250	182
32	GER	Annabelle Prölss / Ruben Blommaert	1241	2012/2013 season (100%)	266	182	148	0	0
32	GER	Annabelle Prölss / Ruben Blommaert	1241	2011/2012 season (70%)	0	0	0	0	0
33	USA	Gretchen Donlan / Andrew Speroff	1143	2013/2014 season (100%)	0	0	0	250	250
33	USA	Gretchen Donlan / Andrew Speroff	1143	2012/2013 season (100%)	0	236	0	225	182
33	USA	Gretchen Donlan / Andrew Speroff	1143	2011/2012 season (70%)	0	0	0	0	0
34	RUS	Kamilla Gainetdinova / Ivan Bich	1133	2013/2014 season (100%)	0	250	207	0	0
34	RUS	Kamilla Gainetdinova / Ivan Bich	1133	2012/2013 season (100%)	239	182	133	0	0
34	RUS	Kamilla Gainetdinova / Ivan Bich	1133	2011/2012 season (70%)	122	0	0	0	0
35	CHN	Wenting Wang / Yan Zhang	1128	2013/2014 season (100%)	446	0	0	0	0
35	CHN	Wenting Wang / Yan Zhang	1128	2012/2013 season (100%)	446	236	0	0	0
35	CHN	Wenting Wang / Yan Zhang	1128	2011/2012 season (70%)	0	0	0	0	0
36	USA	Madeline Aaron / Max Settlage	1071	2013/2014 season (100%)	328	225	182	0	0
36	USA	Madeline Aaron / Max Settlage	1071	2012/2013 season (100%)	0	203	133	0	0
36	USA	Madeline Aaron / Max Settlage	1071	2011/2012 season (70%)	0	115	0	0	0
37	USA	Britney Simpson / Matthew Blackmer	1032	2013/2014 season (100%)	0	0	0	0	0
37	USA	Britney Simpson / Matthew Blackmer	1032	2012/2013 season (100%)	194	164	164	0	0
37	USA	Britney Simpson / Matthew Blackmer	1032	2011/2012 season (70%)	136	199	175	0	0
38	USA	Jessica Calalang / Zack Sidhu	977	2013/2014 season (100%)	0	0	0	225	0
38	USA	Jessica Calalang / Zack Sidhu	977	2012/2013 season (100%)	215	148	120	0	0
38	USA	Jessica Calalang / Zack Sidhu	977	2011/2012 season (70%)	0	142	127	0	0
39	RUS	Katarina Gerboldt / Alexander Enbert	927	2013/2014 season (100%)	0	0	0	225	203
39	RUS	Katarina Gerboldt / Alexander Enbert	927	2012/2013 season (100%)	0	0	0	0	0
39	RUS	Katarina Gerboldt / Alexander Enbert	927	2011/2012 season (70%)	0	183	0	158	158
40	UKR	Julia Lavrentieva / Yuri Rudyk	825	2013/2014 season (100%)	0	0	0	203	0
40	UKR	Julia Lavrentieva / Yuri Rudyk	825	2012/2013 season (100%)	293	0	0	164	0
40	UKR	Julia Lavrentieva / Yuri Rudyk	825	2011/2012 season (70%)	89	76	0	0	0
41	BLR	Maria Paliakova / Nikita Bochkov	813	2013/2014 season (100%)	214	0	0	203	182
41	BLR	Maria Paliakova / Nikita Bochkov	813	2012/2013 season (100%)	214	0	0	0	0
41	BLR	Maria Paliakova / Nikita Bochkov	813	2011/2012 season (70%)	0	0	0	0	0
42	CAN	Natasha Purich / Mervin Tran	787	2013/2014 season (100%)	551	236	0	0	0
42	CAN	Natasha Purich / Mervin Tran	787	2012/2013 season (100%)	0	0	0	0	0
42	CAN	Natasha Purich / Mervin Tran	787	2011/2012 season (70%)	0	0	0	0	0
43	ITA	Alessandra Cernuschi / Filippo Ambrosini	770	2013/2014 season (100%)	239	203	164	164	0
43	ITA	Alessandra Cernuschi / Filippo Ambrosini	770	2012/2013 season (100%)	0	0	0	0	0
43	ITA	Alessandra Cernuschi / Filippo Ambrosini	770	2011/2012 season (70%)	0	0	0	0	0
44	ISR	Andrea Davidovich / Evgeni Krasnopolski	696	2013/2014 season (100%)	446	0	0	250	0
44	ISR	Andrea Davidovich / Evgeni Krasnopolski	696	2012/2013 season (100%)	0	0	0	0	0
44	ISR	Andrea Davidovich / Evgeni Krasnopolski	696	2011/2012 season (70%)	0	0	0	0	0
45	POL	Magdalena Klatka / Radoslaw Chruscinski	641	2013/2014 season (100%)	0	0	0	164	0
45	POL	Magdalena Klatka / Radoslaw Chruscinski	641	2012/2013 season (100%)	192	0	0	0	0
45	POL	Magdalena Klatka / Radoslaw Chruscinski	641	2011/2012 season (70%)	99	93	93	0	0
46	CAN	Jessica Dube / Sebastien Wolfe	629	2013/2014 season (100%)	0	0	0	0	0
46	CAN	Jessica Dube / Sebastien Wolfe	629	2012/2013 season (100%)	0	0	0	0	0
46	CAN	Jessica Dube / Sebastien Wolfe	629	2011/2012 season (70%)	281	183	165	0	0
47	AUT	Miriam Ziegler / Severin Kiefer	628	2013/2014 season (100%)	264	0	0	182	182
47	AUT	Miriam Ziegler / Severin Kiefer	628	2012/2013 season (100%)	0	0	0	0	0
47	AUT	Miriam Ziegler / Severin Kiefer	628	2011/2012 season (70%)	0	0	0	0	0
48	CHN	Meiyi Li / Bo Jiang	623	2013/2014 season (100%)	0	0	0	0	0
48	CHN	Meiyi Li / Bo Jiang	623	2012/2013 season (100%)	157	120	0	0	0
48	CHN	Meiyi Li / Bo Jiang	623	2011/2012 season (70%)	151	127	68	0	0
49	USA	Lindsay Davis / Rockne Brubaker	613	2013/2014 season (100%)	0	236	213	164	0
49	USA	Lindsay Davis / Rockne Brubaker	613	2012/2013 season (100%)	0	0	0	0	0
49	USA	Lindsay Davis / Rockne Brubaker	613	2011/2012 season (70%)	0	0	0	0	0
50	GBR	Stacey Kemp / David King	578	2013/2014 season (100%)	237	0	0	0	0
50	GBR	Stacey Kemp / David King	578	2012/2013 season (100%)	325	0	0	0	0
50	GBR	Stacey Kemp / David King	578	2011/2012 season (70%)	253	0	0	0	0
50	CAN	Tara Hancherow / Wesley Killing	578	2013/2014 season (100%)	266	164	148	0	0
50	CAN	Tara Hancherow / Wesley Killing	578	2012/2013 season (100%)	0	0	0	0	0
50	CAN	Tara Hancherow / Wesley Killing	578	2011/2012 season (70%)	0	0	0	0	0
52	GBR	Amani Fancy / Christopher Boyadji	556	2013/2014 season (100%)	192	0	0	182	182
52	GBR	Amani Fancy / Christopher Boyadji	556	2012/2013 season (100%)	0	0	0	0	0
52	GBR	Amani Fancy / Christopher Boyadji	556	2011/2012 season (70%)	0	0	0	0	0
53	EST	Natalja Zabijako / Alexandr Zaboev	550	2013/2014 season (100%)	325	0	0	225	0
53	EST	Natalja Zabijako / Alexandr Zaboev	550	2012/2013 season (100%)	0	0	0	0	0
53	EST	Natalja Zabijako / Alexandr Zaboev	550	2011/2012 season (70%)	0	0	0	0	0
54	USA	Kaitlin Budd / Nikita Cheban	527	2013/2014 season (100%)	215	164	148	0	0
54	USA	Kaitlin Budd / Nikita Cheban	527	2012/2013 season (100%)	0	0	0	0	0
54	USA	Kaitlin Budd / Nikita Cheban	527	2011/2012 season (70%)	0	0	0	0	0
55	CZE	Anna Dušková / Martin Bidař	462	2013/2014 season (100%)	194	148	120	0	0
55	CZE	Anna Dušková / Martin Bidař	462	2012/2013 season (100%)	0	0	0	0	0
55	CZE	Anna Dušková / Martin Bidař	462	2011/2012 season (70%)	0	0	0	0	0
56	BUL	Elizaveta Makarova / Leri Kenchadze	428	2013/2014 season (100%)	0	0	0	0	0
56	BUL	Elizaveta Makarova / Leri Kenchadze	428	2012/2013 season (100%)	264	0	0	164	0
56	BUL	Elizaveta Makarova / Leri Kenchadze	428	2011/2012 season (70%)	0	0	0	0	0
56	CAN	Mary Orr / Phelan Simpson	428	2013/2014 season (100%)	295	133	0	0	0
56	CAN	Mary Orr / Phelan Simpson	428	2012/2013 season (100%)	0	0	0	0	0
56	CAN	Mary Orr / Phelan Simpson	428	2011/2012 season (70%)	0	0	0	0	0
58	RUS	Arina Cherniavskaia / Antonino Souza-Kordyeru	389	2013/2014 season (100%)	0	225	164	0	0
58	RUS	Arina Cherniavskaia / Antonino Souza-Kordyeru	389	2012/2013 season (100%)	0	0	0	0	0
58	RUS	Arina Cherniavskaia / Antonino Souza-Kordyeru	389	2011/2012 season (70%)	0	0	0	0	0
59	BLR	Lubov Bakirova / Mikalai Kamianchuk	386	2013/2014 season (100%)	0	0	0	0	0
59	BLR	Lubov Bakirova / Mikalai Kamianchuk	386	2012/2013 season (100%)	0	0	0	0	0
59	BLR	Lubov Bakirova / Mikalai Kamianchuk	386	2011/2012 season (70%)	228	0	0	158	0
60	JPN	Narumi Takahashi / Ryuichi Kihara	382	2013/2014 season (100%)	0	191	191	0	0
60	JPN	Narumi Takahashi / Ryuichi Kihara	382	2012/2013 season (100%)	0	0	0	0	0
60	JPN	Narumi Takahashi / Ryuichi Kihara	382	2011/2012 season (70%)	0	0	0	0	0
61	CAN	Julianne Séguin / Charlie Bilodeau	364	2013/2014 season (100%)	0	182	182	0	0
61	CAN	Julianne Séguin / Charlie Bilodeau	364	2012/2013 season (100%)	0	0	0	0	0
61	CAN	Julianne Séguin / Charlie Bilodeau	364	2011/2012 season (70%)	0	0	0	0	0
62	USA	Chelsea Liu / Devin Perini	346	2013/2014 season (100%)	0	182	164	0	0
62	USA	Chelsea Liu / Devin Perini	346	2012/2013 season (100%)	0	0	0	0	0
62	USA	Chelsea Liu / Devin Perini	346	2011/2012 season (70%)	0	0	0	0	0
63	HKG	Marin Ono / Hon Lam To	332	2013/2014 season (100%)	127	108	97	0	0
63	HKG	Marin Ono / Hon Lam To	332	2012/2013 season (100%)	0	0	0	0	0
63	HKG	Marin Ono / Hon Lam To	332	2011/2012 season (70%)	0	0	0	0	0
64	LAT	Ekaterina Pribylova / Jegors Nikita Admiralovs	330	2013/2014 season (100%)	114	108	108	0	0
64	LAT	Ekaterina Pribylova / Jegors Nikita Admiralovs	330	2012/2013 season (100%)	0	0	0	0	0
64	LAT	Ekaterina Pribylova / Jegors Nikita Admiralovs	330	2011/2012 season (70%)	0	0	0	0	0
65	USA	Jessica Pfund / Aj Reiss	297	2013/2014 season (100%)	0	0	0	0	0
65	USA	Jessica Pfund / Aj Reiss	297	2012/2013 season (100%)	0	164	133	0	0
65	USA	Jessica Pfund / Aj Reiss	297	2011/2012 season (70%)	0	0	0	0	0
66	CHN	Xuehan Wang / Lei Wang	292	2013/2014 season (100%)	0	292	0	0	0
66	CHN	Xuehan Wang / Lei Wang	292	2012/2013 season (100%)	0	0	0	0	0
66	CHN	Xuehan Wang / Lei Wang	292	2011/2012 season (70%)	0	0	0	0	0
67	USA	Christina Zaitsev / Ernie Utah Stevens	268	2013/2014 season (100%)	0	148	120	0	0
67	USA	Christina Zaitsev / Ernie Utah Stevens	268	2012/2013 season (100%)	0	0	0	0	0
67	USA	Christina Zaitsev / Ernie Utah Stevens	268	2011/2012 season (70%)	0	0	0	0	0
68	ITA	Bianca Manacorda / Niccolo Macii	266	2013/2014 season (100%)	0	133	133	0	0
68	ITA	Bianca Manacorda / Niccolo Macii	266	2012/2013 season (100%)	0	0	0	0	0
68	ITA	Bianca Manacorda / Niccolo Macii	266	2011/2012 season (70%)	0	0	0	0	0
69	GER	Julia Linckh / Konrad Hocker-Scholler	261	2013/2014 season (100%)	141	120	0	0	0
69	GER	Julia Linckh / Konrad Hocker-Scholler	261	2012/2013 season (100%)	0	0	0	0	0
69	GER	Julia Linckh / Konrad Hocker-Scholler	261	2011/2012 season (70%)	0	0	0	0	0
70	GBR	Molly Lanaghan / Jake Astill	217	2013/2014 season (100%)	0	120	97	0	0
70	GBR	Molly Lanaghan / Jake Astill	217	2012/2013 season (100%)	0	0	0	0	0
70	GBR	Molly Lanaghan / Jake Astill	217	2011/2012 season (70%)	0	0	0	0	0
71	RUS	Valeria Grechukhina / Andrei Filonov	208	2013/2014 season (100%)	0	0	0	0	0
71	RUS	Valeria Grechukhina / Andrei Filonov	208	2012/2013 season (100%)	0	0	0	0	0
71	RUS	Valeria Grechukhina / Andrei Filonov	208	2011/2012 season (70%)	0	104	104	0	0
72	GER	Vanessa Bauer / Nolan Seegert	205	2013/2014 season (100%)	0	0	0	0	0
72	GER	Vanessa Bauer / Nolan Seegert	205	2012/2013 season (100%)	0	108	97	0	0
72	GER	Vanessa Bauer / Nolan Seegert	205	2011/2012 season (70%)	0	0	0	0	0
73	ITA	Giulia Foresti / Luca Dematte	203	2013/2014 season (100%)	0	0	0	203	0
73	ITA	Giulia Foresti / Luca Dematte	203	2012/2013 season (100%)	0	0	0	0	0
73	ITA	Giulia Foresti / Luca Dematte	203	2011/2012 season (70%)	0	0	0	0	0
74	CHN	Mingyang Zhang / Zhong Xie	182	2013/2014 season (100%)	0	182	0	0	0
74	CHN	Mingyang Zhang / Zhong Xie	182	2012/2013 season (100%)	0	0	0	0	0
74	CHN	Mingyang Zhang / Zhong Xie	182	2011/2012 season (70%)	0	0	0	0	0
75	USA	Aya Takai / Brian Johnson	174	2013/2014 season (100%)	174	0	0	0	0
75	USA	Aya Takai / Brian Johnson	174	2012/2013 season (100%)	0	0	0	0	0
75	USA	Aya Takai / Brian Johnson	174	2011/2012 season (70%)	0	0	0	0	0
76	GBR	Caitlin Yankowskas / Hamish Gaman	164	2013/2014 season (100%)	0	0	0	164	0
76	GBR	Caitlin Yankowskas / Hamish Gaman	164	2012/2013 season (100%)	0	0	0	0	0
76	GBR	Caitlin Yankowskas / Hamish Gaman	164	2011/2012 season (70%)	0	0	0	0	0
76	USA	Dee Dee Leng / Timothy Leduc	164	2013/2014 season (100%)	0	0	0	0	0
76	USA	Dee Dee Leng / Timothy Leduc	164	2012/2013 season (100%)	0	0	0	164	0
76	USA	Dee Dee Leng / Timothy Leduc	164	2011/2012 season (70%)	0	0	0	0	0
76	ESP	Veronica Grigorieva / Aritz Maestu	164	2013/2014 season (100%)	0	0	0	164	0
76	ESP	Veronica Grigorieva / Aritz Maestu	164	2012/2013 season (100%)	0	0	0	0	0
76	ESP	Veronica Grigorieva / Aritz Maestu	164	2011/2012 season (70%)	0	0	0	0	0
76	TUR	Olga Beständigová / İlhan Mansız	164	2013/2014 season (100%)	0	0	0	164	0
76	TUR	Olga Beständigová / İlhan Mansız	164	2012/2013 season (100%)	0	0	0	0	0
76	TUR	Olga Beständigová / İlhan Mansız	164	2011/2012 season (70%)	0	0	0	0	0
80	JPN	Sumire Suto / Konstantin Chizhikov	157	2013/2014 season (100%)	157	0	0	0	0
80	JPN	Sumire Suto / Konstantin Chizhikov	157	2012/2013 season (100%)	0	0	0	0	0
80	JPN	Sumire Suto / Konstantin Chizhikov	157	2011/2012 season (70%)	0	0	0	0	0
81	CAN	Taylor Steele / Robert Schultz	149	2013/2014 season (100%)	0	0	0	0	0
81	CAN	Taylor Steele / Robert Schultz	149	2012/2013 season (100%)	0	0	0	0	0
81	CAN	Taylor Steele / Robert Schultz	149	2011/2012 season (70%)	0	149	0	0	0
82	CAN	Dylan Conway / Dustin Sherriff-Clayton	148	2013/2014 season (100%)	0	148	0	0	0
82	CAN	Dylan Conway / Dustin Sherriff-Clayton	148	2012/2013 season (100%)	0	0	0	0	0
82	CAN	Dylan Conway / Dustin Sherriff-Clayton	148	2011/2012 season (70%)	0	0	0	0	0
83	ROU	Tatiana Novik / Andrei Novoselov	127	2013/2014 season (100%)	0	0	0	0	0
83	ROU	Tatiana Novik / Andrei Novoselov	127	2012/2013 season (100%)	0	0	0	0	0
83	ROU	Tatiana Novik / Andrei Novoselov	127	2011/2012 season (70%)	0	0	0	127	0
83	SWE	Ronja Roll / Gustav Forsgren	127	2013/2014 season (100%)	0	0	0	0	0
83	SWE	Ronja Roll / Gustav Forsgren	127	2012/2013 season (100%)	0	0	0	0	0
83	SWE	Ronja Roll / Gustav Forsgren	127	2011/2012 season (70%)	0	0	0	127	0
85	NED	Rachel Epstein / Dmitry Epstein	103	2013/2014 season (100%)	0	0	0	0	0
85	NED	Rachel Epstein / Dmitry Epstein	103	2012/2013 season (100%)	103	0	0	0	0
85	NED	Rachel Epstein / Dmitry Epstein	103	2011/2012 season (70%)	0	0	0	0	0
86	GBR	Robynne Tweedale / Steven Adcock	97	2013/2014 season (100%)	0	97	0	0	0
86	GBR	Robynne Tweedale / Steven Adcock	97	2012/2013 season (100%)	0	0	0	0	0
86	GBR	Robynne Tweedale / Steven Adcock	97	2011/2012 season (70%)	0	0	0	0	0
86	PRK	Kyong Mi Kang / Ju Sik Kim	97	2013/2014 season (100%)	0	0	0	0	0
86	PRK	Kyong Mi Kang / Ju Sik Kim	97	2012/2013 season (100%)	0	97	0	0	0
86	PRK	Kyong Mi Kang / Ju Sik Kim	97	2011/2012 season (70%)	0	0	0	0	0
88	USA	Olivia Oltmanns / Joshua Santillan	93	2013/2014 season (100%)	0	0	0	0	0
88	USA	Olivia Oltmanns / Joshua Santillan	93	2012/2013 season (100%)	0	0	0	0	0
88	USA	Olivia Oltmanns / Joshua Santillan	93	2011/2012 season (70%)	0	93	0	0	0

==== Ice dance (136 couples) ====
As of 29 March 2014

Rank	Nation	Couple	Points	Season	ISU Championships or Olympics	(Junior) Grand Prix and Final		Selected International Competition	
Rank	Nation	Couple	Points	Season	Best	Best	2nd Best	Best	2nd Best
1	USA	Meryl Davis / Charlie White	5210	2013/2014 season (100%)	1200	800	400	250	0
1	USA	Meryl Davis / Charlie White	5210	2012/2013 season (100%)	1200	800	400	0	0
1	USA	Meryl Davis / Charlie White	5210	2011/2012 season (70%)	756	560	280	0	0
2	CAN	Tessa Virtue / Scott Moir	4929	2013/2014 season (100%)	1080	720	400	250	0
2	CAN	Tessa Virtue / Scott Moir	4929	2012/2013 season (100%)	1080	720	400	0	0
2	CAN	Tessa Virtue / Scott Moir	4929	2011/2012 season (70%)	840	504	280	175	0
3	RUS	Ekaterina Bobrova / Dmitri Soloviev	4127	2013/2014 season (100%)	787	583	400	250	0
3	RUS	Ekaterina Bobrova / Dmitri Soloviev	4127	2012/2013 season (100%)	972	525	360	250	0
3	RUS	Ekaterina Bobrova / Dmitri Soloviev	4127	2011/2012 season (70%)	529	330	280	0	0
4	ITA	Anna Cappellini / Luca Lanotte	4075	2013/2014 season (100%)	1200	472	360	0	0
4	ITA	Anna Cappellini / Luca Lanotte	4075	2012/2013 season (100%)	875	583	360	225	0
4	ITA	Anna Cappellini / Luca Lanotte	4075	2011/2012 season (70%)	496	227	227	0	0
5	CAN	Kaitlyn Weaver / Andrew Poje	3959	2013/2014 season (100%)	1080	525	360	225	0
5	CAN	Kaitlyn Weaver / Andrew Poje	3959	2012/2013 season (100%)	787	324	324	250	0
5	CAN	Kaitlyn Weaver / Andrew Poje	3959	2011/2012 season (70%)	613	408	252	0	0
6	FRA	Nathalie Péchalat / Fabian Bourzat	3831	2013/2014 season (100%)	972	648	400	0	0
6	FRA	Nathalie Péchalat / Fabian Bourzat	3831	2012/2013 season (100%)	709	648	400	0	0
6	FRA	Nathalie Péchalat / Fabian Bourzat	3831	2011/2012 season (70%)	680	454	252	0	0
7	RUS	Elena Ilinykh / Nikita Katsalapov	3462	2013/2014 season (100%)	972	360	292	0	0
7	RUS	Elena Ilinykh / Nikita Katsalapov	3462	2012/2013 season (100%)	756	472	360	250	0
7	RUS	Elena Ilinykh / Nikita Katsalapov	3462	2011/2012 season (70%)	551	227	204	0	0
8	USA	Madison Chock / Evan Bates	3410	2013/2014 season (100%)	787	324	324	225	0
8	USA	Madison Chock / Evan Bates	3410	2012/2013 season (100%)	680	292	0	250	182
8	USA	Madison Chock / Evan Bates	3410	2011/2012 season (70%)	0	204	183	142	0
9	USA	Madison Hubbell / Zachary Donohue	3024	2013/2014 season (100%)	840	324	292	250	0
9	USA	Madison Hubbell / Zachary Donohue	3024	2012/2013 season (100%)	0	292	262	203	0
9	USA	Madison Hubbell / Zachary Donohue	3024	2011/2012 season (70%)	386	165	0	175	0
10	GBR	Penny Coomes / Nicholas Buckland	2936	2013/2014 season (100%)	680	213	0	250	164
10	GBR	Penny Coomes / Nicholas Buckland	2936	2012/2013 season (100%)	551	236	213	250	0
10	GBR	Penny Coomes / Nicholas Buckland	2936	2011/2012 season (70%)	347	204	0	175	158
11	GER	Nelli Zhiganshina / Alexander Gazsi	2847	2013/2014 season (100%)	446	292	236	225	164
11	GER	Nelli Zhiganshina / Alexander Gazsi	2847	2012/2013 season (100%)	496	262	262	250	203
11	GER	Nelli Zhiganshina / Alexander Gazsi	2847	2011/2012 season (70%)	293	204	204	175	175
12	USA	Maia Shibutani / Alex Shibutani	2819	2013/2014 season (100%)	709	324	324	0	0
12	USA	Maia Shibutani / Alex Shibutani	2819	2012/2013 season (100%)	612	324	292	0	0
12	USA	Maia Shibutani / Alex Shibutani	2819	2011/2012 season (70%)	428	368	280	158	0
13	RUS	Ekaterina Riazanova / Ilia Tkachenko	2645	2013/2014 season (100%)	551	292	292	0	0
13	RUS	Ekaterina Riazanova / Ilia Tkachenko	2645	2012/2013 season (100%)	612	324	324	250	0
13	RUS	Ekaterina Riazanova / Ilia Tkachenko	2645	2011/2012 season (70%)	386	204	183	0	0
14	CAN	Piper Gilles / Paul Poirier	2583	2013/2014 season (100%)	756	262	236	0	0
14	CAN	Piper Gilles / Paul Poirier	2583	2012/2013 season (100%)	551	292	236	250	0
14	CAN	Piper Gilles / Paul Poirier	2583	2011/2012 season (70%)	0	0	0	0	0
15	AZE	Julia Zlobina / Alexei Sitnikov	2581	2013/2014 season (100%)	496	191	0	250	250
15	AZE	Julia Zlobina / Alexei Sitnikov	2581	2012/2013 season (100%)	446	262	236	225	225
15	AZE	Julia Zlobina / Alexei Sitnikov	2581	2011/2012 season (70%)	228	0	0	175	142
16	RUS	Victoria Sinitsina / Ruslan Zhiganshin	2459	2013/2014 season (100%)	638	191	0	225	0
16	RUS	Victoria Sinitsina / Ruslan Zhiganshin	2459	2012/2013 season (100%)	0	324	236	250	0
16	RUS	Victoria Sinitsina / Ruslan Zhiganshin	2459	2011/2012 season (70%)	350	245	175	0	0
17	FRA	Pernelle Carron / Lloyd Jones	2290	2013/2014 season (100%)	275	292	236	225	0
17	FRA	Pernelle Carron / Lloyd Jones	2290	2012/2013 season (100%)	377	213	191	250	0
17	FRA	Pernelle Carron / Lloyd Jones	2290	2011/2012 season (70%)	312	227	165	158	0
18	FRA	Gabriella Papadakis / Guillaume Cizeron	2261	2013/2014 season (100%)	339	262	213	250	182
18	FRA	Gabriella Papadakis / Guillaume Cizeron	2261	2012/2013 season (100%)	450	315	250	0	0
18	FRA	Gabriella Papadakis / Guillaume Cizeron	2261	2011/2012 season (70%)	230	127	127	0	0
19	ITA	Charlene Guignard / Marco Fabbri	2167	2013/2014 season (100%)	402	213	0	250	225
19	ITA	Charlene Guignard / Marco Fabbri	2167	2012/2013 season (100%)	362	262	0	250	203
19	ITA	Charlene Guignard / Marco Fabbri	2167	2011/2012 season (70%)	205	0	0	175	158
20	JPN	Cathy Reed / Chris Reed	2132	2013/2014 season (100%)	200	262	236	0	0
20	JPN	Cathy Reed / Chris Reed	2132	2012/2013 season (100%)	446	262	0	225	225
20	JPN	Cathy Reed / Chris Reed	2132	2011/2012 season (70%)	0	149	0	127	0
21	CAN	Nicole Orford / Thomas Williams	2099	2013/2014 season (100%)	551	191	0	203	0
21	CAN	Nicole Orford / Thomas Williams	2099	2012/2013 season (100%)	496	292	191	0	0
21	CAN	Nicole Orford / Thomas Williams	2099	2011/2012 season (70%)	207	175	104	0	0
22	USA	Alexandra Aldridge / Daniel Eaton	2059	2013/2014 season (100%)	680	262	0	0	0
22	USA	Alexandra Aldridge / Daniel Eaton	2059	2012/2013 season (100%)	405	284	250	0	0
22	USA	Alexandra Aldridge / Daniel Eaton	2059	2011/2012 season (70%)	284	178	158	0	0
23	LTU	Isabella Tobias / Deividas Stagniūnas	1964	2013/2014 season (100%)	362	213	0	182	0
23	LTU	Isabella Tobias / Deividas Stagniūnas	1964	2012/2013 season (100%)	275	0	0	225	182
23	LTU	Isabella Tobias / Deividas Stagniūnas	1964	2011/2012 season (70%)	253	227	183	115	0
24	RUS	Alexandra Stepanova / Ivan Bukin	1805	2013/2014 season (100%)	0	191	0	0	0
24	RUS	Alexandra Stepanova / Ivan Bukin	1805	2012/2013 season (100%)	500	350	250	0	0
24	RUS	Alexandra Stepanova / Ivan Bukin	1805	2011/2012 season (70%)	315	199	175	0	0
25	CAN	Alexandra Paul / Mitchell Islam	1800	2013/2014 season (100%)	465	262	0	203	0
25	CAN	Alexandra Paul / Mitchell Islam	1800	2012/2013 season (100%)	0	0	0	225	164
25	CAN	Alexandra Paul / Mitchell Islam	1800	2011/2012 season (70%)	347	134	0	0	0
26	RUS	Anna Yanovskaya / Sergey Mozgov	1786	2013/2014 season (100%)	450	350	250	0	0
26	RUS	Anna Yanovskaya / Sergey Mozgov	1786	2012/2013 season (100%)	0	255	225	0	0
26	RUS	Anna Yanovskaya / Sergey Mozgov	1786	2011/2012 season (70%)	256	221	175	0	0
27	USA	Lynn Kriengkrairut / Logan Giulietti-Schmitt	1763	2013/2014 season (100%)	496	0	0	182	0
27	USA	Lynn Kriengkrairut / Logan Giulietti-Schmitt	1763	2012/2013 season (100%)	0	292	0	250	203
27	USA	Lynn Kriengkrairut / Logan Giulietti-Schmitt	1763	2011/2012 season (70%)	0	165	0	175	0
28	CAN	Kharis Ralph / Asher Hill	1750	2013/2014 season (100%)	612	0	0	203	182
28	CAN	Kharis Ralph / Asher Hill	1750	2012/2013 season (100%)	0	191	0	0	0
28	CAN	Kharis Ralph / Asher Hill	1750	2011/2012 season (70%)	237	183	0	142	0
29	USA	Kaitlin Hawayek / Jean-Luc Baker	1720	2013/2014 season (100%)	500	315	250	0	0
29	USA	Kaitlin Hawayek / Jean-Luc Baker	1720	2012/2013 season (100%)	266	225	164	0	0
29	USA	Kaitlin Hawayek / Jean-Luc Baker	1720	2011/2012 season (70%)	0	0	0	0	0
30	GER	Tanja Kolbe / Stefano Caruso	1699	2013/2014 season (100%)	293	213	0	203	203
30	GER	Tanja Kolbe / Stefano Caruso	1699	2012/2013 season (100%)	402	0	0	203	182
30	GER	Tanja Kolbe / Stefano Caruso	1699	2011/2012 season (70%)	185	0	0	175	142
31	RUS	Ksenia Monko / Kirill Khaliavin	1594	2013/2014 season (100%)	0	262	236	225	203
31	RUS	Ksenia Monko / Kirill Khaliavin	1594	2012/2013 season (100%)	0	236	0	250	182
31	RUS	Ksenia Monko / Kirill Khaliavin	1594	2011/2012 season (70%)	0	0	0	0	0
32	EST	Irina Shtork / Taavi Rand	1575	2013/2014 season (100%)	214	0	0	225	164
32	EST	Irina Shtork / Taavi Rand	1575	2012/2013 season (100%)	293	0	0	225	203
32	EST	Irina Shtork / Taavi Rand	1575	2011/2012 season (70%)	150	158	93	0	0
33	ITA	Lorenza Alessandrini / Simone Vaturi	1574	2013/2014 season (100%)	126	0	0	225	203
33	ITA	Lorenza Alessandrini / Simone Vaturi	1574	2012/2013 season (100%)	0	236	0	225	203
33	ITA	Lorenza Alessandrini / Simone Vaturi	1574	2011/2012 season (70%)	173	183	0	158	115
34	UKR	Siobhan Heekin-Canedy / Dmitri Dun	1531	2013/2014 season (100%)	0	191	0	203	164
34	UKR	Siobhan Heekin-Canedy / Dmitri Dun	1531	2012/2013 season (100%)	305	0	0	250	225
34	UKR	Siobhan Heekin-Canedy / Dmitri Dun	1531	2011/2012 season (70%)	193	0	0	158	142
35	CHN	Xiaoyang Yu / Chen Wang	1457	2013/2014 season (100%)	0	236	0	0	0
35	CHN	Xiaoyang Yu / Chen Wang	1457	2012/2013 season (100%)	362	191	191	0	0
35	CHN	Xiaoyang Yu / Chen Wang	1457	2011/2012 season (70%)	312	165	0	0	0
36	USA	Lorraine McNamara / Quinn Carpenter	1444	2013/2014 season (100%)	365	284	250	0	0
36	USA	Lorraine McNamara / Quinn Carpenter	1444	2012/2013 season (100%)	215	182	148	0	0
36	USA	Lorraine McNamara / Quinn Carpenter	1444	2011/2012 season (70%)	0	0	0	0	0
37	ESP	Sara Hurtado / Adria Diaz	1421	2013/2014 season (100%)	339	0	0	225	164
37	ESP	Sara Hurtado / Adria Diaz	1421	2012/2013 season (100%)	192	0	0	225	0
37	ESP	Sara Hurtado / Adria Diaz	1421	2011/2012 season (70%)	126	134	0	142	0
38	CAN	Madeline Edwards / Zhao Kai Pang	1396	2013/2014 season (100%)	405	225	203	0	0
38	CAN	Madeline Edwards / Zhao Kai Pang	1396	2012/2013 season (100%)	157	203	203	0	0
38	CAN	Madeline Edwards / Zhao Kai Pang	1396	2011/2012 season (70%)	0	115	0	0	0
39	RUS	Ekaterina Pushkash / Jonathan Guerreiro	1369	2013/2014 season (100%)	0	0	0	250	203
39	RUS	Ekaterina Pushkash / Jonathan Guerreiro	1369	2012/2013 season (100%)	0	213	0	225	164
39	RUS	Ekaterina Pushkash / Jonathan Guerreiro	1369	2011/2012 season (70%)	0	165	149	158	0
40	RUS	Valeria Zenkova / Valerie Sinitsin	1309	2013/2014 season (100%)	0	0	0	164	0
40	RUS	Valeria Zenkova / Valerie Sinitsin	1309	2012/2013 season (100%)	365	250	230	0	0
40	RUS	Valeria Zenkova / Valerie Sinitsin	1309	2011/2012 season (70%)	0	158	142	0	0
41	RUS	Evgenia Kosigina / Nikolai Moroshkin	1300	2013/2014 season (100%)	215	182	0	0	0
41	RUS	Evgenia Kosigina / Nikolai Moroshkin	1300	2012/2013 season (100%)	295	225	225	0	0
41	RUS	Evgenia Kosigina / Nikolai Moroshkin	1300	2011/2012 season (70%)	0	158	142	0	0
42	UKR	Alexandra Nazarova / Maxim Nikitin	1285	2013/2014 season (100%)	328	230	225	0	0
42	UKR	Alexandra Nazarova / Maxim Nikitin	1285	2012/2013 season (100%)	174	164	164	0	0
42	UKR	Alexandra Nazarova / Maxim Nikitin	1285	2011/2012 season (70%)	0	0	0	0	0
43	GER	Shari Koch / Christian Nüchtern	1276	2013/2014 season (100%)	0	0	0	225	0
43	GER	Shari Koch / Christian Nüchtern	1276	2012/2013 season (100%)	239	225	182	0	0
43	GER	Shari Koch / Christian Nüchtern	1276	2011/2012 season (70%)	151	127	127	0	0
44	CAN	Mackenzie Bent / Garrett MacKeen	1262	2013/2014 season (100%)	157	250	133	0	0
44	CAN	Mackenzie Bent / Garrett MacKeen	1262	2012/2013 season (100%)	328	203	182	0	0
44	CAN	Mackenzie Bent / Garrett MacKeen	1262	2011/2012 season (70%)	0	142	115	0	0
45	AUS	Danielle O'Brien / Gregory Merriman	1233	2013/2014 season (100%)	446	0	0	0	0
45	AUS	Danielle O'Brien / Gregory Merriman	1233	2012/2013 season (100%)	402	0	0	203	182
45	AUS	Danielle O'Brien / Gregory Merriman	1233	2011/2012 season (70%)	253	0	0	0	0
46	CHN	Xintong Huang / Xun Zheng	1220	2013/2014 season (100%)	0	0	0	182	0
46	CHN	Xintong Huang / Xun Zheng	1220	2012/2013 season (100%)	0	213	213	0	0
46	CHN	Xintong Huang / Xun Zheng	1220	2011/2012 season (70%)	264	183	165	0	0
47	TUR	Alisa Agafonova / Alper Uçar	1173	2013/2014 season (100%)	162	0	0	225	203
47	TUR	Alisa Agafonova / Alper Uçar	1173	2012/2013 season (100%)	237	0	0	182	164
47	TUR	Alisa Agafonova / Alper Uçar	1173	2011/2012 season (70%)	0	0	0	127	0
48	SVK	Federica Testa / Lukáš Csölley	1130	2013/2014 season (100%)	264	0	0	182	182
48	SVK	Federica Testa / Lukáš Csölley	1130	2012/2013 season (100%)	156	0	0	182	164
48	SVK	Federica Testa / Lukáš Csölley	1130	2011/2012 season (70%)	0	0	0	0	0
49	USA	Rachel Parsons / Michael Parsons	1120	2013/2014 season (100%)	239	225	225	0	0
49	USA	Rachel Parsons / Michael Parsons	1120	2012/2013 season (100%)	0	203	148	0	0
49	USA	Rachel Parsons / Michael Parsons	1120	2011/2012 season (70%)	80	76	0	0	0
50	CZE	Lucie Myslivecková / Neil Brown	999	2013/2014 season (100%)	0	0	0	0	0
50	CZE	Lucie Myslivecková / Neil Brown	999	2012/2013 season (100%)	214	0	0	225	203
50	CZE	Lucie Myslivecková / Neil Brown	999	2011/2012 season (70%)	88	0	0	142	127
51	HUN	Zsuzsanna Nagy / Mate Fejes	951	2013/2014 season (100%)	0	0	0	0	0
51	HUN	Zsuzsanna Nagy / Mate Fejes	951	2012/2013 season (100%)	173	0	0	203	164
51	HUN	Zsuzsanna Nagy / Mate Fejes	951	2011/2012 season (70%)	109	0	0	175	127
52	KOR	Rebeka Kim / Kirill Minov	806	2013/2014 season (100%)	295	182	164	0	0
52	KOR	Rebeka Kim / Kirill Minov	806	2012/2013 season (100%)	68	97	0	0	0
52	KOR	Rebeka Kim / Kirill Minov	806	2011/2012 season (70%)	0	0	0	0	0
53	RUS	Daria Morozova / Mikhail Zhirnov	791	2013/2014 season (100%)	0	203	203	0	0
53	RUS	Daria Morozova / Mikhail Zhirnov	791	2012/2013 season (100%)	0	203	182	0	0
53	RUS	Daria Morozova / Mikhail Zhirnov	791	2011/2012 season (70%)	0	115	0	0	0
54	POL	Justyna Plutowska / Peter Gerber	790	2013/2014 season (100%)	173	0	0	250	203
54	POL	Justyna Plutowska / Peter Gerber	790	2012/2013 season (100%)	0	0	0	164	0
54	POL	Justyna Plutowska / Peter Gerber	790	2011/2012 season (70%)	0	0	0	0	0
55	FRA	Estelle Elizabeth / Romain Le Gac	779	2013/2014 season (100%)	174	164	133	0	0
55	FRA	Estelle Elizabeth / Romain Le Gac	779	2012/2013 season (100%)	114	97	97	0	0
55	FRA	Estelle Elizabeth / Romain Le Gac	779	2011/2012 season (70%)	0	84	76	0	0
56	CHN	Yiyi Zhang / Nan Wu	772	2013/2014 season (100%)	402	213	0	0	0
56	CHN	Yiyi Zhang / Nan Wu	772	2012/2013 season (100%)	83	0	0	0	0
56	CHN	Yiyi Zhang / Nan Wu	772	2011/2012 season (70%)	89	68	0	0	0
57	RUS	Betina Popova / Yuri Vlasenko	771	2013/2014 season (100%)	266	255	250	0	0
57	RUS	Betina Popova / Yuri Vlasenko	771	2012/2013 season (100%)	0	0	0	0	0
57	RUS	Betina Popova / Yuri Vlasenko	771	2011/2012 season (70%)	0	0	0	0	0
58	RUS	Valeria Starygina / Ivan Volobuiev	761	2013/2014 season (100%)	0	0	0	0	0
58	RUS	Valeria Starygina / Ivan Volobuiev	761	2012/2013 season (100%)	0	0	0	225	203
58	RUS	Valeria Starygina / Ivan Volobuiev	761	2011/2012 season (70%)	0	0	0	175	158
59	RUS	Sofia Evdokimova / Egor Bazin	682	2013/2014 season (100%)	0	203	182	0	0
59	RUS	Sofia Evdokimova / Egor Bazin	682	2012/2013 season (100%)	0	164	133	0	0
59	RUS	Sofia Evdokimova / Egor Bazin	682	2011/2012 season (70%)	0	93	0	0	0
60	BLR	Viktoria Kavaliova / Yurii Bieliaiev	671	2013/2014 season (100%)	114	164	148	0	0
60	BLR	Viktoria Kavaliova / Yurii Bieliaiev	671	2012/2013 season (100%)	0	108	0	0	0
60	BLR	Viktoria Kavaliova / Yurii Bieliaiev	671	2011/2012 season (70%)	53	84	0	0	0
61	UKR	Daria Korotitskaia / Maksim Spodirev	614	2013/2014 season (100%)	0	148	120	0	0
61	UKR	Daria Korotitskaia / Maksim Spodirev	614	2012/2013 season (100%)	0	182	164	0	0
61	UKR	Daria Korotitskaia / Maksim Spodirev	614	2011/2012 season (70%)	0	0	0	0	0
62	SUI	Ramona Elsener / Florian Roost	585	2013/2014 season (100%)	0	0	0	0	0
62	SUI	Ramona Elsener / Florian Roost	585	2012/2013 season (100%)	140	0	0	203	0
62	SUI	Ramona Elsener / Florian Roost	585	2011/2012 season (70%)	0	0	0	127	115
63	USA	Anastasia Cannuscio / Colin McManus	578	2013/2014 season (100%)	0	0	0	250	0
63	USA	Anastasia Cannuscio / Colin McManus	578	2012/2013 season (100%)	0	213	0	0	0
63	USA	Anastasia Cannuscio / Colin McManus	578	2011/2012 season (70%)	0	0	0	115	0
64	DEN	Laurence Fournier Beaudry / Nikolaj Sørensen	568	2013/2014 season (100%)	140	0	0	225	203
64	DEN	Laurence Fournier Beaudry / Nikolaj Sørensen	568	2012/2013 season (100%)	0	0	0	0	0
64	DEN	Laurence Fournier Beaudry / Nikolaj Sørensen	568	2011/2012 season (70%)	0	0	0	0	0
65	CAN	Andreanne Poulin / Marc-Andre Servant	558	2013/2014 season (100%)	0	0	0	0	0
65	CAN	Andreanne Poulin / Marc-Andre Servant	558	2012/2013 season (100%)	0	203	203	0	0
65	CAN	Andreanne Poulin / Marc-Andre Servant	558	2011/2012 season (70%)	48	104	0	0	0
66	JPN	Emi Hirai / Marien De La Asuncion	557	2013/2014 season (100%)	264	0	0	0	0
66	JPN	Emi Hirai / Marien De La Asuncion	557	2012/2013 season (100%)	293	0	0	0	0
66	JPN	Emi Hirai / Marien De La Asuncion	557	2011/2012 season (70%)	0	0	0	0	0
67	GBR	Olivia Smart / Joseph Buckland	525	2013/2014 season (100%)	194	133	133	0	0
67	GBR	Olivia Smart / Joseph Buckland	525	2012/2013 season (100%)	0	0	0	0	0
67	GBR	Olivia Smart / Joseph Buckland	525	2011/2012 season (70%)	65	0	0	0	0
68	USA	Holly Moore / Daniel Klaber	505	2013/2014 season (100%)	0	203	182	0	0
68	USA	Holly Moore / Daniel Klaber	505	2012/2013 season (100%)	0	120	0	0	0
68	USA	Holly Moore / Daniel Klaber	505	2011/2012 season (70%)	0	0	0	0	0
69	GER	Ria Schiffner / Julian Salatzki	503	2013/2014 season (100%)	103	120	108	0	0
69	GER	Ria Schiffner / Julian Salatzki	503	2012/2013 season (100%)	75	97	0	0	0
69	GER	Ria Schiffner / Julian Salatzki	503	2011/2012 season (70%)	0	0	0	0	0
70	TUR	Cagla Demirsal / Berk Akalin	492	2013/2014 season (100%)	93	0	0	0	0
70	TUR	Cagla Demirsal / Berk Akalin	492	2012/2013 season (100%)	127	164	108	0	0
70	TUR	Cagla Demirsal / Berk Akalin	492	2011/2012 season (70%)	58	0	0	0	0
71	FIN	Henna Lindholm / Ossi Kanervo	480	2013/2014 season (100%)	113	0	0	203	164
71	FIN	Henna Lindholm / Ossi Kanervo	480	2012/2013 season (100%)	0	0	0	0	0
71	FIN	Henna Lindholm / Ossi Kanervo	480	2011/2012 season (70%)	0	0	0	0	0
72	USA	Elliana Pogrebinsky / Ross Gudis	478	2013/2014 season (100%)	0	182	148	0	0
72	USA	Elliana Pogrebinsky / Ross Gudis	478	2012/2013 season (100%)	0	148	0	0	0
72	USA	Elliana Pogrebinsky / Ross Gudis	478	2011/2012 season (70%)	0	0	0	0	0
73	FIN	Olesia Karmi / Max Lindholm	454	2013/2014 season (100%)	0	0	0	164	164
73	FIN	Olesia Karmi / Max Lindholm	454	2012/2013 season (100%)	126	0	0	0	0
73	FIN	Olesia Karmi / Max Lindholm	454	2011/2012 season (70%)	0	0	0	0	0
74	MEX	Pilar Maekawa Moreno / Leonardo Maekawa Moreno	451	2013/2014 season (100%)	214	0	0	0	0
74	MEX	Pilar Maekawa Moreno / Leonardo Maekawa Moreno	451	2012/2013 season (100%)	237	0	0	0	0
74	MEX	Pilar Maekawa Moreno / Leonardo Maekawa Moreno	451	2011/2012 season (70%)	0	0	0	0	0
75	RUS	Kristina Gorshkova / Vitali Butikov	446	2013/2014 season (100%)	0	0	0	0	0
75	RUS	Kristina Gorshkova / Vitali Butikov	446	2012/2013 season (100%)	0	0	0	182	0
75	RUS	Kristina Gorshkova / Vitali Butikov	446	2011/2012 season (70%)	0	149	0	115	0
76	AUT	Barbora Silná / Juri Kurakin	437	2013/2014 season (100%)	0	0	0	0	0
76	AUT	Barbora Silná / Juri Kurakin	437	2012/2013 season (100%)	0	0	0	164	0
76	AUT	Barbora Silná / Juri Kurakin	437	2011/2012 season (70%)	0	0	0	158	115
77	HUN	Carolina Moscheni / Ádám Lukács	423	2013/2014 season (100%)	127	148	148	0	0
77	HUN	Carolina Moscheni / Ádám Lukács	423	2012/2013 season (100%)	0	0	0	0	0
77	HUN	Carolina Moscheni / Ádám Lukács	423	2011/2012 season (70%)	0	0	0	0	0
78	KAZ	Ksenia Korobkova / Daryn Zhunussov	419	2013/2014 season (100%)	237	0	0	182	0
78	KAZ	Ksenia Korobkova / Daryn Zhunussov	419	2012/2013 season (100%)	0	0	0	0	0
78	KAZ	Ksenia Korobkova / Daryn Zhunussov	419	2011/2012 season (70%)	0	0	0	0	0
79	RUS	Alla Loboda / Pavel Drozd	406	2013/2014 season (100%)	0	203	203	0	0
79	RUS	Alla Loboda / Pavel Drozd	406	2012/2013 season (100%)	0	0	0	0	0
79	RUS	Alla Loboda / Pavel Drozd	406	2011/2012 season (70%)	0	0	0	0	0
80	CHN	Yue Zhao / Chang Liu	390	2013/2014 season (100%)	293	97	0	0	0
80	CHN	Yue Zhao / Chang Liu	390	2012/2013 season (100%)	0	0	0	0	0
80	CHN	Yue Zhao / Chang Liu	390	2011/2012 season (70%)	0	0	0	0	0
81	UZB	Elizaveta Tretiakov / Viktor Kovalenko	374	2013/2014 season (100%)	192	0	0	182	0
81	UZB	Elizaveta Tretiakov / Viktor Kovalenko	374	2012/2013 season (100%)	0	0	0	0	0
81	UZB	Elizaveta Tretiakov / Viktor Kovalenko	374	2011/2012 season (70%)	0	0	0	0	0
82	GBR	Charlotte Aiken / Josh Whidborne	367	2013/2014 season (100%)	0	0	0	0	0
82	GBR	Charlotte Aiken / Josh Whidborne	367	2012/2013 season (100%)	0	0	0	203	164
82	GBR	Charlotte Aiken / Josh Whidborne	367	2011/2012 season (70%)	0	0	0	0	0
83	ITA	Federica Bernardi / Christopher Mior	364	2013/2014 season (100%)	0	0	0	0	0
83	ITA	Federica Bernardi / Christopher Mior	364	2012/2013 season (100%)	0	0	0	182	182
83	ITA	Federica Bernardi / Christopher Mior	364	2011/2012 season (70%)	0	0	0	0	0
84	CAN	Victoria Hasegawa / Connor Hasegawa	363	2013/2014 season (100%)	0	0	0	0	0
84	CAN	Victoria Hasegawa / Connor Hasegawa	363	2012/2013 season (100%)	0	133	0	0	0
84	CAN	Victoria Hasegawa / Connor Hasegawa	363	2011/2012 season (70%)	0	115	115	0	0
85	CHN	Shiyue Wang / Xinyu Liu	362	2013/2014 season (100%)	362	0	0	0	0
85	CHN	Shiyue Wang / Xinyu Liu	362	2012/2013 season (100%)	0	0	0	0	0
85	CHN	Shiyue Wang / Xinyu Liu	362	2011/2012 season (70%)	0	0	0	0	0
86	CAN	Brianna Delmaestro / Timothy Lum	328	2013/2014 season (100%)	0	164	164	0	0
86	CAN	Brianna Delmaestro / Timothy Lum	328	2012/2013 season (100%)	0	0	0	0	0
86	CAN	Brianna Delmaestro / Timothy Lum	328	2011/2012 season (70%)	0	0	0	0	0
87	KOR	Yura Min / Timothy Koleto	325	2013/2014 season (100%)	325	0	0	0	0
87	KOR	Yura Min / Timothy Koleto	325	2012/2013 season (100%)	0	0	0	0	0
87	KOR	Yura Min / Timothy Koleto	325	2011/2012 season (70%)	0	0	0	0	0
88	KAZ	Karina Uzurova / Ilias Ali	323	2013/2014 season (100%)	0	0	0	0	0
88	KAZ	Karina Uzurova / Ilias Ali	323	2012/2013 season (100%)	0	133	97	0	0
88	KAZ	Karina Uzurova / Ilias Ali	323	2011/2012 season (70%)	0	93	0	0	0
89	GRE	Carina Glastris / Nicholas Lettner	313	2013/2014 season (100%)	68	148	97	0	0
89	GRE	Carina Glastris / Nicholas Lettner	313	2012/2013 season (100%)	0	0	0	0	0
89	GRE	Carina Glastris / Nicholas Lettner	313	2011/2012 season (70%)	0	0	0	0	0
90	RUS	Kristina Baklanova / Andrei Bagin	302	2013/2014 season (100%)	0	182	0	0	0
90	RUS	Kristina Baklanova / Andrei Bagin	302	2012/2013 season (100%)	0	120	0	0	0
90	RUS	Kristina Baklanova / Andrei Bagin	302	2011/2012 season (70%)	0	0	0	0	0
91	FRA	Angelique Abachkina / Louis Thauron	300	2013/2014 season (100%)	83	120	97	0	0
91	FRA	Angelique Abachkina / Louis Thauron	300	2012/2013 season (100%)	0	0	0	0	0
91	FRA	Angelique Abachkina / Louis Thauron	300	2011/2012 season (70%)	0	0	0	0	0
92	GEO	Angelina Telegina / Otar Japaridze	295	2013/2014 season (100%)	0	0	0	182	0
92	GEO	Angelina Telegina / Otar Japaridze	295	2012/2013 season (100%)	113	0	0	0	0
92	GEO	Angelina Telegina / Otar Japaridze	295	2011/2012 season (70%)	0	0	0	0	0
93	LAT	Ksenia Pecherkina / Aleksandrs Jakushin	276	2013/2014 season (100%)	0	0	0	0	0
93	LAT	Ksenia Pecherkina / Aleksandrs Jakushin	276	2012/2013 season (100%)	0	0	0	0	0
93	LAT	Ksenia Pecherkina / Aleksandrs Jakushin	276	2011/2012 season (70%)	99	93	84	0	0
94	AUT	Kira Geil / Tobias Eisenbauer	269	2013/2014 season (100%)	0	0	0	0	0
94	AUT	Kira Geil / Tobias Eisenbauer	269	2012/2013 season (100%)	0	0	0	0	0
94	AUT	Kira Geil / Tobias Eisenbauer	269	2011/2012 season (70%)	0	0	0	142	127
95	CAN	Melinda Meng / Andrew Meng	268	2013/2014 season (100%)	0	120	0	0	0
95	CAN	Melinda Meng / Andrew Meng	268	2012/2013 season (100%)	0	148	0	0	0
95	CAN	Melinda Meng / Andrew Meng	268	2011/2012 season (70%)	0	0	0	0	0
96	JPN	Bryna Oi / Taiyo Mizutani	264	2013/2014 season (100%)	0	0	0	0	0
96	JPN	Bryna Oi / Taiyo Mizutani	264	2012/2013 season (100%)	264	0	0	0	0
96	JPN	Bryna Oi / Taiyo Mizutani	264	2011/2012 season (70%)	0	0	0	0	0
97	USA	Madeline Heritage / Nathaniel Fast	248	2013/2014 season (100%)	0	0	0	0	0
97	USA	Madeline Heritage / Nathaniel Fast	248	2012/2013 season (100%)	0	133	0	0	0
97	USA	Madeline Heritage / Nathaniel Fast	248	2011/2012 season (70%)	0	115	0	0	0
98	CZE	Cortney Mansour / Michal Ceska	238	2013/2014 season (100%)	141	97	0	0	0
98	CZE	Cortney Mansour / Michal Ceska	238	2012/2013 season (100%)	0	0	0	0	0
98	CZE	Cortney Mansour / Michal Ceska	238	2011/2012 season (70%)	0	0	0	0	0
99	UKR	Valeria Gaistruk / Alexei Olejnik	228	2013/2014 season (100%)	0	120	108	0	0
99	UKR	Valeria Gaistruk / Alexei Olejnik	228	2012/2013 season (100%)	0	0	0	0	0
99	UKR	Valeria Gaistruk / Alexei Olejnik	228	2011/2012 season (70%)	0	0	0	0	0
99	MEX	Corenne Bruhns / Ryan Van Natten	228	2013/2014 season (100%)	0	0	0	0	0
99	MEX	Corenne Bruhns / Ryan Van Natten	228	2012/2013 season (100%)	0	0	0	0	0
99	MEX	Corenne Bruhns / Ryan Van Natten	228	2011/2012 season (70%)	228	0	0	0	0
101	RUS	Maria Simonova / Dmitriy Dragun	224	2013/2014 season (100%)	0	0	0	0	0
101	RUS	Maria Simonova / Dmitriy Dragun	224	2012/2013 season (100%)	0	120	0	0	0
101	RUS	Maria Simonova / Dmitriy Dragun	224	2011/2012 season (70%)	0	104	0	0	0
102	EST	Johanna Allik / Paul Michael Bellantuono	217	2013/2014 season (100%)	0	0	0	0	0
102	EST	Johanna Allik / Paul Michael Bellantuono	217	2012/2013 season (100%)	0	120	97	0	0
102	EST	Johanna Allik / Paul Michael Bellantuono	217	2011/2012 season (70%)	0	0	0	0	0
103	ESP	Celia Robledo / Luis Fenero	211	2013/2014 season (100%)	0	0	0	0	0
103	ESP	Celia Robledo / Luis Fenero	211	2012/2013 season (100%)	103	108	0	0	0
103	ESP	Celia Robledo / Luis Fenero	211	2011/2012 season (70%)	0	0	0	0	0
104	ITA	Alessia Busi / Andrea Fabbri	201	2013/2014 season (100%)	0	0	0	0	0
104	ITA	Alessia Busi / Andrea Fabbri	201	2012/2013 season (100%)	93	108	0	0	0
104	ITA	Alessia Busi / Andrea Fabbri	201	2011/2012 season (70%)	0	0	0	0	0
105	ISR	Allison Reed / Vasili Rogov	182	2013/2014 season (100%)	0	0	0	182	0
105	ISR	Allison Reed / Vasili Rogov	182	2012/2013 season (100%)	0	0	0	0	0
105	ISR	Allison Reed / Vasili Rogov	182	2011/2012 season (70%)	0	0	0	0	0
105	CZE	Gabriela Kubova / Matej Novák	182	2013/2014 season (100%)	0	0	0	182	0
105	CZE	Gabriela Kubova / Matej Novák	182	2012/2013 season (100%)	0	0	0	0	0
105	CZE	Gabriela Kubova / Matej Novák	182	2011/2012 season (70%)	0	0	0	0	0
107	FRA	Tiffany Zahorski / Alexis Miart	175	2013/2014 season (100%)	0	0	0	0	0
107	FRA	Tiffany Zahorski / Alexis Miart	175	2012/2013 season (100%)	0	0	0	0	0
107	FRA	Tiffany Zahorski / Alexis Miart	175	2011/2012 season (70%)	0	0	0	175	0
108	CAN	Elisabeth Paradis / Francois-Xavier Ouellette	164	2013/2014 season (100%)	0	0	0	164	0
108	CAN	Elisabeth Paradis / Francois-Xavier Ouellette	164	2012/2013 season (100%)	0	0	0	0	0
108	CAN	Elisabeth Paradis / Francois-Xavier Ouellette	164	2011/2012 season (70%)	0	0	0	0	0
108	BLR	Lesia Volodenkova / Vitali Vakunov	164	2013/2014 season (100%)	0	0	0	0	0
108	BLR	Lesia Volodenkova / Vitali Vakunov	164	2012/2013 season (100%)	0	0	0	164	0
108	BLR	Lesia Volodenkova / Vitali Vakunov	164	2011/2012 season (70%)	0	0	0	0	0
108	UKR	Nadezhda Frolenkova / Vitali Nikiforov	164	2013/2014 season (100%)	0	0	0	164	0
108	UKR	Nadezhda Frolenkova / Vitali Nikiforov	164	2012/2013 season (100%)	0	0	0	0	0
108	UKR	Nadezhda Frolenkova / Vitali Nikiforov	164	2011/2012 season (70%)	0	0	0	0	0
108	UKR	Anastasia Galyeta / Avidan Brown	164	2013/2014 season (100%)	0	0	0	164	0
108	UKR	Anastasia Galyeta / Avidan Brown	164	2012/2013 season (100%)	0	0	0	0	0
108	UKR	Anastasia Galyeta / Avidan Brown	164	2011/2012 season (70%)	0	0	0	0	0
108	CAN	Danielle Wu / Spencer Soo	164	2013/2014 season (100%)	0	164	0	0	0
108	CAN	Danielle Wu / Spencer Soo	164	2012/2013 season (100%)	0	0	0	0	0
108	CAN	Danielle Wu / Spencer Soo	164	2011/2012 season (70%)	0	0	0	0	0
108	USA	Chloe Lewis / Logan Bye	164	2013/2014 season (100%)	0	164	0	0	0
108	USA	Chloe Lewis / Logan Bye	164	2012/2013 season (100%)	0	0	0	0	0
108	USA	Chloe Lewis / Logan Bye	164	2011/2012 season (70%)	0	0	0	0	0
114	UKR	Anastasia Chiriyatyeva / Sergei Shevchenko	148	2013/2014 season (100%)	0	0	0	0	0
114	UKR	Anastasia Chiriyatyeva / Sergei Shevchenko	148	2012/2013 season (100%)	0	148	0	0	0
114	UKR	Anastasia Chiriyatyeva / Sergei Shevchenko	148	2011/2012 season (70%)	0	0	0	0	0
114	CAN	Carolane Soucisse / Simon Tanguay	148	2013/2014 season (100%)	0	148	0	0	0
114	CAN	Carolane Soucisse / Simon Tanguay	148	2012/2013 season (100%)	0	0	0	0	0
114	CAN	Carolane Soucisse / Simon Tanguay	148	2011/2012 season (70%)	0	0	0	0	0
116	USA	Emily Samuelson / Todd Gilles	134	2013/2014 season (100%)	0	0	0	0	0
116	USA	Emily Samuelson / Todd Gilles	134	2012/2013 season (100%)	0	0	0	0	0
116	USA	Emily Samuelson / Todd Gilles	134	2011/2012 season (70%)	0	134	0	0	0
117	CAN	Katie Desveaux / Dmitre Razgulajevs	133	2013/2014 season (100%)	0	133	0	0	0
117	CAN	Katie Desveaux / Dmitre Razgulajevs	133	2012/2013 season (100%)	0	0	0	0	0
117	CAN	Katie Desveaux / Dmitre Razgulajevs	133	2011/2012 season (70%)	0	0	0	0	0
117	ITA	Sara Ghislandi / Giona Terzo Ortenzi	133	2013/2014 season (100%)	0	133	0	0	0
117	ITA	Sara Ghislandi / Giona Terzo Ortenzi	133	2012/2013 season (100%)	0	0	0	0	0
117	ITA	Sara Ghislandi / Giona Terzo Ortenzi	133	2011/2012 season (70%)	0	0	0	0	0
117	CAN	Marieve Cyr / Benjamin Brisebois Gaudreau	133	2013/2014 season (100%)	0	0	0	0	0
117	CAN	Marieve Cyr / Benjamin Brisebois Gaudreau	133	2012/2013 season (100%)	0	133	0	0	0
117	CAN	Marieve Cyr / Benjamin Brisebois Gaudreau	133	2011/2012 season (70%)	0	0	0	0	0
117	GBR	Mina Zdravkova / Henry Aiken	133	2013/2014 season (100%)	0	133	0	0	0
117	GBR	Mina Zdravkova / Henry Aiken	133	2012/2013 season (100%)	0	0	0	0	0
117	GBR	Mina Zdravkova / Henry Aiken	133	2011/2012 season (70%)	0	0	0	0	0
121	RUS	Valeria Loseva / Denis Lunin	127	2013/2014 season (100%)	0	0	0	0	0
121	RUS	Valeria Loseva / Denis Lunin	127	2012/2013 season (100%)	0	0	0	0	0
121	RUS	Valeria Loseva / Denis Lunin	127	2011/2012 season (70%)	0	127	0	0	0
122	CZE	Jana Cejkova / Alexandr Sinicyn	120	2013/2014 season (100%)	0	0	0	0	0
122	CZE	Jana Cejkova / Alexandr Sinicyn	120	2012/2013 season (100%)	0	120	0	0	0
122	CZE	Jana Cejkova / Alexandr Sinicyn	120	2011/2012 season (70%)	0	0	0	0	0
122	GER	Kathrin Häuser / Sevan Lerche	120	2013/2014 season (100%)	0	120	0	0	0
122	GER	Kathrin Häuser / Sevan Lerche	120	2012/2013 season (100%)	0	0	0	0	0
122	GER	Kathrin Häuser / Sevan Lerche	120	2011/2012 season (70%)	0	0	0	0	0
122	UKR	Lolita Yermak / Alexei Khimich	120	2013/2014 season (100%)	0	0	0	0	0
122	UKR	Lolita Yermak / Alexei Khimich	120	2012/2013 season (100%)	0	120	0	0	0
122	UKR	Lolita Yermak / Alexei Khimich	120	2011/2012 season (70%)	0	0	0	0	0
125	USA	Tory Patsis / Joseph Johnson	108	2013/2014 season (100%)	0	108	0	0	0
125	USA	Tory Patsis / Joseph Johnson	108	2012/2013 season (100%)	0	0	0	0	0
125	USA	Tory Patsis / Joseph Johnson	108	2011/2012 season (70%)	0	0	0	0	0
125	POL	Natalia Kaliszek / Yaroslav Kurbakov	108	2013/2014 season (100%)	0	108	0	0	0
125	POL	Natalia Kaliszek / Yaroslav Kurbakov	108	2012/2013 season (100%)	0	0	0	0	0
125	POL	Natalia Kaliszek / Yaroslav Kurbakov	108	2011/2012 season (70%)	0	0	0	0	0
125	GER	Florence Clarke / Tim Dieck	108	2013/2014 season (100%)	0	108	0	0	0
125	GER	Florence Clarke / Tim Dieck	108	2012/2013 season (100%)	0	0	0	0	0
125	GER	Florence Clarke / Tim Dieck	108	2011/2012 season (70%)	0	0	0	0	0
125	GER	Lisa Enderlein / Hendrik Hilpert	108	2013/2014 season (100%)	0	0	0	0	0
125	GER	Lisa Enderlein / Hendrik Hilpert	108	2012/2013 season (100%)	0	108	0	0	0
125	GER	Lisa Enderlein / Hendrik Hilpert	108	2011/2012 season (70%)	0	0	0	0	0
125	FRA	Magalie Leininger / Maxime Caurel	108	2013/2014 season (100%)	0	0	0	0	0
125	FRA	Magalie Leininger / Maxime Caurel	108	2012/2013 season (100%)	0	108	0	0	0
125	FRA	Magalie Leininger / Maxime Caurel	108	2011/2012 season (70%)	0	0	0	0	0
130	GER	Loreen Geiler / Sven Miersch	97	2013/2014 season (100%)	0	97	0	0	0
130	GER	Loreen Geiler / Sven Miersch	97	2012/2013 season (100%)	0	0	0	0	0
130	GER	Loreen Geiler / Sven Miersch	97	2011/2012 season (70%)	0	0	0	0	0
130	USA	Whitney Miller / Kyle Macmillan	97	2013/2014 season (100%)	0	0	0	0	0
130	USA	Whitney Miller / Kyle Macmillan	97	2012/2013 season (100%)	0	97	0	0	0
130	USA	Whitney Miller / Kyle Macmillan	97	2011/2012 season (70%)	0	0	0	0	0
130	LAT	Olga Jakushina / Aleksandrs Grishins	97	2013/2014 season (100%)	0	97	0	0	0
130	LAT	Olga Jakushina / Aleksandrs Grishins	97	2012/2013 season (100%)	0	0	0	0	0
130	LAT	Olga Jakushina / Aleksandrs Grishins	97	2011/2012 season (70%)	0	0	0	0	0
133	SVK	Natalia Jancosek / Petr Seknicka	84	2013/2014 season (100%)	0	0	0	0	0
133	SVK	Natalia Jancosek / Petr Seknicka	84	2012/2013 season (100%)	0	0	0	0	0
133	SVK	Natalia Jancosek / Petr Seknicka	84	2011/2012 season (70%)	0	84	0	0	0
134	USA	Danielle Gamelin / Alexander Gamelin	76	2013/2014 season (100%)	0	0	0	0	0
134	USA	Danielle Gamelin / Alexander Gamelin	76	2012/2013 season (100%)	0	0	0	0	0
134	USA	Danielle Gamelin / Alexander Gamelin	76	2011/2012 season (70%)	0	76	0	0	0
134	NZL	Ayesha Campbell / Shane Speden	76	2013/2014 season (100%)	0	0	0	0	0
134	NZL	Ayesha Campbell / Shane Speden	76	2012/2013 season (100%)	0	0	0	0	0
134	NZL	Ayesha Campbell / Shane Speden	76	2011/2012 season (70%)	0	76	0	0	0
136	FRA	Myriam Gassoumi / Clement Le Molaire	68	2013/2014 season (100%)	0	0	0	0	0
136	FRA	Myriam Gassoumi / Clement Le Molaire	68	2012/2013 season (100%)	0	0	0	0	0
136	FRA	Myriam Gassoumi / Clement Le Molaire	68	2011/2012 season (70%)	0	68	0	0	0

== Season's World Ranking ==
The remainder of this section is a complete list, by discipline, published by the ISU.

=== Men's singles (135 skaters) ===
As of 28 March 2014

Rank	Nation	Skater	Points	Season	ISU Championships or Olympics	(Junior) Grand Prix and Final		Selected International Competition	
Rank	Nation	Skater	Points	Season	Best	Best	2nd Best	Best	2nd Best
1	JPN	Yuzuru Hanyu	2610	2013/2014 season (100%)	1200	800	360	250	0
2	JPN	Tatsuki Machida	2313	2013/2014 season (100%)	1080	583	400	250	0
3	CAN	Patrick Chan	2200	2013/2014 season (100%)	1080	720	400	0	0
4	KAZ	Denis Ten	1764	2013/2014 season (100%)	972	292	0	250	250
5	RUS	Maxim Kovtun	1760	2013/2014 season (100%)	875	525	360	0	0
6	ESP	Javier Fernandez	1558	2013/2014 season (100%)	972	324	262	0	0
7	JPN	Takahito Mura	1551	2013/2014 season (100%)	840	236	0	250	225
8	CHN	Han Yan	1510	2013/2014 season (100%)	638	472	400	0	0
9	JPN	Daisuke Takahashi	1401	2013/2014 season (100%)	709	400	292	0	0
10	RUS	Konstantin Menshov	1388	2013/2014 season (100%)	680	292	191	225	0
11	GER	Peter Liebers	1385	2013/2014 season (100%)	574	213	213	203	182
12	USA	Max Aaron	1361	2013/2014 season (100%)	574	324	213	250	0
13	USA	Jeremy Abbott	1347	2013/2014 season (100%)	787	324	236	0	0
14	USA	Jason Brown	1328	2013/2014 season (100%)	517	324	262	225	0
15	JPN	Takahiko Kozuka	1316	2013/2014 season (100%)	756	324	236	0	0
16	JPN	Nobunari Oda	1258	2013/2014 season (100%)	0	648	360	250	0
17	USA	Richard Dornbush	1257	2013/2014 season (100%)	551	262	262	182	0
18	RUS	Sergei Voronov	1256	2013/2014 season (100%)	756	0	0	250	250
19	SWE	Alexander Majorov	1209	2013/2014 season (100%)	305	213	191	250	250
20	CZE	Michal Brezina	1166	2013/2014 season (100%)	612	292	262	0	0
21	CHN	Nan Song	1107	2013/2014 season (100%)	680	236	191	0	0
22	USA	Adam Rippon	1054	2013/2014 season (100%)	402	360	292	0	0
23	RUS	Alexander Petrov	1045	2013/2014 season (100%)	365	230	225	225	0
24	RUS	Adian Pitkeev	1015	2013/2014 season (100%)	450	315	250	0	0
25	CZE	Tomáš Verner	965	2013/2014 season (100%)	465	0	0	250	250
26	USA	Joshua Farris	961	2013/2014 season (100%)	496	262	0	203	0
27	FRA	Chafik Besseghier	945	2013/2014 season (100%)	517	0	0	225	203
28	USA	Nathan Chen	939	2013/2014 season (100%)	405	284	250	0	0
29	UZB	Misha Ge	903	2013/2014 season (100%)	237	191	0	250	225
30	CHN	Boyang Jin	895	2013/2014 season (100%)	295	350	250	0	0
31	RUS	Artur Gachinski	855	2013/2014 season (100%)	0	236	191	225	203
32	ITA	Ivan Righini	792	2013/2014 season (100%)	339	0	0	250	203
33	BEL	Jorik Hendrickx	790	2013/2014 season (100%)	362	0	0	225	203
34	JPN	Keiji Tanaka	771	2013/2014 season (100%)	266	255	250	0	0
35	PHI	Michael Christian Martinez	747	2013/2014 season (100%)	180	203	182	182	0
36	BLR	Pavel Ignatenko	738	2013/2014 season (100%)	113	120	120	203	182
37	KOR	June Hyoung Lee	729	2013/2014 season (100%)	214	164	148	203	0
38	JPN	Shoma Uno	713	2013/2014 season (100%)	328	203	182	0	0
39	CZE	Petr Coufal	712	2013/2014 season (100%)	194	133	0	203	182
40	AUS	Brendan Kerry	691	2013/2014 season (100%)	113	164	164	250	0
41	CAN	Elladj Balde	688	2013/2014 season (100%)	293	213	0	182	0
42	FRA	Florent Amodio	686	2013/2014 season (100%)	237	236	213	0	0
43	CAN	Nam Nguyen	682	2013/2014 season (100%)	500	182	0	0	0
44	RUS	Mikhail Kolyada	678	2013/2014 season (100%)	0	225	203	250	0
45	JPN	Ryuju Hino	675	2013/2014 season (100%)	0	225	225	225	0
46	ISR	Alexei Bychenko	671	2013/2014 season (100%)	325	0	0	182	164
47	PHI	Christopher Caluza	653	2013/2014 season (100%)	264	0	0	225	164
48	FRA	Brian Joubert	627	2013/2014 season (100%)	402	0	0	225	0
49	CHN	He Zhang	602	2013/2014 season (100%)	174	225	203	0	0
50	SUI	Stephane Walker	588	2013/2014 season (100%)	156	0	0	250	182
51	TPE	Chih-I Tsao	585	2013/2014 season (100%)	140	148	133	164	0
52	GER	Franz Streubel	581	2013/2014 season (100%)	192	0	0	225	164
53	CAN	Jeremy Ten	565	2013/2014 season (100%)	362	0	0	203	0
54	KOR	Jin Seo Kim	543	2013/2014 season (100%)	247	148	148	0	0
55	ISR	Daniel Samohin	542	2013/2014 season (100%)	157	203	182	0	0
56	JPN	Daisuke Murakami	475	2013/2014 season (100%)	0	0	0	250	225
57	USA	Jordan Moeller	471	2013/2014 season (100%)	215	148	108	0	0
58	LAT	Deniss Vasiljevs	469	2013/2014 season (100%)	239	133	97	0	0
59	DEN	Justus Strid	450	2013/2014 season (100%)	0	0	0	225	225
60	CHN	Jinlin Guan	446	2013/2014 season (100%)	446	0	0	0	0
61	AUT	Viktor Pfeifer	439	2013/2014 season (100%)	214	0	0	225	0
62	RUS	Zhan Bush	428	2013/2014 season (100%)	0	0	0	225	203
63	AUS	David Kranjec	424	2013/2014 season (100%)	102	97	0	225	0
64	CHN	Wenbo Zang	423	2013/2014 season (100%)	93	182	148	0	0
65	CAN	Kevin Reynolds	418	2013/2014 season (100%)	418	0	0	0	0
66	KAZ	Abzal Rakimgaliev	395	2013/2014 season (100%)	192	0	0	203	0
67	ITA	Matteo Rizzo	389	2013/2014 season (100%)	0	0	0	225	164
68	RUS	Moris Kvitelashvili	385	2013/2014 season (100%)	0	203	182	0	0
68	RUS	Sergei Borodulin	385	2013/2014 season (100%)	0	0	0	203	182
70	UKR	Ivan Pavlov	367	2013/2014 season (100%)	114	133	120	0	0
71	GER	Paul Fentz	364	2013/2014 season (100%)	0	0	0	182	182
72	ITA	Maurizio Zandron	346	2013/2014 season (100%)	0	0	0	182	164
73	GBR	Graham Newberry	336	2013/2014 season (100%)	75	164	97	0	0
74	POL	Maciej Cieplucha	334	2013/2014 season (100%)	131	0	0	203	0
75	RUS	Vladislav Sesganov	328	2013/2014 season (100%)	0	0	0	164	164
76	FRA	Charles Tetar	323	2013/2014 season (100%)	0	120	0	203	0
77	KOR	Dong Won Lee	290	2013/2014 season (100%)	126	0	0	164	0
78	MAS	Julian Zhi Jie Yee	286	2013/2014 season (100%)	83	0	0	203	0
79	JPN	Shu Nakamura	272	2013/2014 season (100%)	0	164	108	0	0
80	CAN	Roman Sadovsky	261	2013/2014 season (100%)	141	120	0	0	0
81	RUS	Evgeni Plushenko	250	2013/2014 season (100%)	0	0	0	250	0
81	GER	Martin Rappe	250	2013/2014 season (100%)	0	0	0	250	0
83	JPN	Sei Kawahara	241	2013/2014 season (100%)	0	133	108	0	0
84	PHI	Maverick Eguia	238	2013/2014 season (100%)	74	0	0	164	0
85	USA	Douglas Razzano	225	2013/2014 season (100%)	0	0	0	225	0
85	USA	Stephen Carriere	225	2013/2014 season (100%)	0	0	0	225	0
87	FRA	Simon Hocquaux	224	2013/2014 season (100%)	127	97	0	0	0
88	NOR	Sondre Oddvoll Bøe	208	2013/2014 season (100%)	44	0	0	164	0
89	FRA	Antoine Pierre	203	2013/2014 season (100%)	0	0	0	203	0
89	RUS	Artem Lezheev	203	2013/2014 season (100%)	0	0	0	203	0
89	GER	Christopher Berneck	203	2013/2014 season (100%)	0	0	0	203	0
89	RUS	Gordei Gorshkov	203	2013/2014 season (100%)	0	0	0	203	0
89	RUS	Murad Kurbanov	203	2013/2014 season (100%)	0	203	0	0	0
89	ITA	Paolo Bacchini	203	2013/2014 season (100%)	0	0	0	203	0
89	FIN	Valtter Virtanen	203	2013/2014 season (100%)	0	0	0	203	0
96	CAN	Andrei Rogozine	191	2013/2014 season (100%)	0	191	0	0	0
97	RUS	Alexander Samarin	182	2013/2014 season (100%)	0	182	0	0	0
97	RUS	Artur Dmitriev	182	2013/2014 season (100%)	0	0	0	182	0
97	GBR	Charlie Parry-Evans	182	2013/2014 season (100%)	0	0	0	182	0
97	USA	Grant Hochstein	182	2013/2014 season (100%)	0	0	0	182	0
97	PRK	Hyon Choe	182	2013/2014 season (100%)	0	0	0	182	0
97	AUS	Mark Webster	182	2013/2014 season (100%)	0	0	0	182	0
97	BLR	Mikhail Karaliuk	182	2013/2014 season (100%)	0	0	0	182	0
97	USA	Ross Miner	182	2013/2014 season (100%)	0	0	0	182	0
97	FIN	Viktor Zubik	182	2013/2014 season (100%)	0	0	0	182	0
106	MON	Kim Lucine	173	2013/2014 season (100%)	173	0	0	0	0
106	CHN	Yi Wang	173	2013/2014 season (100%)	173	0	0	0	0
108	JPN	Akio Sasaki	164	2013/2014 season (100%)	0	0	0	164	0
108	RUS	Andrei Lazukin	164	2013/2014 season (100%)	0	164	0	0	0
108	FRA	Florian Lejeune	164	2013/2014 season (100%)	0	0	0	164	0
108	RUS	Kirill Sokolov	164	2013/2014 season (100%)	0	0	0	164	0
108	BUL	Manol Atanassov	164	2013/2014 season (100%)	0	0	0	164	0
108	USA	Shotaro Omori	164	2013/2014 season (100%)	0	164	0	0	0
108	ARM	Slavik Hayrapetyan	164	2013/2014 season (100%)	0	0	0	164	0
108	ISR	Stanislav Samohin	164	2013/2014 season (100%)	0	0	0	164	0
116	UKR	Yakov Godorozha	162	2013/2014 season (100%)	162	0	0	0	0
117	GER	Panagiotis Polizoakis	148	2013/2014 season (100%)	0	148	0	0	0
118	ROU	Zoltán Kelemen	146	2013/2014 season (100%)	146	0	0	0	0
119	ESP	Javier Raya	140	2013/2014 season (100%)	140	0	0	0	0
120	GBR	Peter James Hallam	133	2013/2014 season (100%)	0	133	0	0	0
120	CZE	Tomas Kupka	133	2013/2014 season (100%)	0	133	0	0	0
122	GER	Alexander Bjelde	120	2013/2014 season (100%)	0	120	0	0	0
122	UKR	Igor Reznichenko	120	2013/2014 season (100%)	0	120	0	0	0
124	RUS	Alexei Genia	108	2013/2014 season (100%)	0	108	0	0	0
124	CZE	Jan Kurnik	108	2013/2014 season (100%)	0	108	0	0	0
124	FIN	Matthias Versluis	108	2013/2014 season (100%)	0	108	0	0	0
124	JPN	Taichiro Yamakuma	108	2013/2014 season (100%)	0	108	0	0	0
128	EST	Viktor Romanenkov	106	2013/2014 season (100%)	106	0	0	0	0
129	CAN	Leslie Ip	97	2013/2014 season (100%)	0	97	0	0	0
129	GER	Niko Ulanovsky	97	2013/2014 season (100%)	0	97	0	0	0
129	JPN	Taichi Honda	97	2013/2014 season (100%)	0	97	0	0	0
132	TPE	Jordan Ju	92	2013/2014 season (100%)	92	0	0	0	0
133	ITA	Paul Bonifacio Parkinson	83	2013/2014 season (100%)	83	0	0	0	0
134	SWE	Illya Solomin	55	2013/2014 season (100%)	55	0	0	0	0
135	ESP	Victor Bustamante	49	2013/2014 season (100%)	49	0	0	0	0

=== Ladies' singles (149 skaters) ===
As of 29 March 2014

Rank	Nation	Skater	Points	Season	ISU Championships or Olympics	(Junior) Grand Prix and Final		Selected International Competition	
Rank	Nation	Skater	Points	Season	Best	Best	2nd Best	Best	2nd Best
1	RUS	Yulia Lipnitskaya	2450	2013/2014 season (100%)	1080	720	400	250	0
2	JPN	Mao Asada	2400	2013/2014 season (100%)	1200	800	400	0	0
3	RUS	Adelina Sotnikova	2085	2013/2014 season (100%)	1200	525	360	0	0
4	RUS	Anna Pogorilaya	1747	2013/2014 season (100%)	875	472	400	0	0
5	USA	Gracie Gold	1716	2013/2014 season (100%)	875	324	292	225	0
6	RUS	Elena Radionova	1693	2013/2014 season (100%)	500	583	360	250	0
7	USA	Ashley Wagner	1686	2013/2014 season (100%)	638	648	400	0	0
8	ITA	Carolina Kostner	1656	2013/2014 season (100%)	972	360	324	0	0
9	JPN	Akiko Suzuki	1618	2013/2014 season (100%)	709	360	324	225	0
10	JPN	Satoko Miyahara	1530	2013/2014 season (100%)	756	262	262	250	0
11	JPN	Kanako Murakami	1345	2013/2014 season (100%)	840	292	213	0	0
12	KOR	Yuna Kim	1330	2013/2014 season (100%)	1080	0	0	250	0
13	JPN	Haruka Imai	1323	2013/2014 season (100%)	612	236	0	250	225
14	USA	Courtney Hicks	1287	2013/2014 season (100%)	551	236	0	250	250
15	ITA	Valentina Marchei	1195	2013/2014 season (100%)	496	236	213	250	0
16	USA	Samantha Cesario	1159	2013/2014 season (100%)	402	292	262	203	0
17	USA	Polina Edmunds	1079	2013/2014 season (100%)	574	255	250	0	0
18	FRA	Maé-Bérénice Méité	1049	2013/2014 season (100%)	551	262	236	0	0
19	SWE	Viktoria Helgesson	1025	2013/2014 season (100%)	214	213	191	225	182
20	USA	Mirai Nagasu	1022	2013/2014 season (100%)	325	324	191	182	0
21	RUS	Serafima Sakhanovich	1015	2013/2014 season (100%)	450	315	250	0	0
22	RUS	Elizaveta Tuktamysheva	990	2013/2014 season (100%)	0	292	292	203	203
23	RUS	Evgenia Medvedeva	939	2013/2014 season (100%)	405	284	250	0	0
24	RUS	Nikol Gosviani	928	2013/2014 season (100%)	0	262	191	250	225
25	CAN	Amelie Lacoste	926	2013/2014 season (100%)	264	262	236	164	0
26	SWE	Joshi Helgesson	862	2013/2014 season (100%)	362	0	0	250	250
27	GER	Nathalie Weinzierl	855	2013/2014 season (100%)	402	0	0	250	203
28	RUS	Alena Leonova	825	2013/2014 season (100%)	612	213	0	0	0
29	ITA	Roberta Rodeghiero	793	2013/2014 season (100%)	293	0	0	250	250
30	CAN	Alaine Chartrand	761	2013/2014 season (100%)	446	182	133	0	0
31	AUS	Brooklee Han	748	2013/2014 season (100%)	214	120	0	250	164
32	CAN	Gabrielle Daleman	724	2013/2014 season (100%)	339	203	182	0	0
33	KOR	Hae Jin Kim	713	2013/2014 season (100%)	496	120	97	0	0
34	CHN	Kexin Zhang	709	2013/2014 season (100%)	293	191	0	225	0
35	EST	Elena Glebova	696	2013/2014 season (100%)	446	0	0	250	0
36	USA	Christina Gao	686	2013/2014 season (100%)	0	292	191	203	0
37	SVK	Nicole Rajicová	682	2013/2014 season (100%)	156	120	0	203	203
38	CHN	Zijun Li	680	2013/2014 season (100%)	680	0	0	0	0
39	USA	Karen Chen	668	2013/2014 season (100%)	215	250	203	0	0
40	KOR	Da Bin Choi	641	2013/2014 season (100%)	295	182	164	0	0
41	USA	Agnes Zawadzki	631	2013/2014 season (100%)	0	236	213	182	0
41	FIN	Juulia Turkkila	631	2013/2014 season (100%)	264	0	0	203	164
43	CZE	Elizaveta Ukolova	624	2013/2014 season (100%)	131	108	0	203	182
43	JPN	Rika Hongo	624	2013/2014 season (100%)	239	203	182	0	0
45	CZE	Eliška Brezinová	614	2013/2014 season (100%)	200	0	0	250	164
46	CAN	Veronik Mallet	610	2013/2014 season (100%)	237	191	0	182	0
47	UKR	Natalia Popova	609	2013/2014 season (100%)	146	213	0	250	0
48	SWE	Isabelle Olsson	605	2013/2014 season (100%)	173	0	0	250	182
49	POL	Agata Kryger	602	2013/2014 season (100%)	102	0	0	250	250
50	SUI	Anna Ovcharova	590	2013/2014 season (100%)	162	0	0	225	203
51	RUS	Maria Sotskova	575	2013/2014 season (100%)	0	350	225	0	0
52	KAZ	Elizabet Turzynbaeva	563	2013/2014 season (100%)	174	225	164	0	0
53	KOR	Na Hyun Kim	522	2013/2014 season (100%)	194	164	164	0	0
54	FRA	Anais Ventard	520	2013/2014 season (100%)	114	0	0	203	203
55	KOR	So Youn Park	517	2013/2014 season (100%)	517	0	0	0	0
56	ITA	Giada Russo	482	2013/2014 season (100%)	0	97	0	203	182
57	RUS	Alexandra Proklova	480	2013/2014 season (100%)	0	250	230	0	0
58	AUT	Kerstin Frank	475	2013/2014 season (100%)	0	0	0	250	225
59	USA	Amber Glenn	469	2013/2014 season (100%)	266	203	0	0	0
60	ITA	Carol Bressanutti	453	2013/2014 season (100%)	0	0	0	250	203
61	SLO	Dasa Grm	450	2013/2014 season (100%)	0	0	0	225	225
61	JPN	Miki Ando	450	2013/2014 season (100%)	0	0	0	225	225
61	GER	Sarah Hecken	450	2013/2014 season (100%)	0	0	0	225	225
64	GER	Lutricia Bock	438	2013/2014 season (100%)	157	148	133	0	0
65	USA	Angela Wang	432	2013/2014 season (100%)	0	225	207	0	0
66	ITA	Francesca Rio	428	2013/2014 season (100%)	0	0	0	225	203
67	CAN	Kaetlyn Osmond	418	2013/2014 season (100%)	418	0	0	0	0
68	ISR	Danielle Montalbano	407	2013/2014 season (100%)	0	0	0	225	182
68	RUS	Polina Agafonova	407	2013/2014 season (100%)	0	0	0	225	182
70	LUX	Fleur Maxwell	406	2013/2014 season (100%)	0	0	0	203	203
71	ARM	Anastasia Galustyan	394	2013/2014 season (100%)	0	133	97	164	0
72	DEN	Anita Madsen	389	2013/2014 season (100%)	0	0	0	225	164
73	JPN	Miyabi Oba	385	2013/2014 season (100%)	0	203	182	0	0
73	JPN	Riona Kato	385	2013/2014 season (100%)	0	203	182	0	0
75	FIN	Jenni Saarinen	371	2013/2014 season (100%)	141	133	97	0	0
76	LTU	Aleksandra Golovkina	364	2013/2014 season (100%)	0	0	0	182	182
76	SLO	Nika Ceric	364	2013/2014 season (100%)	0	0	0	182	182
78	MEX	Reyna Hamui	351	2013/2014 season (100%)	126	0	0	225	0
79	TUR	Birce Atabey	346	2013/2014 season (100%)	0	0	0	182	164
80	FRA	Laurine Lecavelier	345	2013/2014 season (100%)	237	108	0	0	0
80	RUS	Natalia Ogoreltseva	345	2013/2014 season (100%)	0	225	120	0	0
82	FIN	Liubov Efimenko	336	2013/2014 season (100%)	0	133	0	203	0
82	USA	Mariah Bell	336	2013/2014 season (100%)	0	203	133	0	0
84	GEO	Elene Gedevanishvili	325	2013/2014 season (100%)	325	0	0	0	0
85	IND	Ami Parekh	304	2013/2014 season (100%)	140	0	0	164	0
86	GBR	Jenna McCorkell	299	2013/2014 season (100%)	74	0	0	225	0
87	ESP	Marta Garcia	295	2013/2014 season (100%)	92	0	0	203	0
88	USA	Tyler Pierce	275	2013/2014 season (100%)	127	148	0	0	0
89	USA	Barbie Long	261	2013/2014 season (100%)	0	164	97	0	0
90	CAN	Julianne Séguin	256	2013/2014 season (100%)	0	148	108	0	0
91	RUS	Maria Artemieva	250	2013/2014 season (100%)	0	0	0	250	0
91	JPN	Mariko Kihara	250	2013/2014 season (100%)	0	0	0	250	0
91	SWE	Rebecka Emanuelsson	250	2013/2014 season (100%)	0	0	0	250	0
91	RUS	Valentina Chernishova	250	2013/2014 season (100%)	0	0	0	250	0
95	NOR	Anine Rabe	225	2013/2014 season (100%)	0	0	0	225	0
95	NOR	Camilla Gjersem	225	2013/2014 season (100%)	0	0	0	225	0
95	RUS	Elizaveta Iushenko	225	2013/2014 season (100%)	0	225	0	0	0
95	USA	Kiri Baga	225	2013/2014 season (100%)	0	0	0	225	0
95	RUS	Maria Stavitskaia	225	2013/2014 season (100%)	0	0	0	225	0
100	CAN	Larkyn Austman	223	2013/2014 season (100%)	103	120	0	0	0
101	SVK	Bronislava Dobiasova	213	2013/2014 season (100%)	49	0	0	164	0
102	USA	Ashley Cain	203	2013/2014 season (100%)	0	0	0	203	0
102	EST	Helery Hälvin	203	2013/2014 season (100%)	0	0	0	203	0
102	PHI	Melissa Bulanhagui	203	2013/2014 season (100%)	0	0	0	203	0
102	SUI	Myriam Leuenberger	203	2013/2014 season (100%)	0	0	0	203	0
102	SUI	Tanja Odermatt	203	2013/2014 season (100%)	0	0	0	203	0
107	CHN	Ziquan Zhao	192	2013/2014 season (100%)	192	0	0	0	0
108	ITA	Caterina Andermarcher	182	2013/2014 season (100%)	0	0	0	182	0
108	SUI	Eveline Brunner	182	2013/2014 season (100%)	0	0	0	182	0
108	ITA	Guia Maria Tagliapietra	182	2013/2014 season (100%)	0	0	0	182	0
108	KOR	Hwi Choi	182	2013/2014 season (100%)	0	0	0	182	0
108	BEL	Isabelle Pieman	182	2013/2014 season (100%)	0	0	0	182	0
108	ITA	Micol Cristini	182	2013/2014 season (100%)	0	0	0	182	0
108	ESP	Sonia Lafuente	182	2013/2014 season (100%)	0	0	0	182	0
108	RUS	Svetlana Lebedava	182	2013/2014 season (100%)	0	0	0	182	0
116	KOR	Tae Kyung Kim	173	2013/2014 season (100%)	173	0	0	0	0
117	BRA	Isadora Williams	164	2013/2014 season (100%)	0	0	0	164	0
117	BLR	Janina Makeenka	164	2013/2014 season (100%)	0	0	0	164	0
117	GER	Jennifer Parker	164	2013/2014 season (100%)	0	0	0	164	0
117	JPN	Mai Mihara	164	2013/2014 season (100%)	0	164	0	0	0
117	SRB	Mila Petrovic	164	2013/2014 season (100%)	0	0	0	164	0
117	SUI	Nicole Graf	164	2013/2014 season (100%)	0	0	0	164	0
117	ITA	Sara Casella	164	2013/2014 season (100%)	0	0	0	164	0
117	USA	Vanessa Lam	164	2013/2014 season (100%)	0	0	0	164	0
125	PHI	Alisson Krystle Perticheto	156	2013/2014 season (100%)	156	0	0	0	0
126	JPN	Kaori Sakamoto	148	2013/2014 season (100%)	0	148	0	0	0
126	CAN	Madelyn Dunley	148	2013/2014 season (100%)	0	148	0	0	0
126	HKG	Maisy Hiu Ching Ma	148	2013/2014 season (100%)	0	148	0	0	0
126	USA	Yasmin Siraj	148	2013/2014 season (100%)	0	148	0	0	0
130	LTU	Inga Janulevičiūtė	140	2013/2014 season (100%)	140	0	0	0	0
131	RUS	Alsu Kaiumova	133	2013/2014 season (100%)	0	133	0	0	0
132	NOR	Anne Line Gjersem	131	2013/2014 season (100%)	131	0	0	0	0
133	AUS	Chantelle Kerry	120	2013/2014 season (100%)	0	120	0	0	0
133	JPN	Yuka Nagai	120	2013/2014 season (100%)	0	120	0	0	0
135	TPE	Crystal Kiang	113	2013/2014 season (100%)	113	0	0	0	0
135	BEL	Kaat Van Daele	113	2013/2014 season (100%)	113	0	0	0	0
137	CAN	Julianne Delaurier	108	2013/2014 season (100%)	0	108	0	0	0
137	KOR	Kyueun Kim	108	2013/2014 season (100%)	0	108	0	0	0
137	CAN	Sandrine Martin	108	2013/2014 season (100%)	0	108	0	0	0
137	JPN	Yura Matsuda	108	2013/2014 season (100%)	0	108	0	0	0
141	RSA	Lejeanne Marais	102	2013/2014 season (100%)	102	0	0	0	0
142	GER	Maria-Katharina Herceg	97	2013/2014 season (100%)	0	97	0	0	0
142	CHN	Xiangning Li	97	2013/2014 season (100%)	0	97	0	0	0
144	UKR	Anna Khnychenkova	93	2013/2014 season (100%)	93	0	0	0	0
145	DEN	Pernille Sorensen	83	2013/2014 season (100%)	83	0	0	0	0
146	LAT	Angelina Kuchvalska	75	2013/2014 season (100%)	75	0	0	0	0
147	EST	Gerli Liinamäe	68	2013/2014 season (100%)	68	0	0	0	0
148	SUI	Matilde Gianocca	61	2013/2014 season (100%)	61	0	0	0	0
149	LTU	Deimante Kizalaite	55	2013/2014 season (100%)	55	0	0	0	0

=== Pairs (72 couples) ===
As of 27 March 2014

Rank	Nation	Couple	Points	Season	ISU Championships or Olympics	(Junior) Grand Prix and Final		Selected International Competition	
Rank	Nation	Couple	Points	Season	Best	Best	2nd Best	Best	2nd Best
1	RUS	Tatiana Volosozhar / Maxim Trankov	2570	2013/2014 season (100%)	1200	720	400	250	0
2	GER	Aliona Savchenko / Robin Szolkowy	2400	2013/2014 season (100%)	1200	800	400	0	0
3	CAN	Kirsten Moore-Towers / Dylan Moscovitch	1957	2013/2014 season (100%)	875	472	360	250	0
4	RUS	Ksenia Stolbova / Fedor Klimov	1946	2013/2014 season (100%)	1080	324	292	250	0
5	CHN	Qing Pang / Jian Tong	1923	2013/2014 season (100%)	875	648	400	0	0
6	CAN	Meagan Duhamel / Eric Radford	1857	2013/2014 season (100%)	972	525	360	0	0
7	ITA	Stefania Berton / Ondrej Hotárek	1774	2013/2014 season (100%)	612	400	262	250	250
8	CHN	Cheng Peng / Hao Zhang	1730	2013/2014 season (100%)	787	583	360	0	0
9	CHN	Wenjing Sui / Cong Han	1524	2013/2014 season (100%)	840	360	324	0	0
10	USA	Alexa Scimeca / Chris Knierim	1381	2013/2014 season (100%)	680	262	236	203	0
11	RUS	Vera Bazarova / Yuri Larionov	1361	2013/2014 season (100%)	709	360	292	0	0
12	USA	Haven Denney / Brandon Frazier	1318	2013/2014 season (100%)	612	262	262	182	0
13	RUS	Julia Antipova / Nodari Maisuradze	1268	2013/2014 season (100%)	574	262	0	250	182
14	USA	Marissa Castelli / Simon Shnapir	1227	2013/2014 season (100%)	517	292	236	182	0
15	USA	Tarah Kayne / Danny O'Shea	1162	2013/2014 season (100%)	756	0	0	203	203
16	CHN	Xiaoyu Yu / Yang Jin	1100	2013/2014 season (100%)	500	350	250	0	0
17	CAN	Paige Lawrence / Rudi Swiegers	1069	2013/2014 season (100%)	377	292	236	164	0
18	GER	Mari Vartmann / Aaron Van Cleave	981	2013/2014 season (100%)	362	213	0	203	203
19	RUS	Maria Vigalova / Egor Zakroev	970	2013/2014 season (100%)	405	315	250	0	0
20	GER	Maylin Wende / Daniel Wende	946	2013/2014 season (100%)	496	0	0	225	225
21	RUS	Evgenia Tarasova / Vladimir Morozov	930	2013/2014 season (100%)	450	255	225	0	0
22	CAN	Margaret Purdy / Michael Marinaro	878	2013/2014 season (100%)	496	191	191	0	0
23	RUS	Anastasia Martiusheva / Alexei Rogonov	876	2013/2014 season (100%)	0	213	213	225	225
24	USA	Caydee Denney / John Coughlin	841	2013/2014 season (100%)	0	324	292	225	0
25	USA	Felicia Zhang / Nathan Bartholomay	826	2013/2014 season (100%)	377	236	213	0	0
26	RUS	Vasilisa Davankova / Andrei Deputat	820	2013/2014 season (100%)	365	230	225	0	0
27	FRA	Vanessa James / Morgan Ciprès	813	2013/2014 season (100%)	551	262	0	0	0
28	CAN	Natasha Purich / Mervin Tran	787	2013/2014 season (100%)	551	236	0	0	0
29	ITA	Alessandra Cernuschi / Filippo Ambrosini	770	2013/2014 season (100%)	239	203	164	164	0
30	RUS	Lina Fedorova / Maxim Miroshkin	759	2013/2014 season (100%)	0	284	250	225	0
31	ITA	Nicole Della Monica / Matteo Guarise	757	2013/2014 season (100%)	402	191	0	164	0
32	USA	Madeline Aaron / Max Settlage	735	2013/2014 season (100%)	328	225	182	0	0
33	ISR	Andrea Davidovich / Evgeni Krasnopolski	696	2013/2014 season (100%)	446	0	0	250	0
34	FRA	Daria Popova / Bruno Massot	648	2013/2014 season (100%)	293	191	0	164	0
35	GER	Annabelle Prölss / Ruben Blommaert	645	2013/2014 season (100%)	0	213	0	250	182
36	AUT	Miriam Ziegler / Severin Kiefer	628	2013/2014 season (100%)	264	0	0	182	182
37	USA	Lindsay Davis / Rockne Brubaker	613	2013/2014 season (100%)	0	236	213	164	0
38	BLR	Maria Paliakova / Nikita Bochkov	599	2013/2014 season (100%)	214	0	0	203	182
39	CAN	Tara Hancherow / Wesley Killing	578	2013/2014 season (100%)	266	164	148	0	0
40	GBR	Amani Fancy / Christopher Boyadji	556	2013/2014 season (100%)	192	0	0	182	182
41	EST	Natalja Zabijako / Alexandr Zaboev	550	2013/2014 season (100%)	325	0	0	225	0
42	USA	Kaitlin Budd / Nikita Cheban	527	2013/2014 season (100%)	215	164	148	0	0
43	USA	Gretchen Donlan / Andrew Speroff	500	2013/2014 season (100%)	0	0	0	250	250
44	CZE	Anna Dušková / Martin Bidař	462	2013/2014 season (100%)	194	148	120	0	0
45	RUS	Kamilla Gainetdinova / Ivan Bich	457	2013/2014 season (100%)	0	250	207	0	0
46	CHN	Wenting Wang / Yan Zhang	446	2013/2014 season (100%)	446	0	0	0	0
47	RUS	Katarina Gerboldt / Alexander Enbert	428	2013/2014 season (100%)	0	0	0	225	203
47	CAN	Mary Orr / Phelan Simpson	428	2013/2014 season (100%)	295	133	0	0	0
49	RUS	Arina Cherniavskaia / Antonino Souza-Kordyeru	389	2013/2014 season (100%)	0	225	164	0	0
50	JPN	Narumi Takahashi / Ryuichi Kihara	382	2013/2014 season (100%)	0	191	191	0	0
51	CAN	Julianne Séguin / Charlie Bilodeau	364	2013/2014 season (100%)	0	182	182	0	0
52	USA	Chelsea Liu / Devin Perini	346	2013/2014 season (100%)	0	182	164	0	0
53	HKG	Marin Ono / Hon Lam To	332	2013/2014 season (100%)	127	108	97	0	0
54	LAT	Ekaterina Pribylova / Jegors Nikita Admiralovs	330	2013/2014 season (100%)	114	108	108	0	0
55	CHN	Xuehan Wang / Lei Wang	292	2013/2014 season (100%)	0	292	0	0	0
56	USA	Christina Zaitsev / Ernie Utah Stevens	268	2013/2014 season (100%)	0	148	120	0	0
57	ITA	Bianca Manacorda / Niccolo Macii	266	2013/2014 season (100%)	0	133	133	0	0
58	GER	Julia Linckh / Konrad Hocker-Scholler	261	2013/2014 season (100%)	141	120	0	0	0
59	GBR	Stacey Kemp / David King	237	2013/2014 season (100%)	237	0	0	0	0
60	USA	Jessica Calalang / Zack Sidhu	225	2013/2014 season (100%)	0	0	0	225	0
61	GBR	Molly Lanaghan / Jake Astill	217	2013/2014 season (100%)	0	120	97	0	0
62	ITA	Giulia Foresti / Luca Dematte	203	2013/2014 season (100%)	0	0	0	203	0
62	UKR	Julia Lavrentieva / Yuri Rudyk	203	2013/2014 season (100%)	0	0	0	203	0
64	CHN	Mingyang Zhang / Zhong Xie	182	2013/2014 season (100%)	0	182	0	0	0
65	USA	Aya Takai / Brian Johnson	174	2013/2014 season (100%)	174	0	0	0	0
66	GBR	Caitlin Yankowskas / Hamish Gaman	164	2013/2014 season (100%)	0	0	0	164	0
66	POL	Magdalena Klatka / Radoslaw Chruscinski	164	2013/2014 season (100%)	0	0	0	164	0
66	TUR	Olga Beständigová / İlhan Mansız	164	2013/2014 season (100%)	0	0	0	164	0
66	ESP	Veronica Grigorieva / Aritz Maestu	164	2013/2014 season (100%)	0	0	0	164	0
70	JPN	Sumire Suto / Konstantin Chizhikov	157	2013/2014 season (100%)	157	0	0	0	0
71	CAN	Dylan Conway / Dustin Sherriff-Clayton	148	2013/2014 season (100%)	0	148	0	0	0
72	GBR	Robynne Tweedale / Steven Adcock	97	2013/2014 season (100%)	0	97	0	0	0

=== Ice dance (101 couples) ===
As of 29 March 2014

Rank	Nation	Couple	Points	Season	ISU Championships or Olympics	(Junior) Grand Prix and Final		Selected International Competition	
Rank	Nation	Couple	Points	Season	Best	Best	2nd Best	Best	2nd Best
1	USA	Meryl Davis / Charlie White	2650	2013/2014 season (100%)	1200	800	400	250	0
2	CAN	Tessa Virtue / Scott Moir	2450	2013/2014 season (100%)	1080	720	400	250	0
3	CAN	Kaitlyn Weaver / Andrew Poje	2190	2013/2014 season (100%)	1080	525	360	225	0
4	ITA	Anna Cappellini / Luca Lanotte	2032	2013/2014 season (100%)	1200	472	360	0	0
5	RUS	Ekaterina Bobrova / Dmitri Soloviev	2020	2013/2014 season (100%)	787	583	400	250	0
5	FRA	Nathalie Péchalat / Fabian Bourzat	2020	2013/2014 season (100%)	972	648	400	0	0
7	USA	Madison Hubbell / Zachary Donohue	1706	2013/2014 season (100%)	840	324	292	250	0
8	USA	Madison Chock / Evan Bates	1660	2013/2014 season (100%)	787	324	324	225	0
9	RUS	Elena Ilinykh / Nikita Katsalapov	1624	2013/2014 season (100%)	972	360	292	0	0
10	GER	Nelli Zhiganshina / Alexander Gazsi	1363	2013/2014 season (100%)	446	292	236	225	164
11	USA	Maia Shibutani / Alex Shibutani	1357	2013/2014 season (100%)	709	324	324	0	0
12	GBR	Penny Coomes / Nicholas Buckland	1307	2013/2014 season (100%)	680	213	0	250	164
13	CAN	Piper Gilles / Paul Poirier	1254	2013/2014 season (100%)	756	262	236	0	0
14	FRA	Gabriella Papadakis / Guillaume Cizeron	1246	2013/2014 season (100%)	339	262	213	250	182
15	AZE	Julia Zlobina / Alexei Sitnikov	1187	2013/2014 season (100%)	496	191	0	250	250
16	RUS	Ekaterina Riazanova / Ilia Tkachenko	1135	2013/2014 season (100%)	551	292	292	0	0
17	ITA	Charlene Guignard / Marco Fabbri	1090	2013/2014 season (100%)	402	213	0	250	225
18	USA	Kaitlin Hawayek / Jean-Luc Baker	1065	2013/2014 season (100%)	500	315	250	0	0
19	RUS	Victoria Sinitsina / Ruslan Zhiganshin	1054	2013/2014 season (100%)	638	191	0	225	0
20	RUS	Anna Yanovskaya / Sergey Mozgov	1050	2013/2014 season (100%)	450	350	250	0	0
21	FRA	Pernelle Carron / Lloyd Jones	1028	2013/2014 season (100%)	275	292	236	225	0
22	CAN	Kharis Ralph / Asher Hill	997	2013/2014 season (100%)	612	0	0	203	182
23	CAN	Nicole Orford / Thomas Williams	945	2013/2014 season (100%)	551	191	0	203	0
24	USA	Alexandra Aldridge / Daniel Eaton	942	2013/2014 season (100%)	680	262	0	0	0
25	CAN	Alexandra Paul / Mitchell Islam	930	2013/2014 season (100%)	465	262	0	203	0
26	RUS	Ksenia Monko / Kirill Khaliavin	926	2013/2014 season (100%)	0	262	236	225	203
27	GER	Tanja Kolbe / Stefano Caruso	912	2013/2014 season (100%)	293	213	0	203	203
28	USA	Lorraine McNamara / Quinn Carpenter	899	2013/2014 season (100%)	365	284	250	0	0
29	CAN	Madeline Edwards / Zhao Kai Pang	833	2013/2014 season (100%)	405	225	203	0	0
30	UKR	Alexandra Nazarova / Maxim Nikitin	783	2013/2014 season (100%)	328	230	225	0	0
31	RUS	Betina Popova / Yuri Vlasenko	771	2013/2014 season (100%)	266	255	250	0	0
32	LTU	Isabella Tobias / Deividas Stagniūnas	757	2013/2014 season (100%)	362	213	0	182	0
33	ESP	Sara Hurtado / Adria Diaz	728	2013/2014 season (100%)	339	0	0	225	164
34	JPN	Cathy Reed / Chris Reed	698	2013/2014 season (100%)	200	262	236	0	0
35	USA	Rachel Parsons / Michael Parsons	689	2013/2014 season (100%)	239	225	225	0	0
36	USA	Lynn Kriengkrairut / Logan Giulietti-Schmitt	678	2013/2014 season (100%)	496	0	0	182	0
37	KOR	Rebeka Kim / Kirill Minov	641	2013/2014 season (100%)	295	182	164	0	0
38	SVK	Federica Testa / Lukáš Csölley	628	2013/2014 season (100%)	264	0	0	182	182
39	POL	Justyna Plutowska / Peter Gerber	626	2013/2014 season (100%)	173	0	0	250	203
40	CHN	Yiyi Zhang / Nan Wu	615	2013/2014 season (100%)	402	213	0	0	0
41	EST	Irina Shtork / Taavi Rand	603	2013/2014 season (100%)	214	0	0	225	164
42	TUR	Alisa Agafonova / Alper Uçar	590	2013/2014 season (100%)	162	0	0	225	203
43	DEN	Laurence Fournier Beaudry / Nikolaj Sørensen	568	2013/2014 season (100%)	140	0	0	225	203
44	UKR	Siobhan Heekin-Canedy / Dmitri Dun	558	2013/2014 season (100%)	0	191	0	203	164
45	ITA	Lorenza Alessandrini / Simone Vaturi	554	2013/2014 season (100%)	126	0	0	225	203
46	CAN	Mackenzie Bent / Garrett MacKeen	540	2013/2014 season (100%)	157	250	133	0	0
47	FIN	Henna Lindholm / Ossi Kanervo	480	2013/2014 season (100%)	113	0	0	203	164
48	FRA	Estelle Elizabeth / Romain Le Gac	471	2013/2014 season (100%)	174	164	133	0	0
49	GBR	Olivia Smart / Joseph Buckland	460	2013/2014 season (100%)	194	133	133	0	0
50	RUS	Ekaterina Pushkash / Jonathan Guerreiro	453	2013/2014 season (100%)	0	0	0	250	203
51	AUS	Danielle O'Brien / Gregory Merriman	446	2013/2014 season (100%)	446	0	0	0	0
52	BLR	Viktoria Kavaliova / Yurii Bieliaiev	426	2013/2014 season (100%)	114	164	148	0	0
53	HUN	Carolina Moscheni / Ádám Lukács	423	2013/2014 season (100%)	127	148	148	0	0
54	KAZ	Ksenia Korobkova / Daryn Zhunussov	419	2013/2014 season (100%)	237	0	0	182	0
55	RUS	Alla Loboda / Pavel Drozd	406	2013/2014 season (100%)	0	203	203	0	0
55	RUS	Daria Morozova / Mikhail Zhirnov	406	2013/2014 season (100%)	0	203	203	0	0
57	RUS	Evgenia Kosigina / Nikolai Moroshkin	397	2013/2014 season (100%)	215	182	0	0	0
58	CHN	Yue Zhao / Chang Liu	390	2013/2014 season (100%)	293	97	0	0	0
59	USA	Holly Moore / Daniel Klaber	385	2013/2014 season (100%)	0	203	182	0	0
59	RUS	Sofia Evdokimova / Egor Bazin	385	2013/2014 season (100%)	0	203	182	0	0
61	UZB	Elizaveta Tretiakov / Viktor Kovalenko	374	2013/2014 season (100%)	192	0	0	182	0
62	CHN	Shiyue Wang / Xinyu Liu	362	2013/2014 season (100%)	362	0	0	0	0
63	GER	Ria Schiffner / Julian Salatzki	331	2013/2014 season (100%)	103	120	108	0	0
64	USA	Elliana Pogrebinsky / Ross Gudis	330	2013/2014 season (100%)	0	182	148	0	0
65	CAN	Brianna Delmaestro / Timothy Lum	328	2013/2014 season (100%)	0	164	164	0	0
65	FIN	Olesia Karmi / Max Lindholm	328	2013/2014 season (100%)	0	0	0	164	164
67	KOR	Yura Min / Timothy Koleto	325	2013/2014 season (100%)	325	0	0	0	0
68	GRE	Carina Glastris / Nicholas Lettner	313	2013/2014 season (100%)	68	148	97	0	0
69	FRA	Angelique Abachkina / Louis Thauron	300	2013/2014 season (100%)	83	120	97	0	0
70	UKR	Daria Korotitskaia / Maksim Spodirev	268	2013/2014 season (100%)	0	148	120	0	0
71	JPN	Emi Hirai / Marien De La Asuncion	264	2013/2014 season (100%)	264	0	0	0	0
72	USA	Anastasia Cannuscio / Colin McManus	250	2013/2014 season (100%)	0	0	0	250	0
73	CZE	Cortney Mansour / Michal Ceska	238	2013/2014 season (100%)	141	97	0	0	0
74	CHN	Xiaoyang Yu / Chen Wang	236	2013/2014 season (100%)	0	236	0	0	0
75	UKR	Valeria Gaistruk / Alexei Olejnik	228	2013/2014 season (100%)	0	120	108	0	0
76	GER	Shari Koch / Christian Nüchtern	225	2013/2014 season (100%)	0	0	0	225	0
77	MEX	Pilar Maekawa Moreno / Leonardo Maekawa Moreno	214	2013/2014 season (100%)	214	0	0	0	0
78	RUS	Alexandra Stepanova / Ivan Bukin	191	2013/2014 season (100%)	0	191	0	0	0
79	ISR	Allison Reed / Vasili Rogov	182	2013/2014 season (100%)	0	0	0	182	0
79	GEO	Angelina Telegina / Otar Japaridze	182	2013/2014 season (100%)	0	0	0	182	0
79	CZE	Gabriela Kubova / Matej Novák	182	2013/2014 season (100%)	0	0	0	182	0
79	RUS	Kristina Baklanova / Andrei Bagin	182	2013/2014 season (100%)	0	182	0	0	0
79	CHN	Xintong Huang / Xun Zheng	182	2013/2014 season (100%)	0	0	0	182	0
84	UKR	Anastasia Galyeta / Avidan Brown	164	2013/2014 season (100%)	0	0	0	164	0
84	USA	Chloe Lewis / Logan Bye	164	2013/2014 season (100%)	0	164	0	0	0
84	CAN	Danielle Wu / Spencer Soo	164	2013/2014 season (100%)	0	164	0	0	0
84	CAN	Elisabeth Paradis / Francois-Xavier Ouellette	164	2013/2014 season (100%)	0	0	0	164	0
84	UKR	Nadezhda Frolenkova / Vitali Nikiforov	164	2013/2014 season (100%)	0	0	0	164	0
84	RUS	Valeria Zenkova / Valerie Sinitsin	164	2013/2014 season (100%)	0	0	0	164	0
90	CAN	Carolane Soucisse / Simon Tanguay	148	2013/2014 season (100%)	0	148	0	0	0
91	CAN	Katie Desveaux / Dmitre Razgulajevs	133	2013/2014 season (100%)	0	133	0	0	0
91	GBR	Mina Zdravkova / Henry Aiken	133	2013/2014 season (100%)	0	133	0	0	0
91	ITA	Sara Ghislandi / Giona Terzo Ortenzi	133	2013/2014 season (100%)	0	133	0	0	0
94	GER	Kathrin Häuser / Sevan Lerche	120	2013/2014 season (100%)	0	120	0	0	0
94	CAN	Melinda Meng / Andrew Meng	120	2013/2014 season (100%)	0	120	0	0	0
96	GER	Florence Clarke / Tim Dieck	108	2013/2014 season (100%)	0	108	0	0	0
96	POL	Natalia Kaliszek / Yaroslav Kurbakov	108	2013/2014 season (100%)	0	108	0	0	0
96	USA	Tory Patsis / Joseph Johnson	108	2013/2014 season (100%)	0	108	0	0	0
99	GER	Loreen Geiler / Sven Miersch	97	2013/2014 season (100%)	0	97	0	0	0
99	LAT	Olga Jakushina / Aleksandrs Grishins	97	2013/2014 season (100%)	0	97	0	0	0
101	TUR	Cagla Demirsal / Berk Akalin	93	2013/2014 season (100%)	93	0	0	0	0

== See also ==
- ISU World Standings
- ISU Season's World Ranking
- 2013–14 figure skating season
- 2013–14 synchronized skating season
