= 2012 World Junior Figure Skating Championships =

- Type: ISU Championship
- Date: February 27 – March 4
- Season: 2011–12
- Location: Minsk, Belarus
- Host: Skating Union of Belarus

Champions
- Men's singles: (China) Yan Han
- Ladies' singles: (Russia) Yulia Lipnitskaya
- Pairs: (China) Sui Wenjing / Han Cong
- Ice dance: (Russia) Victoria Sinitsina / Ruslan Zhiganshin
- Previous: 2011 World Junior Championships
- Next: 2013 World Junior Championships

The 2012 World Junior Figure Skating Championships was an international figure skating competition in the 2011–12 season. Commonly called "World Juniors" and "Junior Worlds", the event determined the World Junior champions in the disciplines of men's singles, ladies singles, pair skating, and ice dancing. The event was held in Minsk, Belarus from 27 February to 4 March 2012.

== Qualification ==
The competition was open to skaters from ISU member nations who were at least 13 but not 19—or 21 for male pair skaters and ice dancers—before July 1, 2011, in their place of birth. Thus, competitors had to be born before July 1, 1998, but not earlier than July 1, 1992, except male pair skaters and ice dancers who could be born no earlier than July 1, 1990. National associations selected their entries according to their own criteria.

The term "Junior" in ISU competition refers to age, not skill level. Skaters may remain age-eligible for Junior Worlds even after competing nationally and internationally at the senior level. At junior events, the ISU requires that all programs conform to junior-specific rules regarding program length, jumping passes, types of elements, etc.

=== Number of entries per discipline ===
Based on the results of the 2011 World Junior Championships, the ISU allowed each country one to three entries per discipline. Countries which qualified more than one entry in a discipline:

Spots	Men	Ladies	Pairs	Dance
3	Japan; United States	Japan; Russia; United States	Canada; China; Russia; United States	Russia; United States
2	Canada; China; Russia	Belgium; China	Czech Republic; Italy; Japan	Canada; Estonia; France; Slovakia; Spain

If not listed above, one entry was allowed.

== Entries ==
Member nations submitted the following entries: Elizaveta Tuktamysheva withdrew and was replaced by Polina Shelepen.

Country	Men	Ladies	Pairs	Ice dancing
Armenia	Slavik Hayrapetyan			
Australia	Brendan Kerry	Brooklee Han	Veera Kestila / Callum Bullard	Hannah Sparke / Lochran Doherty
Austria	Bernhard Pauli	Sabrina Schulz	Stina Martini / Severin Kiefer	
Belarus	Pavel Ignatenko	Kristina Zakharanka	Maria Paliakova / Mikhail Fomichev	Viktoria Kavaliova / Yurii Bieliaiev
Belgium		Eline Anthonissen; Anais Claes		
Brazil	Luiz Manella	Isadora Williams		
Bulgaria		Daniela Stoeva	Anjelika Ilieva / Pavel Petrov Savinov	
Canada	Liam Firus; Nam Nguyen	Kaetlyn Osmond	Katherine Bobak / Ian Beharry; Margaret Purdy / Michael Marinaro; Hayleigh Bell / Alistair Sylvester	Nicole Orford / Thomas Williams; Andréanne Poulin / Marc-André Servant
China	Yan Han; Zhang He	Li Zijun; Zhao Ziquan	Li Meiyi / Jiang Bo; Sui Wenjing / Han Cong; Yu Xiaoyu / Jin Yang	Zhang Yiyi / Wu Nan
Chinese Taipei	Chih-I Tsao	Chaochih Liu		
Croatia		Petra Juric		
Czech Republic	Petr Coufal	Elizaveta Ukolova		Karolina Prochazkova / Michal Ceska
Denmark		Anita Madsen		Stephanie Baadsgaard Snider / Stepan Dubrovski
Estonia	Viktor Romanenkov	Gerli Liinamäe		Johanna Allik / Paul Bellantuono; Irina Shtork / Taavi Rand
Finland	Matthias Versluis	Juulia Turkkila		Sara Aghai / Jussiville Partanen
France		Lenaelle Gilleron-Gorry	Camille Mendoza / Christopher Boyadji	Elektra Hetman / Benjamin Allain; Gabriella Papadakis / Guillaume Cizeron
Georgia	Armen Agaian			
Germany	Martin Rappe	Angelika Dubinski	Linda Wenzig / Matti Landgraf	Shari Koch / Christian Nuchtern
(United Kingdom) Great Britain	Harry Mattick	Kate Powell		Olivia Smart / Joseph Buckland
Grenada		Oliya Clarkson		
Hong Kong	Harry Hau Yin Lee	Sumika Yamada		
Hungary	Kristóf Forgó	Regina Borbély		Szidónia Merkwart / Ádám Lukács
Israel		Margot Krisberg		Ekaterina Bugrov / Vasili Rogov
Italy	Maurizio Zandron	Carol Bressanutti	Alessandra Cernuschi / Filippo Ambrosini; Bianca Manacorda / Nicollo Macii	Sofia Sforza / Francesco Fioretti
Japan	Ryuju Hino; Keiji Tanaka; Shoma Uno	Satoko Miyahara; Miu Sato; Risa Shoji		
Kazakhstan	Denis Ten	Regina Glazman		Karina Uzurova / Ilias Ali
Latvia		Alina Fjodorova		Ksenia Pecherkina / Aleksander Jakushin
Lithuania	Arturas Ganzela	Inga Janulevičiūtė		Ilona Birgelaite / Aivaras Stravinskas
Malaysia	Julian Zhi Jie Yee			
Mexico		Michelle Quintero		Pilar Maekawa Moreno / Leonardo Maekawa Moreno
Mongolia		Maral-Erdene Gansukh		
Netherlands	Florian Gostelie	Kim Bell	Rachel Epstein / Dmitry Epstein	
New Zealand		Madelaine Parker		Ayesha Yigit / Shane Speden
Norway		Anne Line Gjersem		
Philippines	Michael Christian Martinez			
Poland	Kamil Dymowski	Alexandra Kamieniecki	Magdalena Klatka / Radoslaw Chruscinski	Natalia Kaliszek / Michal Kaliszek
Romania	Vlad Ionescu	Sabina Mariuta		
Russia	Zhan Bush; Artur Dmitriev, Jr.	Adelina Sotnikova; Yulia Lipnitskaya; Polina Shelepen	Vasilisa Davankova / Andrei Deputat; Ekaterina Petaikina / Maxim Kurdyukov; Kamila Gainetdinova / Ivan Bich	Victoria Sinitsina / Ruslan Zhiganshin; Alexandra Stepanova / Ivan Bukin; Anna Yanovskaia / Sergey Mozgov
Serbia		Sandra Ristivojevic		
Singapore		Kai Jing Leong		
Slovakia		Monika Simancikova		
Slovenia		Patricia Glescic		
South Korea	Lee June-hyoung	Kim Hae-jin		
Spain	Víctor Bustamante	Elena Mangas	Alexandra Rodriguez / Aritz Maestu	Celia Robledo / Luis Fenero
Sweden	Marcus Björk; Nicky Obreykov	Joshi Helgesson		
Switzerland	Carlo Röthlisberger	Tina Stuerziner		Victoria Bausback / Demid Rokachev
Thailand	Suchet Kongchim	Melanie Swang		
Turkey	Osman Akgün	Sıla Saygı		Cagla Demirsal / Berk Akalin
Ukraine	Yakov Godorozha	Alina Milevskaia	Julia Lavrientieva / Yuri Rudik	Maria Nosulia / Evgen Kholoniuk
United States	Jason Brown; Joshua Farris; Timothy Dolensky	Gracie Gold; Christina Gao; Vanessa Lam	Haven Denney / Brandon Frazier; Britney Simpson / Matthew Blackmer; Kylie Duarte / Colin Grafton	Alexandra Aldridge / Daniel Eaton; Lauri Bonacorsi / Travis Mager; Rachel Parsons / Michael Parsons
Uzbekistan				Anna Nagornyuk / Viktor Kovalenko

Some skaters were required to compete in a preliminary round, while others received a direct entry into the short program, after which the number of entries could be reduced further. If a country had a non-direct entry, its lowest-ranked skater according to the Worlds Standings competed in the preliminary round.

== Schedule ==
Minsk time (UTC+03:00), subject to changes:

- Monday, February 27
  - 10:00–14:30 – Preliminary round: Men
  - 15:30–18:20 – Preliminary round: Dance
  - 19:15–22:10 – Preliminary round: Pairs
- Tuesday, February 28
  - 10:00–16:00 – Preliminary round: Ladies
- Wednesday, February 29
  - 13:00–16:50 – Short dance
  - 18:30–19:00 – Opening ceremony
  - 19:15–22:35 – Pairs' short
- Thursday, March 1
  - 13:30–17:55 – Men's short
  - 19:30–22:20 – Pairs' free
- Friday, March 2
  - 13:00–17:25 – Ladies' short
  - 19:00–22:10 – Free dance
- Saturday, March 3
  - 13:00–16:50 – Men's free
  - 18:30–22:15 – Ladies' free
- Sunday, March 4
  - 14:30–17:00 – Exhibitions

== Results ==
=== Men ===
Rank	Name	Nation	Total points	PR		SP		FS	
1	Yan Han	China	222.45			2	74.88	1	147.57
2	Joshua Farris	United States	221.97			1	75.43	2	146.54
3	Jason Brown	United States	214.90			4	70.20	3	144.70
4	Denis Ten	Kazakhstan	208.20			3	73.78	4	134.42
5	Zhan Bush	Russia	196.06			5	65.21	6	130.85
6	Zhang He	China	193.97			6	64.63	7	129.34
7	Keiji Tanaka	Japan	189.86			11	57.70	5	132.16
8	Liam Firus	Canada	189.06			7	62.10	8	126.96
9	Ryuju Hino	Japan	181.34			14	56.59	9	124.75
10	Shoma Uno	Japan	175.92			10	57.71	10	118.21
11	Martin Rappe	Germany	171.38	5	106.93	12	57.13	12	114.25
12	Timothy Dolensky	United States	169.94			9	57.73	13	112.21
13	Nam Nguyen	Canada	168.20	1	116.33	18	51.13	11	117.07
14	Artur Dmitriev Jr	Russia	166.96			8	59.36	15	107.60
15	Michael Christian Martinez	Philippines	165.10	3	109.42	16	55.32	14	109.78
16	Luiz Manella	Brazil	162.53	4	107.41	17	55.07	16	107.46
17	Petr Coufal	Czech Republic	161.10			13	56.74	17	104.36
18	Lee June-hyoung	South Korea	158.93	2	110.48	15	55.74	18	103.19
19	Harry Mattick	(United Kingdom) Great Britain	146.78	6	105.17	23	48.24	19	98.54
20	Maurizio Zandron	Italy	143.95	7	101.47	19	50.79	21	93.16
21	Matthias Versluis	Finland	143.20	8	97.05	20	49.96	20	93.74
22	Brendan Kerry	Australia	131.40	10	89.76	22	48.83	22	82.57
23	Chih-I Tsao	Chinese Taipei	129.24	12	85.15	21	49.18	23	80.06
24	Marcus Björk	Sweden	123.33			24	46.83	24	76.50
Did not advance to free skating
25	Yakov Godorozha	Ukraine				25	44.17		
26	Slavik Hayrapetyan	Armenia		11	88.31	26	43.93		
27	Carlo Röthlisberger	Switzerland		14	79.93	27	42.24		
28	Kamil Dymowski	Poland		13	84.89	28	39.43		
29	Daniel Albert Naurits	Estonia				29	37.03		
30	Pavel Ignatenko	Belarus		9	92.05	30	36.97		
Did not advance to short program
31	Víctor Bustamante	Spain		15	78.33				
32	Osman Akgün	Turkey		16	77.76				
33	Florian Gostelie	Netherlands		17	69.25				
34	Suchet Kongchim	Thailand		18	67.31				
35	Arturas Ganzela	Lithuania		19	61.54				
36	Julian Zhi Jie Yee	Malaysia		20	61.26				
37	Armen Agaian	Georgia		21	59.73				
38	Zsolt Kosz	Romania		22	57.06				
39	Wayne Wing Yin Chung	Hong Kong		23	54.38				
40	Bernhard Pauli	Austria		24	54.15				
WD	Kristóf Forgó	Hungary							

=== Ladies ===
Despite finishing out of the top 12, Belarus' Kristina Zakharanka qualified for the short program as she was the representative of the host country.

Rank	Name	Nation	Total points	PR		SP		FS	
1	Yulia Lipnitskaya	Russia	187.05			1	63.09	1	123.96
2	Gracie Gold	United States	171.85			2	58.00	2	113.85
3	Adelina Sotnikova	Russia	168.45			3	56.57	3	111.88
4	Satoko Miyahara	Japan	157.78			4	52.97	6	104.81
5	Li Zijun	China	157.31			6	51.74	5	105.57
6	Polina Shelepen	Russia	156.02			12	47.99	4	108.03
7	Christina Gao	United States	151.09			5	52.66	7	98.43
8	Kim Hae-jin	South Korea	149.71	3	93.97	7	51.56	8	98.15
9	Joshi Helgesson	Sweden	147.88	6	80.36	8	50.74	9	97.14
10	Kaetlyn Osmond	Canada	146.25	1	97.36	9	50.15	10	96.10
11	Zhao Ziquan	China	143.19	2	94.53	10	49.22	11	94.70
12	Miu Sato	Japan	141.20			13	46.50	12	94.70
13	Vanessa Lam	United States	138.94			11	48.82	13	90.12
14	Gerli Liinamäe	Estonia	125.20			17	44.54	14	80.66
15	Monika Simančíková	Slovakia	124.36			16	45.10	15	79.26
16	Isadora Williams	Brazil	123.93	12	71.30	14	46.22	18	77.71
17	Patricia Gleščič	Slovenia	122.39	7	79.69	15	45.35	19	77.04
18	Carol Bressanutti	Italy	119.40			20	41.59	17	77.81
19	Juulia Turkkila	Finland	119.21			22	41.03	16	78.18
20	Risa Shoji	Japan	113.08			18	43.13	22	69.95
21	Alina Fjodorova	Latvia	112.99	11	71.52	19	42.49	21	70.50
22	Elizaveta Ukolova	Czech Republic	110.97	4	82.09	24	39.61	20	71.36
23	Tina Stürzinger	Switzerland	108.29			21	41.39	23	66.90
24	Sabrina Schulz	Austria	104.53			23	39.93	24	64.60
Did not advance to free skating
25	Anine Rabe	Norway		9	75.26	25	39.58		
26	Anita Madsen	Denmark		8	76.70	26	39.44		
27	Lenaelle Gilleron-Gorry	France				27	39.38		
28	Angelika Dubinski	Germany		10	74.88	28	38.57		
29	Kristina Zakharanka	Belarus		14	70.12	29	36.23		
30	Brooklee Han	Australia		5	82.05	30	35.37		
31	Anais Claes	Belgium				31	28.00		
Did not advance to short program
32	Inga Janulevičiūtė	Lithuania		13	71.21				
33	Alexandra Kamieniecki	Poland		15	69.11				
34	Sıla Saygı	Turkey		16	66.38				
35	Margot Krisberg	Israel		17	66.11				
36	Katie Powell	(United Kingdom) Great Britain		18	65.01				
37	Elena Mangas	Spain		19	63.61				
38	Eline Anthonissen	Belgium		20	61.31				
39	Melanie Swang	Thailand		21	60.86				
40	Oliya Clarkson	Grenada		22	60.75				
41	Sandra Ristivojevic	Serbia		23	58.43				
42	Kim Bell	Netherlands		24	56.98				
43	Isabella Schuster	Greece		25	55.30				
44	Alina Milevska	Ukraine		26	54.00				
45	Regina Glazman	Kazakhstan		27	53.36				
46	Vasilena Yakimova	Bulgaria		28	53.23				
47	Michelle Quintero	Mexico		29	53.07				
48	Amanda Sunyoto-Yang	Chinese Taipei		30	50.79				
49	Madelaine Parker	New Zealand		31	49.37				
50	Raisa Rjenovschi	Romania		32	49.17				
51	Kai Jing Leong	Singapore		33	46.57				
52	Regina Borbély	Hungary		34	45.39				
53	Maral-Erdene Gansukh	Mongolia		35	44.20				
54	Ema Lipovscak	Croatia		36	40.40				

=== Pairs ===
Sui / Han won their third World Junior title.

Rank	Name	Nation	Total points	PR		SP		FS	
1	Sui Wenjing / Han Cong	China	175.69			1	59.29	1	116.40
2	Yu Xiaoyu / Jin Yang	China	167.48	1	96.37	2	54.72	2	112.76
3	Vasilisa Davankova / Andrei Deputat	Russia	153.66			5	50.50	3	103.16
4	Haven Denney / Brandon Frazier	United States	150.55	2	91.58	4	50.81	4	99.74
5	Margaret Purdy / Michael Marinaro	Canada	141.76			7	49.51	5	92.25
6	Ekaterina Petaikina / Maxim Kurdyukov	Russia	141.19			3	51.18	7	90.01
7	Katherine Bobak / Ian Beharry	Canada	139.89			6	49.77	6	90.12
8	Kylie Duarte / Colin Grafton	United States	133.93			8	48.24	8	85.69
9	Li Meiyi / Jiang Bo	China	128.05	3	88.48	10	46.97	11	81.08
10	Britney Simpson / Matthew Blackmer	United States	127.93			11	46.83	10	81.10
11	Kamila Gainetdinova / Ivan Bich	Russia	127.84			9	47.51	12	80.33
12	Hayleigh Bell / Alistair Sylvester	Canada	126.73	4	81.11	12	42.01	9	84.72
13	Magdalena Klatka / Radosław Chruściński	Poland	118.48	5	75.75	13	41.42	13	77.06
14	Julia Lavrentieva / Yuri Rudik	Ukraine	110.03	10	65.23	15	39.71	15	70.32
15	Stina Martini / Severin Kiefer	Austria	109.77	7	71.49	16	38.92	14	70.85
16	Camille Mendoza / Christopher Boyadji	France	109.64	6	73.64	14	40.67	16	68.97
Did not advance to free skating
17	Rachel Epstein / Dmitry Epstein	Netherlands		9	66.63	17	36.84		
18	Bianca Manacorda / Niccolo Macii	Italy		8	67.49	18	35.37		
19	Maria Paliakova / Mikhail Fomichev	Belarus		11	63.35	19	33.43		
20	Alessandra Cernuschi / Filippo Ambrosini	Italy				20	29.91		
Did not advance to short program
21	Alexandra Rodriguez / Aritz Maestu	Spain		12	59.19				
22	Veera Kestila / Callum Bullard	Australia		13	56.16				
23	Linda Wenzig / Matti Landgraf	Germany		14	52.61				
24	Anjelika Ilieva / Pavel Petrov Savinov	Bulgaria		15	51.53				

=== Ice dancing ===
All medalists were at their first World Junior Championships. In the free dance, Yanovskaia / Mozgov's music was stopped by the referee when Mozgov's bootstrap came loose.

Rank	Name	Nation	Total points	PR		SD		FD	
1	Victoria Sinitsina / Ruslan Zhiganshin	Russia	153.81			1	63.78	1	90.03
2	Alexandra Stepanova / Ivan Bukin	Russia	147.74			2	62.68	2	85.06
3	Alexandra Aldridge / Daniel Eaton	United States	141.14			5	57.76	3	83.38
4	Anna Yanovskaia / Sergey Mozgov	Russia	140.63			3	58.89	4	81.74
5	Gabriella Papadakis / Guillaume Cizeron	France	138.70			4	58.09	5	80.61
6	Nicole Orford / Thomas Williams	Canada	134.61			6	55.86	6	78.75
7	Lauri Bonacorsi / Travis Mager	United States	128.41			8	54.53	7	73.88
8	Maria Nosulia / Evgeni Kholoniuk	Ukraine	123.93			7	54.91	8	69.02
9	Shari Koch / Christian Nüchtern	Germany	117.26	1	72.36	9	51.68	10	65.58
10	Sofia Sforza / Francesco Fioretti	Italy	116.25	4	69.24	10	51.06	12	65.19
11	Irina Shtork / Taavi Rand	Estonia	115.66			11	50.75	13	64.91
12	Anna Nagornyuk / Viktor Kovalenko	Uzbekistan	112.49	3	70.40	15	45.82	9	66.67
13	Ksenia Pecherkina / Aleksandrs Jakushin	Latvia	111.11	6	64.24	14	45.84	11	65.27
14	Zhang Yiyi / Wu Nan	China	109.48	5	64.94	13	46.35	15	63.13
15	Rachel Parsons / Michael Parsons	United States	109.16			16	45.37	14	63.79
16	Sara Aghai / Jussiville Partanen	Finland	107.84	8	59.81	12	47.15	17	60.69
17	Olivia Smart / Joseph Buckland	(United Kingdom) Great Britain	106.46	7	61.19	17	45.00	16	61.46
18	Çağla Demirsal / Berk Akalın	Turkey	101.23	10	58.31	19	43.08	19	58.15
19	Viktoria Kavaliova / Yurii Bieliaiev	Belarus	100.41	9	58.99	20	42.04	18	58.37
20	Andréanne Poulin / Marc-André Servant	Canada	96.44			18	43.81	20	52.63
Did not advance to free dance
21	Karolina Prochazkova / Michal Ceska	Czech Republic		2	70.58	21	41.84		
22	Karina Uzurova / Ilias Ali	Kazakhstan		11	58.04	22	40.09		
23	Elektra Hetman / Benjamin Allain	France				23	39.22		
24	Celia Robledo / Luis Fenero	Spain				24	38.23		
25	Victoria Bausback / Demid Rokachev	Switzerland				25	35.27		
Did not advance to short dance
26	Johanna Allik / Paul Bellantuono	Estonia		12	57.30				
27	Ekaterina Bugrov / Vasili Rogov	Israel		13	56.10				
28	Natalia Kaliszek / Michał Kaliszek	Poland		14	54.36				
29	Stephanie Baadsgaard Snider / Stepan Dubrovski	Denmark		15	54.21				
30	Szidónia Merkwart / Ádám Lukács	Hungary		16	44.68				
31	Ayesha Yigit / Shane Speden	New Zealand		17	40.53				
32	Hannah Sparke / Lochran Doherty	Australia		18	27.46				

== Medals summary ==
=== Medalists ===
Medals for overall placement:

Discipline	Gold	Silver	Bronze
Men	(China) Yan Han	(United States) Joshua Farris	(United States) Jason Brown
Ladies	(Russia) Yulia Lipnitskaya	(United States) Gracie Gold	(Russia) Adelina Sotnikova
Pair skating	(China) Sui Wenjing / Han Cong	(China) Yu Xiaoyu / Jin Yang	(Russia) Vasilisa Davankova / Andrei Deputat
Ice dancing	(Russia) Victoria Sinitsina / Ruslan Zhiganshin	(Russia) Alexandra Stepanova / Ivan Bukin	(United States) Alexandra Aldridge / Daniel Eaton

Small medals for placement in the short segment:

Discipline	Gold	Silver	Bronze
Men	(United States) Joshua Farris	(China) Yan Han	(Kazakhstan) Denis Ten
Ladies	(Russia) Yulia Lipnitskaya	(United States) Gracie Gold	(Russia) Adelina Sotnikova
Pair skating	(China) Sui Wenjing / Han Cong	(China) Yu Xiaoyu / Jin Yang	(Russia) Ekaterina Petaikina / Maxim Kurdyukov
Ice dancing	(Russia) Victoria Sinitsina / Ruslan Zhiganshin	(Russia) Alexandra Stepanova / Ivan Bukin	(Russia) Anna Yanovskaia / Sergey Mozgov

Small medals for placement in the free segment:

Discipline	Gold	Silver	Bronze
Men	(China) Yan Han	(United States) Joshua Farris	(United States) Jason Brown
Ladies	(Russia) Yulia Lipnitskaya	(United States) Gracie Gold	(Russia) Adelina Sotnikova
Pair skating	(China) Sui Wenjing / Han Cong	(China) Yu Xiaoyu / Jin Yang	(Russia) Vasilisa Davankova / Andrei Deputat
Ice dancing	(Russia) Victoria Sinitsina / Ruslan Zhiganshin	(Russia) Alexandra Stepanova / Ivan Bukin	(United States) Alexandra Aldridge / Daniel Eaton

=== By country ===
Table of medals for overall placement:

Rank	Nation	Gold	Silver	Bronze	Total
1	Russia (RUS)	2	1	2	5
2	China (CHN)	2	1	0	3
3	United States (USA)	0	2	2	4
Totals (3 entries)		4	4	4	12
