= 2011–12 Japan Figure Skating Championships =

Figure skating competition

- Type: National championship
- Date: 22–25 December 2011 (S); 25–27 November 2011 (J)
- Season: 2011–12
- Location: Kadoma, Osaka (S); Hachinohe, Aomori (J)
- Venue: Namihaya Dome (S); Technol Ice Park Niida (J)

Champions
- Men's singles: Daisuke Takahashi (S); Ryuju Hino (J)
- Ladies' singles: Mao Asada (S); Satoko Miyahara (J)
- Pairs: Narumi Takahashi / Mervin Tran (S)
- Ice dance: Bryna Oi / Taiyo Mizutani (S); Misato Komatsubara / Kaoru Tsuji (J)
- Previous: 2010–11 Japan Championships
- Next: 2012–13 Japan Championships

The 2011–12 Japan Figure Skating Championships took place on 23–26 December 2011 at the Namihaya Dome in Kadoma, Osaka. It was the 80th edition of the event. Skaters competed in the disciplines of men's singles, ladies' singles, pair skating, and ice dancing on the senior level for the title of national champion of Japan.

== Results ==
=== Men ===
Rank	Name	Club	Total points	SP		FS	
1	Daisuke Takahashi	Kansai University Skating Club	254.60	1	96.05	3	158.38
2	Takahiko Kozuka	Toyota Motor	250.97	2	85.60	2	165.37
3	Yuzuru Hanyu		241.91	4	74.32	1	167.59
4	Tatsuki Machida	Kansai University Skating Club	213.48	3	74.64	6	138.84
5	Takahito Mura		204.21	12	60.05	4	144.16
6	Daisuke Murakami	yoshindo	203.41	9	62.65	5	140.76
7	Keiji Tanaka		201.45	6	67.48	7	133.97
8	Kento Nakamura	St.Paul's	195.94	5	68.58	9	127.36
9	Shoma Uno	Grand Prix Tokai Club	190.42	7	63.49	10	126.93
10	Ryuju Hino	Chukyo Senior High School	188.30	11	60.19	8	128.11
11	Yoji Tsuboi		178.72	8	63.21	13	115.51
12	Ryuichi Kihara		178.64	13	57.45	11	121.19
13	Yukihiro Yoshida		165.82	18	49.40	12	116.42
14	Akio Sasaki	Meiji Univ	164.84	10	60.45	15	104.39
15	Yuki Horinouchi	Nihon Univ	155.33	17	49.96	14	105.37
16	Sei Kawahara		149.01	14	54.96	18	95.06
17	Takuya Kondo	Keio University	148.42	19	48.71	16	99.71
18	Yuta Onuma	Nihon Univ	147.59	16	50.82	17	96.77
19	Tomoyuki Koriyama		145.49	15	50.93	19	94.56
20	Satoshi Nakamura		134.82	20	46.75	21	88.07
21	Jo Matsumura	Meiji Univ	133.68	22	41.90	20	91.78
22	Hayato Miyazaki	Kansai University Skating Club	124.63	21	41.96	21	88.07
23	Ryoichi Eguchi		124.08	23	41.51	23	82.57
24	Yuya Tamada		115.97	24	38.99	24	76.98
Free skating not reached
25	Masaki Kondo			25	38.59		
26	Koshin Yamada	Kansai University Skating Club		26	37.60		
27	Kosuke Nozoe			27	36.34		
28	Yuuhi Matsuzaka	Kansai University Skating Club		28	34.66		
29	Shota Taketazu			29	32.80		
WD	Nobunari Oda	Kansai University Skating Club					

=== Ladies ===
The ladies' free skating attracted television ratings of 26.7% in the Tokyo and Osaka regions, and 29.9% in Nagoya, peaking at 40.0% before Asada's score was announced.

Rank	Name	Club	Total points	SP		FS	
1	Mao Asada		184.07	2	65.40	2	118.67
2	Akiko Suzuki	Howa sports land Skate Club	179.27	3	59.60	1	119.67
3	Kanako Murakami	Chukyo Senior High School	172.69	1	65.56	6	107.13
4	Haruka Imai	Nihonbashi Jogakkan	166.67	5	57.82	5	108.85
5	Miu Sato	Grand Prix Tokai Club	163.86	7	54.14	4	109.72
6	Satoko Miyahara	kansai univ.jhs.shs sc	163.85	15	47.06	3	116.79
7	Risa Shoji	Seibu Higashifushimi	156.47	11	51.50	7	104.97
8	Yuki Nishino		156.45	4	58.52	11	97.93
9	Haruna Suzuki	Shinyokohama prince club	156.23	9	53.04	8	103.19
10	Kana Muramoto		154.11	6	54.20	9	99.91
11	Kako Tomotaki		148.99	10	52.02	12	96.97
12	Satsuki Muramoto	Kansai University Skating Club	146.90	8	53.16	13	93.74
13	Miyabi Oba	Chukyo Senior High School	146.83	13	48.26	10	98.57
14	Yuka Kona		135.68	18	45.74	14	89.94
15	Shoko Ishikawa	Meiji Univ	133.66	14	47.62	16	86.04
16	Mari Suzuki	Tohoku Fukushi University	132.56	17	45.90	15	86.66
17	Shion Kokubun	Kansai University Skating Club	131.90	16	46.92	18	84.98
18	Mutsumi Takayama	Meiji Univ	130.38	12	48.48	19	81.90
19	Rina Kondo	Chukyo Senior High School	129.53	20	44.52	17	85.01
20	Sara Imamura	Chukyo Senior High School	126.22	21	44.40	20	81.82
21	Kanade Hasegawa		124.07	19	44.98	22	79.09
22	Mika Nakamura		123.81	22	43.52	21	80.29
23	Chisako Kiuchi		115.95	24	41.82	23	74.13
24	Ayane Nakamura	Chukyo Senior High School	113.89	23	42.80	24	71.09
Free skating not reached
25	Hikaru Nasuno			25	41.30		
26	Eri Seto	Kansai University Skating Club		26	40.08		
27	Mai Hirono	Chukyo Senior High School		27	38.62		
28	Ayaka Ishii	Nihon Univ		28	33.02		
29	Naomi Tanikawa	AomoriGOLD		29	29.24		

=== Pairs ===
Rank	Name	Club	Total points	SP		FS	
1	Narumi Takahashi / Mervin Tran	KINOSHITA CLUB	164.97	1	57.42	1	107.55

=== Ice dancing ===
Rank	Name	Club	Total points	SD		FD	
1	Bryna Oi / Taiyo Mizutani	Juujou FSC	114.21	1	47.02	1	67.19
2	Emi Hirai / Marien de la Asuncion	Kansai University Skating Club	106.99	2	43.08	2	63.91
3	Anna Takei / Yuya Yamada		75.16	3	28.18	3	46.98
WD	Cathy Reed / Chris Reed	KINOSHITA CLUB					

== Japan Junior Figure Skating Championships ==
The 2011–12 Junior Championships took place on 25–27 November 2011 at the Technol Ice Park Niida in Hachinohe, Aomori.

=== Men ===
Rank	Name	Club	Total points	SP		FS	
1	Ryuju Hino	Chukyo Senior High School	188.94	6	57.51	1	131.43
2	Keiji Tanaka		187.80	1	62.99	3	124.81
3	Ryuichi Kihara		187.68	2	62.14	2	125.54
4	Sei Kawahara		173.56	5	58.88	4	114.68
5	Shoma Uno	Grand Prix Tokai Club	173.46	3	61.56	5	111.90
6	Yoji Tsuboi		168.47	4	60.54	7	107.93
7	Jun Suzuki		156.02	8	47.43	6	108.59
8	Takaya Hashizume	Chukyo Senior High School	150.91	7	52.46	8	98.45
9	Kazuki Tomono	UENOSHIBA SKATE CLUB	136.51	11	43.47	9	97.63
10	Hiroaki Satou		136.51	9	46.39	12	90.12
11	Sota Yamamoto	RINKAI FIGURE SC	132.60	14	41.62	10	90.98
12	Shuu Nakamura		132.56	12	42.19	11	90.37
13	Kohei Yoshino	OSAKA SKATING CLUB	130.62	13	42.10	13	88.52
14	Kousuke Watabe		129.60	10	45.68	15	83.92
15	Kento Kajita		124.29	18	39.99	14	84.30
16	Ryoichi Yuasa	KYOTO DAIGO FSC	122.25	22	38.84	16	83.41
17	Eiki Hattori	Shumeieikou High School	119.99	16	40.62	18	79.37
18	Hidetsugu Kamata		119.60	23	38.41	17	81.19
19	Daichi Miyata		118.30	17	40.45	19	77.85
20	Masato Kimura	Hachinohe GOLD F･S･C	113.03	19	39.43	21	73.60
21	Kyohei Uetake	JYOUSAI JHS	112.93	24	38.39	20	74.54
22	Takumi Yamamoto	OSAKA SKATING CLUB	111.33	21	39.34	22	71.99
23	Taichiro Yamakuma		109.73	15	41.00	24	68.73
24	Takayuki Yamamoto		108.99	20	39.38	23	69.61
Free skating not reached
25	Hiroki Honda			25	38.32		
26	Yoji Nakano	Kanagawa FSC		26	37.77		
27	Ryuta Katada	Orion FSC		27	37.45		
28	Taichi Honda	kansai univ.jhs.shs sc		28	36.97		
29	Junya Watanabe			29	32.97		
30	Masataka Nakajima			30	31.81		

=== Ladies ===
Rank	Name	Club	Total points	SP		FS	
1	Satoko Miyahara	kansai univ.jhs.shs sc	172.17	1	56.76	1	115.41
2	Kako Tomotaki		153.42	3	52.08	3	101.34
3	Risa Shoji	Seibu Higashifushimi	151.69	7	49.30	2	102.39
4	Haruna Suzuki	Shinyokohama Prince Club	150.92	2	53.22	5	97.70
5	Miyabi Oba	Chukyo Senior High School	148.02	6	49.34	4	98.68
6	Miu Sato	Grand Prix Tokai Club	138.48	4	51.52	7	86.96
7	Hinano Isobe	RITUMEIKANUJIJr HISCHOOL	136.35	5	49.50	8	86.85
8	Mei Ito	Nihonbashi Jogakkan	136.24	8	46.22	6	90.02
9	Mayako Matsuno	Seibu Higashifushimi	128.93	9	45.22	11	83.71
10	Satomi Akuzawa	Nihonbashi Jogakkan	128.15	10	44.12	9	84.03
11	Ayana Yasuhara	SHIGA FIGURE SKATING CLUB	127.70	12	43.88	10	83.82
12	Honoka Kawanishi		122.32	14	43.12	13	79.20
13	Rin Nitaya		121.19	23	41.02	12	80.17
14	Yukiko Fujisawa		120.11	11	43.96	16	76.15
15	Miyu Nakashio		119.10	21	41.50	15	77.60
16	Sakura Yamada	Aquapia SKATING CLUB	118.67	24	41.00	14	77.67
17	Saya Ueno		118.19	18	42.54	17	75.65
18	Yuka Nagai	Seibu Higashifushimi	118.08	13	43.86	18	74.22
19	Yuka Touyama		116.39	15	43.06	20	73.33
20	Takana Ito		115.35	22	41.18	19	74.17
21	Nana Matsushima		115.16	20	41.86	21	73.30
22	Mayu Tajiri	Shinyokohama Prince Club	114.53	16	42.96	22	71.57
23	Yura Matsuda		114.14	17	42.90	23	71.24
24	Eriko Yamakuma		108.57	19	41.94	24	66.63
Free skating not reached
25	Riona Kato	KANSAI SKATING CLUB		25	40.74		
26	Mayu Kushida	Nihonbashi Jogakkan		26	40.12		
27	Misachi Fujiwara	NFSC		27	39.12		
28	Akari Katagiri	KYOTO DAIGO FSC		28	37.56		
29	Mio Suzuki	KEIO SFC SKATING CLUB		29	37.30		
30	Uruha Takahashi	SAPPORO.AURORA.FSC		30	36.62		

=== Ice dancing ===
Rank	Name	Club	Total points	SD		FD	
1	Misato Komatsubara / Kaoru Tsuji	KYOTO AQUARENA SC	73.92	1	33.04	1	40.88
