= Patricia Gleščič =

Slovenian figure skater

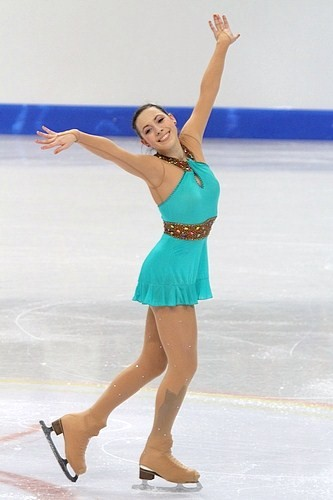
- Gleščič in 2012

Personal information
- Born: 16 July 1994 (age 31) Ljubljana, Slovenia
- Height: 1.64 m (5 ft 4 1/2 in)

Figure skating career
- Country: Slovenia
- Skating club: DKK Stanko Bloudek
- Began skating: 2001
- Retired: 2013

Patricia Gleščič (born 16 July 1994) is a Slovenian former competitive figure skater. She won bronze medals at the 2010 Golden Spin of Zagreb and 2011 Triglav Trophy, gold at the 2011 Istanbul Cup, and three Slovenian national titles. She qualified for the free skate at the 2011 and 2012 World Junior Championships.

== Career ==
=== Early career ===
Gleščič began figure skating in 2001. She competed at her first Junior Grand Prix (JGP) at the 2008 JGP Spain and finished 19th. She finished ninth at the 2009 JGP Hungary.

=== 2010–11 season ===
Gleščič began the season at the 2010 JGP Austria and finished sixth. She then won a bronze medal at the 2010 Ondrej Nepela Memorial behind Haruka Imai and Valentina Marchei. At the 2010 JGP Czech Republic, she finished 17th. Then at the 2010 Golden Spin of Zagreb, she won a bronze medal behind Sonia Lafuente and Kako Tomotaki. She won her first Slovenian national title in 2011. She advanced to the free skate at the 2011 Junior World Championships and finished 20th overall. She won another bronze medal at the 2011 Triglav Trophy behind Japanese skaters Akiko Suzuki and Kana Muramoto.

=== 2011–12 season ===
Gleščič won a gold medal at the 2011 Bosphorus Cup in Istanbul. She then successfully defended her Slovenian national title. She competed at the 2012 European Championships but did not advance past the preliminary round. Then at the 2012 Junior World Championships, she advanced to the free skate and finished 17th.

=== 2012–13 season ===
Gleščič finished 14th at the 2012 JGP Austria and 11th at the 2012 JGP Slovenia. At the 2013 European Championships, she finished 28th in the short program and did not advance to the free skate. She also finished 28th in the short program at the 2013 Junior World Championships. She also competed at the senior-level World Championships and finished 34th in the short program.

== Programs ==
Season	Short program	Free skating
2012–13	Crystallized	Inverno Porteno by Astor Piazzolla
2011–12	Romeo and Juliet Ouverture by Pyotr Ilyich Tchaikovsky	Inverno Porteno by Astor Piazzolla

== Competitive highlights ==
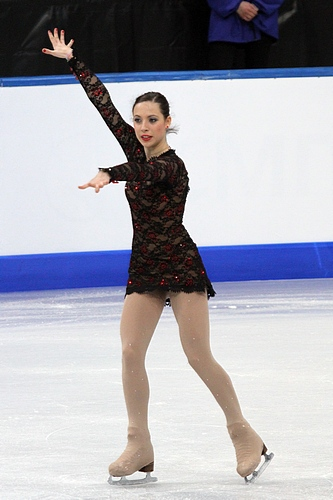
Gleščič competing at the 2012 Junior World Championships

JGP: Junior Grand Prix

International
Event	07–08	08–09	09–10	10–11	11–12	12–13
Worlds						34th
Europeans					33rd	28th
Cup of Nice						15th
Nepela Memorial				3rd		
Golden Spin				3rd	6th	4th
Ice Challenge				9th	7th	
Merano Cup				5th	5th	
Triglav Trophy				3rd		
Istanbul Cup					1st	
International: Junior
Junior Worlds				20th	17th	28th
JGP Spain		19th				
JGP Hungary			9th			
JGP Austria				6th		14th
JGP Czech Rep.				17th		
JGP Slovenia						11th
EYOF				9th		
Dragon Trophy					1st J	
National
Slovenian	3rd	4th	2nd	1st	1st	1st
J: Junior level
