= Alīna Fjodorova =

Latvian figure skater

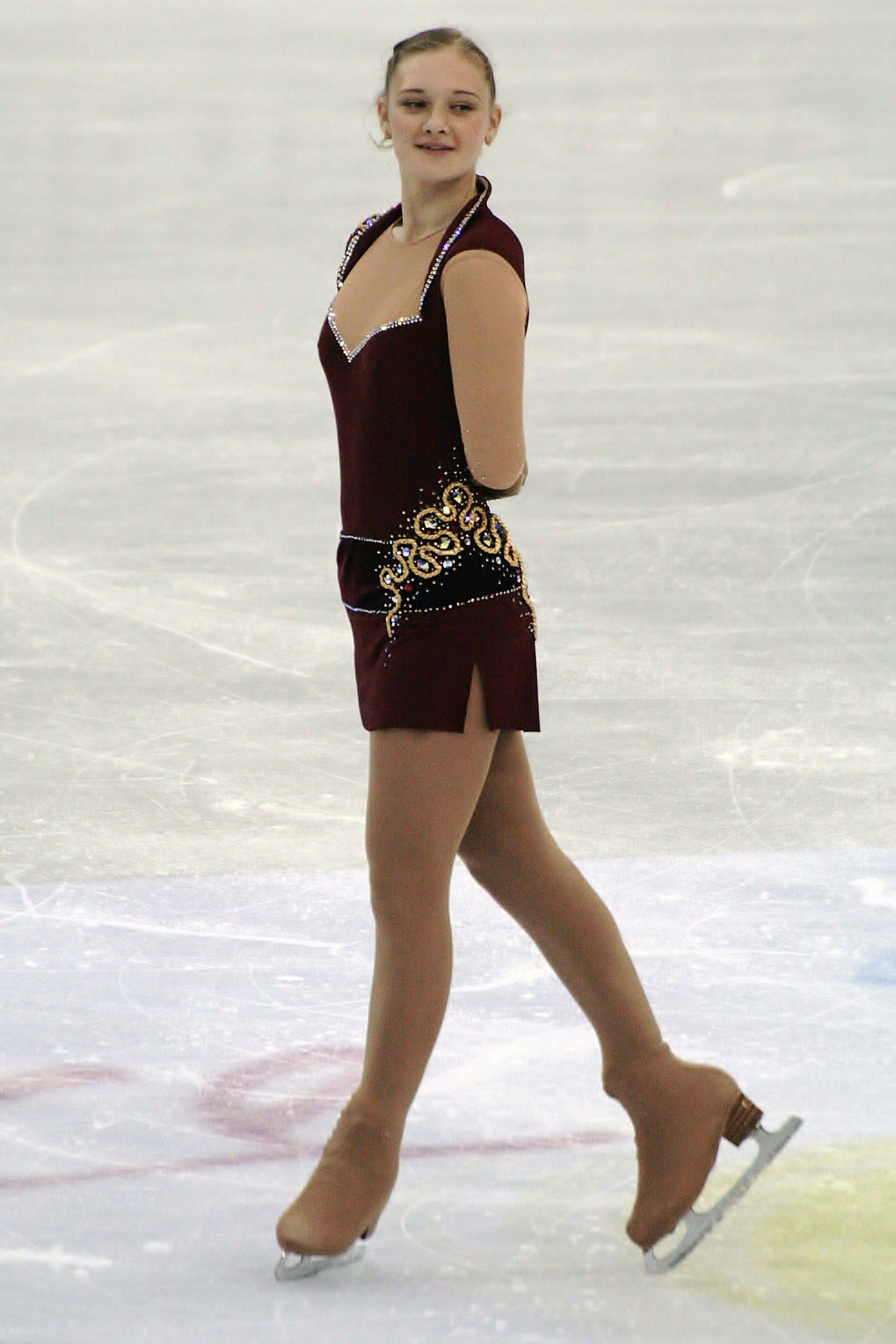
- Fjodorova in 2012

Personal information
- Born: 18 August 1995 (age 31) Riga, Latvia
- Home town: Jelgava, Latvia
- Height: 1.67 m (5 ft 5 1/2 in)

Figure skating career
- Country: Latvia
- Coach: Evgeni Rukavitsin, Andrejs Brovenko
- Skating club: Jelgava Ice School
- Began skating: 1999

Alīna Fjodorova (born 18 August 1995) is a Latvian figure skater. She is a three-time Latvian national champion and competed in the free skate at three ISU Championships – 2010 Junior Worlds in The Hague, Netherlands; 2012 Junior Worlds in Minsk, Belarus; and 2012 Europeans in Sheffield, England. In England, she ranked 18th in the short program, 14th in the free skate, and 16th overall. She finished 5th at the 2011 European Youth Olympic Winter Festival.

== Programs ==
Season	Short program	Free skating
2015–2016	Todes	
2013–2014	River Flows In You by Samuel Vallée	Requiem for a Dream by Clint Mansell; Lullaby by Brad White and Pierre Gill; 300 Violin Orchestra by Jorge Quintero
2012–2013	Inception by Hans Zimmer	Requiem for a Dream by Clint Mansell; Lullaby by Brad White and Pierre Gill; 300 Violin Orchestra by Jorge Quintero
2011–2012	Lord of the Dance by Ronan Hardiman; Breakout; Warriors	New York, New York by Fred Ebb
2010–2011	Il Leone Si E Addormentato by Henri Salvador	New York, New York by Fred Ebb

== Competitive highlights ==
JGP: Junior Grand Prix

International
Event	07–08	08–09	09–10	10–11	11–12	12–13	13–14	15–16
Worlds					27th	35th		
Europeans					16th	26th		
Bavarian Open							6th	
Ice Star								4th
Merano Cup						13th		13th
Nebelhorn Trophy							17th	
Nordics							9th	
NRW Trophy						29th		
Santa Claus Cup								17th
Toruń Cup							6th	
Ukrainian Open							11th	
Volvo Open Cup						9th		
International: Junior
Junior Worlds			24th	28th	21st			
JGP Croatia			8th					
JGP France				15th				
JGP Germany				12th				
JGP Latvia					13th		27th	
JGP Poland					9th			
JGP Slovenia						23rd		
JGP Turkey						19th		
Cup of Nice			13th J					
EYOF				5th				
National
Latvian Champ.			1st J	1st J	1st	1st	1st	2nd
J = Junior level
