= Berk Akalın =

Turkish ice dancer

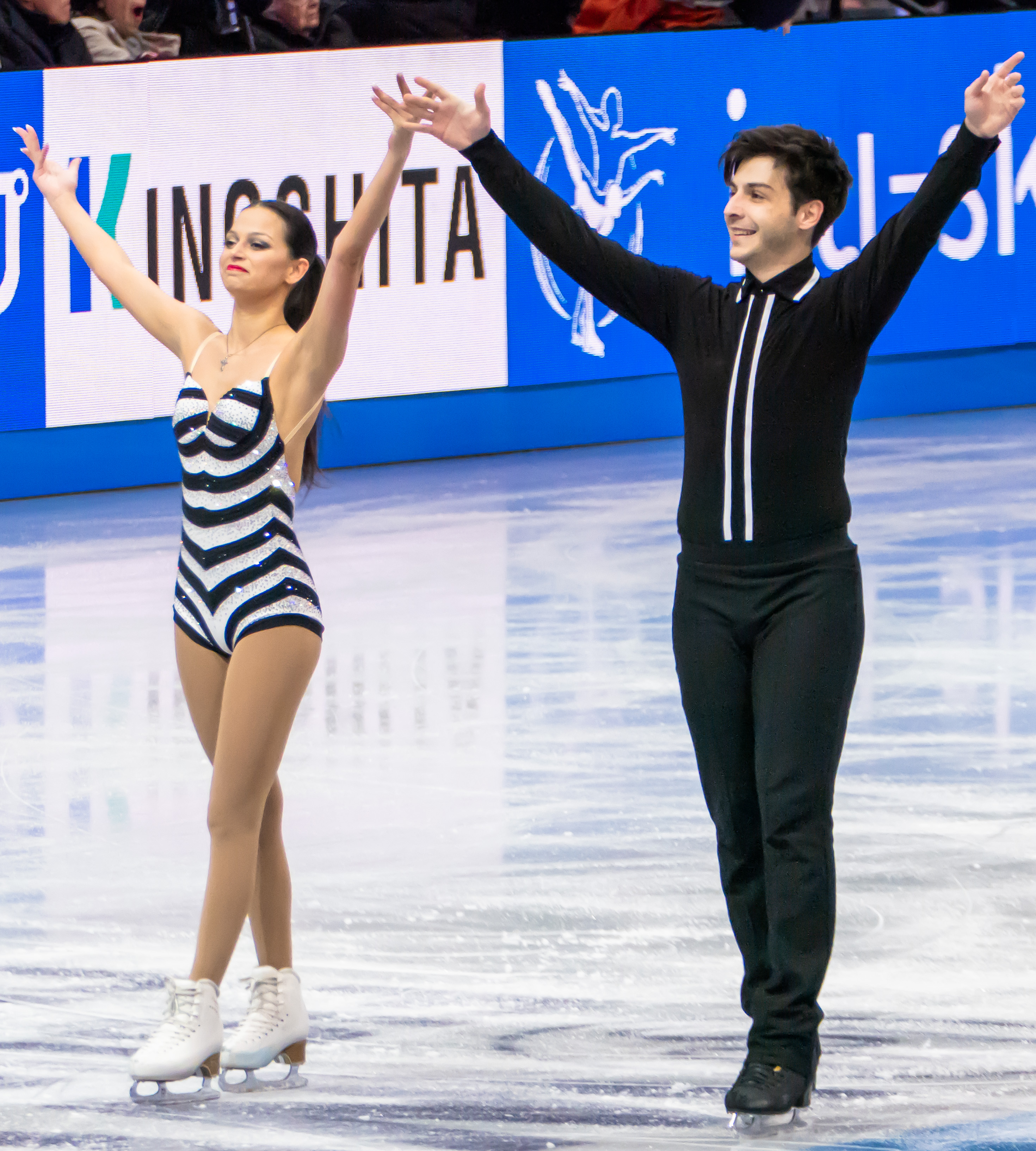
- Akalın and DelCamp at the 2025 World Championships

Personal information
- Born: January 20, 1995 (age 31) Bursa, Turkey
- Home town: Bursa, Turkey
- Height: 1.75 m (5 ft 9 in)

Figure skating career
- Country: Turkey
- Partner: Katarina DelCamp (2023–25); Yuliia Zhata (2020–22); Nicole Kelly (2018–20); Çağla Demirsal (2010–17)
- Coach: Mathew Gates
- Skating club: Bursa Tek Paten SC
- Began skating: 2002
- Retired: June 10, 2025

Berk Akalın (born January 20, 1995) is a retired Turkish ice dancer.

With wife and former ice dance partner, Katarina DelCamp, he competed at the 2025 European Championships and the 2025 World Championships. They are also the 2025 Ephesus Cup bronze medalists.

With former ice dance partner, Yuliia Zhata, he competed at the 2021 World Championships.

With former ice dance partner, Çağla Demirsal, he is the 2011 Turkish national champion and placed fourteenth at the 2013 World Junior Championships.

== Personal life ==
Akalın was born on 20 January 1995 in Bursa, Turkey.

He married his skating partner, Katarina DelCamp, on 7 December 2022 in West Palm Beach, Florida after just a three-day-long engagement. The couple married again in Ankara, Turkey on 7 December 2024.

Following his competitive retirement in 2025, Akalın began performing as a professional show skater with Royal Caribbean International, appearing in ice shows aboard cruise ships.

In 2026, Akalın was elected to the Board of Directors of the Turkish Ice Skating Federation.

== Programs ==
=== With DelCamp ===
Season	Short program	Free skating
2024–2025	You Never Can Tell by Chuck Berry; Girl, You'll Be a Woman Soon by Neil Diamond; Jungle Boogie by Kool & the Gang choreo. by Matthew Gates	Dawn of Faith by Eternal Eclipse; Newborn by Elephant Music choreo. by Matthew Gates

=== With Kelly ===
Season	Rhythm dance	Free dance
2019–2020	Foxtrot: You Are Woman, I Am Man; Quickstep: Overture (from Funny Girl) by Jule Styne performed by Barbra Streisand choreo. by Massimo Scali	The Most Evolved by John H. Clarke; Rocío de Todos los Campos by Natalia Lafourcade; Almoraima by Paco de Lucía choreo. by Massimo Scali

=== With Demirsal ===
Season	Short dance	Free dance
2014–2015	Flamenco: Paso Doble: Flamenco:	
2013–2014	Quickstep: When You Smile by Salter McDonald; Charleston: Kiss by Max Raabe	Russian folk medley
2012–2013	Blues: Why Don't You Do Right; Hip Hop: Family Affair by DJ Fede	Still Alive Piano Concerto No. 23 (modern arrangement); Andante from Piano Concerto No. 21; Still Alive Piano Concerto No. 23 (modern arrangement) by Wolfgang Amadeus Mozart
2011–2012	Rhumba; Cha Cha	Flight of the Bumble Bee
2010–2011	Waltz; Tango	Desperado

=== Single skating ===
Season	Short program	Free skating
2009–2010	The Rock by Hans Zimmer	The Survivor by Russ Landau

== Competitive highlights ==
=== Ice dance with Katarina DelCamp ===
Competition placements at senior level
Season	2024–25
World Championships	35th
European Championships	27th
Bosphorus Cup	5th
Ephesus Cup	3rd
Lake Placid IDI	18th
Mezzaluna Cup	10th

=== Ice dance with Zhata ===
International
Event	20–21	21–22
Worlds	27th	
CS Nebelhorn Trophy		14th
Egna Trophy	WD	
Lake Placid IDI		12th
LuMi Trophy	3rd	
Winter Star	5th	
TBD = Assigned; WD = Withdrew

=== Ice dance with Kelly ===
International
Event	18–19	19–20
Worlds		C
Europeans		26th
CS Ice Star		9th
CS U.S. Classic		9th
Bosphorus Cup	7th	9th
Warsaw Cup	7th	
C = Cancelled

=== Pairs with Demirsal ===
International
Event	15–16	16–17
Bavarian Open		5th
Sarajevo Open	3rd	
National
Turkish Champ.	1st	

=== Ice dance with Demirsal ===
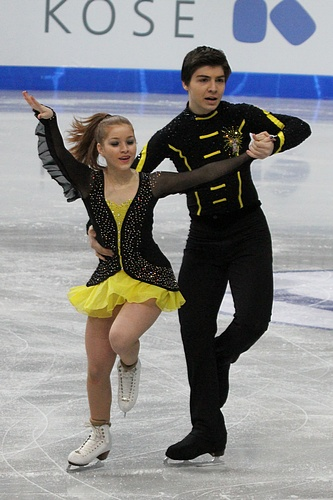
Demirsal / Akalın at the 2012 World Junior Championships

International: Junior
Event	10–11	11–12	12–13	13–14	14–15
Junior Worlds	16th PR	18th	14th	17th	
Ondrej Nepela					8th
JGP Germany			5th		
JGP Latvia		16th			
JGP Turkey			9th		
Ice Challenge			1st		
Istanbul Cup		3rd			
NRW Trophy		12th	5th		
Mont Blanc	12th				
National
Turkish Champ.	1st				
PR = Preliminary round

=== Single skating ===
International: Junior
Event	2009–10
Junior Worlds	42nd
Triglav Trophy	4th
