= Sara Aghai =

Canadian ice dancer

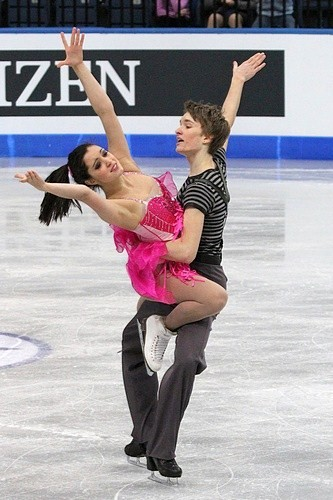

Personal information
- Full name: Sara Aghai
- Born: October 20, 1994 (age 31) New Westminster, British Columbia, Canada
- Home town: New Westminster, British Columbia, Canada

Figure skating career
- Country: Finland
- Partner: Jussiville Partanen
- Coach: Aaron Lowe; Megan Wing
- Skating club: Helsingfors Skridskoklubb
- Began skating: 1999

Sara Aghai (born October 20, 1994, in New Westminster, Canada) is a Canadian ice dancer who represented Finland with partner Jussiville Partanen. Together, they are the 2012 Finnish junior champions. They teamed up in 2011.

== Programs ==
(with Partanen)

Season	Short dance	Free dance
2012–2013	Trouble by Elvis Presley	Egyptic by Beats Antique; Feres by Natacha Atlas; Sharm-el-Sheikh by Zamalek Musicians
2011–2012	Rumba Rumba by Roni Benise; Sex Bomb by Tom Jones	Burlesque (2010 American film): Welcome to Burlesque; Far From Over by Cher; Show Me How You Burlesque by Christina Aguilera

== Competitive highlights ==
=== With Partanen for Finland ===
Results
International
Event	2011–2012	2012–2013
Junior Worlds	16th	
JGP Australia	6th	
JGP Estonia	9th	
JGP Turkey		11th
JGP USA		9th
National
Finnish Champ.	1st J.	1st J.
JGP = Junior Grand Prix; J. = Junior level

=== With Dalmer for Canada ===
Event	2010–2011
Canadian Championships	13th J.
J. = Junior level
