= Çağla Demirsal =

Turkish ice dancer (born 1995)

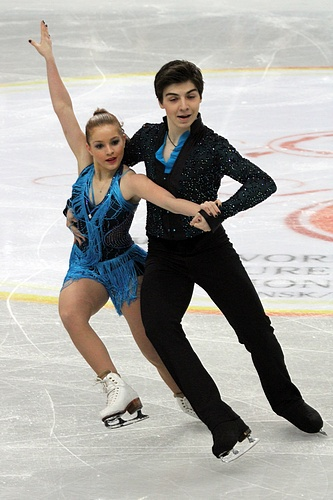
- Demirsal and Akalın in 2012

Personal information
- Born: January 23, 1995 (age 31) Kocaeli, Turkey
- Home town: Kocaeli
- Height: 1.54 m (5 ft 1/2 in)

Figure skating career
- Country: Turkey
- Partner: Berk Akalın
- Coach: Oleg Voiko
- Skating club: KBB Kagitspor
- Began skating: 2004

Çağla Demirsal (born January 23, 1995) is a Turkish ice dancer. With partner Berk Akalın, she was the 2011 Turkish national champion and placed 14th at the 2013 World Junior Championships.

== Programs ==
(with Akalın)

Season	Short dance	Free dance
2014–2015	Flamenco: Paso Doble: Flamenco:	
2013–2014	Quickstep: When You Smile by Salter McDonald; Charleston: Kiss by Max Raabe	Russian folk medley
2012–2013	Blues: Why Don't You Do Right; Hip Hop: Family Affair by DJ Fede	Still Alive Piano Concerto No. 23 (modern arrangement); Andante from Piano Concerto No. 21; Still Alive Piano Concerto No. 23 (modern arrangement) by Wolfgang Amadeus Mozart
2011–2012	Rhumba; Cha Cha	Flight of the Bumble Bee
2010–2011	Waltz; Tango	Desperado

== Competitive highlights ==
(with Akalın)

International
Event	2010–11	2011–12	2012–13	2013–14	2014–15
Junior Worlds	16th PR	18th	14th	17th	
Ondrej Nepela Trophy					8th
JGP Germany			5th		
JGP Latvia		16th			
JGP Turkey			9th		
Ice Challenge			1st J.		
Istanbul Cup		3rd J.			
NRW Trophy		12th J.	5th J.		
Mont Blanc	12th J.				
National
Turkish	1st				
JGP = Junior Grand Prix; J. = Junior level; PR = Preliminary round
