= Katarina DelCamp =

American-Turkish figure skater

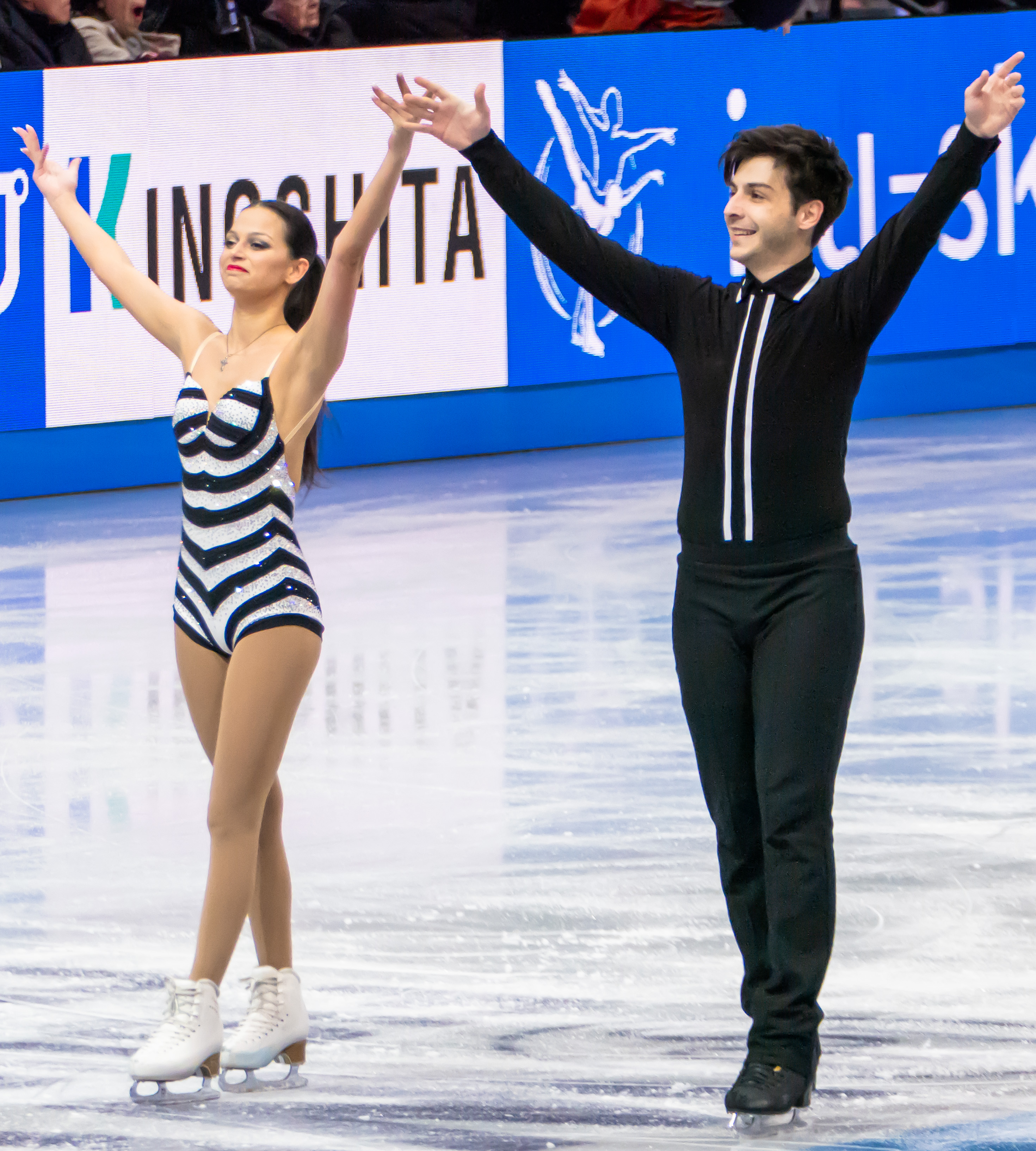
- DelCamp and Akalın at the 2025 World Championships

Personal information
- Other names: DelCamp-Akalın
- Born: 20 June 2004 (age 22) Petrozavodsk, Russia
- Home town: Charlotte, North Carolina, U.S.
- Height: 5 ft 3 in (1.60 m)

Figure skating career
- Country: Turkey; United Kingdom; United States
- Discipline: Ice dance
- Partner: Berk Akalın (2022–25); Ian Somerville (2019–2021); Maxwell Gart (2016–2019); Dylan Hylander (until 2016)
- Coach: Matthew Gates
- Began skating: 2007

Katarina DelCamp (born June 20, 2004) is an American ice dancer who currently competes for Turkey. With her husband and skating partner, Berk Akalın, she is the 2025 Ephesus Cup bronze medalist.

== Personal life ==
DelCamp was born on 20 June 2004 in Petrozavodsk, Russia. She and her twin brother, Dakota, were adopted by their parents, Debra and John, when they were five months old.

DelCamp married her skating partner, Berk Akalın, on 7 December 2022 in West Palm Beach, Florida after just a three-day-long engagement. The couple married again in Ankara, Turkey on 7 December 2024.

== Programs ==
=== With Akalın ===
Season	Short program	Free skating
2024–2025	You Never Can Tell by Chuck Berry; Girl, You'll Be a Woman Soon by Neil Diamond; Jungle Boogie by Kool & the Gang choreo. by Matthew Gates	Dawn of Faith by Eternal Eclipse; Newborn by Elephant Music choreo. by Matthew Gates

=== With Somerville ===
Season	Short program	Free skating
2020–2021	City of Stars by Ryan Gosling and Emma Stone; Planetarium (from La La Land) by Justin Hurwitz	Boogie Wonderland by Earth, Wind & Fire; How Can You Mend a Broken Heart by Bee Gees; Get Down Tonight by KC and the Sunshine Band
2019–2020	City of Stars by Ryan Gosling and Emma Stone; Planetarium (from La La Land) by Justin Hurwitz	Rewrite the Stars performed by The Piano Guys; You Are the Reason by Calum Scott choreo. by Greg Zuerlein

=== With Gart ===
Season	Short program	Free skating
2018–2019	Argentine Tango: Otra Luna by Narcotango; Tango: Libertango by Astor Piazzolla; Tango: Tango Amore by Edvin Marton choreo. by Svetlana Kulikova, Matthew Gates	Funiculì, Funiculà performed by Andre Rieu; 'O sole mio performed by Filippa Giordano; C'è la luna mezzo mare performed by Patrizio Buanne choreo. by Svetlana Kulikova, Matthew Gates
2017–2018	Sway performed by The Pussycat Dolls; Johnny's Mambo (from Dirty Dancing) by Michael Lloyd and Le Disc choreo. by Svetlana Kulikova, Matthew Gates	Try a Little Tenderness by Otis Redding; I Got You (I Feel Good) by James Brown choreo. by Svetlana Kulikova, Matthew Gates

== Competitive highlights ==
- JGP – Event of the ISU Junior Grand Prix Series
- USCS – Event of the U.S. Championship Series

=== With Akalın for Turkey ===
Competition placements at senior level
Season	2024–25
World Championships	35th
European Championships	27th
Bosphorus Cup	5th
Ephesus Cup	3rd
Lake Placid IDI	18th
Mezzaluna Cup	10th

=== With Somerville for the United States ===
Competition placements at junior level
Season	2019–20	2020–21
U.S. Championships	5th	3rd
JGP Croatia	10th	
JGP Italy	4th	
Egna Dance Trophy	2nd	
U.S. Ice Dance Final	3rd	
USCS Virtual		5th

=== With Gart for the United States ===
Competition placements at junior level
Season	2017–18	2018–19
U.S. Championships	9th	10th
JGP Slovakia		10th
Lake Placid IDI	8th	
Midwestern Sectionals	4th	4th

== Detailed results ==
=== With Akalın for Turkey ===
Results in the 2024–25 season
Date	Event	SP		FS		Total	
Date	Event	P	Score	P	Score	P	Score
28 Jan. – 2 Feb. 2025	(Estonia) 2025 European Championships	27	48.92	—N/a	—N/a	27	48.92
20–24 January 2025	(Turkey) 2025 Ephesus Cup	3	61.61	4	95.32	3	156.93
25 Nov. – 1 Dec. 2024	(Turkey) 2024 Bosphorus Cup	4	64.97	6	95.64	5	160.61
25–27 October 2024	(Italy) 2024 Mezzaluna Cup	10	57.48	10	81.61	10	139.09

=== With Somerville for the United States ===
==== Junior level ====
Results in the 2020–21 season
Date	Event	SP		FS		Total	
Date	Event	P	Score	P	Score	P	Score
11–21 January 2021	(United States) 2021 U.S. Junior Championships	3	60.26	3	87.04	3	147.30

Results in the 2019–20 season
Date	Event	SP		FS		Total	
Date	Event	P	Score	P	Score	P	Score
7–9 February 2020	(Italy) 2020 Egna Dance Trophy	1	62.72	2	93.22	2	155.94
21–26 January 2020	(United States) 2020 U.S. Junior Championships	5	60.75	5	87.84	5	148.59
12–16 November 2019	(United States) U.S. Ice Dance Final	3	60.92	4	92.90	3	153.82
2–5 October 2019	2019 JGP Italy	5	58.06	5	88.99	4	147.05
25–28 September 2019	2019 JGP Croatia	9	53.01	9	84.43	10	137.44

=== With Gart for the United States ===
==== Junior level ====
Results in the 2018–19 season
Date	Event	SP		FS		Total	
Date	Event	P	Score	P	Score	P	Score
22–27 January 2019	(United States) 2019 U.S. Junior Championships	11	48.22	10	73.30	10	121.52
15–17 November 2018	(United States) 2018 Midwestern Sectionals	4	51.51	4	76.61	4	128.12
22–25 August 2018	2018 JGP Slovakia	12	46.55	8	75.54	10	122.09

Results in the 2017–18 season
Date	Event	SP		FS		Total	
Date	Event	P	Score	P	Score	P	Score
3–6 January 2018	(United States) 2018 U.S. Junior Championships	9	50.26	10	66.39	9	116.65
15–18 November 2017	(United States) 2017 Midwestern Sectionals	4	45.65	4	55.46	4	101.11
27–29 July 2017	(United States) 2017 Lake Placid Ice Dance International	7	39.11	8	50.51	8	89.62
