= Li Meiyi =

Chinese pair skater

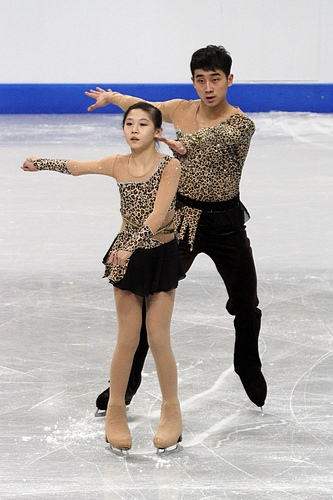

Personal information
- Born: October 27, 1997 (age 28) Qiqihar
- Home town: Qiqihar
- Height: 1.52 m (5 ft 0 in)

Figure skating career
- Country: China
- Coach: Sha Yanwei

Li Meiyi (simplified Chinese: 李美仪; traditional Chinese: 李美儀; pinyin: Lǐ Měiyí; (born in Qiqihar) is a Chinese ladies pair skater. She skates with partner Jiang Bo.

== Programs ==
(with Jiang)

Season	Short program	Free skating
2011–2013	Fantastic African Dance	Boundless from Big World

== Competitive highlights ==
Singles

Results
National
Event	2013–14	2014-15
Chinese Champ.	19th	17th

Pairs (with Jiang)

Results
International
Event	2008–09	2009–10	2010–11	2011–12	2012–13
Junior Worlds				9th	12th
JGP Austria				4th	
JGP Latvia				10th	
National
Chinese Champ.	8th		5th	7th	4th
Chinese NG	11th			9th	
JGP = Junior Grand Prix
