= Tatiana Tudvaseva =

Russian pair skater (born 1997)

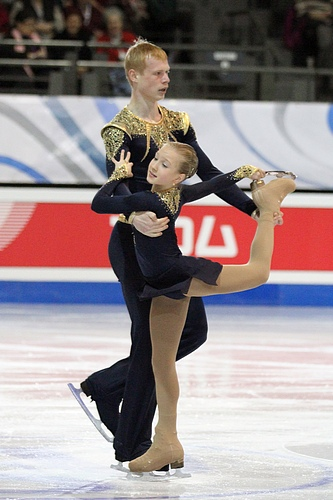

Personal information
- Full name: Tatiana Sergeyevna Tudvaseva
- Born: 3 September 1997 (age 28) Perm, Russia
- Height: 1.44 m (4 ft 8 1/2 in)

Figure skating career
- Country: Russia
- Coach: Ludmila Kalinina; Alexei Menshikov
- Began skating: 2003

Tatiana Sergeyevna Tudvaseva (Russian: Татьяна Серге́евна Тудвасева; born 3 September 1997) is a Russian pair skater. With former partner Sergei Lisiev, she qualified for the 2011–12 Junior Grand Prix Final and finished 6th. They were coached by Ludmila Kalinina and Alexei Menshikov in Saransk, after previously training in Perm region.

== Programs ==
(with Lisiev)

Season	Short program	Free skating
2012–2013		
2011–2012	Old City Quadrille	Ruslan and Ludmila by Nikolai Rimsky-Korsakov

== Competitive highlights ==
(with Lisiev)

Results
International
Event	2011–11	2011–12	2012–13
JGP Final		6th	
JGP Austria			9th
JGP Latvia		5th	
JGP Poland		3rd	
National
Russian Championships		9th	
Russian Junior Champ.	6th	5th	
JGP = Junior Grand Prix
