= Jiang Bo (figure skater) =

Chinese male pair skater (born 1992)

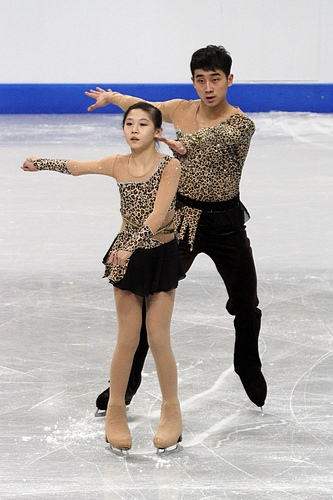

Personal information
- Born: April 21, 1992 (age 34) Qiqihar
- Home town: Qiqihar
- Height: 1.77 m (5 ft 9 1/2 in)

Figure skating career
- Country: China
- Partner: Li Meiyi
- Coach: Sha Yanwei

Jiang Bo (simplified Chinese: 蒋博; traditional Chinese: 蔣博; pinyin: Jiǎng Bó; born in Qiqihar) is a Chinese male pair skater. He skates with partner Li Meiyi.

== Programs ==
(with Li)

Season	Short program	Free skating
2011–2013	Fantastic African Dance	Boundless from Big World

== Competitive highlights ==
(with Li)

Results
International
Event	2008–09	2009–10	2010–11	2011–12	2012–13
Junior Worlds				9th	12th
JGP Austria				4th	
JGP Latvia				10th	
National
Chinese Champ.	8th		5th	7th	4th
Chinese NG	11th			9th	
JGP = Junior Grand Prix
