= Sergei Lisiev =

Russian pair skater (born 1993)

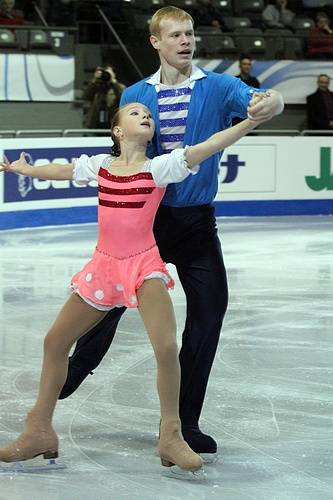

Personal information
- Full name: Sergei Olegovich Lisiev
- Born: 4 June 1993 (age 33) Novouralsk, Russia
- Height: 1.86 m (6 ft 1 in)

Figure skating career
- Country: Russia
- Partner: Ekaterina Borisova
- Coach: Ludmila Kalinina; Alexei Menshikov
- Began skating: 1996

Sergei Olegovich Lisiev (Russian: Серге́й Олегович Лисьев; born 4 June 1993) is a Russian pair skater. With former partner Tatiana Tudvaseva, he qualified for the 2011–12 Junior Grand Prix Final and finished 6th. They were coached by Ludmila Kalinina and Alexei Menshikov in Saransk, after previously training in Perm region.

== Programs ==
(with Tudvaseva)

| Season | Short program | Free skating |
|---|---|---|
| 2012–2013 | | |
| 2011–2012 | Old City Quadrille | Ruslan and Ludmila by Nikolai Rimsky-Korsakov |

== Competitive highlights ==
=== With Borisova ===
National
| Event | 2012–13 | 2013–14 |
|---|---|---|
| Russian Junior Championships | WD | 6th |

=== With Tudvaseva ===
Results
International
| Event | 2010–11 | 2011–12 | 2012–13 |
|---|---|---|---|
| JGP Final | | 6th | |
| JGP Austria | | | 9th |
| JGP Latvia | | 5th | |
| JGP Poland | | 3rd | |
National
| Russian Championships | | 9th | |
| Russian Junior Champ. | 6th | 5th | |
JGP = Junior Grand Prix
