= Víctor Bustamante =

Spanish figure skater

Personal information
- Born: 22 August 1994 (age 31) Barcelona, Spain
- Height: 1.64 m (5 ft 5 in)

Figure skating career
- Country: Spain
- Coach: Carolina Sanz, Ivan Saez, Jordi Lafarga
- Skating club: La Nevera
- Began skating: 2004

Víctor Bustamante (born 22 August 1994) is a Spanish former figure skater. He is a four-time Spanish national junior champion and has competed at three World Junior Championships.

== Programs ==
Season	Short program	Free skating
2013–2014	The Impossible by Fernando Velázquez	An American in Paris by George Gershwin
2012–2013	Danse Macabre by Camille Saint-Saëns	The Mission by Ennio Morricone
2011–2012	Vesti la giubba (from Pagliacci) by Ruggero Leoncavallo	Spartacus by Aram Khachaturian
2010–2011	Sing, Sing, Sing by Benny Goodman	Tango medley by Astor Piazzolla

== Competitive highlights ==
JGP: Junior Grand Prix

International
Event	2010–11	2011–12	2012–13	2013–14
NRW Trophy			20th	
International: Junior or novice
Junior Worlds		15th PR	18th	23rd
JGP Austria		14th		
JGP Czech Rep.				13th
JGP France	13th		12th	
JGP Germany	25th		7th	
JGP Italy		14th		
JGP Slovakia				20th
EYOF	9th J.			
Toruń Cup				2nd J.
Triglav Trophy		7th J.		
National
Spanish Champ.	1st J.	1st J.	1st J.	1st J.
