= Miu Sato =

Japanese figure skater

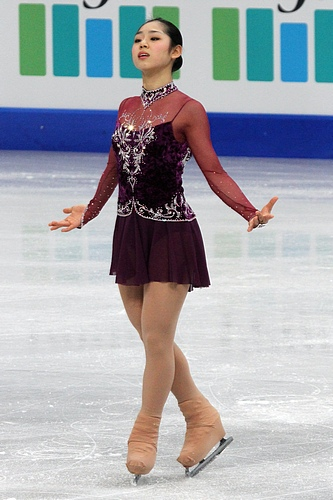

Personal information
- Born: December 13, 1996 (age 29) Nagoya, Japan
- Height: 1.55 m (5 ft 1 in)

Figure skating career
- Country: Japan
- Coach: Machiko Yamada, Mihoko Higuchi
- Skating club: Chukyo University High School
- Began skating: 2003

Miu Sato (佐藤 未生, Satō Miu; born December 13, 1996 in Nagoya) is a Japanese figure skater. She represented Japan at the 2012 World Junior Championships in Minsk, Belarus. She qualified to the free skate by placing 13th in the short program and went on to finish 12th overall.

== Programs ==
| Season | Short program | Free skating |
|---|---|---|
| 2012–2013 | Silent Jealousy by X Japan | Cinderella Sergei Prokofiev |
| 2011–2012 | Libertango by Astor Piazzolla | Piano Concerto No. 2 in C minor, op. 18 by Sergei Rachmaninoff |

== Competitive highlights ==
International
| Event | 07–08 | 08–09 | 09–10 | 10–11 | 11–12 | 12–13 |
|---|---|---|---|---|---|---|
| World Junior Champ. | | | | | 12th | |
| JGP Austria | | | | | 4th | |
| JGP Poland | | | | | 4th | |
| JGP Slovenia | | | | | | 5th |
| Asian Trophy | | 2nd N | | | | |
National
| Japan Championships | | | | | 5th | |
| Japan Junior Champ. | | 25th | | 14th | 6th | |
| Japan Novice Champ. | 3th B | 1st A | 6th A | | | |
N = Novice level; JGP = Junior Grand Prix
