= 2011–12 Grand Prix of Figure Skating Final =

2011–12 Grand Prix Final
- Type: Grand Prix
- Date: December 8 – 11, 2011
- Season: 2011–12
- Location: Quebec City, Canada
- Host: Skate Canada
- Venue: Pavillon de la Jeunesse

Champions
- Men's singles: (Canada) Patrick Chan (S) (United States) Jason Brown (J)
- Ladies' singles: (Italy) Carolina Kostner (S) (Russia) Yulia Lipnitskaya (J)
- Pairs: (Germany) Aliona Savchenko / Robin Szolkowy (S) (China) Sui Wenjing / Han Cong (J)
- Ice dance: (United States) Meryl Davis / Charlie White (S) (Russia) Victoria Sinitsina / Ruslan Zhiganshin (J)
- Previous: 2010–11 Grand Prix Final
- Next: 2012–13 Grand Prix Final
- Previous Grand Prix: 2011 Cup of Russia

The 2011–12 Grand Prix of Figure Skating Final was an international figure skating competition in the 2011–12 season. The ISU Junior Grand Prix Final was organized together with the senior event. The two competitions were the culmination of two international series, the 2011–12 ISU Grand Prix of Figure Skating for senior-level skaters and the 2011–12 ISU Junior Grand Prix for juniors.

The competitions were held in Quebec City, Canada at the Pavillon de la Jeunesse, from December 8–11, 2011. Medals were awarded in the disciplines of men's singles, ladies' singles, pair skating, and ice dancing on the senior and junior levels.

== Medalists ==
=== Senior ===
| Discipline | Gold | Silver | Bronze |
|---|---|---|---|
| Men | (Canada) Patrick Chan | (Japan) Daisuke Takahashi | (Spain) Javier Fernández |
| Ladies | (Italy) Carolina Kostner | (Japan) Akiko Suzuki | (Russia) Alena Leonova |
| Pairs | (Germany) Aliona Savchenko / Robin Szolkowy | (Russia) Tatiana Volosozhar / Maxim Trankov | (Russia) Yuko Kavaguti / Alexander Smirnov |
| Ice dancing | (United States) Meryl Davis / Charlie White | (Canada) Tessa Virtue / Scott Moir | (France) Nathalie Pechalat / Fabian Bourzat |

=== Junior ===
| Discipline | Gold | Silver | Bronze |
|---|---|---|---|
| Men | (United States) Jason Brown | (China) Yan Han | (United States) Joshua Farris |
| Ladies | (Russia) Yulia Lipnitskaya | (Russia) Polina Shelepen | (Russia) Polina Korobeynikova |
| Pairs | (China) Sui Wenjing / Han Cong | (Canada) Katherine Bobak / Ian Beharry | (United States) Britney Simpson / Matthew Blackmer |
| Ice dancing | (Russia) Victoria Sinitsina / Ruslan Zhiganshin | (Russia) Anna Yanovskaya / Sergey Mozgov | (Russia) Alexandra Stepanova / Ivan Bukin |

== Medals table ==
| Rank | Nation | Gold | Silver | Bronze | Total |
|---|---|---|---|---|---|
| 1 | Russia (RUS) | 2 | 3 | 4 | 9 |
| 2 | United States (USA) | 2 | 0 | 2 | 4 |
| 3 | Canada (CAN) | 1 | 2 | 0 | 3 |
| 4 | China (CHN) | 1 | 1 | 0 | 2 |
| 5 | Germany (GER) | 1 | 0 | 0 | 1 |
| 5 | Italy (ITA) | 1 | 0 | 0 | 1 |
| 7 | Japan (JPN) | 0 | 2 | 0 | 2 |
| 8 | France (FRA) | 0 | 0 | 1 | 1 |
| 8 | Spain (ESP) | 0 | 0 | 1 | 1 |
| Totals (9 entries) | | 8 | 8 | 8 | 24 |

== Schedule ==
(Local time, UTC/GMT -05:00):

- Thursday, December 8
  - 16:05–16:40 – Opening ceremony
  - 17:00–17:54 – Junior: Pairs' short
  - 18:15–19:01 – Junior: Ladies' short
  - 19:20–20:12 – Junior: Short dance
  - 20:35–21:21 – Junior: Men's short
- Friday, December 9
  - 11:25–12:26 – Junior: Pairs' free
  - 13:00–13:46 – Senior: Ladies' short
  - 14:05–14:57 – Senior: Short dance
  - 18:30–19:20 – Junior: Ladies' free
  - 20:00–20:54 – Senior: Pairs' short
  - 21:15–22:01 – Senior: Men's short
- Saturday, December 10
  - 14:20–15:16 – Junior: Free dance
  - 15:40–16:33 – Senior: Ladies' free
  - 16:55–17:52 – Senior: Men's free
  - 19:00–19:55 – Junior: Men's free
  - 20:15–21:20 – Senior: Pairs' free
- Sunday, December 11
  - 13:50–14:52 – Senior: Free dance
  - 16:00–18:30 – Exhibitions

== Qualifiers ==
=== Senior-level qualifiers ===
Skaters who reached the age of 14 by July 1, 2011, were eligible to compete at two senior 2011–12 Grand Prix events, including the 2011 Skate America, 2011 Skate Canada International, 2011 Cup of China, 2011 NHK Trophy, 2011 Trophée Éric Bompard, and 2011 Cup of Russia. They earned points at these events and the six highest ranking skaters/teams qualified for the senior Grand Prix Final. The following skaters qualified for the 2011–12 Grand Prix Final.

- On December 8, it was announced that Mao Asada had withdrawn due to a family emergency. There was no replacement.

| | Men | Ladies | Pairs | Ice dancing |
|---|---|---|---|---|
| 1 | (Canada) Patrick Chan | (Russia) Elizaveta Tuktamysheva | (Russia) Tatiana Volosozhar / Maxim Trankov | (United States) Meryl Davis / Charlie White |
| 2 | (Japan) Daisuke Takahashi | (Japan) Mao Asada | (Germany) Aliona Savchenko / Robin Szolkowy | (Canada) Tessa Virtue / Scott Moir |
| 3 | (United States) Jeremy Abbott | (Italy) Carolina Kostner | (Russia) Yuko Kavaguti / Alexander Smirnov | (United States) Maia Shibutani / Alex Shibutani |
| 4 | (Czech Republic) Michal Březina | (Japan) Akiko Suzuki | (China) Zhang Dan / Zhang Hao | (Russia) Ekaterina Bobrova / Dmitri Soloviev |
| 5 | (Spain) Javier Fernández | (United States) Alissa Czisny | (Japan) Narumi Takahashi / Mervin Tran | (France) Nathalie Péchalat / Fabian Bourzat |
| 6 | (Japan) Yuzuru Hanyu | (Russia) Alena Leonova | (Canada) Meagan Duhamel / Eric Radford | (Canada) Kaitlyn Weaver / Andrew Poje |
Alternates
| 1st | (China) Song Nan | (Russia) Adelina Sotnikova | (Canada) Kirsten Moore-Towers / Dylan Moscovitch | (Italy) Anna Cappellini / Luca Lanotte |
| 2nd | (Japan) Takahiko Kozuka | (United States) Mirai Nagasu | (Russia) Vera Bazarova / Yuri Larionov | (Russia) Elena Ilinykh / Nikita Katsalapov |
| 3rd | (United States) Adam Rippon | (United States) Ashley Wagner | (China) Sui Wenjing / Han Cong | (Lithuania) Isabella Tobias / Deividas Stagniūnas |

=== Junior-level qualifiers ===
Skaters who reached the age of 13 by July 1, 2011, but had not turned 19 (singles and females of the other two disciplines) or 21 (male pair skaters and ice dancers) were eligible to compete at two 2011–12 Junior Grand Prix events. They earned points at these events and the six highest ranking skaters/teams qualified for the Junior Grand Prix Final.

- On November 30, the U.S. pair team of Jessica Calalang / Zack Sidhu withdrew and were replaced by first alternates Tatiana Tudvaseva / Sergei Lisiev of Russia.

| | Men | Ladies | Pairs | Ice dancing |
|---|---|---|---|---|
| 1 | (China) Yan Han | (Russia) Yulia Lipnitskaya | (China) Sui Wenjing / Han Cong | (Russia) Victoria Sinitsina / Ruslan Zhiganshin |
| 2 | (United States) Joshua Farris | (Russia) Polina Shelepen | (China) Yu Xiaoyu / Jin Yang | (Russia) Alexandra Stepanova / Ivan Bukin |
| 3 | (United States) Jason Brown | (United States) Vanessa Lam | (United States) Britney Simpson / Matthew Blackmer | (Russia) Anna Yanovskaya / Sergey Mozgov |
| 4 | (Russia) Maxim Kovtun | (Japan) Risa Shoji | (Canada) Katherine Bobak / Ian Beharry | (Ukraine) Maria Nosulia / Evgen Kholoniuk |
| 5 | (Japan) Ryuju Hino | (China) Li Zijun | (Russia) Ekaterina Petaikina / Maxim Kurduykov | (Ukraine) Anastasia Galyeta / Alexei Shumski |
| 6 | (Japan) Keiji Tanaka | (Russia) Polina Korobeynikova | (Russia) Tatiana Tudvaseva / Sergei Lisiev | (United States) Alexandra Aldridge / Daniel Eaton |
Alternates
| 1st | (Russia) Artur Dmitriev, Jr. | (United States) Samantha Cesario | | (United States) Lauri Bonacorsi / Travis Mager |
| 2nd | (China) Zhang He | (Russia) Polina Agafonova | (Canada) Margaret Purdy / Michael Marinaro | (Russia) Valeria Zenkova / Valerie Sinitsin |
| 3rd | (South Korea) Lee June-hyoung | (Japan) Satoko Miyahara | (Czech Republic) Klára Kadlecová / Petr Bidař | (Russia) Evgenia Kosigina / Nikolai Moroshkin |

== Senior-level results ==
=== Men ===
Chan won both segments to win his second Grand Prix Final title, while Takahashi pulled up from fifth in the short to win the silver medal. Fernandez was the first Spaniard to qualify for a Grand Prix Final and also the first to win a medal at the event.

| Rank | Name | Nation | Total points | SP | | FS | |
|---|---|---|---|---|---|---|---|
| 1 | Patrick Chan | Canada | 260.30 | 1 | 86.63 | 1 | 173.67 |
| 2 | Daisuke Takahashi | Japan | 249.12 | 5 | 76.49 | 2 | 172.63 |
| 3 | Javier Fernández | Spain | 247.55 | 3 | 81.26 | 4 | 166.29 |
| 4 | Yuzuru Hanyu | Japan | 245.82 | 4 | 79.33 | 3 | 166.49 |
| 5 | Jeremy Abbott | United States | 238.82 | 2 | 82.66 | 5 | 156.16 |
| 6 | Michal Březina | Czech Republic | 218.98 | 6 | 75.26 | 6 | 143.72 |

=== Ladies ===
Kostner won the short program, with Suzuki in second and Leonova in third. Kostner also won the free skate to take the gold medal, while Suzuki and Leonova held on for silver and bronze respectively, despite Tuktamysheva placing second in the free. Kostner became the first Italian single skater to win the Grand Prix Final and is second overall after Barbara Fusar-Poli and Maurizio Margaglio, who won the ice dancing title in 2000. Mao Asada withdraw due to her mother's serious illness that led to her death.

| Rank | Name | Nation | Total points | SP | | FS | |
|---|---|---|---|---|---|---|---|
| 1 | Carolina Kostner | Italy | 187.48 | 1 | 66.43 | 1 | 121.05 |
| 2 | Akiko Suzuki | Japan | 179.76 | 2 | 61.30 | 3 | 118.46 |
| 3 | Alena Leonova | Russia | 176.42 | 3 | 60.46 | 4 | 115.96 |
| 4 | Elizaveta Tuktamysheva | Russia | 174.51 | 5 | 54.99 | 2 | 119.52 |
| 5 | Alissa Czisny | United States | 156.97 | 4 | 60.30 | 5 | 96.67 |
| WD | Mao Asada | Japan | withdrew from competition | | | | |

=== Pairs ===
The senior pairs produced the closest battle for gold, with only 0.18 points separating the top two at the end of the event. Volosozhar and Trankov placed first in the short program while Savchenko and Szolkowy were first in the free skate to win their third Grand Prix Final title.

| Rank | Name | Nation | Total points | SP | | FS | |
|---|---|---|---|---|---|---|---|
| 1 | Aliona Savchenko / Robin Szolkowy | Germany | 212.26 | 2 | 69.82 | 1 | 142.44 |
| 2 | Tatiana Volosozhar / Maxim Trankov | Russia | 212.08 | 1 | 71.57 | 2 | 140.51 |
| 3 | Yuko Kavaguti / Alexander Smirnov | Russia | 187.77 | 4 | 61.37 | 3 | 126.40 |
| 4 | Zhang Dan / Zhang Hao | China | 182.54 | 3 | 63.43 | 4 | 119.11 |
| 5 | Meagan Duhamel / Eric Radford | Canada | 170.43 | 5 | 61.04 | 5 | 109.39 |
| 6 | Narumi Takahashi / Mervin Tran | Japan | 164.42 | 6 | 59.54 | 6 | 104.88 |

=== Ice dance ===
Davis and White won their third consecutive Grand Prix Final, while Virtue and Moir won the silver and Pechalat and Bourzat the bronze. According to the initial results, Davis and White won both segments of the competition but the ISU announced on December 28 that there had been a calculation error and that Virtue and Moir had won the free dance by 0.05. The ISU explained: "The calculation program used up to and including the ISU Grand Prix of Figure Skating Final had erroneously calculated the Dance result with the previous Grade of Execution (GOE) for the Combination Lift, which was upgraded with ISU Communication 1677 in July 2011."

| Rank | Name | Nation | Total points | SD | | FD | |
|---|---|---|---|---|---|---|---|
| 1 | Meryl Davis / Charlie White | United States | 188.55 | 1 | 76.17 | 2 | 112.38 |
| 2 | Tessa Virtue / Scott Moir | Canada | 183.44 | 2 | 71.01 | 1 | 112.43 |
| 3 | Nathalie Péchalat / Fabian Bourzat | France | 169.69 | 3 | 68.68 | 3 | 101.01 |
| 4 | Kaitlyn Weaver / Andrew Poje | Canada | 166.07 | 4 | 66.24 | 4 | 99.83 |
| 5 | Maia Shibutani / Alex Shibutani | United States | 160.55 | 5 | 65.53 | 5 | 95.02 |
| 6 | Ekaterina Bobrova / Dmitri Soloviev | Russia | 157.30 | 6 | 64.05 | 6 | 93.25 |

== Junior-level results ==
=== Junior men ===
Joshua Farris won the short program, with Jason Brown in second and Yan Han in third. Brown won the gold medal after placing second in the free skate, Yan won the segment to take the silver medal, and Farris took the bronze.

| Rank | Name | Nation | Total points | SP | | FS | |
|---|---|---|---|---|---|---|---|
| 1 | Jason Brown | United States | 208.41 | 2 | 68.77 | 2 | 139.64 |
| 2 | Yan Han | China | 205.93 | 3 | 64.23 | 1 | 141.70 |
| 3 | Joshua Farris | United States | 203.98 | 1 | 72.99 | 3 | 130.99 |
| 4 | Maxim Kovtun | Russia | 193.76 | 4 | 63.68 | 4 | 130.08 |
| 5 | Ryuju Hino | Japan | 172.75 | 5 | 60.12 | 6 | 112.63 |
| 6 | Keiji Tanaka | Japan | 171.14 | 6 | 58.15 | 5 | 112.99 |

=== Junior ladies ===
Lipnitskaia won the short program, followed by Shelepen and Lam in second and third respectively. In the free skating, Lipnitskaia and Shelepen again placed first and second to win gold and silver, while Korobeynikova moved up from fifth to take the bronze medal and produce a Russian sweep.

| Rank | Name | Nation | Total points | SP | | FS | |
|---|---|---|---|---|---|---|---|
| 1 | Yulia Lipnitskaya | Russia | 179.73 | 1 | 59.98 | 1 | 119.75 |
| 2 | Polina Shelepen | Russia | 162.34 | 2 | 54.99 | 2 | 107.35 |
| 3 | Polina Korobeynikova | Russia | 151.18 | 5 | 45.24 | 3 | 105.94 |
| 4 | Li Zijun | China | 146.53 | 6 | 43.10 | 4 | 103.43 |
| 5 | Vanessa Lam | United States | 145.62 | 3 | 54.34 | 5 | 91.28 |
| 6 | Risa Shoji | Japan | 134.35 | 4 | 51.53 | 6 | 82.82 |

=== Junior pairs ===
Sui and Han won the short program and the free skate to win their second Junior Grand Prix Final title. Bobak and Beharry won the silver medal while Simpson and Blackmer took the bronze, with both couples in their first season together.

| Rank | Name | Nation | Total points | SP | | FS | |
|---|---|---|---|---|---|---|---|
| 1 | Sui Wenjing / Han Cong | China | 160.43 | 1 | 57.43 | 1 | 103.00 |
| 2 | Katherine Bobak / Ian Beharry | Canada | 152.65 | 2 | 52.77 | 2 | 99.88 |
| 3 | Britney Simpson / Matthew Blackmer | United States | 146.35 | 3 | 50.91 | 5 | 95.44 |
| 4 | Ekaterina Petaikina / Maxim Kurduykov | Russia | 146.17 | 4 | 48.75 | 4 | 97.42 |
| 5 | Yu Xiaoyu / Jin Yang | China | 144.71 | 5 | 46.83 | 3 | 97.88 |
| 6 | Tatiana Tudvaseva / Sergei Lisiev | Russia | 133.79 | 6 | 45.47 | 6 | 88.32 |

=== Junior ice dance ===
Sinitsina and Zhiganshin won the short dance over Yanovskaya and Mozgov. They then won the free dance to take the gold medal, while Stepanova and Bukin rebounded from a fall in the short dance to place second in the free but Yanovskaya and Mozgov stayed in second overall. Russia swept the podium.

| Rank | Name | Nation | Total points | SD | | FD | |
|---|---|---|---|---|---|---|---|
| 1 | Victoria Sinitsina / Ruslan Zhiganshin | Russia | 147.53 | 1 | 60.47 | 1 | 87.06 |
| 2 | Anna Yanovskaya / Sergey Mozgov | Russia | 136.61 | 2 | 56.22 | 3 | 80.39 |
| 3 | Alexandra Stepanova / Ivan Bukin | Russia | 135.17 | 4 | 52.48 | 2 | 82.69 |
| 4 | Alexandra Aldridge / Daniel Eaton | United States | 129.01 | 5 | 51.59 | 4 | 77.42 |
| 5 | Maria Nosulia / Evgeni Kholoniuk | Ukraine | 113.79 | 3 | 53.95 | 5 | 59.84 |
| DSQ | Anastasia Galyeta / Alexei Shumski | Ukraine | | | | | |
