= Ludmila Kalinina =

Russian pair skating coach

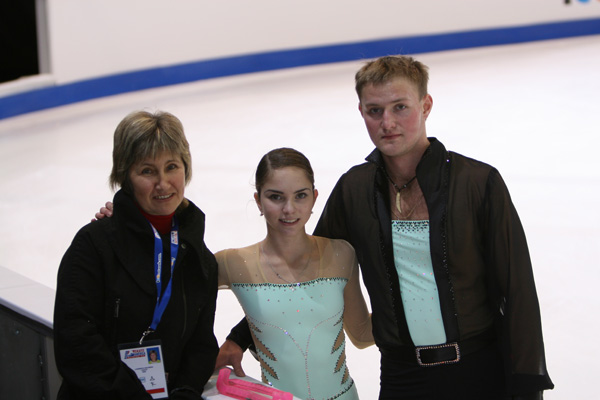
- Kalinina in 2007

Personal information
- Full name: Ludmila Alexandrovna Kalinina
- Born: Perm

Ludmila Alexandrovna Kalinina (Russian: Людмила Александровна Калинина) is a Russian pair skating coach. She was based in Perm until mid-2011 when she relocated to Saransk. Her students have included:

- Vera Bazarova / Yuri Larionov (spring 2005 to February 2013) Two-time European medalists, 2012 Grand Prix Final medalists.
- Elena Efaeva / Alexei Menshikov
- Alexei Rogonov
- Tatiana Tudvaseva / Sergei Lisiev

Kalinina has a degree in chemical engineering. She is married with two children.
