= Samuel Vallée =

French pianist and composer

Samuel Vallée (11 from Nantes) is a French pianist and composer.

== Biography ==
Of French origin, Samuel Vallée is known as an author and writer but above for his piano present albums in the French audiovisual directory (France3, Canal+, France5) and also on Internet labels like Virgin or Imeem. His best-known songs are "Another world", "Feel all around you", "Reflection on me".

He began the practice of the piano around the age of 7 years at the Reunion Island where he lives. At age 11, he went to France where he studied music in Nantes. When he enrolled in 1997 at the technical school of photography and audiovisual (ETPA) Rennes, he studied with such artists as saxophonist François Jeanneau or Jean-Pierre Ruh (cesar of French cinema).

He produced his debut on television in 1999 under the label France 3 Ouest Production, that will be heard on the documentary "Habiter la Mer (Living in the sea)," portrait of Jacques Rougerie, then at the festival of the sea in the year 2000 in Saint Malo. Spotted in 2003 by Stomp Production, a Korean label of Universal Music, he composed in the shadow more than 60 music for famous pianists Korean and Japanese of the Asian market. He then became one of the first self-taught pianists French to inspire Asian artists such as Yiruma or Dong-Min Lim... thanks to his passion for music film romantic Paris (France).

In 2007, he inaugurated in an unusual place (estate of Vaulx de Cernay, its seventh music album at the piano.

In January 2008, he produced "Love Paradox", an album that traces the various emotional components related to love. That same year, fans of Twilight (chapter I, Fascination) hoped that "a river flows in you (River Flows in You)" would be retained by the production as the Lullaby for Bella, but it is a composition of Carter Burwell has finally been chosen.

His album "A Little Touch of Jazz" published in 2009 is a retrospective of this music composed between 2000 and 2008, revisited in a personal style "Jazzo-romantic".

== Discography ==
- 1992: Element of Spirit
- 1993: Paris Newyork Paris
- 1996: Ombre et lumière (Shadow & Light)
- 1998: Requiem of ghost
- 1999: Pulsation (for France3/Canal Plus TV Documentary)
- 2003: Destiny of love
- 2004: Juste un instant (Just a moment)
- 2005: The Music that you are
- 2006: Papillon (Butterfly)
- 2007: Eveille-toi (Awake up)
- 2007: Toi (You)
- 2008: Paradoxe de l'amour (Paradox of love)
- 2008: Inese from Latvia
- 2009: A little touch of Jazz
- 2014: Some emotive notes
- 2015: Jazz injection
