= Haruna Suzuki =

Japanese figure skater

Personal information
- Born: April 9, 1997 (age 29) Yokohama, Japan
- Home town: Fujisawa, Kanagawa
- Height: 1.56 m (5 ft 1 1/2 in)

Figure skating career
- Country: Japan
- Coach: Nobuo Sato; Kumiko Sato; Reiko Kobayashi
- Skating club: Shinyokohama Prince FSC
- Began skating: 2000

Haruna Suzuki (鈴木 春奈, Suzuki Haruna; born April 9, 1997 in Yokohama) is a Japanese former figure skater. She is the 2011 Golden Spin of Zagreb silver medalist.

== Programs ==
Season	Short program	Free skating
2012–13	Serenade No 11 by W. A. Mozart	An America in Paris
2011–12	Ole Guapa	Autumn (from The Four Seasons ballet)

== Competitive highlights ==
JGP: Junior Grand Prix

International
Event	06–07	07–08	08–09	09–10	10–11	11–12	12–13	13–14	14–15	15–16
Golden Spin						2nd				
Challenge Cup						9th				
International: Junior or novice
JGP Australia						6th				
Gardena			10th N.							
National
Japan Champ.					14th	9th			18th	21st
Japan Junior					8th	4th	16th	27th		
Japan Novice	19th NB		6th NA	28th NA						
East Japan Sect.					5th J.	2nd J.	5th J.			
Kantou Regionals	4th NB	4th NB	4th NA	5th NA	1st J.	1st J.	4th J.			
Levels: NA = Novice-A; NB = Novice-B; N. = Novice; J. = Junior
