= Kako Tomotaki =

Japanese figure skater

Japanese name
- Kanji: 友滝 佳子
- Kana: ともたき かこ

Kako Tomotaki
Personal information
- Full name: Kako Tomotaki
- Born: September 12, 1995 (age 31)
- Home town: Kurashiki
- Height: 1.54 m (5 ft 1/2 in)

Figure skating career
- Country: Japan
- Skating club: Kurashiki FSC

Kako Tomotaki (友滝 佳子, Tomotaki Kako; born September 12, 1995, in Okayama, Japan) is a Japanese former figure skater. She is the 2010 Golden Spin of Zagreb silver medalist, 2011 NRW Trophy bronze medalist, and a two-time Japanese junior national silver medalist.

== Programs ==
Season	Short program	Free skating
2012–2013	Time to Say Goodbye	Amelie by Yann Tiersen
2011–2012	Time to Say Goodbye	Samson and Delilah by Camille Saint-Saëns

== Competitive highlights ==
JGP: Junior Grand Prix

International
Event	04–05	05–06	06–07	07–08	08–09	09–10	10–11	11–12	12–13	13–14	14–15
Golden Spin							2nd				
NRW Trophy								3rd			
Triglav Trophy								10th			
International: Junior
JGP Austria								7th			
JGP USA									9th		
Asian Trophy							1st J.				
National
Japan Champ.						18th	15th	11th	13th	19th	24th
Japan Junior						5th	2nd	2nd			
Japan Novice	6th B	5th B	3rd B	7th A	11th A						
West Japan Sect.						2nd J.	1st J.				
CK Regionals				1st N.	4th N.	2nd J.	1st J.				
N. = Novice-A level; J. = Junior level CK = Chushikoku and Kyushu
