= 2011–12 figure skating season =

2011–12 figure skating
- Date: July 1, 2011 – June 30, 2012
- Previous: 2010–11
- Next: 2012–13

The 2011–2012 figure skating season began on July 1, 2011, and ends on June 30, 2012. During this season, elite skaters competed on the ISU Championship level at the 2012 European, Four Continents, World Junior, and World Championships. They also competed in elite events such as the Grand Prix series and Junior Grand Prix series, culminating in the Grand Prix Final.

== Season notes ==
On September 26, 2011, American Brandon Mroz landed a quad Lutz in the short program at the 2011 Colorado Springs Invitational. The U.S. Figure Skating-sanctioned competition was a small non-ISU event with three men's entries, making it unclear whether the accomplishment would be recognized by the International Skating Union. In October, the ISU announced it had ratified the jump as the first quad Lutz to be performed in a sanctioned competition. World Champion Patrick Chan of Canada commented, "I don't think it can be an official ISU record until [Mroz] has done it in an ISU event." On November 12, Mroz landed it in the short program at 2011 NHK Trophy, becoming the first skater to land it in an international competition.

Between seasons, the ISU sometimes adjusts elements' base values and/or grades of execution. On December 28, 2011, the ISU announced it had discovered that the calculation program had not been updated with a new GOE introduced in July. The ISU explained: "The calculation program used up to and including the ISU Grand Prix of Figure Skating Final had erroneously calculated the Dance result with the previous Grade of Execution (GOE) for the Combination Lift, which was upgraded with ISU Communication 1677 in July 2011." The error affected the free dance results at the Grand Prix Final, with Tessa Virtue and Scott Moir winning the segment instead of Meryl Davis and Charlie White, however, Davis and White remained in first place overall due to their lead from the short dance.

In December 2011, the International Skating Union released details of the team figure skating event at the 2014 Winter Olympics.

=== Age eligibility ===
Skaters competing on the junior level were required to be at least 13 but not 19 – or 21 for male pair skaters and ice dancers – before July 1, 2011. Those who had turned 14 were eligible for the senior Grand Prix series and senior B internationals. Those who turned 15 before July 1, 2011 were also eligible for the senior World, European, and Four Continents Championships.

Date of birth	Eligibility
Born before July 1, 1998	Eligible for Junior Grand Prix
Born before July 1, 1997	Eligible for senior Grand Prix series, senior B internationals
Born before July 1, 1996	Eligible for senior Worlds, Europeans, Four Continents
Born before July 1, 1992	Not eligible for junior events (except male pair skaters and ice dancers)
Born before July 1, 1990	Male pair skaters and ice dancers not eligible for junior events
Rules may not apply to non-ISU events such as national championships

=== Minimum scores ===
Minimum score requirements were added to the senior Grand Prix series, following on requirements introduced in the previous season to the European, Four Continents, and World Championships. The Grand Prix minimums were set at two-thirds of the top scores at the 2011 World Championships. Prior to competing in a senior Grand Prix event, skaters were required to have earned the following:

Discipline	Minimum
Men	168.60
Ladies	117.48
Pairs	130.71
Ice dance	111.15
Skaters who had not earned the minimums in the previous season could attempt to do so at: 2011 Nebelhorn Trophy; 2011 Ondrej Nepela Memorial; 2011 Finlandia Trophy; 2011 Coupe de Nice; 2011 Ice Challenge; 2011 NRW Ice Dance Trophy.

The International Skating Union decided minimums were not required for "host picks", i.e. Canadians Adriana DeSanctis and Elladj Balde were allowed to compete at their home country's event, 2011 Skate Canada, despite failing to reach the minimums at the 2011 Nebelhorn Trophy.

== Changes ==
=== Partnership changes ===
Date	Skaters	Disc.	Type	Notes	Ref.
July 27, 2011	(Canada); Piper Gilles; Paul Poirier	Ice dance	Formed	For Canada	
August 22, 2011	(United States); Emily Samuelson; Todd Gilles	Ice dance	Formed		
September 27, 2011	(Russia); Jana Khokhlova; Fedor Andreev	Ice dance	Dissolved	Andreev retired.	
September 27, 2011	(Slovakia); Nikola Višňová; Lukáš Csölley	Ice dance	Dissolved		
October 3, 2011	(Slovakia); Federica Testa; Lukáš Csölley	Ice dance	Formed	For Slovakia	
November 2011	(Czech Republic); Lucie Myslivečková; Neil Brown	Ice dance	Formed	For the Czech Republic	
November 19, 2011	(Italy); Nicole Della Monica; Matteo Guarise	Pairs	Formed		
January 2012	(Czech Republic); Klára Kadlecová; Petr Bidař	Pairs	Dissolved	Bidař with Martina Boček	
February 2012	(Germany); Tanja Kolbe; Stefano Caruso	Ice dance	Dissolved	Teamed up again in July 2012	
February 6, 2012	(Ukraine); Anastasia Galyeta; Alexei Shumski	Ice dance	Dissolved		
February 15, 2012	(Estonia); Natalja Zabijako; Sergei Kulbach	Pairs	Dissolved		
February 24, 2012	(United States); Ashley Cain; Joshua Reagan	Pairs	Dissolved		
March 19, 2012	(Georgia (country)); Angelina Telegina; Otar Japaridze	Ice dance	Formed	Russian/Georgian team to represent Georgia.	
March 21, 2012	(Russia); Alexandra Vasilieva; Yuri Shevchuk	Pairs	Dissolved	Shevchuk with Natalia Mitina	
March 21, 2012	(Russia); Lubov Iliushechkina; Nodari Maisuradze	Pairs	Dissolved		
March 22, 2012	(United States); Caitlin Yankowskas; Joshua Reagan	Pairs	Formed		
March 2012	(Germany); Katharina Gierok; Florian Just	Pairs	Dissolved		
March 23, 2012	(United States); Kiri Baga; Taylor Toth	Pairs	Formed		
March 2012	(Ukraine); Maria Nosulia; Evgeni Kholoniuk	Ice dance	Dissolved		
March 2012	(Ukraine); Nadezhda Frolenkova; Mikhail Kasalo	Ice dance	Dissolved	Frolenkova with Vitali Nikiforov	
March 2012	(United States); Isabella Cannuscio; Ian Lorello	Ice dance	Dissolved		
March 2012	(Canada); Brittany Jones; Kurtis Gaskell	Pairs	Dissolved		
April 2012	(Canada); Katherine Bobak; Ian Beharry	Pairs	Dissolved		
April 2012	(Canada); Brittany Jones; Ian Beharry	Pairs	Formed		
April 10, 2012	(United States); Amanda Evora; Mark Ladwig	Pairs	Dissolved	Evora retired.	
April 2012	(United States); Lauri Bonacorsi; Travis Mager	Ice dance	Dissolved		
April 27, 2012	(United States); Charlotte Lichtman; Dean Copely	Ice dance	Dissolved		
April 30, 2012	(United States); Anastasia Olson; Keiffer Hubbell	Ice dance	Formed		
April 30, 2012	(Italy); Carolina Gillespie; Luca Dematté	Pairs	Dissolved		
May 4, 2012	(United States); Lindsay Davis; Mark Ladwig	Pairs	Formed		
May 6, 2012	(China); Zhang Dan; Zhang Hao	Pairs	Dissolved	Zhang Hao with Peng Cheng; Zhang Dan retired.	
May 2012	(Canada); Vanessa Crone; Nikolaj Sorensen	Ice dance	Formed	Split in June 2012	
June 2012	(United States); Emily Samuelson; Todd Gilles	Ice dance	Dissolved		
July 5, 2012	(Switzerland); Anaïs Morand; Timothy Leemann	Pairs	Dissolved		
July 23, 2012	Lubov Iliushechkina; Yannick Kocon	Pairs	Formed	Russian/French team; did not officially represent a country competitively.	

=== Coaching changes ===
Discipline	Announced	Skater(s)	From	To
Ladies	November 2011	(Canada) Cynthia Phaneuf	Annie Barabé, Sophie Richard	Brian Orser
Ice dance	December 2011	(Spain) Sara Hurtado / Adria Diaz	John Dunn	Marie-France Dubreuil, Patrice Lauzon
Ice dance	February 18, 2012	(Russia) Ksenia Monko / Kirill Khaliavin	Elena Kustarova, Svetlana Alexeeva	Alexander Zhulin, Oleg Volkov
Ice dance	January 2012	(Italy) Lorenza Alessandrini / Simone Vaturi	Roberto Pelizzola, Nicoletta Lunghi	Pasquale Camerlengo, Massimo Scali, Anjelika Krylova
Ladies	April 2012	(United States) Mirai Nagasu	Frank Carroll	Wendy Olson
Men	April 2012	(Czech Republic) Michal Březina	Petr Starec, Karel Fajfr	Viktor Petrenko
Men	April 16, 2012	(Canada) Patrick Chan	Christy Krall
Ice dance	April 25, 2012	(Russia) Ekaterina Bobrova / Dmitri Soloviev	Elena Kustarova, Svetlana Alexeeva	Alexander Zhulin, Oleg Volkov
Men	April 25, 2012	(Japan) Yuzuru Hanyu	Nanami Abe	Brian Orser
Ice dance	June 4, 2012	(United States) Meryl Davis / Charlie White (United States) Maia Shibutani / Alex Shibutani (Canada) Tessa Virtue / Scott Moir	Igor Shpilband	Continued with Marina Zueva
Ice dance	June 12, 2012	(United States) Madison Chock / Evan Bates	Marina Zueva	Continued with Igor Shpilband
Ice dance	June 14, 2012	(Lithuania) Isabella Tobias / Deividas Stagniunas	Marina Zueva	Continued with Igor Shpilband
Men	June 15, 2012	(Japan) Daisuke Takahashi	Not applicable Continued with Utako Nagamitsu as primary coach	Nikolai Morozov as advisory coach
Ice dance	June 2012	(Canada) Alexandra Paul / Mitchell Islam	David Islam, Kelly Johnson, Tyler Myles	Pasquale Camerlengo, Anjelika Krylova

=== Retirements ===
Discipline	Announced	Skater(s)
Ladies	March 25, 2012	(Finland) Laura Lepistö
Men	April 2, 2012	(Belgium) Kevin van der Perren
Men	June 15, 2012	(Italy) Samuel Contesti

== Competitions ==
The following competitions were scheduled in the 2011–2012 figure skating season.

Key

Olympics	ISU Championships	Grand Prix	Other international	Nationals

Date	Event	Type	Level	Disc.	Location	
2011
August 11–13	New Zealand Winter Games	Other inter.	Sen.–Nov.	M/L	Dunedin, New Zealand	Details
August 24–28	Asian Trophy	Other inter.	Sen.–Nov.	M/L	Dongguan, China	Details
September 1–3	JGP Volvo Cup	Grand Prix	Junior	All	Riga, Latvia	Details
September 8–10	JGP Brisbane	Grand Prix	Junior	M/L/D	Brisbane, Australia	Details
September 15–17	JGP Baltic Cup	Grand Prix	Junior	All	Gdańsk, Poland	Details
September 20–23	Chinese Championships	Nats.	Senior	All	Changchun, China	
September 21–24	Nebelhorn Trophy	Other int.	Senior	All	Oberstdorf, Germany	Details
September 22–24	JGP Brasov Cup	Grand Prix	Junior	M/L/D	Braşov, Romania	Details
Sept. 28 – Oct. 2	Ondrej Nepela Memorial	Other int.	Senior	All	Bratislava, Slovakia	Details
Sept. 29 – Oct. 1	JGP Cup of Austria	Grand Prix	Junior	All	Innsbruck, Austria	Details
October 1	Japan Open	Other int.	Senior	M/L	Saitama, Japan	Details
October 6–8	Master's de Patinage	Other dom.	Sen.–Jun.	All	Orléans, France	Details
October 6–8	JGP Trofeo Lombardi	Grand Prix	Junior	M/L/D	Milan, Italy	Details
October 6–9	Finlandia Trophy	Other int.	Senior	M/L/D	Vantaa, Finland	Details
October 13–15	JGP Tallinn Cup	Grand Prix	Junior	All	Tallinn, Estonia	Details
October 21–23	Skate America	Grand Prix	Senior	All	Ontario, United States	Details
October 26–30	Coupe de Nice	Other int.	Sen.–Nov.	All	Nice, France	Details
October 27–29	Tirnavia Ice Cup	Other int.	Jun.–PJ.	M/L	Trnava, Slovakia	Details
October 27–30	Skate Canada International	Grand Prix	Senior	All	Mississauga, Canada	Details
November 1–6	Ice Challenge	Other int.	Sen.–Nov.	All	Graz, Austria	Details
November 4–6	NRW Trophy	Other int.	Sen.–Nov.	D	Dortmund, Germany	Details
November 4–6	Cup of China	Grand Prix	Senior	All	Shanghai, China	Details
November 10–13	Skate Celje	Other int.	Jun.–PN.	M/L	Celje, Slovenia	Details
November 10–13	Crystal Skate of Romania	Other int.	Sen.–Nov.	M/L	Brașov, Romania	
November 11–13	NHK Trophy	Grand Prix	Senior	All	Sapporo, Japan	Details
November 11–16	New Zealand Championships	Nats.	Sen.–Nov.	All	Gore, New Zealand	Details
November 17–20	Warsaw Cup	Other int.	Sen.–Nov.	M/L/P	Warsaw, Poland	Details
November 18–20	Merano Cup	Other int.	Sen.–Jun.	M/L	Merano, Italy	
November 18–20	Pavel Roman Memorial	Other int.	Sen.–Nov.	D	Olomouc, Czech Republic	Details
November 18–20	Trophée Éric Bompard	Grand Prix	Senior	All	Paris, France	Details
November 21–27	British Championships	Nats.	Sen.–Nov.	All	Sheffield, United Kingdom	Details
November 24–25	Tallinn Trophy	Other int.	Sen.–PN.	M/L/D	Tallinn, Estonia	Details
November 24–26	Grand Prize SNP	Other int.	Sen.–Nov.	All	Banská Bystrica, Slovakia	Details
November 24–27	Golden Bear of Zagreb	Other int.	Jun.–Nov.	M/L/P	Zagreb, Croatia	Details
November 25–26	Belgian Championships	Nats.	Sen.–Nov.	M/L	Deurne, Belgium	Details
November 25–27	Japan Junior Championships	Nats.	Junior	M/L	Hachinohe, Japan	Details
November 25–27	Cup of Russia	Grand Prix	Senior	All	Moscow, Russia	Details
Nov. 30 – Dec. 4	NRW Trophy	Other int.	Sen.–Nov.	M/L/P	Dortmund, Germany	Details
December 1–4	Danish Championships	Nats.	Sen.–Nov.	M/L/D	Hvidovre, Denmark	Details
December 1–4	Santa Claus Cup	Other int.	Jun.–Nov.	M/L/D	Budapest, Hungary	Details
December 2–10	Australian Championships	Nats.	Sen.–Nov.	All	Brisbane, Australia	Details
December 8–10	Swiss Championships	Nats.	Senior	All	Basel, Switzerland	Details
December 8–11	Golden Spin of Zagreb	Other int.	Senior	All	Zagreb, Croatia	Details
December 8–11	Grand Prix Final	Grand Prix	Sen.–Jun.	All	Quebec City, Canada	Details
December 11–14	U.S. Junior Championships	Nats.	Juv.–Int.	All	East Lansing, United States	Details
December 14–17	Istanbul Cup	Other int.	Sen.–Jun.	M/L/D	Istanbul, Turkey	Details
December 15–18	Italian Championships	Nats.	Sen.–Jun.	All	Courmayeur, Italy	Details
December 15–18	Swedish Championships	Nats.	Sen.–Jun.	M/L/P	Malmö, Sweden	Details
December 16–17	Three Nationals Championships	Nats.	Sen.–Jun.	All	Ostrava, Czech Republic	Details
December 16–18	Austrian Championships	Nats.	Sen.–Jun.	All	Graz, Austria	Details 1, 2
December 16–18	Estonian Championships	Nats.	Senior	M/L/D	Premia, Estonia	Details
December 16–18	French Championships	Nats.	Senior	All	Dammarie-lès-Lys, France	Details
December 17–18	Dutch Championships	Nats.	Sen.–Nov.	All	Amsterdam, Netherlands	Details
December 17–18	Finnish Championships	Nats.	Sen.–Jun.	M/L/D	Tampere, Finland	Details
December 17–18	Latvian Championships	Nats.	Sen.–Nov.	M/L	Riga, Latvia	Details
December 17–18	Spanish Championships	Nats.	Sen.–Nov.	All	Jaca, Spain	Details
December 21–22	Ukrainian Championships	Nats.	Senior	All	Kyiv, Ukraine	Details
December 23–25	Japan Championships	Nats.	Senior	All	Kadoma, Japan	Details
December 25–29	Russian Championships	Nats.	Senior	All	Saransk, Russia	Details
2012
January 4–5	New Year's Cup	Other int.	Jun.–Nov.	All	Bratislava, Slovakia	Details
January 5–7	Mentor Nestle Nesquik Cup	Other int.	Sen.–Nov.	All	Toruń, Poland	Details
January 6–7	German Championships	Nats.	Senior	All	Oberstdorf, Germany	Details
January 6–8	South Korean Championships	Nats.	Sen.–Nov.	M/L	Seoul, South Korea	Details
January 6–8	International Trophy of Lyon	Other int.	Sen.–Nov.	D	Lyon, France	Details
January 11–14	Skate Helena	Other int.	Jun.–Nov.	M/L	Belgrade, Serbia	Details
January 13–15	Norwegian Championships	Nats.	Sen.–Nov.	M/L	Trondheim, Norway	Details
January 13–22	Winter Youth Olympics	Other int.	Junior	All	Innsbruck, Austria	Details
January 16–22	Canadian Championships	Nats.	Sen.–Jun.	All	Moncton, Canada	Details
January 22–29	U.S. Championships	Nats.	Sen.–Nov.	All	San Jose, United States	Details
January 23–29	European Championships	ISU Champ.	Senior	All	Sheffield, United Kingdom	Details
January 27–29	Volvo Open Cup	Other int.	Sen.–PN.	M/L/D	Riga, Latvia	Details
February 2–5	Bavarian Open	Other int.	Sen.–Nov.	All	Oberstdorf, Germany	Details
February 2–5	Dragon Trophy/Tivoli Cup	Other int.	Jun.–Nov.	M/L	Ljubljana, Slovenia	Details
February 4–5	Baltic Cup	Other int.	Jun.–Nov.	M/L/D	Gdańsk, Poland	Details
February 5–7	Russian Junior Championships	Nats.	Junior	All	Khimki, Russia	Details
February 9–12	Four Continents Championships	ISU Champ.	Senior	All	Colorado Springs, United States	Details
February 9–12	Nordic Championships	Other int.	Sen.–Nov.	M/L	Vantaa, Finland	Details
February 10	Hungarian Championships	Nats.	Sen.–Nov.	All	Budapest, Hungary	Details
February 18	Belgian Championships	Nats.	Sen.–Nov.	D	Deurne, Belgium	Details
February 24–26	French Junior Championships	Nats.	Junior	M/L/D	Charleville-Mézières, France	Details
Feb. 27 – Mar. 4	World Junior Championships	ISU Champ.	Junior	All	Minsk, Belarus	Details
March 8–11	International Challenge Cup	Other int.	Sen.–Nov.	M/L/P	The Hague, Netherlands	Details
March 16–18	Coupe du Printemps	Other int.	Sen.–Nov.	M/L	Luxembourg	Details
Mar. 26 – Apr. 1	World Championships	ISU Champ.	Senior	All	Nice, France	Details
April 4–8	Triglav Trophy	Other int.	Sen.–Nov.	M/L	Jesenice, Slovenia	Details
April 12–15	Gardena Spring Trophy	Other int.	Sen.–Nov.	M/L	Sëlva, Italy	Details
April 19–22	World Team Trophy	Other int.	Senior	All	Tokyo, Japan	Details
May 6–8	South African Championships	Nats.	Sen.–Nov.	M/L	Kempton Park, South Africa	Details

== International medalists ==
=== Men's singles ===
Championships
Competition	Gold	Silver	Bronze	Ref.
(United Kingdom) European Championships	(Russia) Evgeni Plushenko	(Russia) Artur Gachinski	(France) Florent Amodio	Details
(United States) Four Continents Championships	(Canada) Patrick Chan	(Japan) Daisuke Takahashi	(United States) Ross Miner	Details
(Belarus) World Junior Championships	(China) Yan Han	(United States) Joshua Farris	(United States) Jason Brown	Details
(France) World Championships	(Canada) Patrick Chan	(Japan) Daisuke Takahashi	(Japan) Yuzuru Hanyu	Details

Grand Prix
Competition	Gold	Silver	Bronze	Ref.
(United States) Skate America	(Czech Republic) Michal Březina	(Belgium) Kevin van der Perren	(Japan) Takahiko Kozuka	Details
Skate Canada International	(Canada) Patrick Chan	(Spain) Javier Fernández	(Japan) Daisuke Takahashi	Details
Cup of China	(United States) Jeremy Abbott	(Japan) Nobunari Oda	(China) Song Nan	Details
(Japan) NHK Trophy	(Japan) Daisuke Takahashi	(Japan) Takahiko Kozuka	(United States) Ross Miner	Details
(France) Trophée Éric Bompard	(Canada) Patrick Chan	(China) Song Nan	(Czech Republic) Michal Březina	Details
Cup of Russia	(Japan) Yuzuru Hanyu	(Spain) Javier Fernández	(United States) Jeremy Abbott	Details
(Canada) Grand Prix Final	(Canada) Patrick Chan	(Japan) Daisuke Takahashi	(Spain) Javier Fernández	Details

Junior Grand Prix
Competition	Gold	Silver	Bronze	Ref.
JGP Riga, Latvia	(Japan) Ryuju Hino	(China) Zhang He	(United States) Timothy Dolensky	Details
JGP Brisbane, Australia	(United States) Jason Brown	(Japan) Keiji Tanaka	(Canada) Liam Firus	Details
JGP Gdańsk, Poland	(United States) Joshua Farris	(Russia) Artur Dmitriev, Jr.	(Japan) Ryuichi Kihara	Details
JGP Braşov, Romania	(Russia) Maxim Kovtun	(Japan) Ryuju Hino	(Canada) Nam Nguyen	Details
JGP Innsbruck, Austria	(China) Han Yan	(Russia) Gordei Gorshkov	(Japan) Keiji Tanaka	Details
JGP Milan, Italy	(China) Han Yan	(United States) Jason Brown	(South Korea) Lee June-hyoung	Details
JGP Tallinn, Estonia	(United States) Joshua Farris	(Russia) Maxim Kovtun	(Japan) Shoma Uno	Details
JGP Final	(United States) Jason Brown	(China) Han Yan	(United States) Joshua Farris	Details

Other international competitions
Competition	Gold	Silver	Bronze	Ref.
Nebelhorn Trophy	(Japan) Yuzuru Hanyu	(Czech Republic) Michal Březina	(United States) Stephen Carriere	Details
Ondrej Nepela Memorial	(Japan) Daisuke Murakami	(Belgium) Kevin van der Perren	(Italy) Samuel Contesti	Details
Finlandia Trophy	(Japan) Takahito Mura	(United States) Douglas Razzano	(Poland) Maciej Cieplucha	Details
Coupe de Nice	(United States) Keegan Messing	(France) Chafik Besseghier	(Russia) Konstantin Menshov	Details
Ice Challenge	(United States) Stephen Carriere	(Uzbekistan) Misha Ge	(Austria) Viktor Pfeifer	Details
Merano Cup	(Japan) Daisuke Murakami	(Italy) Paolo Bacchini	(Monaco) Kim Lucine	
NRW Trophy	(Italy) Samuel Contesti	(Germany) Peter Liebers	(Japan) Kento Nakamura	Details
Golden Spin	(Japan) Tatsuki Machida	(Kazakhstan) Denis Ten	(Russia) Ivan Bariev	Details
Bavarian Open	(Germany) Franz Streubel	(Germany) Martin Rappe	(Philippines) Christopher Caluza	Details
Challenge Cup	(France) Brian Joubert	(United States) Jeremy Abbott	(Italy) Samuel Contesti	Details
Triglav Trophy	(Kazakhstan) Abzal Rakimgaliev	(Austria) Viktor Pfeifer	(France) Romain Ponsart	Details

=== Ladies ===
Championships
Competition	Gold	Silver	Bronze	Reports
Europeans	(Italy) Carolina Kostner	(Finland) Kiira Korpi	(Georgia (country)) Elene Gedevanishvili	Details
Four Continents	(United States) Ashley Wagner	(Japan) Mao Asada	(United States) Caroline Zhang	Details
Junior Worlds	(Russia) Yulia Lipnitskaya	(United States) Gracie Gold	(Russia) Adelina Sotnikova	Details
Worlds	(Italy) Carolina Kostner	(Russia) Alena Leonova	(Japan) Akiko Suzuki	Details
Grand Prix
Competition	Gold	Silver	Bronze	Reports
Skate America	(United States) Alissa Czisny	(Italy) Carolina Kostner	(Sweden) Viktoria Helgesson	Details
Skate Canada	(Russia) Elizaveta Tuktamysheva	(Japan) Akiko Suzuki	(United States) Ashley Wagner	Details
Cup of China	(Italy) Carolina Kostner	(United States) Mirai Nagasu	(Russia) Adelina Sotnikova	Details
NHK Trophy	(Japan) Akiko Suzuki	(Japan) Mao Asada	(Russia) Alena Leonova	Details
Trophée Bompard	(Russia) Elizaveta Tuktamysheva	(Italy) Carolina Kostner	(United States) Alissa Czisny	Details
Rostelecom Cup	(Japan) Mao Asada	(Russia) Alena Leonova	(Russia) Adelina Sotnikova	Details
Grand Prix Final	(Italy) Carolina Kostner	(Japan) Akiko Suzuki	(Russia) Alena Leonova	Details
Junior Grand Prix
Competition	Gold	Silver	Bronze	Reports
JGP Riga, Latvia	(Russia) Polina Shelepen	(China) Li Zijun	(Russia) Polina Agafonova	Details
JGP Brisbane, Australia	(United States) Courtney Hicks	(Japan) Risa Shoji	(United States) Vanessa Lam	Details
JGP Gdańsk, Poland	(Russia) Yulia Lipnitskaya	(Japan) Satoko Miyahara	(United States) Samantha Cesario	Details
JGP Braşov, Romania	(Russia) Polina Shelepen	(Russia) Polina Korobeynikova	(South Korea) Kim Hae-jin	Details
JGP Innsbruck, Austria	(United States) Vanessa Lam	(China) Li Zijun	(Russia) Polina Agafonova	Details
JGP Milan, Italy	(Russia) Yulia Lipnitskaya	(Russia) Anna Shershak	(United States) Hannah Miller	Details
JGP Tallinn, Estonia	(United States) Gracie Gold	(Japan) Risa Shoji	(United States) Samantha Cesario	Details
JGP Final	(Russia) Yulia Lipnitskaya	(Russia) Polina Shelepen	(Russia) Polina Korobeynikova	Details
Other internationals
Competition	Gold	Silver	Bronze	Reports
Nebelhorn Trophy	(United States) Mirai Nagasu	(Georgia (country)) Elene Gedevanishvili	(Sweden) Joshi Helgesson	Details
Ondrej Nepela Memorial	(France) Maé Bérénice Méité	(Japan) Shoko Ishikawa	(France) Léna Marrocco	Details
Finlandia Trophy	(Russia) Sofia Biryukova	(Estonia) Jelena Glebova	(Finland) Alisa Mikonsaari	Details
Coupe de Nice	(Russia) Polina Agafonova	(Ukraine) Natalia Popova	(Russia) Anna Ovcharova	Details
Ice Challenge	(United States) Caroline Zhang	(Ukraine) Natalia Popova	(Sweden) Linnea Mellgren	Details
Merano Cup	(Estonia) Jelena Glebova	(France) Lénaelle Gilleron-Gory	(Sweden) Joshi Helgesson	
NRW Trophy	(Sweden) Viktoria Helgesson	(Japan) Yuki Nishino	(Japan) Kako Tomotaki	Details
Golden Spin	(Russia) Adelina Sotnikova	(Japan) Haruna Suzuki	(Russia) Maria Artemieva	Details
Bavarian Open	(Germany) Nathalie Weinzierl	(Italy) Roberta Rodeghiero	(Sweden) Isabelle Olsson	Details
Challenge Cup	(Italy) Carolina Kostner	(Italy) Valentina Marchei	(United States) Alissa Czisny	Details
Triglav Trophy	(China) Li Zijun	(Russia) Kristina Zaseeva	(France) Lénaëlle Gilleron Gory	Details

=== Pairs ===
Championships
Competition	Gold	Silver	Bronze	Reports
Europeans	(Russia) Tatiana Volosozhar / Maxim Trankov	(Russia) Vera Bazarova / Yuri Larionov	(Russia) Ksenia Stolbova / Fedor Klimov	Details
Four Continents	(China) Sui Wenjing / Han Cong	(United States) Caydee Denney / John Coughlin	(United States) Mary Beth Marley / Rockne Brubaker	Details
Junior Worlds	(China) Sui Wenjing / Han Cong	(China) Yu Xiaoyu / Jin Yang	(Russia) Vasilisa Davankova / Andrei Deputat	Details
Worlds	(Germany) Aliona Savchenko / Robin Szolkowy	(Russia) Tatiana Volosozhar / Maxim Trankov	(Japan) Narumi Takahashi / Mervin Tran	Details
Grand Prix
Competition	Gold	Silver	Bronze	Reports
Skate America	(Germany) Aliona Savchenko / Robin Szolkowy	(China) Dan Zhang / Hao Zhang	(Canada) Kirsten Moore-Towers / Dylan Moscovitch	Details
Skate Canada	(Russia) Tatiana Volosozhar / Maxim Trankov	(China) Wenjing Sui / Cong Han	(Canada) Meagan Duhamel / Eric Radford	Details
Cup of China	(Russia) Yuko Kavaguti / Alexander Smirnov	(China) Zhang Dan / Zhang Hao	(Canada) Kirsten Moore-Towers / Dylan Moscovitch	Details
NHK Trophy	(Russia) Yuko Kavaguti / Alexander Smirnov	(Japan) Narumi Takahashi / Mervin Tran	(Germany) Aliona Savchenko / Robin Szolkowy	Details
Trophée Bompard	(Russia) Tatiana Volosozhar / Maxim Trankov	(Russia) Vera Bazarova / Yuri Larionov	(Canada) Meagan Duhamel / Eric Radford	Details
Rostelecom Cup	(Germany) Aliona Savchenko / Robin Szolkowy	(Russia) Yuko Kavaguti / Alexander Smirnov	(Italy) Stefania Berton / Ondrej Hotarek	Details
Grand Prix Final	(Germany) Aliona Savchenko / Robin Szolkowy	(Russia) Tatiana Volosozhar / Maxim Trankov	(Russia) Yuko Kavaguti / Alexander Smirnov	Details
Junior Grand Prix
Competition	Gold	Silver	Bronze	Reports
JGP Riga, Latvia	(China) Sui Wenjing / Han Cong	(China) Yu Xiaoyu / Jin Yang	(Canada) Margaret Purdy / Michael Marinaro	Details
JGP Gdańsk, Poland	(United States) Britney Simpson / Matthew Blackmer	(Canada) Katherine Bobak / Ian Beharry	(Russia) Tatiana Tudvaseva / Sergei Lisiev	Details
JGP Innsbruck, Austria	(China) Sui Wenjing / Han Cong	(China) Yu Xiaoyu / Jin Yang	(Russia) Ekaterina Petaikina / Maxim Kurduykov	Details
JGP Tallinn, Estonia	(Canada) Katherine Bobak / Ian Beharry	(United States) Britney Simpson / Matthew Blackmer	(United States) Jessica Calalang / Zack Sidhu	Details
JGP Final	(China) Sui Wenjing / Han Cong	(Canada) Katherine Bobak / Ian Beharry	(United States) Britney Simpson / Matthew Blackmer	Details
Other internationals
Competition	Gold	Silver	Bronze	Reports
Nebelhorn Trophy	(Russia) Tatiana Volosozhar / Maxim Trankov	(Russia) Vera Bazarova / Yuri Larionov	(United States) Caydee Denney / John Coughlin	Details
Ondrej Nepela Memorial	(Russia) Tatiana Volosozhar / Maxim Trankov	(Italy) Stefania Berton / Ondrej Hotarek	(Russia) Lubov Iliushechkina / Nodari Maisuradze	Details
Coupe de Nice	(Italy) Stefania Berton / Ondrej Hotarek	(Russia) Katarina Gerboldt / Alexander Enbert	(United States) Mary Beth Marley / Rockne Brubaker	Details
Ice Challenge	(United States) Andrea Poapst / Chris Knierim	(Germany) Mari Vartmann / Aaron Van Cleave	(Israel) Danielle Montalbano / Evgeni Krasnopolski	Details
NRW Trophy	(Germany) Mari Vartmann / Aaron Van Cleave	(Belarus) Lubov Bakirova / Mikalai Kamianchuk	(Estonia) Natalja Zabijako / Sergei Kulbach	Details
Golden Spin	(Russia) Anastasia Martiusheva / Alexei Rogonov	(Germany) Katharina Gierok / Florian Just	(Israel) Danielle Montalbano / Evgeni Krasnopolski	Details
Nesquik Cup	(Russia) Tatiana Novik / Andrei Novoselov	(Israel) Danielle Montalbano / Evgeni Krasnopolski	(Czech Republic) Alexandra Herbríková / Rudy Halmaert	Details
Bavarian Open	(Germany) Maylin Hausch / Daniel Wende	(Russia) Katarina Gerboldt / Alexander Enbert	(Italy) Nicole Della Monica / Matteo Guarise	Details

=== Ice dance ===
Championships
Competition	Gold	Silver	Bronze	Reports
Europeans	(France) Nathalie Péchalat / Fabian Bourzat	(Russia) Ekaterina Bobrova / Dmitri Soloviev	(Russia) Elena Ilinykh / Nikita Katsalapov	Details
Four Continents	(Canada) Tessa Virtue / Scott Moir	(United States) Meryl Davis / Charlie White	(Canada) Kaitlyn Weaver / Andrew Poje	Details
Junior Worlds	(Russia) Victoria Sinitsina / Ruslan Zhiganshin	(Russia) Alexandra Stepanova / Ivan Bukin	(United States) Alexandra Aldridge / Daniel Eaton	Details
Worlds	(Canada) Tessa Virtue / Scott Moir	(United States) Meryl Davis / Charlie White	(France) Nathalie Péchalat / Fabian Bourzat	Details
Grand Prix
Competition	Gold	Silver	Bronze	Reports
Skate America	(United States) Meryl Davis / Charlie White	(France) Nathalie Péchalat / Fabian Bourzat	(Lithuania) Isabella Tobias / Deividas Stagniunas	Details
Skate Canada	(Canada) Tessa Virtue / Scott Moir	(Canada) Kaitlyn Weaver / Andrew Poje	(Italy) Anna Cappellini / Luca Lanotte	Details
Cup of China	(Russia) Ekaterina Bobrova / Dmitri Soloviev	(United States) Maia Shibutani / Alex Shibutani	(France) Pernelle Carron / Lloyd Jones	Details
NHK Trophy	(United States) Maia Shibutani / Alex Shibutani	(Canada) Kaitlyn Weaver / Andrew Poje	(Russia) Elena Ilinykh / Nikita Katsalapov	Details
Trophée Bompard	(Canada) Tessa Virtue / Scott Moir	(France) Nathalie Péchalat / Fabian Bourzat	(Italy) Anna Cappellini / Luca Lanotte	Details
Rostelecom Cup	(United States) Meryl Davis / Charlie White	(Canada) Kaitlyn Weaver / Andrew Poje	(Russia) Ekaterina Bobrova / Dmitri Soloviev	Details
Grand Prix Final	(United States) Meryl Davis / Charlie White	(Canada) Tessa Virtue / Scott Moir	(France) Nathalie Péchalat / Fabian Bourzat	Details
Junior Grand Prix
Competition	Gold	Silver	Bronze	Reports
JGP Riga, Latvia	(Ukraine) Maria Nosulia / Evgen Kholoniuk	(Russia) Evgenia Kosigina / Nikolai Moroshkin	(United States) Alexandra Aldridge / Daniel Eaton	Details
JGP Brisbane, Australia	(Canada) Nicole Orford / Thomas Williams	(United States) Lauri Bonacorsi / Travis Mager	(Russia) Valeria Zenkova / Valerie Sinitsin	Details
JGP Gdańsk, Poland	(Russia) Victoria Sinitsina / Ruslan Zhiganshin	(Ukraine) Anastasia Galyeta / Alexei Shumski	(Russia) Anna Yanovskaia / Sergey Mozgov	Details
JGP Braşov, Romania	(Russia) Alexandra Stepanova / Ivan Bukin	(Ukraine) Anastasia Galyeta / Alexei Shumski	(Canada) Mackenzie Bent / Garrett McKeen	Details
JGP Innsbruck, Austria	(Russia) Victoria Sinitsina / Ruslan Zhiganshin	(United States) Alexandra Aldridge / Daniel Eaton	(Ukraine) Maria Nosulia / Evgen Kholoniuk	Details
JGP Milan, Italy	(Russia) Alexandra Stepanova / Ivan Bukin	(Russia) Valeria Zenkova / Valerie Sinitsin	(United States) Lauri Bonacorsi / Travis Mager	Details
JGP Tallinn, Estonia	(Russia) Anna Yanovskaia / Sergey Mozgov	(Estonia) Irina Shtork / Taavi Rand	(Russia) Evgenia Kosigina / Nikolai Moroshkin	Details
JGP Final	(Russia) Victoria Sinitsina / Ruslan Zhiganshin	(Russia) Anna Yanovskaia / Sergey Mozgov	(Russia) Alexandra Stepanova / Ivan Bukin	Details
Other internationals
Competition	Gold	Silver	Bronze	Reports
Nebelhorn Trophy	(United States) Madison Hubbell / Zachary Donohue	(Germany) Nelli Zhiganshina / Alexander Gazsi	(Canada) Kharis Ralph / Asher Hill	Details
Ondrej Nepela Memorial	(Germany) Nelli Zhiganshina / Alexander Gazsi	(Italy) Lorenza Alessandrini / Simone Vaturi	(Azerbaijan) Julia Zlobina / Alexei Sitnikov	Details
Finlandia Trophy	(Canada) Tessa Virtue / Scott Moir	(United States) Maia Shibutani / Alex Shibutani	(United States) Madison Chock / Evan Bates	Details
Coupe de Nice	(Russia) Valeria Starygina / Ivan Volobuiev	(France) Pernelle Carron / Lloyd Jones	(Spain) Sara Hurtado / Adria Diaz	Details
Ice Challenge	(United States) Lynn Kriengkrairut / Logan Giulietti-Schmitt	(United States) Isabella Cannuscio / Ian Lorello	(Ukraine) Siobhan Heekin-Canedy / Dmitri Dun	Details
NRW Trophy	(Germany) Tanja Kolbe / Stefano Caruso	(Italy) Charlene Guignard / Marco Fabbri	(Germany) Carolina Hermann / Daniel Hermann	Details
Pavel Roman Memorial	(Hungary) Zsuzsanna Nagy / Mate Fejes	(Czech Republic) Gabriela Kubová / Dmitri Kiselev	(Germany) Carolina Hermann / Daniel Hermann	Details
Golden Spin	(Germany) Nelli Zhiganshina / Alexander Gazsi	(United Kingdom) Penny Coomes / Nicholas Buckland	(Italy) Charlene Guignard / Marco Fabbri	Details
Nesquik Cup	(United Kingdom) Penny Coomes / Nicholas Buckland	(Ukraine) Siobhan Heekin-Canedy / Dmitri Dun	(Austria) Kira Geil / Tobias Eisenbauer	Details
Inter. Trophy of Lyon	(France) Tiffany Zahorski / Alexis Miart	(Austria) Barbora Silná / Juri Kurakin	(United Kingdom) Louise Walden / Owen Edwards	Details
Bavarian Open	(Italy) Charlène Guignard / Marco Fabbri	(Russia) Ekaterina Pushkash / Jonathan Guerreiro	(Czech Republic) Lucie Myslivečková / Neil Brown	Details

== Season's best scores ==
Top scores according to the ISU Season's Best standings. All scores are from ISU Championships (World, European, Four Continents, Junior World) or the Grand Prix series (both senior and junior), except for skaters who have no such assignments. In the latter case, a score from another international event may be included with an asterisk. As of April 21, 2012:

=== Men ===
Rank	Name	Country	Best: Total score	Event
1	Daisuke Takahashi	(Japan)	276.72	World Team
2	Patrick Chan	(Canada)	273.94	Four Continents
3	Evgeni Plushenko	(Russia)	261.23	Europeans
4	Yuzuru Hanyu	(Japan)	251.06	Worlds
5	Javier Fernández	(Spain)	250.33	Skate Canada
6	Artur Gachinski	(Russia)	246.27	Europeans
7	Brian Joubert	(France)	244.58	Worlds
8	Florent Amodio	(France)	243.03	Worlds
9	Michal Březina	(Czech Republic)	239.55	Worlds
10	Jeremy Abbott	(United States)	238.82	GP Final

=== Ladies ===
Rank	Name	Country	Best: Total score	Event
1	Ashley Wagner	(United States)	192.41	Four Continents
2	Carolina Kostner	(Italy)	189.94	Worlds
3	Mao Asada	(Japan)	188.62	Four Continents
4	Akiko Suzuki	(Japan)	188.62	ISU World Team Trophy
5	Yulia Lipnitskaya	(Russia)	187.05	World Junior Championships
6	Alena Leonova	(Russia)	184.28	World Championships
7	Elizaveta Tuktamysheva	(Russia)	182.89	ISU GP Trophee E. Bompard
8	Alissa Czisny	(United States)	179.15	ISU GP Trophee E. Bompard
9	Caroline Zhang	(United States)	176.18	Four Continents
10	Kanako Murakami	(Japan)	175.41	World Championships

=== Pairs ===
Rank	Name	Country	Best: Total score	Event
1	Aliona Savchenko / Robin Szolkowy	(Germany)	212.26	GP Final
2	Tatiana Volosozhar / Maxim Trankov	(Russia)	212.08	GP Final

=== Ice dance ===
Rank	Name	Country	Best: Total score	Event
1	Meryl Davis / Charlie White	(United States)	188.55	GP Final
2	Tessa Virtue / Scott Moir	(Canada)	183.34	GP Final

== World standings ==
=== Men's singles ===
As of 9 April 2012

No.	Skater	Nation
1	Patrick Chan	Canada
2	Daisuke Takahashi	Japan
3	Michal Brezina	Czech Republic
4	Yuzuru Hanyu	Japan
5	Artur Gachinski	Russia
6	Takahiko Kozuka	Japan
7	Jeremy Abbott	United States
8	Nobunari Oda	Japan
9	Florent Amodio	France
10	Tomas Verner	Czech Republic

=== Women's singles ===
As of 9 April 2012

No.	Skater	Nation
1	Carolina Kostner	Italy
2	Akiko Suzuki	Japan
3	Alena Leonova	Russia
4	Miki Ando	Japan
5	Alissa Czisny	United States
6	Kiira Korpi	Finland
7	Kanako Murakami	Japan
8	Mao Asada	Japan
9	Mirai Nagasu	United States
10	Viktoria Helgesson	Sweden

=== Pairs ===
As of 30 March 2012

No.	Skater	Nation
1	Aljona Savchenko; Robin Szolkowy	Germany
2	Tatiana Volosozhar; Maxim Trankov	Russia
3	Pang Qing; Tong Jian	China
4	Vera Bazarova; Yuri Larionov	Russia
5	Yuko Kavaguti; Alexander Smirnov	Russia
6	Sui Wenjing; Han Cong	China
7	Narumi Takahashi; Mervin Tran	Japan
8	Stefania Berton; Ondrej Hotarek	Italy
9	Meagan Duhamel; Eric Radford	Canada
10	Maylin Hausch; Daniel Wende	Germany

=== Ice dance ===
As of 31 March 2012

No.	Skater	Nation
1	Meryl Davis; Charlie White	United States
2	Nathalie Péchalat; Fabian Bourzat	France
3	Tessa Virtue; Scott Moir	Canada
4	Maia Shibutani; Alex Shibutani	United States
5	Kaitlyn Weaver; Andrew Poje	Canada
6	Ekaterina Bobrova; Dmitri Soloviev	Russia
7	Anna Cappellini; Luca Lanotte	Italy
8	Pernelle Carron; Lloyd Jones	France
9	Ekaterina Riazanova; Ilia Tkachenko	Russia
10	Elena Ilinykh; Nikita Katsalapov	Russia

== Current season's world rankings ==
=== Men's singles ===
As of 9 April 2012

No.	Skater	Nation
1	Patrick Chan	Canada
2	Yuzuru Hanyu	Japan
3	Daisuke Takahashi	Japan
4	Michal Brezina	Czech Republic
5	Jeremy Abbott	United States
6	Javier Fernandez	Spain
7	Denis Ten	Kazakhstan
8	Samuel Contesti	Italy
9	Artur Gachinski	Russia
10	Ross Miner	United States

=== Women's singles ===
As of 9 April 2012

No.	Skater	Nation
1	Carolina Kostner	Italy
2	Akiko Suzuki	Japan
3	Alena Leonova	Russia
4	Viktoria Helgesson	Sweden
5	Mao Asada	Japan
6	Ashley Wagner	United States
7	Elene Gedevanishvili	Georgia
8	Kanako Murakami	Japan
9	Adelina Sotnikova	Russia
10	Alissa Czisny	United States

=== Pairs ===
As of 30 March 2012

No.	Team	Nation
1	Tatiana Volosozhar; Maxim Trankov	Russia
2	Aljona Savchenko; Robin Szolkowy	Germany
3	Narumi Takahashi; Mervin Tran	Japan
4	Stefania Berton; Ondrej Hotarek	Italy
5	Yuko Kavaguti; Alexander Smirnov	Russia
6	Meagan Duhamel; Eric Radford	Canada
7	Vera Bazarova; Yuri Larionov	Russia
8	Sui Wenjing; Han Cong	China
9	Caydee Denney; John Coughlin	United States
10	Ksenia Stolbova; Fedor Klimov	Russia

=== Ice dance ===
As of 31 March 2012

No.	Team	Nation
1	Tessa Virtue; Scott Moir	Canada
2	Meryl Davis; Charlie White	United States
3	Nathalie Péchalat; Fabian Bourzat	France
4	Kaitlyn Weaver; Andrew Poje	Canada
5	Maia Shibutani; Alex Shibutani	United States
6	Ekaterina Bobrova; Dmitri Soloviev	Russia
7	Nelli Zhiganshina; Alexander Gazsi	Germany
8	Elena Ilinykh; Nikita Katsalapov	Russia
9	Anna Cappellini; Luca Lanotte	Italy
10	Penny Coomes; Nicholas Buckland	Great Britain
