= Vasilisa Davankova =

Russian ice dancer (born 1998)

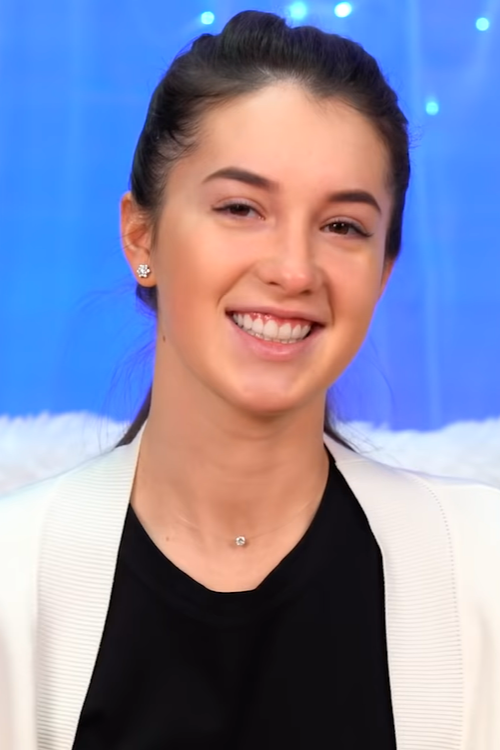
- Davankova in 2020

Personal information
- Other names: Vasilisa Davankova Morozova
- Born: 2 May 1998 (age 28) Moscow, Russia
- Height: 1.59 m (5 ft 3 in)

Figure skating career
- Country: Russia
- Coach: Nikolai Morozov
- Skating club: Vorobievie Gory Moscow
- Began skating: 2003
- Retired: 2017
Medal record
Representing Russia
Figure skating: Pairs
World Junior Championships
Bronze medal – third place	2012 Minsk	Pairs
Junior Grand Prix Final
Silver medal – second place	2012–13 Sochi	Pairs

Vasilisa Alexandrovna Davankova (Russian: Василиса Александровна Даванкова; born 2 May 1998) is a Russian YouTuber and a former ice dancer and pair skater. With former partner Andrei Deputat, she was the 2012 World Junior bronze medalist, the 2012–13 JGP Final silver medalist, and the 2012 Russian Junior champion. She then briefly teamed up with Alexander Enbert but ended their partnership in 2015.

== Personal life ==
Vasilisa Davankova was born on 2 May 1998 in Moscow. She has a younger brother, Nikita, born in 2001. She is a quarter Greek. In May 2016, Davankova married her coach Nikolai Morozov, right after she turned 18. In July 2019 during an interview, Davankova revealed that she and Morozov were divorced.

== Career ==
=== Early years ===
Davankova began skating at age seven, following her younger brother Nikita. As a singles skater, she was coached by Elena Alexandrova. Her next coaches were Alexei Ryabov and Ekaterina Ryabova. After switching to pairs, Davankova joined Sergei Dobroskokov's group and skated with Semion Kazantsev during the 2010–11 season.

=== Partnership with Deputat ===
Davankova and Ukrainian pair skater Andrei Deputat skated in the same group before teaming up in May 2011. In December 2011, they competed on the senior level at the 2012 Russian Championships. They were seventh in the short program but finished fifth overall, receiving the highest TES in the free skate ahead of the gold medalists Vera Bazarova / Yuri Larionov. In February 2012, they won the gold medal at the 2012 Russian Junior Championships after placing first in both the short and free segments. Deputat was released by Ukraine to represent Russia. Davankova/Deputat won the bronze medal in their international debut at the 2012 World Junior Championships.

In the 2012–13 season, Davankova/Deputat won silver at their first JGP event in Lake Placid, New York. At their second event, in Zagreb, Croatia, they took the bronze and qualified for the JGP Final in Sochi, Russia, where they won the silver medal behind Lina Fedorova / Maxim Miroshkin. By that time, Davankova had grown to 1.55 m. Davankova/Deputat finished seventh in their second appearance at the 2013 Russian Championships. In January 2013, Davankova injured her leg at a training session, resulting in the pair withdrawing from the 2013 Russian Junior Championships. She was on crutches for two weeks. In late March, Deputat injured his right leg and decided to undergo a meniscus operation.

In 2013–14, Davankova/Deputat began their season by winning bronze at the 2013 JGP Belarus. A silver medal at the 2013 JGP Estonia qualified them to the JGP Final in Fukuoka, Japan. At the final, Davankova/Deputat placed fifth in both segments and overall. At the Russian Championships, the pair finished fifth on the senior level and then won the bronze medal on the junior level. Davankova/Deputat were assigned to the 2014 World Junior Championships in Sofia, Bulgaria, where they finished fourth after placing third in the short program and fifth in the free skate. Their partnership ended because Deputat was struggling with elements as Davankova grew taller.

=== Partnership with Enbert ===
Davankova considered a junior-level partnership with Maxim Bobrov, skating with him for three weeks, before receiving a proposal from more experienced pair skater Alexander Enbert and coach Nina Mozer. On 30 April 2014, Mozer announced that Davankova/Enbert had teamed up and would be coached by her in Moscow. Davankova said they would begin training on 12 May. The pair performed an exhibition a few weeks later at a charity gala in Luzhniki. In 2015, it was announced that Davankova had broken up with Enbert and he will skate with a new partner, Natalia Zabiiako.

=== Partnership with Shibnev ===
In summer 2016 it became known that Davankova had decided to switch divisions from pair skating to ice dance, and would start skating with Anton Shibnev as her partner. In 2017 Shibnev started skating with a new partner.

== After skating: career on YouTube ==
After finishing her skating career, Davankova began posting content to YouTube. She is now one of the most popular Russian bloggers, with over 1 million subscribers on YouTube and almost 300,000 followers on Instagram. She calls herself 'the most fearless blogger of Russian YouTube'.

== Programs ==
=== With Shibnev ===
Season	Short dance	Free dance
2016–2017	Blues: Your Heart Is As Black As Night by Melody Gardot; Crazy in Love by Beyoncé covered by Emeli Sandé	Romeo & Juliet by Abel Korzeniowski

=== With Enbert ===
Season	Short program	Free skating	Exhibition
2014–2015	Ave Maria performed by Shirley Bassey	Doctor Zhivago Suite by Maurice Jarre	Molitva by Bi-2

=== With Deputat ===
Season	Short program	Free skating	Exhibition
2013–2014	The Godfather by Nino Rota performed by Edvin Marton choreo. by Nikolai Morozov	Notre-Dame de Paris by Riccardo Cocciante	Don't You Remember by Adele
2012–2013	The Godfather by Nino Rota performed by Edvin Marton choreo. by Nikolai Morozov	Once Upon a Time in Mexico by Robert Rodriguez choreo. by Irina Zhuk	Something's got a hold on me by Christina Aguilera
2011–2012	Flamenco by Didulia	Romeo and Juliet by Nino Rota arranged and performed by Edvin Marton	Ai se eu te pego! performed by Michel Teló

== Competitive highlights ==
GP: Grand Prix; CS: Challenger Series; JGP: Junior Grand Prix

=== Ice dance career with Shibnev ===
International
Event	2016–17
Winter Universiade	5th
National
Russian Championships	7th

=== Pair skating career with Enbert ===
International
Event	2014–15
GP Rostelecom Cup	WD
CS Autumn Classic International	6th
National
Russian Championships	6th
WD = Withdrew

=== Pair skating career with Deputat ===
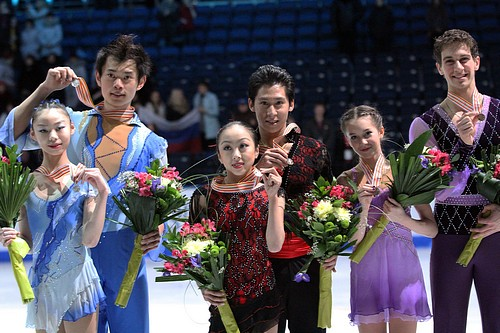
Davankova/Deputat won bronze at the 2012 World Junior Championships

International
Event	2011–12	2012–13	2013–14
Cup of Nice		4th	
International: Junior
World Junior Champ.	3rd		4th
JGP Final		2nd	5th
JGP Belarus			3rd
JGP Croatia		3rd	
JGP Estonia			2nd
JGP United States		2nd	
National
Russian Champ.	5th	7th	5th
Russian Junior Champ.	1st	WD	3rd
WD = Withdrew

== Detailed results ==
=== With Deputat ===
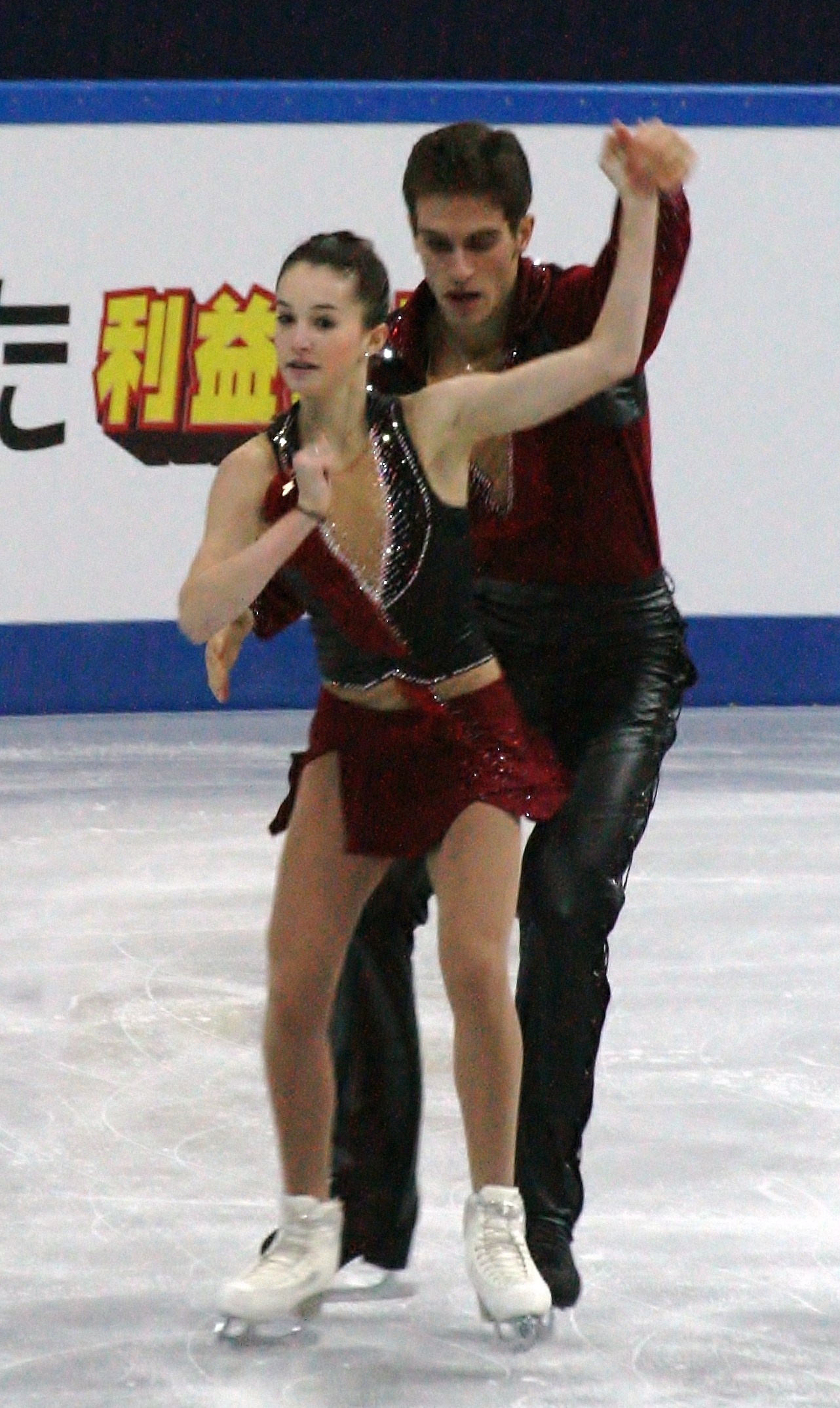
Davankova/Deputat at the 2012–13 JGP Final

2013–2014 season
Date	Event	Level	SP	FS	Total
10–16 March 2014	2014 World Junior Championships	Junior	3; 58.35	5; 92.32	4; 150.67
23–25 January 2014	2014 Russian Junior Championships	Junior	2; 63.24	3; 114.30	2; 177.54
24–27 December 2013	2014 Russian Championships	Senior	6; 62.06	6; 111.03	5; 173.09
5–8 December 2013	2013–14 JGP Final	Junior	5; 54.82	5; 96.20	5; 151.02
10–12 October 2013	2013 JGP Estonia	Junior	2; 61.48	2; 99.55	2; 161.03
26–28 September 2013	2013 JGP Belarus	Junior	2; 51.40	5; 79.06	3; 130.46
2012–2013 season
Date	Event	Level	SP	FS	Total
25–28 December 2012	2013 Russian Championships	Senior	4; 58.30	9; 103.46	7; 161.76
6–9 December 2012	2012–13 JGP Final	Junior	3; 51.34	2; 104.62	2; 155.96
24–28 October 2012	2012 Coupe de Nice	Senior	2; 50.38	4; 75.16	4; 125.54
4–7 October 2012	2012 JGP Croatia	Junior	2; 50.42	3; 93.20	3; 143.62
30 Aug. – 1 Sept. 2012	2012 JGP USA	Junior	1; 48.97	3; 84.14	2; 133.11
2011–2012 season
Date	Event	Level	SP	FS	Total
27 Feb. – 4 March 2012	2012 World Junior Championships	Junior	5; 50.50	3; 103.16	3; 153.66
5–7 February 2012	2012 Russian Junior Championships	Junior	1; 55.06	1; 114.77	1; 169.83
25–29 December 2011	2012 Russian Championships	Senior	7; 53.32	5; 115.47	5; 168.79
