= 2012 Russian Figure Skating Championships =

- Type: National Championship
- Date: 25–29 December 2011 (S); 5–7 February 2012 (J)
- Season: 2011–12
- Location: Saransk (S) / Khimki (J)
- Host: Figure Skating Federation of Russia
- Venue: Ice Palace (S)

Champions
- Men's singles: Evgeni Plushenko (S); Zhan Bush (J)
- Ladies' singles: Adelina Sotnikova (S); Yulia Lipnitskaya (J)
- Pairs: Vera Bazarova / Yuri Larionov (S); Vasilisa Davankova / Andrei Deputat (J)
- Ice dance: Ekaterina Bobrova / Dmitri Soloviev (S); Victoria Sinitsina / Ruslan Zhiganshin (J)
- Previous: 2011 Russian Championships
- Next: 2013 Russian Championships

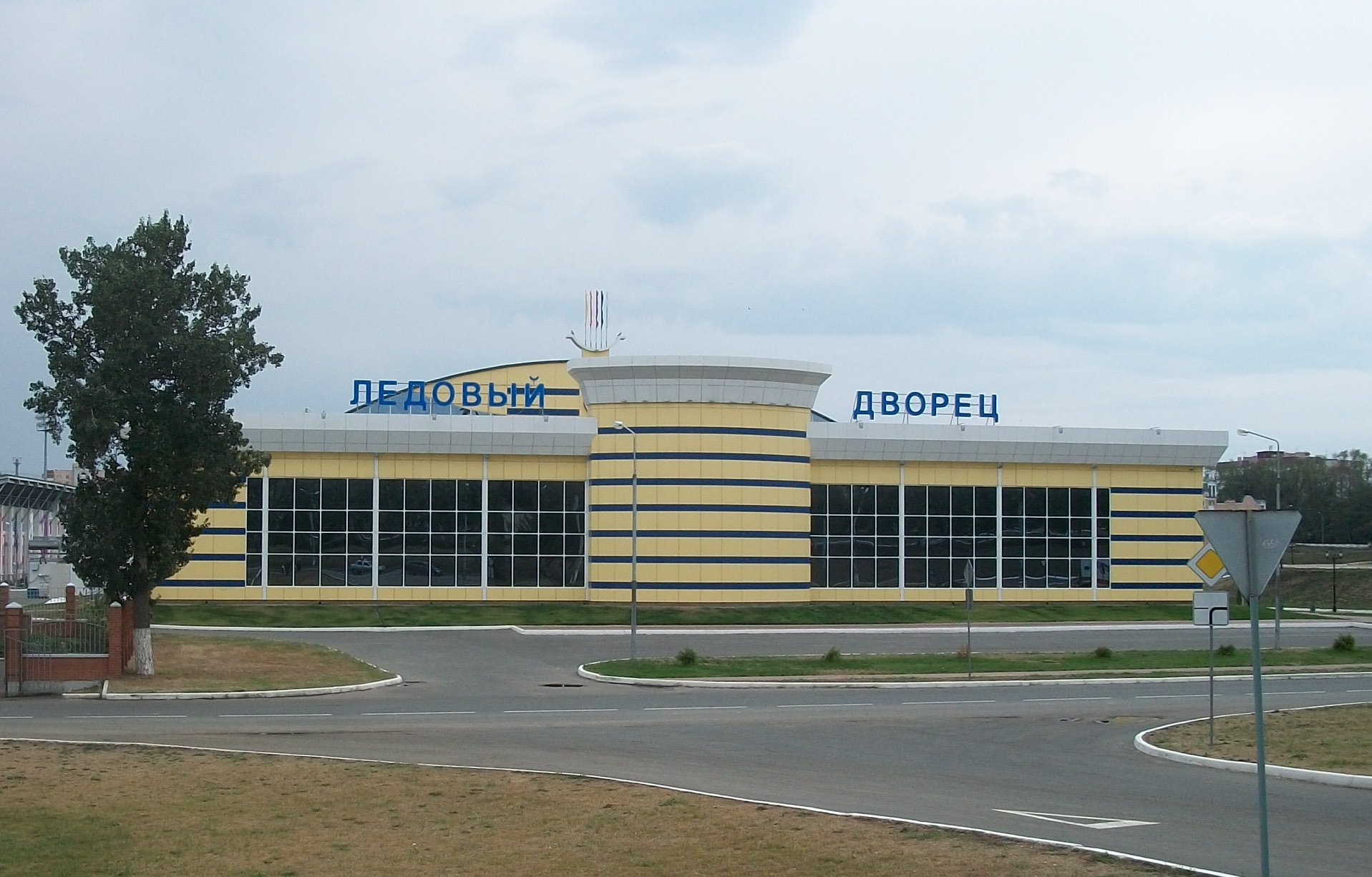
The Ice Palace of Mordovia Republic (Saransk, Russia)

The 2012 Russian Figure Skating Championships (Russian: Чемпионат России по фигурному катанию на коньках 2012) was held from December 25–29, 2011 in Saransk. Skaters competed in the disciplines of men's singles, ladies' singles, pair skating, and ice dancing.

The results were among the criteria used to select the teams sent to the 2012 World Championships, the 2012 European Championships, and the 2012 World Junior Championships.

== Competitions ==
| Date | Event | Type | Location |
|---|---|---|---|
| 24–28 December 2011 | 2012 Russian Championships | Final | Saransk, Mordovia |
| 4–7 February 2012 | 2012 Russian Junior Championships | Final | Khimki, Moscow Oblast |
| 21–25 February 2012 | 2012 Russian Cup Final | Final | Stary Oskol, Belgorod Oblast |
| 13–17 March 2012 | 2012 Russian Youth Championships – Younger Age | Final | Tver, Tver Oblast |
| 28–31 March 2012 | 2012 Russian Youth Championships – Elder Age | Final | Nizhny Novgorod, Nizhny Novgorod Oblast |

== Medalists of most important competitions ==
Senior Championships
| Discipline | Gold | Silver | Bronze |
|---|---|---|---|
| Men | Evgeni Plushenko | Artur Gachinski | Sergei Voronov |
| Ladies | Adelina Sotnikova | Yulia Lipnitskaya | Alena Leonova |
| Pairs | Vera Bazarova / Yuri Larionov | Ksenia Stolbova / Fedor Klimov | Anastasia Martiusheva / Alexei Rogonov |
| Ice dancing | Ekaterina Bobrova / Dmitri Soloviev | Elena Ilinykh / Nikita Katsalapov | Ekaterina Riazanova / Ilia Tkachenko |
Junior Championships
| Discipline | Gold | Silver | Bronze |
| Men | Zhan Bush | Artur Dmitriev Jr. | Maxim Kovtun |
| Ladies | Yulia Lipnitskaya | Polina Shelepen | Elena Radionova |
| Pairs | Vasilisa Davankova / Andrei Deputat | Ekaterina Petaikina / Maxim Kurdyukov | Kamilla Gainetdinova / Ivan Bich |
| Ice dancing | Victoria Sinitsina / Ruslan Zhiganshin | Alexandra Stepanova / Ivan Bukin | Valeria Zenkova / Valerie Sinitsin |
Cup Final
| Discipline | Gold | Silver | Bronze |
| Men | Konstantin Menshov | Vladislav Sezganov | Gordei Gorshkov |
| Ladies | Elena Radionova | Anna Shershak | Maria Artemieva |
| Pairs | Katarina Gerboldt / Alexander Enbert | Evgenia Tarasova / Egor Chudin | Maria Vigalova / Egor Zakroev |
| Ice dancing | Valeria Starygina / Ivan Volobuiev | Anna Polikarpova / Maxim Kirillov | Evgenia Surkova / Denis Kozlov |
| Junior men | Mikhail Kolyada | Alexei Genya | Alexander Petrov |
| Junior ladies | Serafima Sakhanovich | Evgenia Medvedeva | Evgenia Gerasimova |
| Junior pairs | Anastasia Ragozina / Vladislav Perebatov | Ekaterina Pribilova / Arseniy Repkin | |
| Junior ice dancing | Daria Morozova / Mikhail Zhirnov | Кristina Baklanova / Andrei Bagin | Betina Popova / Yuri Vlasenko |
Youth Championships – Elder Age
| Discipline | Gold | Silver | Bronze |
| Men | Andrei Lazukin | Alexander Petrov | Andrei Zuber |
| Ladies | Evgenia Medvedeva | Alsu Kayumova | Anna Pogorilaya |
| Pairs | Lina Fedorova / Maxim Miroshkin | Kristina Bogdanova / Andrei Kositsin | Arina Chernyavskaya / António Souza-Cordeiro |
| Ice dancing | Sofia Evdokimova / Egor Bazin | Betina Popova / Yuri Vlasenko | Anastasia Voronkova / Nikita Trushkov |
Youth Championships – Younger Age
| Discipline | Gold | Silver | Bronze |
| Men | Alexei Genya | Alexander Petrov | Alexei Krasnozhon |
| Ladies | Serafima Sakhanovich | Natalia Ogoreltseva | Uliana Titushkina |
| Pairs | No pairs' discipline | | |
| Ice dancing | No Ice dancing discipline | | |

== Senior Championships ==
Top pairs' teams Tatiana Volosozhar / Maxim Trankov and Yuko Kavaguti / Alexander Smirnov appealed to the president of the Russian Figure Skating Federation, Alexander Gorshkov, to release them on medical grounds from participating in the championship, which is part of the selection process for the European and World Championships. Gorshkov said the pairs had earned their berths by virtue of their strong Grand Prix results and granted their exemptions from the Russian Championships. Nikolai Morozov, the coach of Grand Prix Final bronze medalist Alena Leonova, said she had also already earned her place in the team and could have missed the event but she chose to compete.

Evgeni Plushenko placed first in the men's short program, with Artur Gachinski and Zhan Bush in second and third respectively. Plushenko won his ninth national title. Gachinski won silver and Voronov climbed from fifth after the short to take the bronze medal.

Adelina Sotnikova won the ladies' short program, Ksenia Makarova was second, and Yulia Lipnitskaya third. Sotnikova won her third national title, Lipnitskaya won silver, and Leonova took bronze. In the free skate, Lipnitskaya earned the highest TES (technical elements score), followed by 12-year-olds Radionova and Medvedeva, who were ineligible for junior international competitions.

Vera Bazarova / Yuri Larionov took the lead in the pairs' short program, with Anastasia Martiusheva / Alexei Rogonov and Ksenia Stolbova / Fedor Klimov in second and third. Bazarova / Larionov won their first national title, while Stolbova / Klimov won silver and Martiusheva / Rogonov the bronze.

Ekaterina Bobrova / Dmitri Soloviev placed first in the short dance, with Elena Ilinykh / Nikita Katsalapov and Ekaterina Riazanova / Ilia Tkachenko in second and third respectively. Bobrova / Soloviev won their second national title, Ilinykh / Katsalapov won silver, and Riazanova / Tkachenko held on for the bronze although Pushkash / Guerreiro were third in the free dance. Riazanova was injured a couple of weeks before the event; she sustained a concussion and a broken nose when her partner accidentally elbowed her in practice.

The team to the European Championships was named on December 28, 2011. The World Championships team was announced on February 23, 2012, but only two ladies were confirmed, with the third lady (Makarova) confirmed on March 14.

=== Schedule ===
Local time, UTC/GMT +04:00

- Sunday, December 25
  - 14:00–14:30 – Opening ceremony
  - 14:45–16:15 – Short dance
  - 16:30–18:30 – Pairs' short
  - 18:45–21:15 – Men's short
- Monday, December 26
  - 14:00–16:30 – Ladies' short
  - 16:45–19:45 – Men's free
  - 20:00–22:00 – Free dance
- Tuesday, December 27
  - 16:00–18:25 – Pairs' free
  - 18:40–21:30 – Ladies' free
- Wednesday, December 28
  - 16:00–16:30 – Medal ceremonies
  - 16:45–19:15 – Exhibitions

=== Results ===
==== Men ====
| Rank | Name | Region | Total points | SP | | FS | |
|---|---|---|---|---|---|---|---|
| 1 | Evgeni Plushenko | Saint Petersburg | 259.67 | 1 | 88.24 | 1 | 171.43 |
| 2 | Artur Gachinski | Saint Petersburg | 249.58 | 2 | 83.52 | 2 | 166.06 |
| 3 | Sergei Voronov | Moscow | 240.79 | 5 | 76.35 | 3 | 164.44 |
| 4 | Zhan Bush | Saint Petersburg / Chelyabinsk | 223.30 | 3 | 81.81 | 6 | 141.49 |
| 5 | Artur Dmitriev Jr. | Moscow / Saint Petersburg | 220.29 | 4 | 79.69 | 7 | 140.60 |
| 6 | Ivan Bariev | Moscow | 219.87 | 10 | 69.56 | 4 | 150.31 |
| 7 | Konstantin Menshov | Saint Petersburg | 219.28 | 6 | 74.19 | 5 | 145.09 |
| 8 | Gordei Gorshkov | Saint Petersburg | 210.28 | 8 | 69.84 | 8 | 140.44 |
| 9 | Stanislav Kovalev | Moscow | 203.33 | 11 | 68.10 | 9 | 135.23 |
| 10 | Artem Grigoriev | Moscow | 201.06 | 7 | 72.90 | 10 | 128.16 |
| 11 | Artem Borodulin | Moscow | 194.81 | 9 | 69.76 | 12 | 125.05 |
| 12 | Maxim Kovtun | Ekaterinburg | 193.93 | 12 | 66.11 | 11 | 127.82 |
| 13 | Mark Shakhmatov | Moscow | 178.35 | 17 | 58.20 | 13 | 120.15 |
| 14 | Stanislav Samokhin | Moscow | 169.73 | 14 | 63.45 | 16 | 106.28 |
| 15 | Feodosiy Efremenkov | Moscow | 166.07 | 16 | 59.57 | 15 | 106.50 |
| 16 | Alexander Stepanov | Saint Petersburg | 165.34 | 18 | 54.73 | 14 | 110.61 |
| 17 | Vladislav Sezganov | Saint Petersburg | 164.19 | 15 | 61.10 | 17 | 103.09 |
| WD | Ivan Tretiakov | Moscow | | 13 | 64.51 | | |

==== Ladies ====
| Rank | Name | Region | Total points | SP | | FS | |
|---|---|---|---|---|---|---|---|
| 1 | Adelina Sotnikova | Moscow | 193.71 | 1 | 68.65 | 2 | 125.06 |
| 2 | Yulia Lipnitskaya | Moscow | 191.65 | 3 | 63.11 | 1 | 128.54 |
| 3 | Alena Leonova | Saint Petersburg | 178.15 | 5 | 59.95 | 3 | 118.20 |
| 4 | Ksenia Makarova | Saint Petersburg | 175.49 | 2 | 64.30 | 6 | 111.19 |
| 5 | Elena Radionova | Moscow | 174.81 | 6 | 59.10 | 5 | 115.71 |
| 6 | Elizaveta Tuktamysheva | Saint Petersburg | 174.40 | 7 | 58.32 | 4 | 116.08 |
| 7 | Polina Korobeynikova | Moscow | 165.57 | 8 | 57.64 | 9 | 107.93 |
| 8 | Evgenia Medvedeva | Moscow | 161.74 | 11 | 53.21 | 8 | 108.53 |
| 9 | Sofia Biryukova | Moscow | 156.11 | 4 | 60.95 | 14 | 95.16 |
| 10 | Polina Shelepen | Moscow | 154.78 | 17 | 45.44 | 7 | 109.34 |
| 11 | Anna Shershak | Moscow | 152.11 | 9 | 55.29 | 13 | 96.82 |
| 12 | Evgenia Gerasimova | Saint Petersburg | 152.02 | 13 | 52.58 | 10 | 99.44 |
| 13 | Maria Artemieva | Saint Petersburg | 148.44 | 10 | 55.25 | 15 | 93.19 |
| 14 | Polina Agafonova | Saint Petersburg | 148.14 | 15 | 50.30 | 11 | 97.84 |
| 15 | Alexandra Deeva | Moscow | 144.50 | 12 | 53.21 | 16 | 91.29 |
| 16 | Sofia Mishina | Moscow | 143.74 | 16 | 46.55 | 13 | 97.19 |
| 17 | Anna Ovcharova | Moscow | 134.67 | 14 | 52.51 | 18 | 82.16 |
| 18 | Maria Stavitskaia | Saint Petersburg | 130.72 | 18 | 43.10 | 17 | 87.62 |

==== Pairs ====
| Rank | Name | Region | Total points | SP | | FS | |
|---|---|---|---|---|---|---|---|
| 1 | Vera Bazarova / Yuri Larionov | Saransk | 194.86 | 1 | 68.83 | 1 | 126.03 |
| 2 | Ksenia Stolbova / Fedor Klimov | Saint Petersburg | 182.13 | 3 | 58.46 | 2 | 123.67 |
| 3 | Anastasia Martiusheva / Alexei Rogonov | Moscow | 179.94 | 2 | 60.25 | 3 | 119.69 |
| 4 | Katarina Gerboldt / Alexander Enbert | Saint Petersburg | 174.39 | 5 | 56.67 | 4 | 117.72 |
| 5 | Vasilisa Davankova / Andrei Deputat | Moscow | 168.79 | 7 | 53.32 | 5 | 115.47 |
| 6 | Lubov Iliushechkina / Nodari Maisuradze | Moscow | 167.74 | 4 | 57.00 | 6 | 110.74 |
| 7 | Ekaterina Petaikina / Maxim Kurdyukov | Moscow | 157.46 | 8 | 51.25 | 7 | 106.21 |
| 8 | Tatiana Novik / Andrei Novoselov | Moscow | 155.96 | 6 | 54.09 | 8 | 101.87 |
| 9 | Tatiana Tudvaseva / Sergei Lisiev | Saransk | 142.78 | 9 | 49.00 | 9 | 93.78 |
| 10 | Maria Vigalova / Egor Zakroev | Perm | 135.98 | 11 | 42.90 | 10 | 93.08 |
| 11 | Oksana Nagalatiy / Konstantin Bezmaternikh | Saint Petersburg | 122.98 | 10 | 45.34 | 12 | 77.64 |
| 12 | Jana Volkova / Alexei Petryanin | Perm | 114.34 | 12 | 33.08 | 11 | 81.26 |

==== Ice dancing ====
| Rank | Name | Region | Total points | SD | | FD | |
|---|---|---|---|---|---|---|---|
| 1 | Ekaterina Bobrova / Dmitri Soloviev | Moscow | 171.47 | 1 | 70.23 | 1 | 101.24 |
| 2 | Elena Ilinykh / Nikita Katsalapov | Moscow | 161.94 | 2 | 66.94 | 2 | 95.00 |
| 3 | Ekaterina Riazanova / Ilia Tkachenko | Moscow Oblast | 154.65 | 3 | 65.22 | 4 | 89.43 |
| 4 | Ekaterina Pushkash / Jonathan Guerreiro | Moscow | 150.57 | 4 | 60.25 | 3 | 90.32 |
| 5 | Ksenia Monko / Kirill Khaliavin | Moscow | 146.28 | 5 | 58.27 | 5 | 88.01 |
| 6 | Valeria Starygina / Ivan Volobuiev | Moscow | 128.43 | 6 | 54.67 | 7 | 73.76 |
| 7 | Kristina Gorshkova / Vitali Butikov | Moscow | 120.88 | 7 | 48.68 | 8 | 72.20 |
| 8 | Anna Polikarpova / Maxim Kirillov | Tolyatti | 119.57 | 9 | 45.64 | 6 | 73.93 |
| 9 | Anastasia Kabanova / Nikolai Babin | Moscow Oblast | 114.85 | 8 | 46.24 | 9 | 68.61 |
| 10 | Evgenia Shakhtarina / Denis Kozlov | Kirov | 92.53 | 10 | 35.69 | 10 | 56.84 |

== Junior Championships ==
The 2012 Russian Junior Championships (Russian: Первенство России 2012) were held in Novogorsk, Khimki from 5–7 February 2012.

Zhan Bush won the junior men's title. He and Artur Dmitriev Jr. received Russia's two berths to the World Junior Championships.

Adelina Sotnikova and Elizaveta Tuktamysheva were released from competing at the Russian Junior Championships and automatically assigned to the World Junior Championships. Yulia Lipnitskaya won the ladies' junior title, followed by Polina Shelepen and Elena Radionova. Lipnitskaya received the last available spot to Junior Worlds.

Vasilisa Davankova / Andrei Deputat won the junior pairs' title while Ekaterina Petaikina / Maxim Kurdyukov were the silver medalists and Kamilla Gainetdinova / Ivan Bich the bronze medalists. Deputat was released by Ukraine to skate for Russia at the World Junior Championships, along with the other medalists. In the free skate, Gainetdinova/Bich successfully landed side-by-side (sbs) triple lutzes, receiving 6.70 points for the element, and also included a sbs triple loop, double axel sequence, receiving 5.99 points due to some negative grades of execution.

Victoria Sinitsina / Ruslan Zhiganshin won gold while Alexandra Stepanova / Ivan Bukin took silver and Valeria Zenkova / Valerie Sinitsin the bronze. Along with Sinitsina / Zhiganshin and Stepanova / Bukin, Anna Yanovskaia / Sergey Mozgov were selected for Junior Worlds due to their Junior Grand Prix results.

=== Schedule ===
- Sunday, February 5
  - 14:00–16:30 – Men's short
  - 17:35–19:30 – Pairs' short
  - 19:45–21:15 – Short dance
- Monday, February 6
  - 14:00–16:30 – Ladies' short
  - 16:45-19:30 – Men's free
  - 19:45-21:30 – Free dance
- Tuesday, February 7
  - 13:00–15:15 – Pairs' free
  - 15:30–18:00 – Ladies' free

=== Results ===
==== Men ====
| Rank | Name | Region | Total points | SP | | FS | |
|---|---|---|---|---|---|---|---|
| 1 | Zhan Bush | Saint Petersburg / Chelyabinsk | 224.08 | 1 | 76.70 | 1 | 147.38 |
| 2 | Artur Dmitriev Jr. | Moscow / Saint Petersburg | 200.89 | 2 | 74.66 | 4 | 126.23 |
| 3 | Maxim Kovtun | Yekaterinburg | 193.95 | 5 | 65.21 | 2 | 128.74 |
| 4 | Feodosiy Efremenkov | Moscow | 193.45 | 4 | 66.92 | 3 | 126.53 |
| 5 | Konstantin Milyukov | Kazan | 186.23 | 7 | 60.08 | 5 | 126.15 |
| 6 | Mikhail Kolyada | Saint Petersburg | 183.87 | 3 | 72.82 | 10 | 111.05 |
| 7 | Vladislav Tarasenko | Saint Petersburg | 179.59 | 11 | 56.22 | 6 | 123.37 |
| 8 | Moris Kvitelashvili | Moscow | 176.73 | 9 | 58.05 | 7 | 118.68 |
| 9 | Alexei Genya | Moscow Oblast | 174.94 | 6 | 60.08 | 8 | 114.86 |
| 10 | Makar Ignatov | Saint Petersburg | 169.93 | 10 | 56.85 | 9 | 113.08 |
| 11 | Adian Pitkeev | Moscow | 162.73 | 8 | 59.54 | 12 | 103.19 |
| 12 | Alexander Petrov | Saint Petersburg | 160.49 | 13 | 54.12 | 11 | 106.37 |
| 13 | Andrei Lazukin | T / S | 153.55 | 12 | 55.54 | 15 | 98.01 |
| 14 | Alexei Krasnozhon | Saint Petersburg | 153.29 | 14 | 51.36 | 14 | 101.93 |
| 15 | Andrei Zuber | Saint Petersburg | 146.00 | 16 | 43.24 | 13 | 102.76 |
| 16 | Vasili Velikov | Saint Petersburg | 142.80 | 15 | 49.49 | 16 | 93.31 |
| WD | Alexander Samarin | Moscow | | | | | |

==== Ladies ====
| Rank | Name | Region | Total points | SP | | FS | |
|---|---|---|---|---|---|---|---|
| 1 | Yulia Lipnitskaya | Moscow | 191.92 | 1 | 65.28 | 1 | 126.64 |
| 2 | Polina Shelepen | Moscow | 182.54 | 2 | 61.93 | 3 | 120.61 |
| 3 | Elena Radionova | Moscow | 178.94 | 4 | 57.19 | 2 | 121.75 |
| 4 | Polina Agafonova | Saint Petersburg | 170.69 | 3 | 60.59 | 4 | 110.10 |
| 5 | Anna Shershak | Moscow | 162.26 | 6 | 54.92 | 6 | 107.34 |
| 6 | Evgenia Medvedeva | Moscow | 158.50 | 7 | 54.86 | 7 | 103.64 |
| 7 | Natalia Ogoreltseva | I / S | 156.45 | 11 | 48.83 | 5 | 107.62 |
| 8 | Kristina Zaseeva | Moscow | 148.73 | 5 | 56.87 | 12 | 91.86 |
| 9 | Evgenia Gerasimova | Saint Petersburg | 147.38 | 13 | 46.29 | 8 | 101.09 |
| 10 | Maria Stavitskaia | Saint Petersburg | 146.80 | 10 | 48.90 | 10 | 97.90 |
| 11 | Uliana Titushkina | Saint Petersburg | 145.91 | 12 | 47.91 | 9 | 98.00 |
| 12 | Serafima Sakhanovich | Saint Petersburg | 143.89 | 9 | 50.28 | 11 | 93.61 |
| 13 | Anna Pogorilaya | Moscow | 142.38 | 8 | 50.96 | 13 | 91.42 |
| 14 | Alsu Kayumova | Moscow | 128.19 | 16 | 41.14 | 14 | 87.05 |
| 15 | Arina Petrova | Saint Petersburg | 126.24 | 14 | 45.22 | 17 | 81.02 |
| 16 | Alexandra Deeva | Moscow | 122.02 | 18 | 36.71 | 15 | 85.31 |
| 17 | Аlina Кaravaeva | Saint Petersburg | 121.13 | 17 | 38.93 | 16 | 82.20 |
| 18 | Sofya Mishina | Moscow | 106.81 | 15 | 43.34 | 18 | 63.47 |

==== Pairs ====
| Rank | Name | Region | Total points | SP | | FS | |
|---|---|---|---|---|---|---|---|
| 1 | Vasilisa Davankova / Andrei Deputat | Moscow | 169.83 | 1 | 55.06 | 1 | 114.77 |
| 2 | Ekaterina Petaikina / Maxim Kurdyukov | Moscow | 163.65 | 2 | 54.81 | 2 | 108.84 |
| 3 | Kamilla Gainetdinova / Ivan Bich | Saint Petersburg | 161.30 | 3 | 53.92 | 3 | 107.38 |
| 4 | Maria Vigalova / Egor Zakroev | Perm | 145.54 | 4 | 48.67 | 4 | 96.87 |
| 5 | Tatiana Tudvaseva / Sergei Lisiev | Saransk | 131.91 | 7 | 45.49 | 5 | 86.42 |
| 6 | Ekaterina Kuklina / Maxim Petukhov | Perm | 124.51 | 6 | 45.60 | 6 | 78.91 |
| 7 | Alexandra Vasilieva / Yuri Shevchuk | Saint Petersburg | 123.63 | 8 | 45.20 | 7 | 78.43 |
| 8 | Kristina Bogdanova / Andrei Kositsin | Saint Petersburg | 116.40 | 5 | 46.53 | 11 | 69.87 |
| 9 | Anastasia Ragozina / Vladislav Perebatov | Perm | 115.68 | 10 | 43.47 | 10 | 72.21 |
| 10 | Daria Beklemisheva / Nikita Ermolaev | Saint Petersburg | 114.43 | 11 | 40.67 | 8 | 73.76 |
| 11 | Jana Volkova / Alexei Petryanin | Perm | 111.40 | 12 | 38.59 | 9 | 72.81 |
| WD | Ekaterina Krutskikh / Vladimir Morozov | Moscow | | 9 | 44.34 | | |

==== Ice dancing ====
| Rank | Name | Region | Total points | SD | | FD | |
|---|---|---|---|---|---|---|---|
| 1 | Victoria Sinitsina / Ruslan Zhiganshin | Moscow | 158.23 | 1 | 66.28 | 1 | 91.95 |
| 2 | Alexandra Stepanova / Ivan Bukin | Moscow | 155.72 | 2 | 64.48 | 2 | 91.24 |
| 3 | Valeria Zenkova / Valerie Sinitsin | Moscow | 142.30 | 3 | 61.43 | 4 | 80.87 |
| 4 | Anna Yanovskaia / Sergey Mozgov | Moscow | 136.41 | 4 | 55.47 | 3 | 80.94 |
| 5 | Evgenia Kosigina / Nikolai Moroshkin | Moscow Oblast | 132.72 | 5 | 55.18 | 5 | 77.54 |
| 6 | Sofia Evdokimova / Egor Bazin | Tolyatti | 128.41 | 7 | 52.74 | 7 | 75.67 |
| 7 | Maria Simonova / Dmitri Dragun | Tolyatti | 127.28 | 9 | 49.98 | 6 | 77.30 |
| 8 | Valeria Loseva / Denis Lunin | Moscow | 123.99 | 8 | 51.77 | 8 | 72.22 |
| 9 | Daria Morozova / Mikhail Zhirnov | Moscow | 117.77 | 6 | 55.03 | 12 | 62.74 |
| 10 | Кristina Baklanova / Andrei Bagin | Moscow | 117.35 | 10 | 48.57 | 9 | 68.78 |
| 11 | Ksenia Korobkova / Daniil Gleichengauz | Moscow | 110.68 | 12 | 46.09 | 11 | 64.59 |
| 12 | Betina Popova / Yuri Vlasenko | Moscow | 110.28 | 13 | 43.16 | 10 | 67.12 |
| 13 | Anastasia Skoptsova / Nikita Nazarov | Moscow Oblast | 107.15 | 11 | 47.81 | 13 | 59.34 |
| 14 | Viktoria Sheneva / Pavel Golovishnikov | Moscow | 99.00 | 14 | 42.79 | 14 | 56.21 |
| 15 | Daria Malaeva / Vladislav Ishin | Tolyatti | 92.07 | 15 | 37.71 | 15 | 54.36 |
