= Egor Zakroev =

Russian pair skater (born 1993)

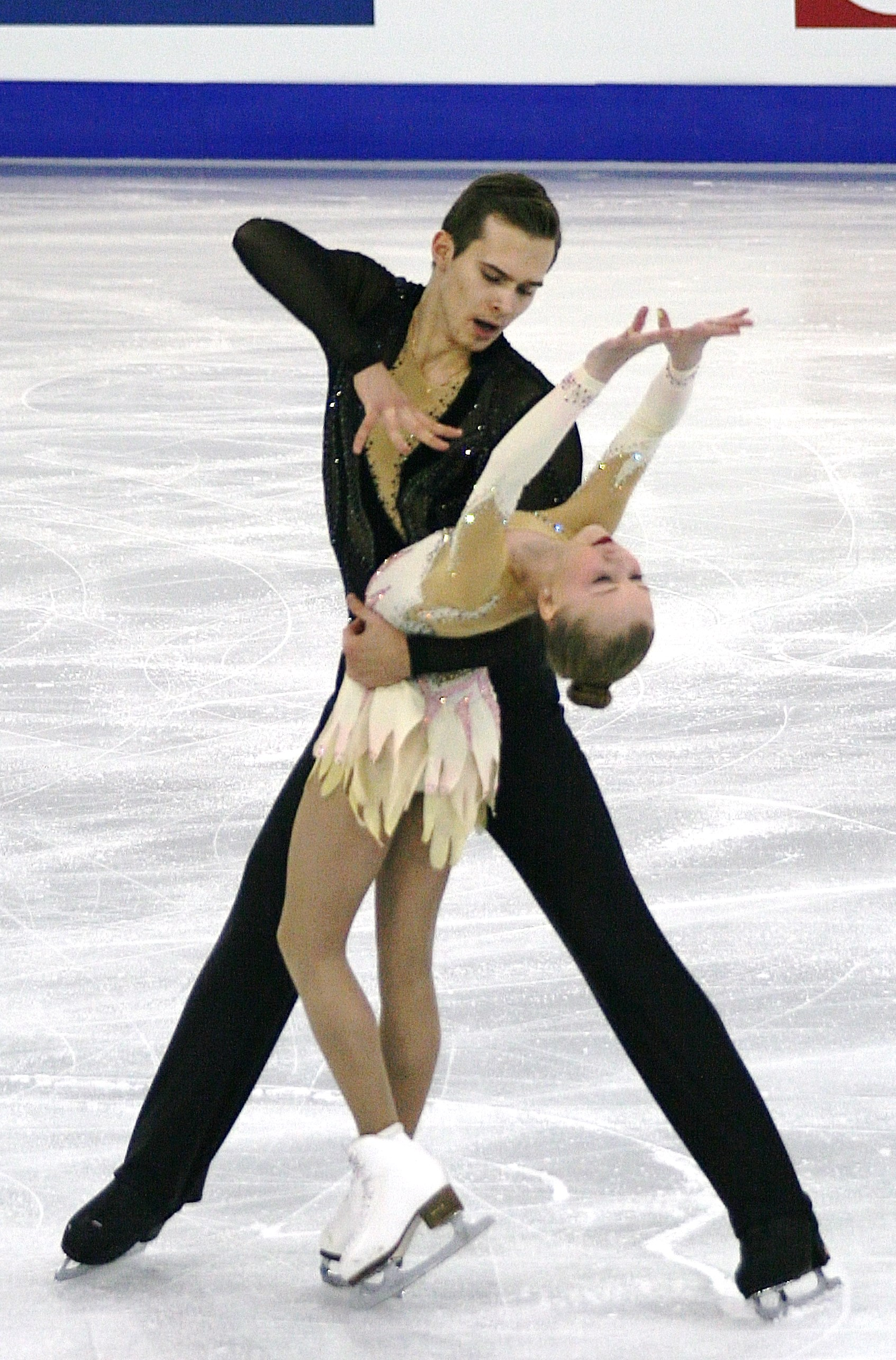
- Vigalova and Zakroev at the 2014–15 JGP Final

Personal information
- Full name: Egor Mikhailovich Zakroev
- Born: 31 December 1993 (age 32) Achinsk, Russia
- Home town: Perm
- Height: 1.82 m (5 ft 11 1/2 in)

Figure skating career
- Country: Russia
- Coach: Natalia Pavlova
Medal record
Representing Russia
Figure skating: Pairs
World Junior Championships
Bronze medal – third place	2014 Sofia	Pairs
Junior Grand Prix Final
Silver medal – second place	2013–14 Fukuoka	Pairs
Bronze medal – third place	2012–13 Sochi	Pairs
Bronze medal – third place	2014-15 Barcelona	Pairs

Egor Mikhailovich Zakroev (Russian: Егор Михайлович Закроев; born 31 December 1993) is a Russian pair skater. With partner Maria Vigalova, he is the 2014 World Junior bronze medalist, a two-time JGP Final medalist (2013 silver, 2012 bronze), and the 2014 Russian national senior bronze medalist.

== Personal life ==
Egor Mikhailovich Zakroev was born 31 December 1993 in Achinsk, Krasnoyarsk Krai, Russia. He relocated to Perm in 2010.

== Career ==
Zakroev started skating in Achinsk, taught by Gennadiy Petrov. In 2010, he teamed up with Maria Vigalova in Perm. The two were coached by Valentina Tiukova, Valeri Tiukov, and Pavel Sliusarenko at Perm's Figure Skating Academy. Olga Volozhinskaya visits the pair three to four times a year to work on choreography and presentation.

In the 2011–12 season, Vigalova/Zakroev finished tenth in their senior Russian Championships debut and placed fourth on the junior level.

Vigalova/Zakroev debuted on the Junior Grand Prix series in the 2012–13 season. They won the bronze medal at JGP Austria and silver at JGP Germany, qualifying them for the JGP Final in Sochi, Russia, where they won the bronze medal. At the Russian Championships, the pair finished ninth on the senior level and then fourth again on the junior level behind Kamilla Gainetdinova / Ivan Bich.

Vigalova/Zakroev's first event of the 2013–14 season was the 2013 JGP Latvia where they won the bronze medal behind teammates Evgenia Tarasova / Vladimir Morozov. They won gold for the first time at the 2013 JGP Slovakia while posting new personal best scores – 57.75 (SP), 110.35 (FS), 168.10 points (overall). Their results qualified them to the JGP Final in Fukuoka, Japan. At the final, Vigalova/Zakroev placed third in the short program and first in the free skate, winning the silver medal behind Yu Xiaoyu / Jin Yang. After the event, Zakroev underwent treatment for cysts. At the Russian Championships, the pair won bronze on the senior level and silver on the junior level. They were assigned to the 2014 World Junior Championships in Sofia, Bulgaria, where they won the bronze medal after placing fourth in the short program and third in the free skate.

In preparation for the 2014–15 season, Vigalova/Zakroev spent some time training in Sochi and Novogorsk, near Moscow, as well as their regular training site in Perm. Their first event of the season was at the 2014 JGP Estonia where they won the gold medal with a score of 161.83 points. Their next event at the 2014 JGP Croatia, they won another gold with a total of 167.98 points qualifying them to their third ISU JGP Final held in Barcelona, Spain where they took the bronze medal behind teammates Lina Fedorova / Maxim Miroshkin.

== Programs ==
(with Vigalova)

Season	Short program	Free skating	Exhibition
2014-2015	The Messiah Will Come Again by Gary Moore	The Phantom of the Opera by Andrew Lloyd Webber	
2013–2014	Capone by Ronan Hardiman	Giselle by Adolphe Adam	Bleeding Love by Leona Lewis
2012–2013	Capone by Ronan Hardiman	Symphony on a Battle Lost by Benny Richter, Marc Terenzi	
2011–2012	Adagio in G minor by Tomaso Albinoni	Pearl Harbor by Hans Zimmer	

== Competitive highlights ==
CS: Challenger Series; JGP: Junior Grand Prix

With Vigalova

International
Event	2011–12	2012–13	2013–14	2014–15
CS Volvo Open				2nd
International: Junior
Junior Worlds			3rd	WD
JGP Final		3rd	2nd	3rd
JGP Croatia				1st
JGP Austria		3rd		
JGP Estonia				1st
JGP Germany		2nd		
JGP Latvia			3rd	
JGP Slovakia			1st	
Warsaw Cup			1st J.	
National
Russian Champ.	10th	9th	3rd	WD
Russian Junior	4th	4th	2nd	1st
J. = Junior level; WD = Withdrew
