= 2012 Rostelecom Cup =

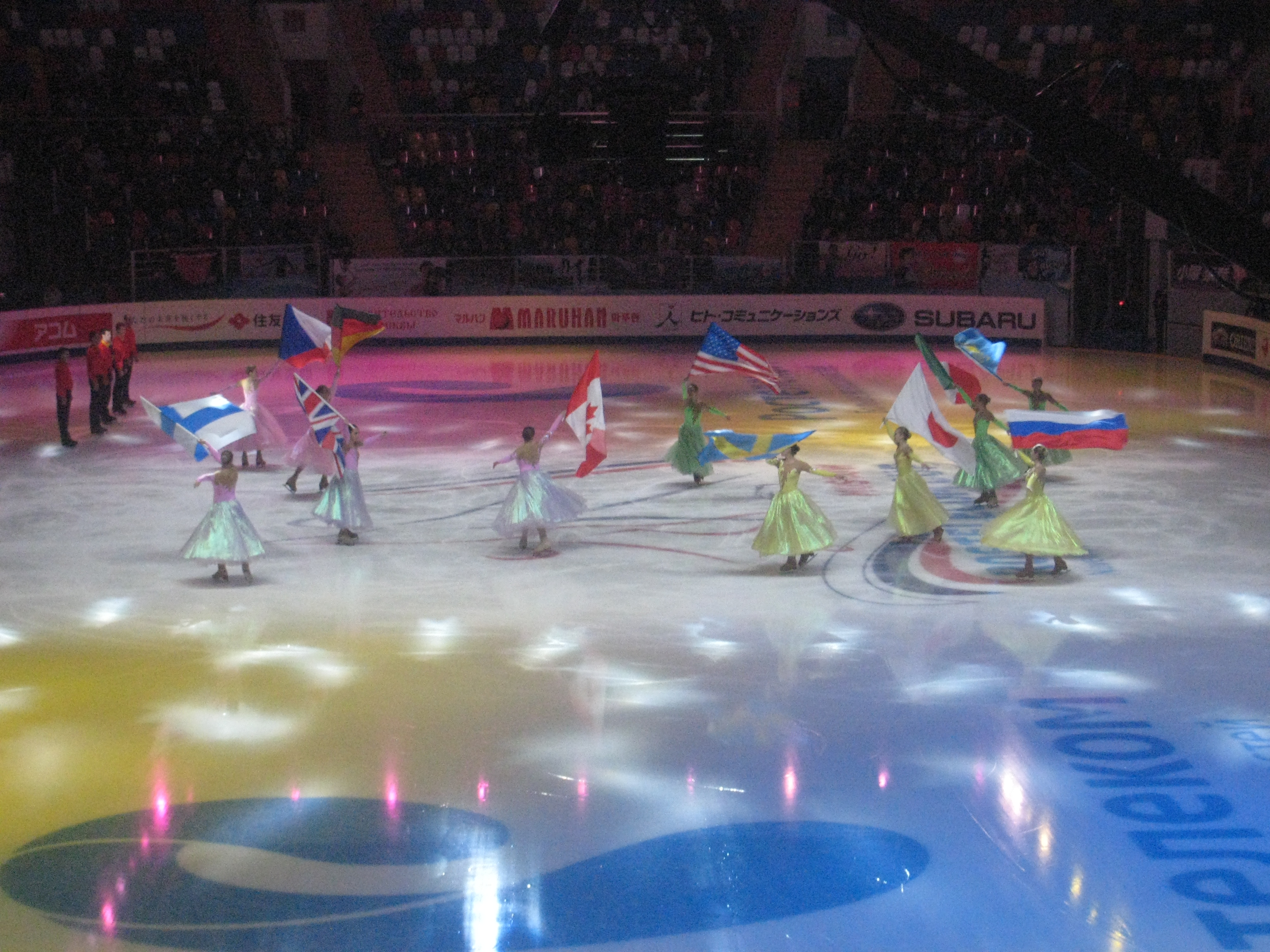
- Opening Ceremony of ROSTELECOM CUP 2012 (International figure skating competition).
- Type: Grand Prix
- Date: November 8 – 11
- Season: 2012–13
- Location: Moscow
- Host: Figure Skating Federation of Russia
- Venue: Ice Palace Megasport

Champions
- Men's singles: (Canada) Patrick Chan
- Ladies' singles: (Finland) Kiira Korpi
- Pairs: (Russia) Tatiana Volosozhar / Maxim Trankov
- Ice dance: (Canada) Tessa Virtue / Scott Moir
- Previous: 2011 Rostelecom Cup
- Next: 2013 Rostelecom Cup
- Previous Grand Prix: 2012 Cup of China
- Next Grand Prix: 2012 Trophée Éric Bompard

The 2012 Rostelecom Cup was the fourth event of six in the 2012–13 ISU Grand Prix of Figure Skating, a senior-level international invitational competition series. It was held at the Ice Palace Megasport in Moscow on November 8–11. Medals were awarded in the disciplines of men's singles, ladies' singles, pair skating, and ice dancing. Skaters earned points toward qualifying for the 2012–13 Grand Prix Final.

== Eligibility ==
Skaters who reached the age of 14 by July 1, 2012, were eligible to compete on the senior Grand Prix circuit.

Prior to competing in a Grand Prix event, skaters were required to have earned the following scores (3/5 of the top scores at the 2012 World Championships):

Discipline	Minimum
Men	159.66
Ladies	113.43
Pairs	120.90
Ice dancing	109.59

== Entries ==
The entries were as follows.

Country	Men	Ladies	Pairs	Ice dancing
Canada	Patrick Chan		Paige Lawrence / Rudi Swiegers	Tessa Virtue / Scott Moir; Nicole Orford / Thomas Williams
Czech Republic	Michal Březina			
Finland		Kiira Korpi		
United Kingdom				Penny Coomes / Nicholas Buckland
Germany				Nelli Zhiganshina / Alexander Gazsi
Israel			Danielle Montalbano / Evgeni Krasnopolski	
Italy		Valentina Marchei	Nicole Della Monica / Matteo Guarise	
Japan	Takahiko Kozuka; Nobunari Oda	Kanako Murakami		
Kazakhstan	Denis Ten			
Russia	Zhan Bush; Artur Gachinski; Konstantin Menshov	Alena Leonova; Adelina Sotnikova; Polina Korobeynikova	Vera Bazarova / Yuri Larionov; Tatiana Volosozhar / Maxim Trankov; Anastasia Martiusheva / Alexei Rogonov	Elena Ilinykh / Nikita Katsalapov; Ksenia Monko / Kirill Khaliavin; Victoria Sinitsina / Ruslan Zhiganshin
Sweden		Viktoria Helgesson		
United States	Richard Dornbush; Johnny Weir	Gracie Gold; Agnes Zawadzki; Caroline Zhang	Caydee Denney / John Coughlin; Tiffany Vise / Don Baldwin	Maia Shibutani / Alex Shibutani

== Overview ==
Canada's Patrick Chan led after the men's short program, followed by Russia's Konstantin Menshov and Japan's Takahiko Kozuka. Chan was also first in the free skating, with Nobunari Oda in second and Kozuka in third. Chan won the title, Kozuka finished with the silver medal, and the Czech Republic's Michal Březina took the bronze. Johnny Weir re-aggravated an injury to his anterior cruciate ligament and withdrew after the short program.

Gracie Gold of the United States won the ladies' short program ahead of Finland's Kiira Korpi and American Agnes Zawadzki. Korpi won the free skating and her first gold medal on the Grand Prix series, with Gold and Zawadzki taking silver and bronze respectively, their first GP medals.

Russia's Tatiana Volosozhar / Maxim Trankov won the pairs' short program ahead of teammates Vera Bazarova / Yuri Larionov and the United States' Caydee Denney / John Coughlin. The standings remained the same after the free skating.

Canada's Tessa Virtue / Scott Moir were first in the short dance, followed by Russia's Elena Ilinykh / Nikita Katsalapov and Victoria Sinitsina / Ruslan Zhiganshin. The standing remained the same after the free dance. Virtue / Moir won gold, Ilinykh / Katsalapov the silver, and Sinitsina / Zhiganshin their first senior Grand Prix medal.

== Results ==
=== Men ===
Rank	Name	Nation	Total points	SP		FS	
1	Patrick Chan	Canada	262.35	1	85.44	1	176.91
2	Takahiko Kozuka	Japan	229.99	3	76.34	3	153.65
3	Michal Březina	Czech Republic	224.56	6	73.83	4	150.73
4	Konstantin Menshov	Russia	223.72	2	76.73	5	146.99
5	Nobunari Oda	Japan	217.92	8	63.18	2	154.74
6	Richard Dornbush	United States	210.89	7	67.44	6	143.45
7	Artur Gachinski	Russia	209.84	5	74.07	7	135.77
8	Zhan Bush	Russia	199.37	4	74.50	8	124.87
9	Denis Ten	Kazakhstan	177.77	9	59.42	9	118.35
WD	Johnny Weir	United States		10	57.47		

=== Ladies ===
Rank	Name	Nation	Total points	SP		FS	
1	Kiira Korpi	Finland	177.19	2	61.55	1	115.64
2	Gracie Gold	United States	175.03	1	62.16	2	112.87
3	Agnes Zawadzki	United States	166.61	3	60.18	4	106.43
4	Kanako Murakami	Japan	166.34	6	56.78	3	109.56
5	Adelina Sotnikova	Russia	157.98	5	57.11	7	100.87
6	Alena Leonova	Russia	157.27	4	58.85	8	98.42
7	Polina Korobeynikova	Russia	153.32	8	51.45	6	101.87
8	Viktoria Helgesson	Sweden	151.48	7	54.10	9	97.38
9	Valentina Marchei	Italy	148.67	9	46.25	5	102.42
10	Caroline Zhang	United States	138.21	10	46.15	10	92.06

=== Pairs ===
Rank	Name	Nation	Total points	SP		FS	
1	Tatiana Volosozhar / Maxim Trankov	Russia	207.53	1	74.74	1	132.79
2	Vera Bazarova / Yuri Larionov	Russia	191.08	2	66.02	2	125.06
3	Caydee Denney / John Coughlin	United States	179.21	3	59.02	3	120.19
4	Paige Lawrence / Rudi Swiegers	Canada	154.16	4	51.86	4	102.30
5	Anastasia Martiusheva / Alexei Rogonov	Russia	150.15	5	50.90	5	99.25
6	Tiffany Vise / Don Baldwin	United States	143.15	7	45.91	6	97.24
7	Nicole Della Monica / Matteo Guarise	Italy	142.53	6	50.25	7	92.28

=== Ice dancing ===
Rank	Name	Nation	Total points	SD		FD	
1	Tessa Virtue / Scott Moir	Canada	173.99	1	70.65	1	103.34
2	Elena Ilinykh / Nikita Katsalapov	Russia	158.46	2	65.70	2	92.76
3	Victoria Sinitsina / Ruslan Zhiganshin	Russia	145.08	3	60.85	4	84.23
4	Maia Shibutani / Alex Shibutani	United States	140.91	4	58.26	5	82.65
5	Nelli Zhiganshina / Alexander Gazsi	Germany	140.54	6	55.53	3	85.01
6	Ksenia Monko / Kirill Khaliavin	Russia	135.84	5	55.81	6	80.03
7	Penny Coomes / Nicholas Buckland	United Kingdom	126.66	8	51.39	7	75.27
8	Nicole Orford / Thomas Williams	Canada	124.96	7	51.44	8	73.52
