= Olga Voložinskaja =

Soviet ice dancer

Olga Volozhinskaya
Personal information
- Full name: Olga Algertovna Volozhinskaya
- Born: 18 May 1962 (age 64) Tallinn, then part of Estonian SSR, Soviet Union

Figure skating career
- Country: Soviet Union
- Retired: 1986
Medal record
Figure skating: Ice dancing
Representing Soviet Union
European Championships
Silver medal – second place	1983 Dortmund	Ice dancing

Olga Algertovna Volozhinskaya (Estonian: Olga Voložinskaja; Russian: Ольга Альгертовна Воложинская, born 18 May 1962) is a former ice dancer who competed for the Soviet Union. With Alexander Svinin, she is the 1983 European silver medalist, 1985 Skate Canada International champion, and competed at the 1984 Winter Olympics in Sarajevo.

== Personal life ==
Volozhinskaya was born on 18 May 1962 in Tallinn. She married Russian figure skater Sergey Petrovskiy, with whom she has two sons, Nikita and Anton.

== Career ==
Volozhinskaya competed with Alexander Svinin for the Soviet Union. Winners of the 1980 Grand Prix International St. Gervais, they made their senior ISU Championship debut later that season at the 1981 World Championships, placing fifth. Volozhinskaya/Svinin were fourth at the 1982 European Championships and sixth at the 1982 World Championships. Their best international results came the next year — silver at the 1983 European Championships and fourth at the 1983 World Championships.

Volozhinskaya/Svinin placed fifth at the 1984 European Championships and were assigned to the 1984 Winter Olympics where they placed seventh. Although no longer sent to ISU Championships, they competed for two more seasons, winning gold at the 1984 Skate Canada International, bronze at the 1984 Prize of Moscow News, and silver at the 1985 Skate Canada International. After retiring from competition, they performed in ice shows in England and the United States.

Volozhinskaya is now a choreographer, based in Florida. Her clients have included Alena Leonova, Stacey Pensgen, Daniel Samohin, and Maria Vigalova / Egor Zakroev.

== Results ==
with Svinin

International
Event	77–78	78–79	79–80	80–81	81–82	82–83	83–84	84–85	85–86
Olympics							7th		
Worlds				5th	6th	4th			
Europeans					4th	2nd	5th		
Skate Canada								1st	2nd
Moscow News			6th		3rd			3rd	
St. Gervais				1st					
National
Soviet Champ.	6th	6th	3rd	4th	3rd	2nd	4th	4th	
