= Zhan Bush =

Russian figure skater

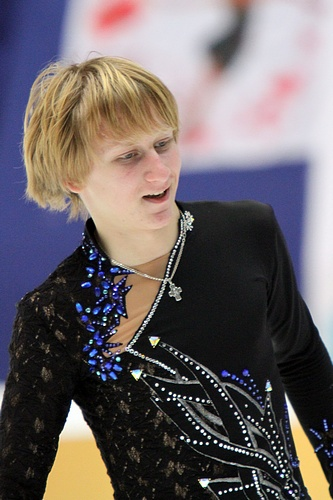
- Zhan Bush at the 2011 Junior Grand Prix Final

Personal information
- Full name: Zhan Viacheslavovich Bush
- Other names: Devinski (surname); Jean/Jan (first name)
- Born: 1 April 1993 (age 33) Chelyabinsk, Russia
- Height: 1.72 m (5 ft 7 1/2 in)

Figure skating career
- Country: Russia
- Coach: Svetlana Sokolovskaya
- Skating club: CSKA Moscow
- Began skating: 2001
Medal record
Representing Russia
Men's Figure skating
Russian Championships
Bronze medal – third place	2010 Saint Petersburg	men's singles

Zhan Viacheslavovich Bush (Russian: Жан Вячеславович Буш; born 1 April 1993) is a Russian figure skater.

He is the 2013 Cup of Nice bronze medalist, a four-time medalist on the ISU Junior Grand Prix series, and 2011 Russian national senior bronze medalist. He placed 5th at the 2012 World Junior Championships.

== Personal life ==
Bush was formerly known by the surname Devinski (Russian: Девинский), but switched to his mother's maiden name, Bush, with the consent of his whole family. His first name has sometimes been romanized as Jean or Jan.

He was born in Chelyabinsk, but his family moved to Israel soon after and returned to Russia seven years later. He spoke only Hebrew as a child, and learned Russian when the family returned. His parents enrolled him in figure skating to improve his health.

== Career ==
Bush began skating at age 8 in Chelyabinsk. He was coached by Larisa Yakovleva from 2004 until 2010. He competed as Devinski until the end of the 2007–08 season.

Bush finished 17th at the 2010 Russian Nationals. In spring 2010, he moved to Saint Petersburg to be coached by 1994 Olympic champion Alexei Urmanov. He won the bronze medal at the 2011 Russian Nationals.

In the 2011–12 season, Bush began appearing in senior international events, competing at the Finlandia Trophy, Nebelhorn Trophy, and Coupe de Nice. He then competed at the 2012 Russian Championships, and finished 4th with an overall score of 223.30 points. Bush was the first alternate for the 2012 European Championships in Sheffield, England. He won the gold medal at the 2012 Russian Junior Championships. Bush finished 5th at the 2012 World Junior Championships in Minsk, Belarus. Bush placed 10th at the 2012 World Team Trophy in Tokyo, Japan.

In 2012–13, Bush finished 5th at the 2012 Finlandia Trophy. At the 2012 Cup of Nice, he was 15th in the short program but won the long and finished 6th overall. Bush made his senior Grand Prix debut at the 2012 Rostelecom Cup.

In spring 2013, Bush changed coaches to Svetlana Sokolovskaya in Moscow. He won the bronze medal at the 2013 Cup of Nice.

== Programs ==
Season	Short program	Free skating	Exhibition
2013–2014	Sabre Dance by Aram Khachaturian (techno-mix)	Beethoven's 5 Secrets by OneRepublic performed by The Piano Guys	
2012–2013	Water for Elephants by James Newton Howard	Requiem for a Dream by Clint Mansell; Music by Jean-Michel Jarre	
2011–2012	Symphony No. 5 by Ludwig van Beethoven	Carmen by Georges Bizet	Turn Around by G. Leps, Valery Meladze
2010–2011	When I Close My Eyes by Igor Krutoy	The Rock by Hans Zimmer	

== Competitive highlights ==
International
Event	2007–08	2008–09	2009–10	2010–11	2011–12	2012–13	2013–14	2014–15	2015–16
GP Cup of China								WD	
GP Skate Canada								WD	
GP Rostel. Cup						8th			
CS Warsaw Cup									3rd
Cup of Nice					6th	6th	3rd		
Finlandia					8th	5th			
Nebelhorn					6th				
Ice Star							2nd		
Universiade							4th		
Volvo Cup							5th		
International: Junior
Junior Worlds				11th	5th				
JGP Final				7th					
JGP Austria				3rd					
JGP Croatia			3rd						
JGP France		9th							
JGP Hungary			3rd						
JGP U.K.				2nd					
National
Russian Champ.			17th	3rd	4th	12th	7th		
Russian Junior	13th	9th	5th	2nd	1st				
Team events
World Team; Trophy					5th T (10th P)				
GP = Grand Prix; CS = Challenger Series; JGP = Junior Grand Prix; J. = Junior level T = Team result; P = Personal result; Medals awarded for team result only.
