= Anastasia Martiusheva =

Russian pair skater

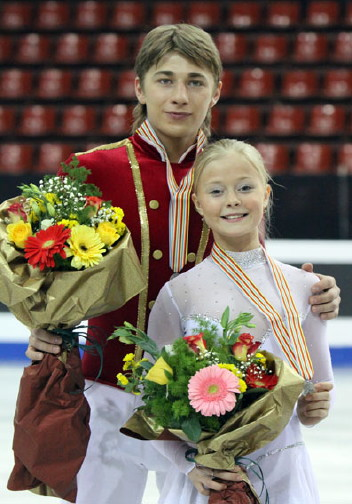
- Martiusheva/Rogonov in 2009.

Personal information
- Full name: Anastasia Vasilyevna Martiusheva
- Born: 17 March 1995 (age 31) Perm, Russia
- Home town: Moscow, Russia
- Height: 1.59 m (5 ft 3 in)

Figure skating career
- Country: Russia
- Coach: Natalia Pavlova
- Began skating: 2001
Medal record
Representing Russia
Figure skating: Pairs
Russian Championships
Bronze medal – third place	2012 Saransk	Pairs
World Junior Championships
Silver medal – second place	2009 Sofia	Pairs

Anastasia Vasilyevna Martiusheva (Russian: Анастасия Васильевна Мартюшева; born 17 March 1995) is a Russian pair skater. With Alexei Rogonov, she is the 2012 Ondrej Nepela Memorial champion, a two-time (2010, 2011) Golden Spin of Zagreb champion, and the 2009 World Junior silver medalist. They are the 2012 Russian national senior bronze medalists and 2009 junior champions.

== Career ==
Martiusheva began skating at the age of five-and-a-half. Initially a singles skater, she switched to pair skating at age ten.

=== Partnership with Rogonov ===
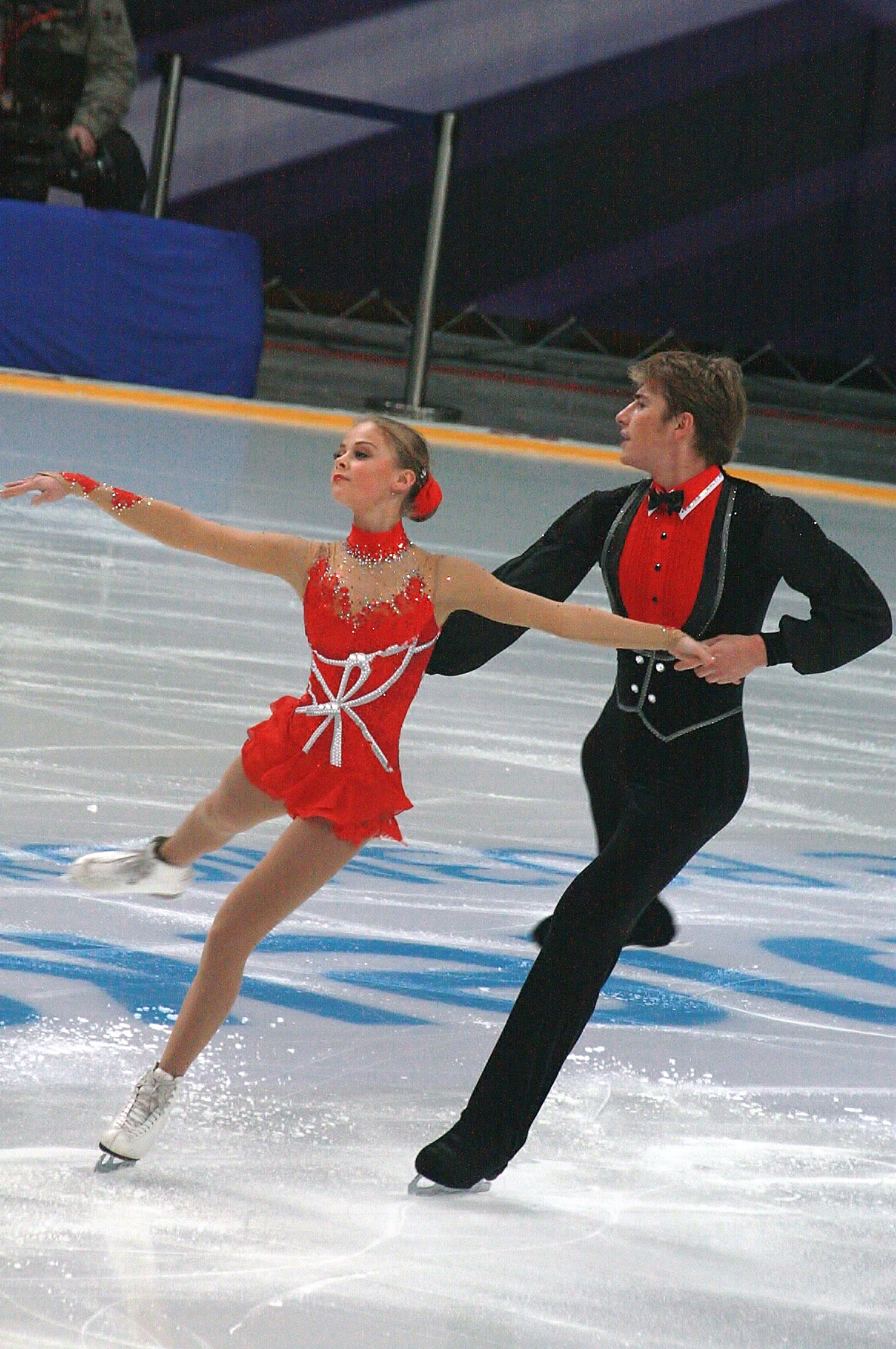
Martiusheva/Rogonov at the 2012 Rostelecom Cup

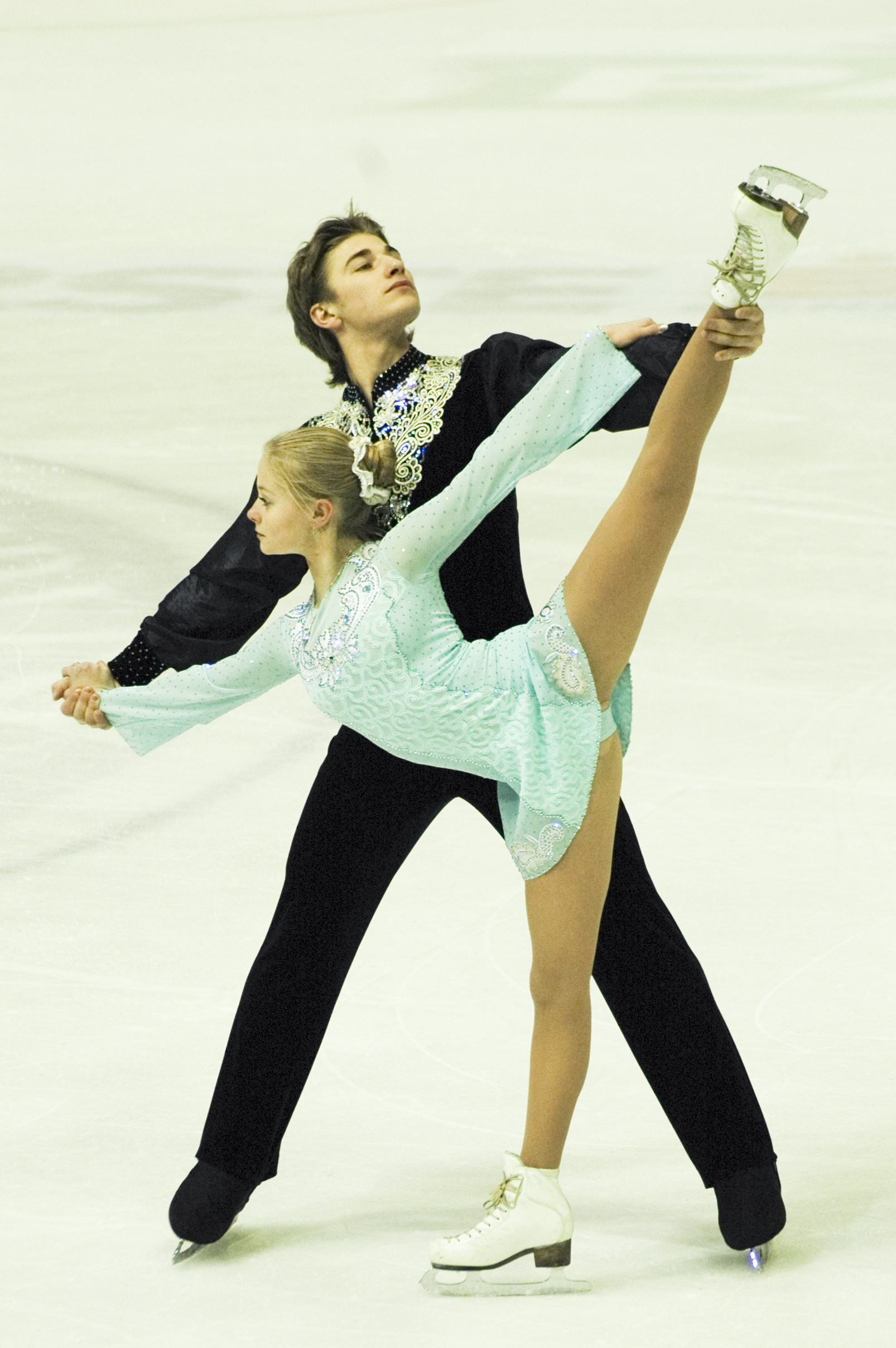
Martiusheva/Rogonov won the 2010 Golden Spin of Zagreb.

Martiusheva and Alexei Rogonov first met in Perm, skating in the same group but with different partners. After she relocated to Moscow and he made the same journey six months later, Natalia Pavlova paired them together, in 2006. The pair won the 2009 Russian Junior title. At the 2009 World Junior Championships, they were 11th after the short program but finished first in the long program, ahead of Lubov Iliushechkina / Nodari Maisuradze. They moved up to second overall and took the silver medal.

Martiusheva/Rogonov made their senior Grand Prix debut at the 2009 Cup of Russia, where they finished seventh. They finished 9th at Russian Nationals. During the 2010–11 season, they were assigned to 2010 Skate Canada International but withdrew from the event. They won the 2010 Golden Spin of Zagreb. At the 2011 Russian Nationals, they placed 9th in the short program and 7th in the long, to finish 9th overall.

During the 2011–12 season, Martiusheva/Rogonov won the 2011 Golden Spin of Zagreb and Warsaw Cup. At the 2012 Russian Nationals, they placed second in the short program and third in the free skate and won the bronze medal.

In the 2012–13 season, Martiusheva/Rogonov won gold at the 2012 Ondrej Nepela Memorial. They competed on the Grand Prix series for the first time since 2009, finishing 5th at both of their events, the 2012 Rostelecom Cup and the 2012 NHK Trophy. They set their personal best overall score of 162.25 points. They finished 6th at the 2013 Russian Championships.

In 2013–14, Martiusheva/Rogonov began their season by taking silver at the Lombardia Trophy, followed by another silver at the 2013 Ondrej Nepela Trophy. They were seventh at their first Grand Prix assignment, the 2013 Cup of China. A week later, the pair replaced the injured Yuko Kavaguti / Alexander Smirnov at the 2013 NHK Trophy. Two days before the 2014 Russian Championships, Martiusheva injured a leg muscle in a bad fall and doctors ordered the pair to withdraw. The partnership ended soon after.

In January 2014, Martiusheva began searching for a new partner. In June 2014, she tried out with Alexander Korovin.

== Programs ==
(with Rogonov)

Season	Short program	Free skating	Exhibition
2013–2014	Sarabande performed by Escala choreo. by Sergei Komolov, Alexei Zhelezniakov	Les Feuilles Mortes (Autumn Leaves) performed by André Rieu choreo. by Sergei Komolov, Alexei Zhelezniakov; Milord by Marguerite Monnot	
2012–2013	Cornish Rhapsody by Hubert Bath	The Mission by Ennio Morricone	Hello by Lionel Richie
2011–2012	Winter by Antonio Vivaldi	Leningrad by William Joseph; Ange et Démon by Maxime Rodriguez	
2010–2011	Flamenco by unknown	The Sleeping Beauty by Pyotr Tchaikovsky	Caruso by Lucio Dalla performed by Luciano Pavarotti
2009–2010	Flamenco by unknown	The Sleeping Beauty by Pyotr Tchaikovsky	We Are the Champions by Queen
2008–2009	Korobushka (Russian folk music) performed by Bond	The Nutcracker by Pyotr Tchaikovsky	Pájaro Campana by Raúl Di Blasio

== Competitive highlights ==
(with Rogonov)

Results
International
Event	2007–08	2008–09	2009–10	2010–11	2011–12	2012–13	2013–14
GP Cup of China							7th
GP NHK Trophy						5th	7th
GP Rostelecom			7th			5th	
GP Skate Canada				WD			
Golden Spin			2nd	1st	1st		
Lombardia							2nd
Ondrej Nepela						1st	2nd
Warsaw Cup					1st		
International: Junior
Junior Worlds		2nd					
JGP Final		4th					
JGP Great Britain		1st					
JGP Mexico		3rd					
National
Russian Champ.		6th	9th	9th	3rd	6th	WD
Russian Junior	3rd	1st					
