= Ekaterina Petaikina =

Russian pair skater

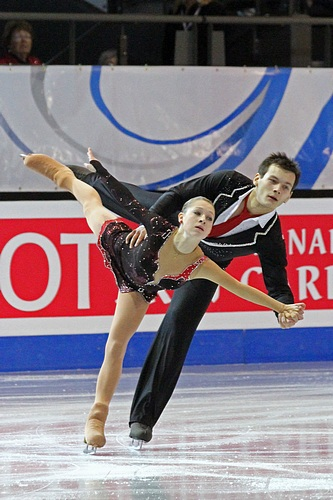

Personal information
- Full name: Ekaterina Igorevna Petaikina
- Born: 23 February 1995 (age 31) Moscow, Russia
- Height: 1.51 m (4 ft 11 1/2 in)

Figure skating career
- Country: Russia
- Coach: Artur Dmitriev
- Skating club: SDUSSHOR 37
- Began skating: 2000

Ekaterina Igorevna Petaikina (Russian: Екатерина Игоревна Петайкина; born 23 February 1995) is a Russian pair skater. With former partner Maxim Kurdyukov, she placed 6th at the 2012 Junior Worlds and is the 2012 Russian Junior silver medalist.

== Career ==
Petaikina/Kurdyukov began competing on the ISU Junior Grand Prix series in 2009. In the 2011–12 JGP season, they finished fourth in Latvia and won bronze in Austria. Their results qualified them for the 2011–12 Junior Grand Prix Final, where they placed fourth. Petaikina/Kurdyukov took the silver medal at the 2012 Russian Junior Championships and were sent to the 2012 World Junior Championships where they finished sixth. In May 2012, the pair ended their partnership.

Petaikina teamed up with Konstantin Bezmaternikh and skated with him for one season.

== Programs ==
(with Kurdyukov)

Season	Short program	Free skating
2011–2012	Sarabande by George Frideric Handel (modern arrangement)	Mr. & Mrs. Smith by John Powell

== Competitive highlights ==
=== With Bezmaternikh ===
National
Event	2012–13
Russian Championships	11th

=== With Kurdyukov ===
International
Event	08–09	09–10	10–11	11–12
World Junior Champ.				6th
JGP Final				4th
JGP Austria				3rd
JGP Czech Republic			5th	
JGP Germany		6th		
JGP Latvia				4th
National
Russian Championships		7th	8th	7th
Russian Junior Champ.	10th	4th	4th	2nd
JGP: Junior Grand Prix
