= Maxim Kurdyukov =

Russian pair skater

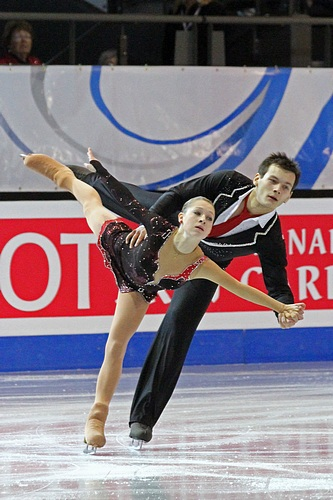
- Kurdyukov with Petaikina in 2011

Personal information
- Full name: Maxim Andreyevich Kurdyukov
- Born: 28 September 1990 (age 36) Ust-Kamenogorsk, Kazakh SSR, Soviet Union
- Height: 1.71 m (5 ft 7 1/2 in)

Figure skating career
- Partner: Brianna de la Mora
- Skating club: Texas Gulf Coast FSC
- Began skating: 2000

Maxim Andreyevich Kurdyukov (Russian: Максим Андреевич Курдюков; born 28 September 1990) is a Russian pair skater. With former partner Ekaterina Petaikina, he placed 6th at the 2012 Junior Worlds and is the 2012 Russian Junior silver medalist.

== Career ==
=== In Russia ===
Early in his pairs career, Kurdyukov competed with Alexandra Malakhova. By the 2008–09 season, he was skating with Ekaterina Petaikina. They made their ISU Junior Grand Prix debut in 2009. In the 2011–12 JGP season, the pair finished fourth in Latvia and won bronze in Austria. Their results qualified them for the 2011–12 Junior Grand Prix Final, where they placed fourth. Petaikina/Kurdyukov took the silver medal at the 2012 Russian Junior Championships and were sent to the 2012 World Junior Championships where they finished sixth. They parted ways in May 2012.

Later in 2012, Kurdyukov teamed up with Kristina Astakhova. Their partnership lasted two seasons.

=== In the United States ===
In 2015, he teamed up with U.S. skater Brianna de la Mora, with whom he trains at Texas Gulf Coast FSC in Sugar Land, Texas. They finished 8th at the 2016 U.S. Championships.

== Programs ==
=== With Astakhova ===
Season	Short program	Free skating
2013–2014	Inception by Hans Zimmer	Heart of Courage by Two Steps From Hell; Avatar by James Horner

=== With Petaikina ===
Season	Short program	Free skating
2011–2012	Sarabande by George Frideric Handel (modern arrangement)	Mr. & Mrs. Smith by John Powell

== Competitive highlights ==
=== With de la Mora ===
National
Event	2015–16
U.S. Championships	8th
Midwestern Sectionals	2nd

=== With Astakhova ===
International
Event	2012–13	2013–14
Ice Star		1st
National
Russian Championships	10th	9th

=== With Petaikina ===
International
Event	08–09	09–10	10–11	11–12
World Junior Champ.				6th
JGP Final				4th
JGP Austria				3rd
JGP Czech Republic			5th	
JGP Germany		6th		
JGP Latvia				4th
National
Russian Championships		7th	8th	7th
Russian Junior Champ.	10th	4th	4th	2nd
JGP: Junior Grand Prix

=== With Malakhova ===
National
Event	2006–07
Russian Junior Championships	9th
