= Vladislav Zhovnirski =

Russian figure skater

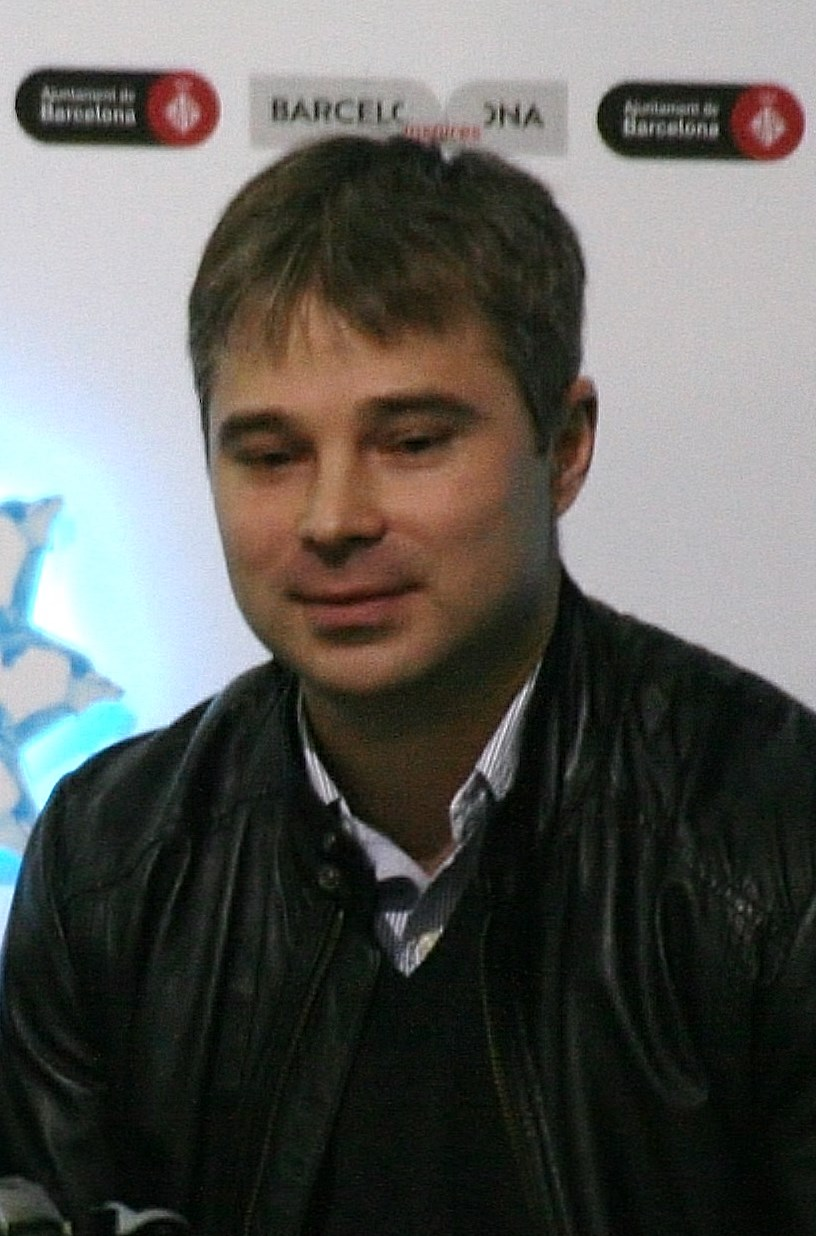
- Zhovnirski in December 2014

Personal information
- Native name: Владислав Владимирович Жовнирский
- Full name: Vladislav Vladimirovich Zhovnirski
- Born: 12 July 1978 (age 48) Kiev, Ukrainian SSR, Soviet Union

Figure skating career
- Country: Russia
Medal record
Representing Russia
Figure skating: Pairs
Winter Universiade
Gold medal – first place	1999 Žilina	Pairs
World Junior Championships
Gold medal – first place	1996 Brisbane	Pairs
Bronze medal – third place	1997 Seoul	Pairs
Bronze medal – third place	1998 Saint John	Pairs
Bronze medal – third place	1999 Zagreb	Pairs
Junior Grand Prix Final
Silver medal – second place	1997–98 Lausanne	Pairs
Bronze medal – third place	1998–99 Detroit	Pairs

Vladislav Vladimirovich Zhovnirski (Russian: Владислав Владимирович Жовнирский; born 12 July 1978) is a Russian pair skating coach and former competitor. With Victoria Maxiuta, he is the 1996 World Junior champion, 1997 Ondrej Nepela Memorial champion, 1998 Skate America bronze medalist, and 1999 Winter Universiade champion.

== Personal life ==
Zhovnirski was born 12 July 1978 in Kiev, Ukrainian SSR, Soviet Union. He lives in Moscow, Russia. He is married to Russian former pair skater Arina Ushakova, with whom he has a child (born c. 2016).

== Career ==
=== Partnership with Maxiuta ===
Zhovnirski competed for Russia and began appearing internationally with Victoria Maxiuta in 1993. They were awarded gold at the 1996 World Junior Championships, held from November to December 1995 in Brisbane, Australia.

The pair's first senior international medal, gold, came at the Ondrej Nepela Memorial in September 1996. Maxiuta/Zhovnirski went on to take bronze at the 1997 World Junior Championships, held in November 1996 in Seoul, South Korea; bronze at the 1998 World Junior Championships in December 1997 in Saint John, New Brunswick, Canada; and silver at the 1997–98 Junior Series Final in March 1998 in Lausanne, Switzerland.

Maxiuta/Zhovnirski began the 1998–99 season with gold medals at both of their Junior Grand Prix assignments – in Sofia, Bulgaria, and Chemnitz, Germany – before winning bronze at a senior Grand Prix event, the 1998 Skate America. In November 1998, the pair stepped onto the World Junior Championship podium for the fourth consecutive year, taking bronze in Zagreb, Croatia. In January 1999, they outscored Pang Qing / Tong Jian for gold at the Winter Universiade in Žilina, Slovakia. In March, they took bronze at the Junior Grand Prix Final in Detroit. The pair was coached by Nina Mozer.

=== Later career ===
From 2001 to 2003, Zhovnirski competed with Elena Ivanovich (also known as Jelena Jovanović) but finished no higher than 8th at the Russian Championships.

Following the end of his competitive career, he began working as a pairs coach in collaboration with Nina Mozer in Moscow. His students include 2012 JGP Final champions Lina Fedorova / Maxim Miroshkin and Ksenia Stolbova / Fedor Klimov (from mid-2013).

== Competitive highlights ==
GP: Grand Prix; JGP: Junior Grand Prix

=== With Ivanovich ===
National
Event	2001–02	2002–03
Russian Championships	8th	10th

=== With Maxiuta ===
International
Event	93–94	95–96	96–97	97–98	98–99
GP Skate America					3rd
Nebelhorn Trophy		9th		WD	
Nepela Memorial			1st		
Winter Universiade					1st
International: Junior
Junior Worlds		1st	3rd	3rd	3rd
JGP Final				2nd	3rd
JGP Bulgaria					1st
JGP Germany					1st
JGP Hungary				3rd	
JGP Slovakia				1st	
Blue Swords		3rd J	2nd		
St. Gervais			2nd		
Ukrainian Souvenir	6th J				
National
Russian Champ.		8th	7th		6th
WD: Withdrew
