= Lina Fedorova =

Russian pair skater

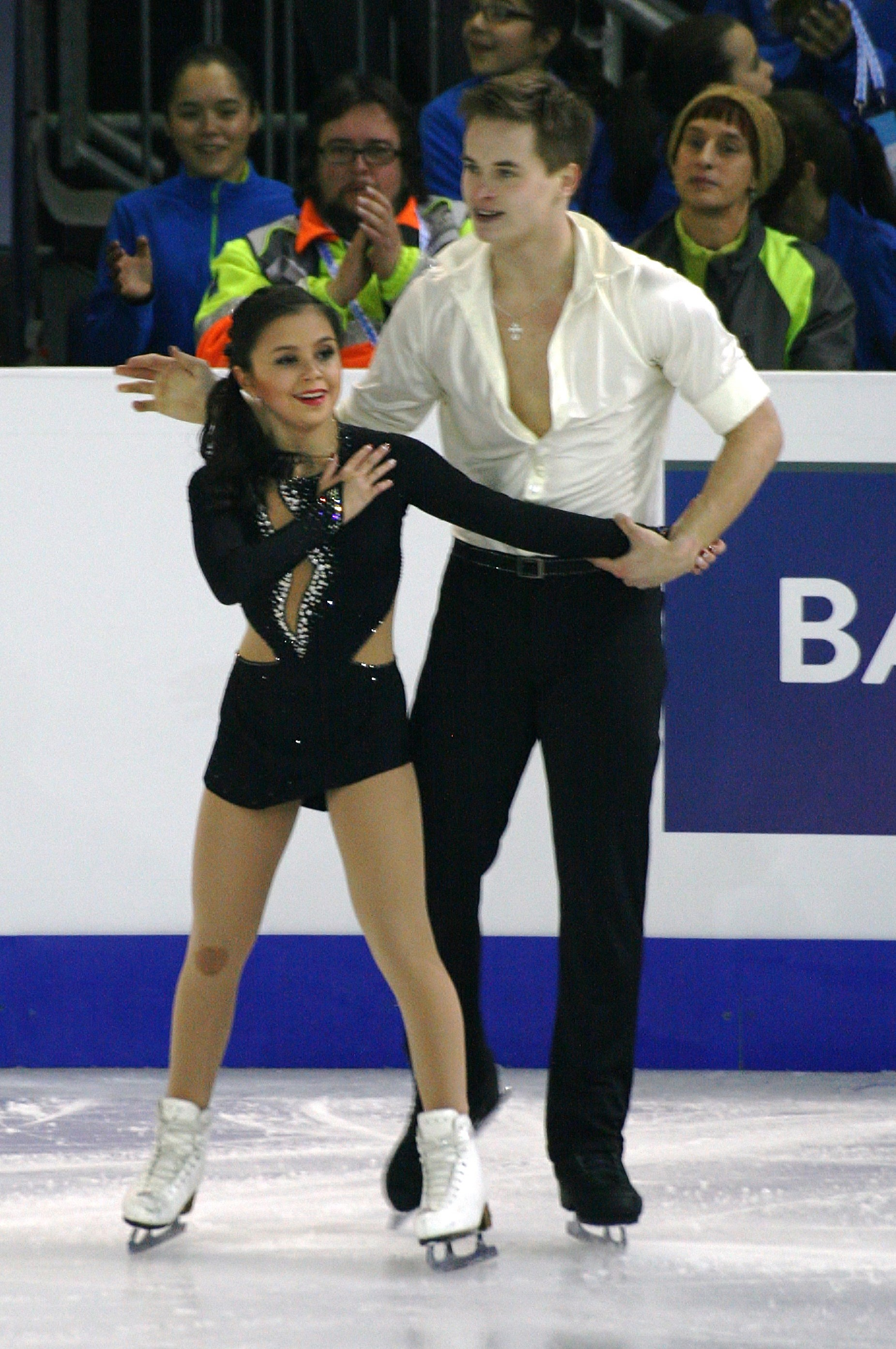
- Fedorova / Miroshkin at the 2014–15 JGP Final

Personal information
- Full name: Lina Alexeyevna Fedorova
- Born: 20 December 1997 (age 28) Moscow, Russia
- Height: 1.45 m (4 ft 9 in)

Figure skating career
- Country: Russia
- Partner: Maxim Miroshkin
- Coach: Vladislav Zhovnirski
- Skating club: Vorobievye Gory
- Began skating: 2002
Medal record
Representing Russia
Figure skating: Pairs
Winter Youth Olympics
| Silver medal – second place | 2012 Innsbruck | Pairs |
World Junior Championships
| Bronze medal – third place | 2015 Tallinn | Pairs |
| Bronze medal – third place | 2013 Milan | Pairs |
Junior Grand Prix Final
| Gold medal – first place | 2012–13 Sochi | Pairs |
| Silver medal – second place | 2014-15 Barcelona | Pairs |
| Bronze medal – third place | 2013–14 Fukuoka | Pairs |

Lina Alexeyevna Fedorova (Russian: Лина Алексеевна Фёдорова; born 20 December 1997) is a Russian pair skater. With partner Maxim Miroshkin, she is the two-time World Junior bronze medalist, 2012 JGP Final champion, 2012 Winter Youth Olympics silver medalist, and 2013 Russian Junior Champion.

== Personal life ==
Lina Alexeyevna Fedorova was born on 20 December 1997 in Moscow. Her younger sister, Lana, is also into figure skating.

== Career ==
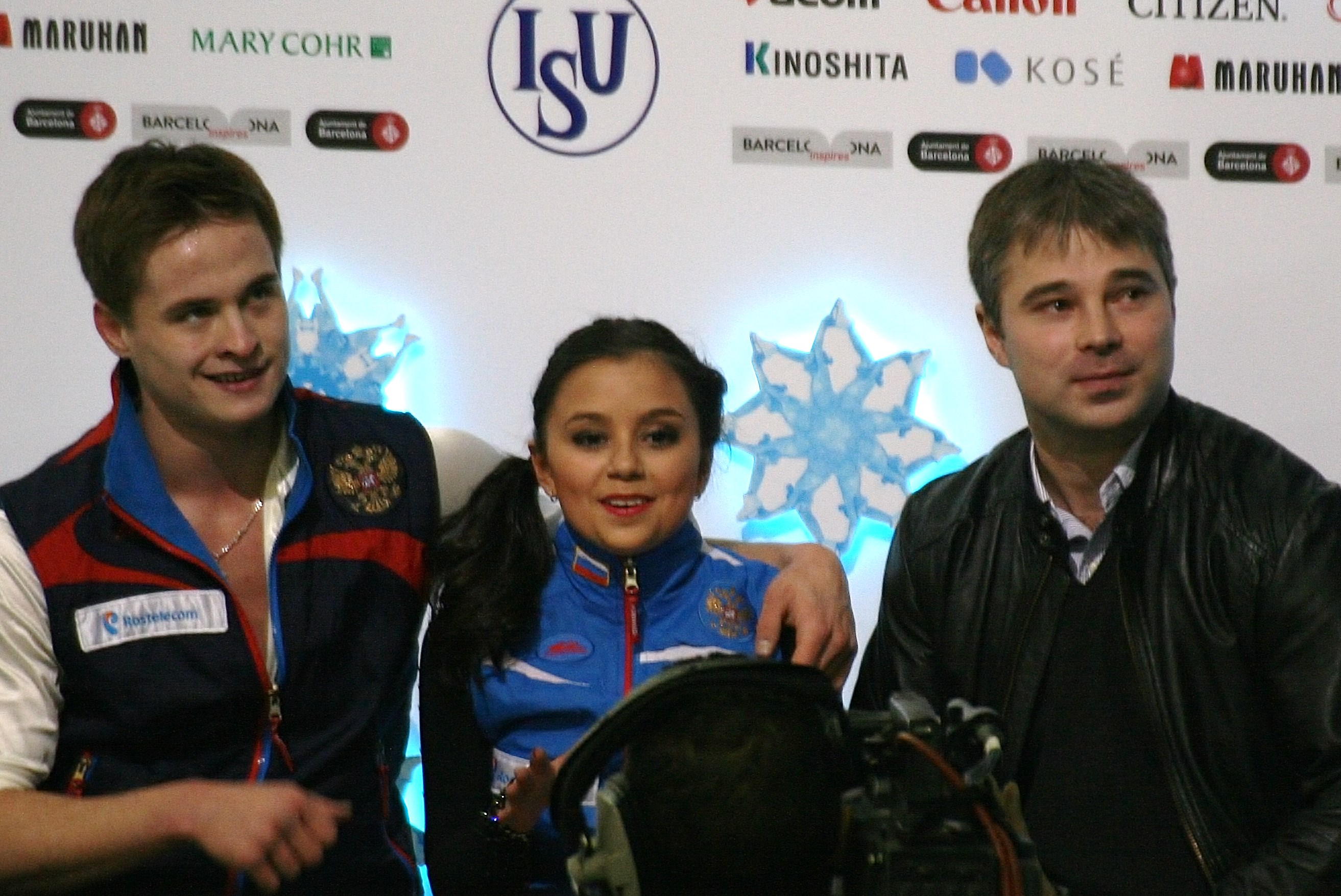
Fedorova and Miroshkin with coach Vladislav Zhovnirski at the 2014–15 JGP Final

Fedorova was introduced to figure skating by her grandmother at the age of four years. Initially a singles skater, she took up pair skating in 2009 with Maxim Miroshkin.

In the 2011–12 season, Fedorova/Miroshkin made their Junior Grand Prix debut, finishing 5th in Austria. They won the silver medal at the 2012 Winter Youth Olympics.

The following season, Fedorova/Miroshkin won silver and gold at their Junior Grand Prix events in Austria and Germany respectively, qualifying them for the JGP Final. After taking the junior gold medal at the 2012 Warsaw Cup, they competed at the JGP Final in Sochi, Russia, where they also won gold. Fedorova/Miroshkin finished 8th at their first senior Russian Championships and won the junior title. They won the bronze medal at the 2013 World Junior Championships after placing 7th in the short program but first in the free skate.

In 2013–14, Fedorova/Miroshkin started their season by winning silver at the 2013 JGP Slovakia, behind teammates Maria Vigalova / Egor Zakroev. They won gold at their next event, the 2013 JGP Czech Republic. Their results qualified them to the JGP Final in Fukuoka, Japan. At the final, Fedorova/Miroshkin placed second in the short program and third in the free skate, winning the bronze medal behind Vigalova/Zakroev. At the Russian Championships, the pair finished sixth on the senior level and fourth on the junior level.

In the 2014–15 Junior Grand Prix, Fedorova/Miroshkin were assigned at the 2014 JGP Czech Rep. where they finished 2nd to Canadians Julianne Séguin / Charlie Bilodeau. In their next event, they won another silver medal qualifying them to their third ISU JGP Final held in Barcelona, Spain. In the finals, they won the silver medal with a total of 165.78 points. They then competed at the 2015 World Junior Championships and won the bronze medal.

=== Senior ===
In the 2015–16 season, Fedorova/Miroshkin were to debut as full seniors. However; Miroshkin sustained a torn meniscus injury and withdraw from their Grand Prix assignment at the 2015 Cup of China. They decided to sit out for the rest of the season for Miroshkin's rehabilitation from his surgery.

== Skating technique ==
Fedorova/Miroshkin are one of the few pair skaters that can do side-by-side (SBS) Biellmann spins.

== Programs ==
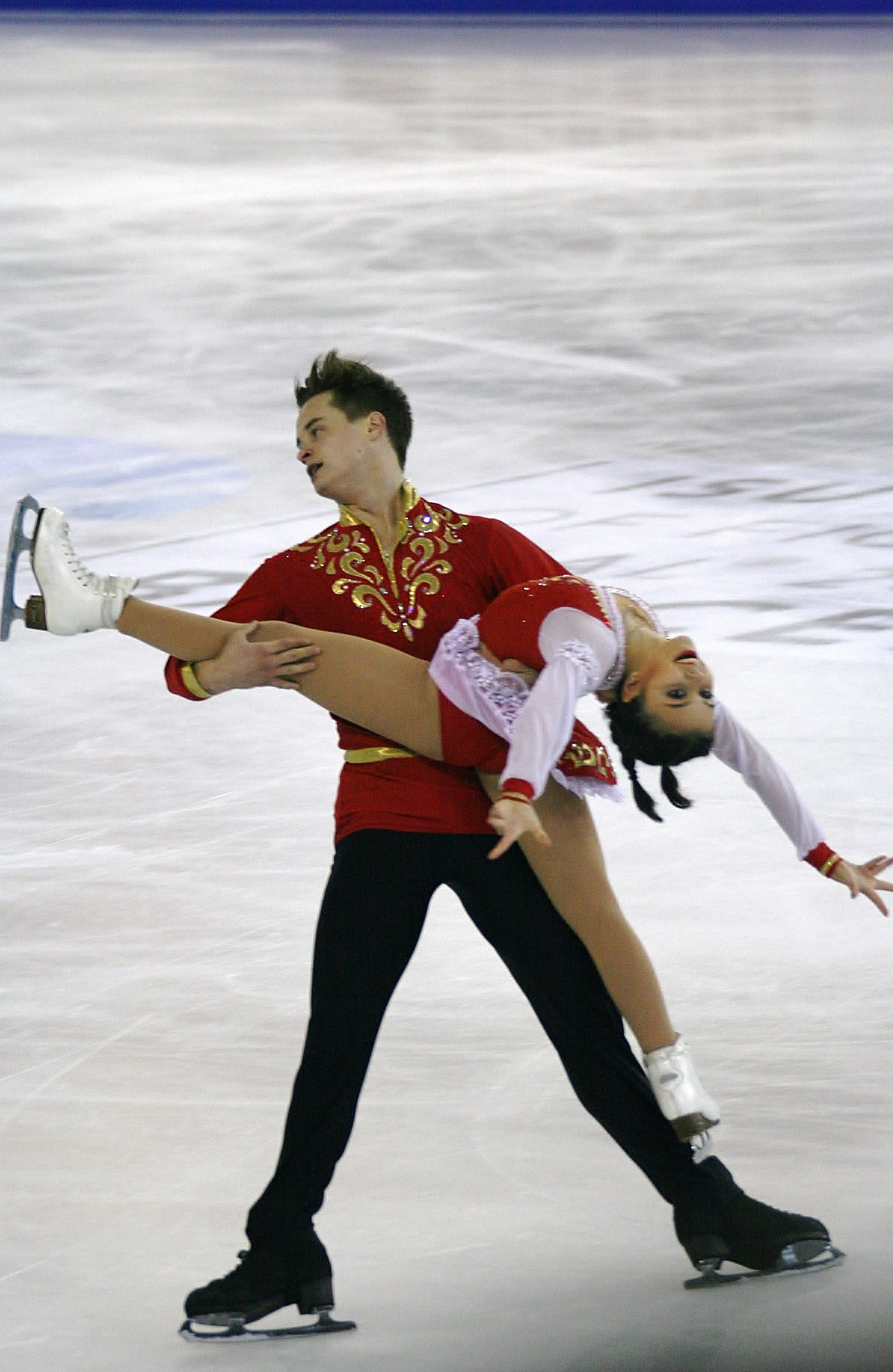
Fedorova and Miroshkin doing a pairs spread eagle variation at the 2014–15 JGP Final

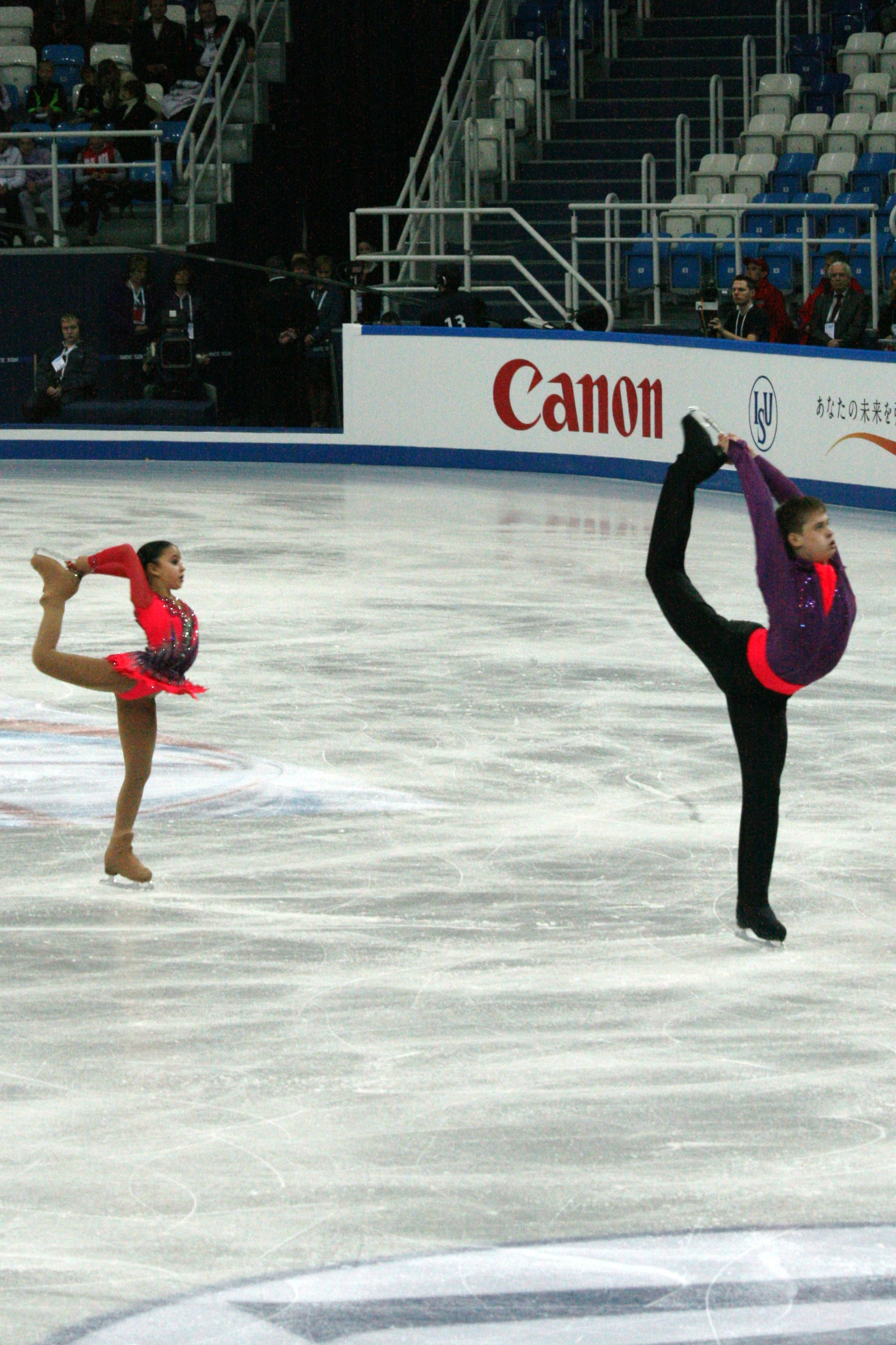
Fedorova and Miroshkin doing side-by-side (SBS) Biellmann spins

(with Miroshkin)

| Season | Short program | Free skating | Exhibition |
|---|---|---|---|
| 2014–2015 | Feeling Good by Michael Bublé | Korobushko by Bond | Money, Money (from Cabaret) performed by Liza Minnelli |
| 2013–2014 | Clowns and Kids Suite by Alfred Schnittke | Cabaret by Liza Minnelli | Song of Basilio the Cat and Alisa the Fox (from Buratino) |
| 2012–2013 | Singin' in the Rain by Nacio Herb Brown | Hernando's Hideaway (from The Pajama Game) by Jerry Ross | Circus medley |
| 2011–2012 | Singin' in the Rain by Nacio Herb Brown | Circus medley by ? | |

== Competitive highlights ==
CS: Challenger Series (began in the 2014–15 season); JGP: Junior Grand Prix

With Miroshkin

International
| Event | 2010–11 | 2011–12 | 2012–13 | 2013–14 | 2014–15 | 2015–16 |
|---|---|---|---|---|---|---|
| GP Cup of China | | | | | | WD |
| CS Ice Challenge | | 1st J. | | | 1st | |
| CS Warsaw Cup | | | 1st J. | 2nd | 2nd | |
International: Junior
| Youth Olympics | | 2nd | | | | |
| Junior Worlds | | | 3rd | | 3rd | |
| JGP Final | | | 1st | 3rd | 2nd | |
| JGP Austria | | 5th | 2nd | | | |
| JGP Czech Rep. | | | | 1st | 2nd | |
| JGP Germany | | | 1st | | 2nd | |
| JGP Slovakia | | | | 2nd | | |
| NRW Trophy | | 1st J. | | | | |
| Printemps | | | 1st J. | | | |
National
| Russian Champ. | | | 8th | 6th | | |
| Russian Junior | 11th | | 1st | 4th | 2nd | |
