= Ivan Bich =

Russian pair skater

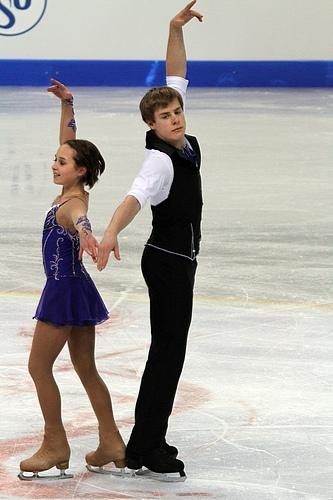
- Gainetdinova/Bich at 2012 Junior Worlds

Personal information
- Full name: Ivan Igorevich Bich
- Born: 14 February 1993 (age 33) Saint Petersburg, Russia
- Height: 1.70 m (5 ft 7 in)

Figure skating career
- Country: Russia
- Coach: Natalia Pavlova; Artur Dmitriev
- Skating club: SDUSHOR St. Petersburg
- Began skating: 2000

Ivan Igorevich Bich (Russian: Иван Игоревич Бич; born 14 February 1993) is a Russian pair skater. With former partner Kamilla Gainetdinova, he is the 2013 JGP Belarus champion and a two-time (2012, 2013) Russian junior national bronze medalist.

== Personal life ==
Ivan Igorevich Bich was born 14 February 1993 in Saint Petersburg, Russia. His father, Igor, is a former pair skater and an ISU technical specialist.

== Career ==
Bich initially trained as a singles skater, coached by Alla Piatova. He last competed in singles in September 2010, winning the junior bronze medal at the first stage of the Russian Cup series. He decided to begin training as a pairs skater. In May 2011, Bich formed a partnership with Kamilla Gainetdinova, who until then was a Moscow-based singles skater. Gainetdinova moved to Saint Petersburg to train with him. They were coached by Oksana Kazakova in their first two seasons together.

Gainetdinova/Bich made their international debut at the 2011 Warsaw Cup, winning the junior bronze medal. They won bronze at the 2012 Russian Junior Championships. In the free skate, Gainetdinova/Bich landed SBS 3Lz, receiving 6.70 points for the element. They also included a SBS 3Lo+2A sequence after the halfway point, receiving 5.99 points due to some negative grades of execution. They were assigned to the 2012 World Junior Championships, where they finished 11th.

In their second season, Gainetdinova/Bich debuted on the ISU Junior Grand Prix series. They were 7th at their first event in Lake Placid, New York. At the 2012 JGP Croatia, they landed a SBS 3LZ+2T combination in the free skate, as well as upgrading their twist to a triple for the first time. They are the first pair to land the combination in a junior competition. Gainetdinova/Bich finished 4th at the event. They won bronze at the 2013 Russian Junior Championships with a free skate that included a SBS 3Lz+2T combination at the start of the program and SBS 3T after the halfway mark. They finished 8th at the 2013 World Junior Championships.

In spring 2013, Gainetdinova/Bich moved to Moscow and joined Natalia Pavlova and Artur Dmitriev. Beginning their third season with gold at the 2013 JGP Belarus, the pair then won the bronze medal at the 2013 JGP Czech Republic. Their results qualified them to the JGP Final in Fukuoka, Japan. At the final, Gainetdinova/Bich placed sixth in both segments and overall. Their partnership ended in early 2014.

== Programs ==
(with Gainetdinova)

Season	Short program	Free skating	Exhibition
2013–2014	Mack and Mabel Overture by Jerry Herman	Princess of the Circus by Emmerich Kálmán	
2012–2013	Yablochko (from The Red Poppy) by Reinhold Glière	Die Fledermaus by Johann Strauss II	
2011–2012	I Could Have Danced All Night (from My Fair Lady) by Frederick Loewe	Die Fledermaus by Johann Strauss II	

== Competitive highlights ==
=== Pair skating with Gainetdinova ===
International
Event	2011–12	2012–13	2013–14
World Junior Champ.	11th	8th	
JGP Final			6th
JGP Belarus			1st
JGP Croatia		4th	
JGP Czech Republic			3rd
JGP United States		7th	
Toruń Cup		1st J.	
Warsaw Cup	3rd J.		
National
Russian Junior Champ.	3rd	3rd	5th
J. = Junior level

=== Single skating ===
International
Event	2008–09	2009–10
Warsaw Cup		1st J.
National
Russian Junior Champ.	14th	12th
J. = Junior level
