= Maxim Miroshkin =

Russian pair skater

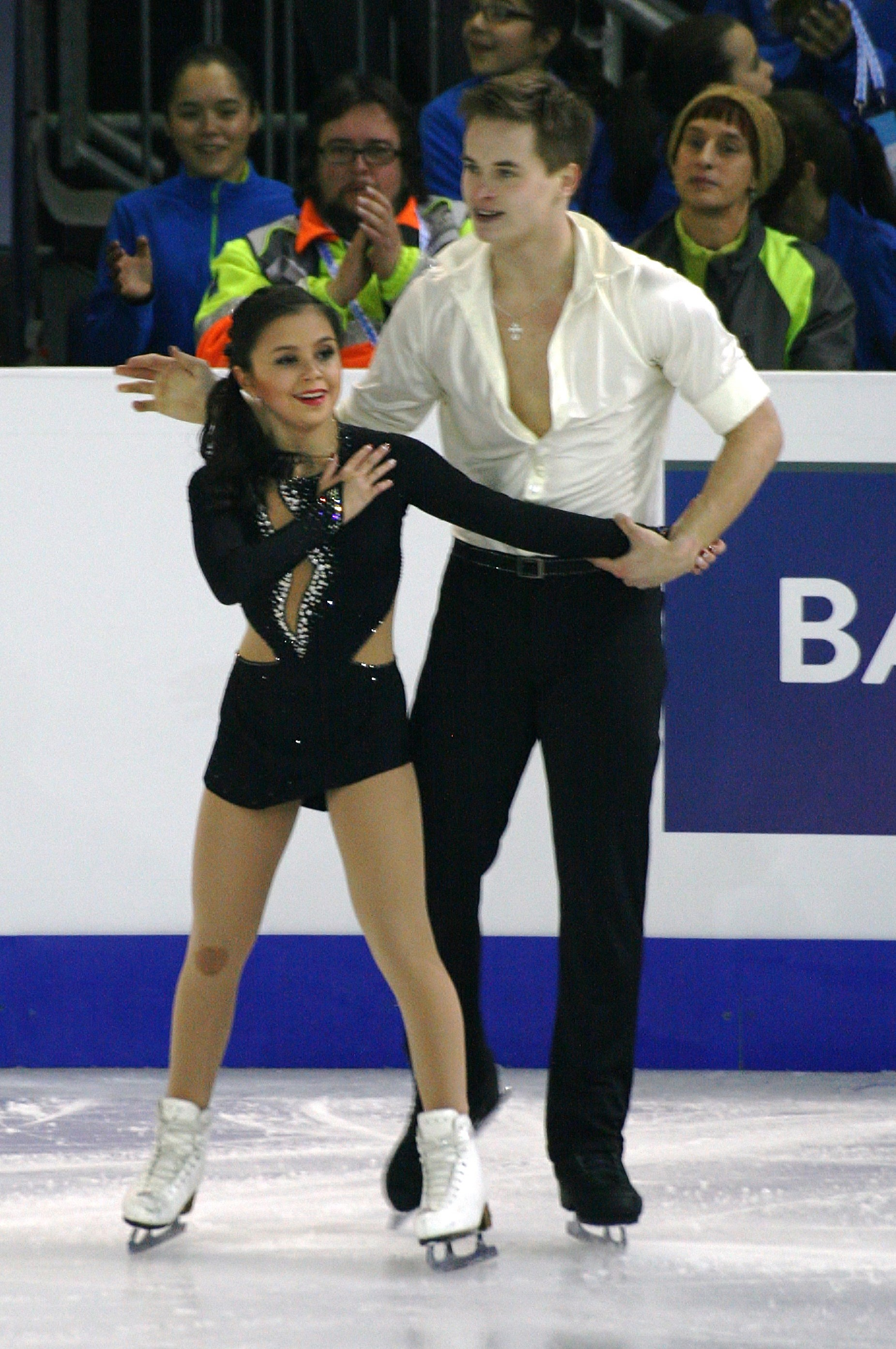
- Fedorova / Miroshkin at the 2014–15 JGP Final

Personal information
- Full name: Maxim Romanovich Miroshkin
- Born: 22 May 1994 (age 32) Yekaterinburg, Russia
- Height: 1.79 m (5 ft 10 1/2 in)

Figure skating career
- Country: Russia
- Partner: Lina Fedorova
- Coach: Vladislav Zhovnirski
- Skating club: Vorobievye Gory
Medal record
Representing Russia
Figure skating: Pairs
Winter Youth Olympics
Silver medal – second place	2012 Innsbruck	Pairs
World Junior Championships
Bronze medal – third place	2015 Tallinn	Pairs
Bronze medal – third place	2013 Milan	Pairs
Junior Grand Prix Final
Gold medal – first place	2012–13 Sochi	Pairs
Silver medal – second place	2014-15 Barcelona	Pairs
Bronze medal – third place	2013–14 Fukuoka	Pairs

Maxim Romanovich Miroshkin (Russian: Максим Романович Мирошкин; born 22 May 1994) is a Russian pair skater. With partner Lina Fedorova, he is a two-time World Junior bronze medalist, the 2012 JGP Final champion, 2012 Winter Youth Olympics silver medalist, and 2013 Russian Junior Champion.

== Personal life ==
Maxim Romanovich Miroshkin was born on 22 May 1994 in Yekaterinburg. He collects flags from different countries. He has a younger brother named Mikhail.

== Career ==
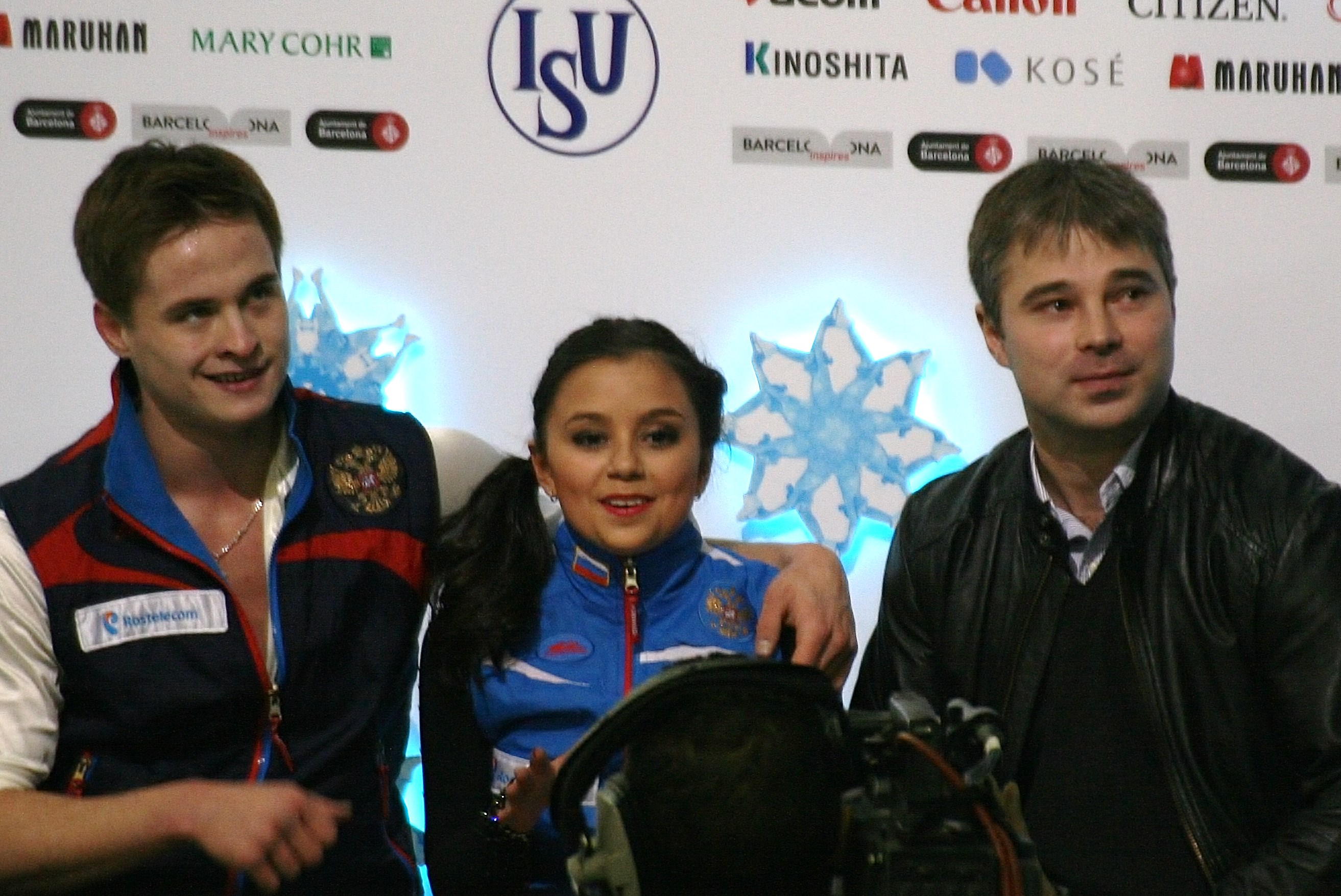
Fedorova and Miroshkin with coach Vladislav Zhovnirski at the 2014–15 JGP Final

Miroshkin was introduced to figure skating by his grandmother at a local rink in Yekaterinburg, where he skated until it was closed down. He briefly trained as a hockey player before returning to figure skating. He switched from singles to pairs in 2009, teaming up with Lina Fedorova.

In the 2011–12 season, Fedorova/Miroshkin made their Junior Grand Prix debut, finishing 5th in Austria. They won the silver medal at the 2012 Winter Youth Olympics.

The following season, Fedorova/Miroshkin won silver and gold at their Junior Grand Prix events in Austria and Germany respectively, qualifying them for the JGP Final. After taking the junior gold medal at the 2012 Warsaw Cup, they competed at the JGP Final in Sochi, Russia, where they also won gold. Fedorova/Miroshkin finished 8th at their first senior Russian Championships and won the junior title. They won the bronze medal at the 2013 World Junior Championships after placing 7th in the short program but first in the free skate.

In 2013–14, Fedorova/Miroshkin started their season by winning silver at the 2013 JGP Slovakia, behind teammates Maria Vigalova / Egor Zakroev. They won gold at their next event, the 2013 JGP Czech Republic. Their results qualified them to the JGP Final in Fukuoka, Japan. At the final, Fedorova/Miroshkin placed second in the short program and third in the free skate, winning the bronze medal behind Vigalova/Zakroev. At the Russian Championships, the pair finished sixth on the senior level and fourth on the junior level.

In the 2014–15 Junior Grand Prix, Fedorova/Miroshkin were assigned at the 2014 JGP Czech Rep. where they finished 2nd to Canadians Julianne Séguin / Charlie Bilodeau. In their next event, they won another silver medal qualifying them to their third ISU JGP Final held in Barcelona, Spain. In the finals, they won the silver medal with a total of 165.78 points. They then competed at the 2015 World Junior Championships and won the bronze medal.

=== Senior ===
In the 2015-16 season, Fedorova/Miroshkin were to debut as full seniors. However; Miroshkin sustained a torn meniscus injury and withdraw from their Grand Prix assignment at the 2015 Cup of China. They decided to sit out for the rest of the season for Miroshkin's rehabilitation from his surgery.

== Skating technique ==
Fedorova/Miroshkin are one of the few pair skaters that can do side-by-side (SBS) Biellmann spins.

== Programs ==
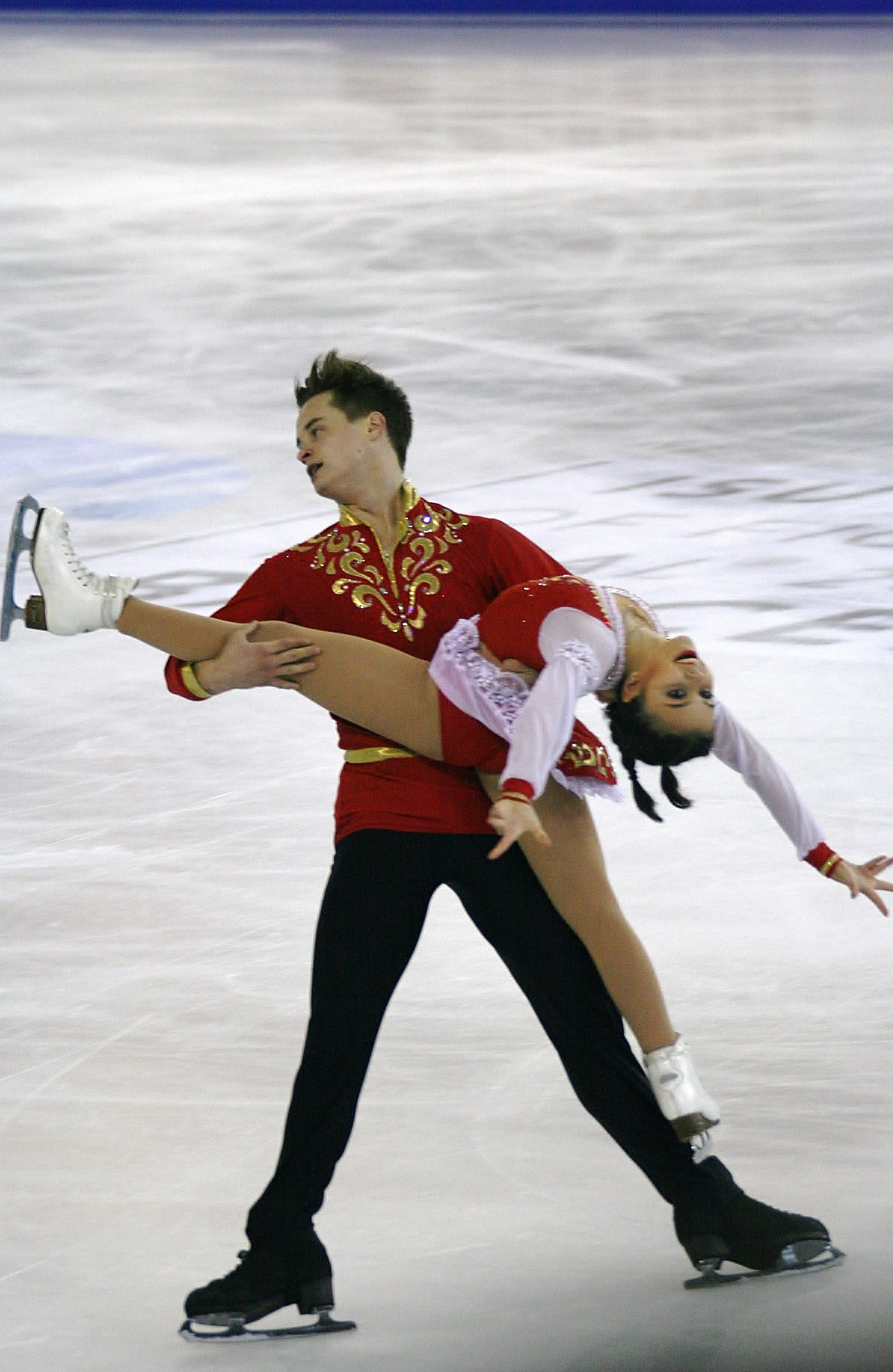
Fedorova and Miroshkin doing a pairs spread eagle variation at the 2014–15 JGP Final

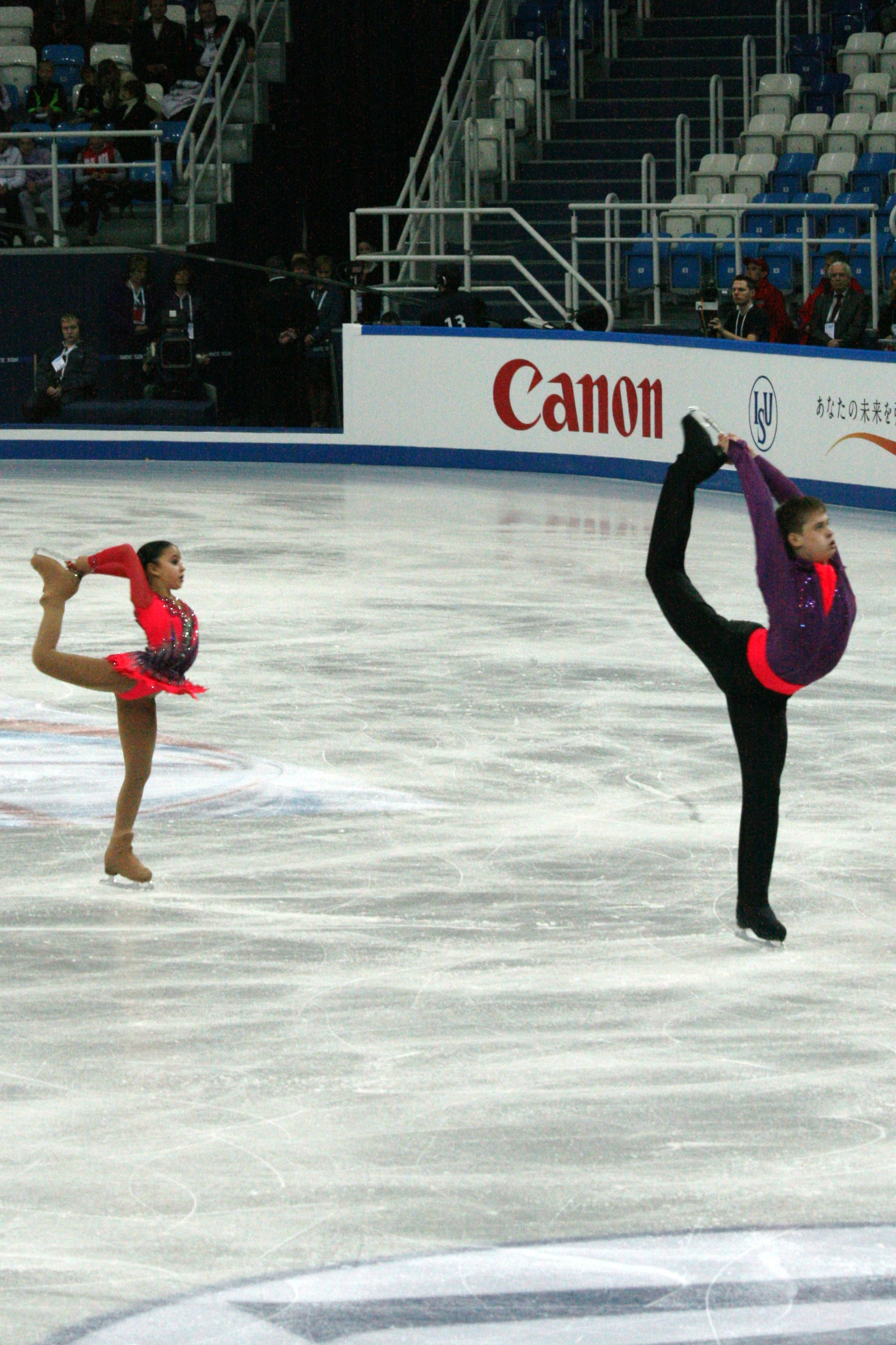
Fedorova and Miroshkin doing side-by-side (SBS) Biellmann spins

(with Fedorova)

Season	Short program	Free skating	Exhibition
2014–2015	Feeling Good by Michael Bublé	Korobushko by Bond	Money, Money (from Cabaret) performed by Liza Minnelli
2013–2014	Clowns and Kids Suite by Alfred Schnittke	Cabaret by Liza Minnelli	Song of Basilio the Cat and Alisa the Fox (from Buratino)
2012–2013	Singin' in the Rain by Nacio Herb Brown	Hernando's Hideaway (from The Pajama Game) by Jerry Ross	Circus medley
2011–2012	Singin' in the Rain by Nacio Herb Brown	Circus medley by ?	

== Competitive highlights ==
CS: Challenger Series (began in the 2014–15 season); JGP: Junior Grand Prix

With Fedorova

International
Event	2010–11	2011–12	2012–13	2013–14	2014–15	2015–16
GP Cup of China						WD
CS Ice Challenge		1st J.			1st	
CS Warsaw Cup			1st J.	2nd	2nd	
International: Junior
Youth Olympics		2nd				
Junior Worlds			3rd		3rd	
JGP Final			1st	3rd	2nd	
JGP Austria		5th	2nd			
JGP Czech Rep.				1st	2nd	
JGP Germany			1st		2nd	
JGP Slovakia				2nd		
NRW Trophy		1st J.				
Printemps			1st J.			
National
Russian Champ.			8th	6th		
Russian Junior	11th		1st	4th	2nd	
