= List of highest historical junior scores in figure skating =

Figure skating records and statistics

Medal records
- Olympic Games; World Championships; European Championships; Four Continents Championships; Grand Prix of Figure Skating; Other events
- Grand Slam; Junior Grand Slam; Golden Slam; Junior Golden Slam; Super Slam

Highest scores statistics
- Current senior; Current junior; Historical senior; Historical junior

Other records and statistics
- ISU World Standings and Season's World Ranking

The following list of highest historical junior scores in figure skating contains the highest junior scores earned before the 2018–19 season under the ISU Judging System (IJS). The 2018–19 season began on July 1, 2018.

After being tested in 2003, the IJS replaced the old 6.0 system in the 2004–05 figure skating season. Up to and including the 2017–18 season, the Grade of Execution (GOE) scoring system for each program element ranged between -3 and +3. Beginning with the 2018–19 season, the GOE was expanded to a range between -5 and +5. Hence, the International Skating Union (ISU) restarted all records beginning with the 2018–19 season and all previous statistics were marked as "historical". Accordingly, this page lists only the highest scores achieved before the 2018–19 season, using the -3/+3 GOE scoring range.

The following lists are included:

- Records: current junior record holders; technical and component record scores; progression of junior record scores
- Personal bests: highest personal best scores; highest personal best technical element scores; highest personal best program component scores
- Absolute bests: lists of absolute best scores

Note: In the case of personal best lists, only one score is listed for any one skater, i.e. their personal best. The absolute best lists may include more than one score for the same skater.

The ISU only recognizes the best scores that are set at international competitions run under the ISU's rules, and does not recognize, for example, scores that are obtained at national figure skating championships. The junior competitions recognized by the ISU are: the Winter Youth Olympics, the World Junior Championships, and Junior Grand Prix competitions.

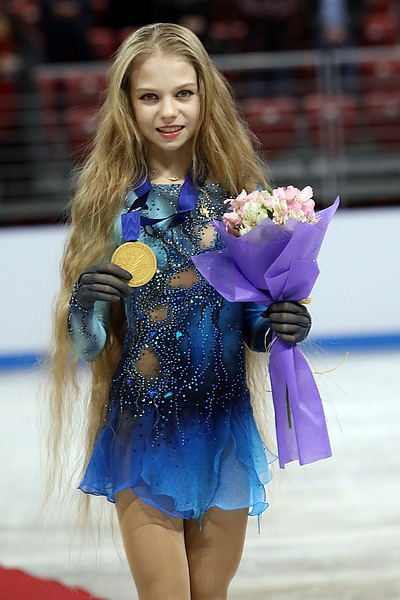
Alexandra Trusova was the record holder for the junior women's combined total, short program, and free skate scores before the 2018–19 season.

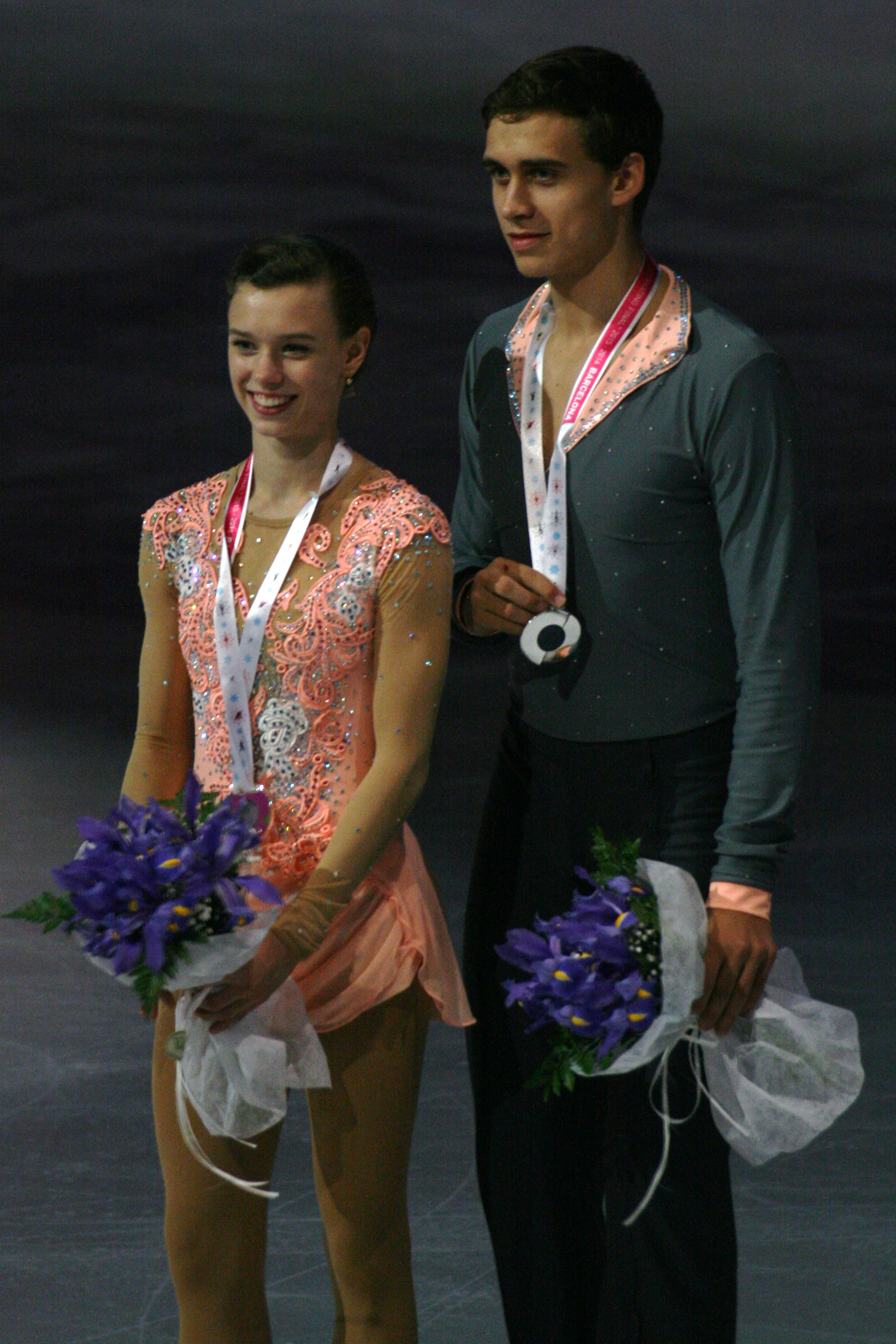
Anna Dušková and Martin Bidař were the record holders for the junior pairs' combined total score before the 2018–19 season.

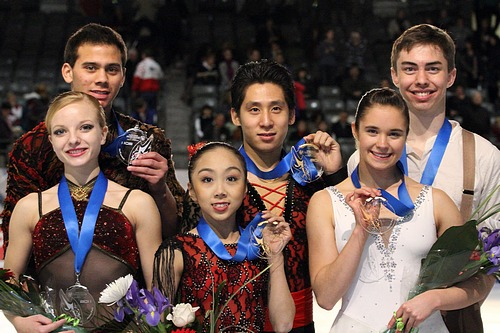
Sui Wenjing and Han Cong were the record holders for the junior pairs' free skate score before the 2018–19 season.

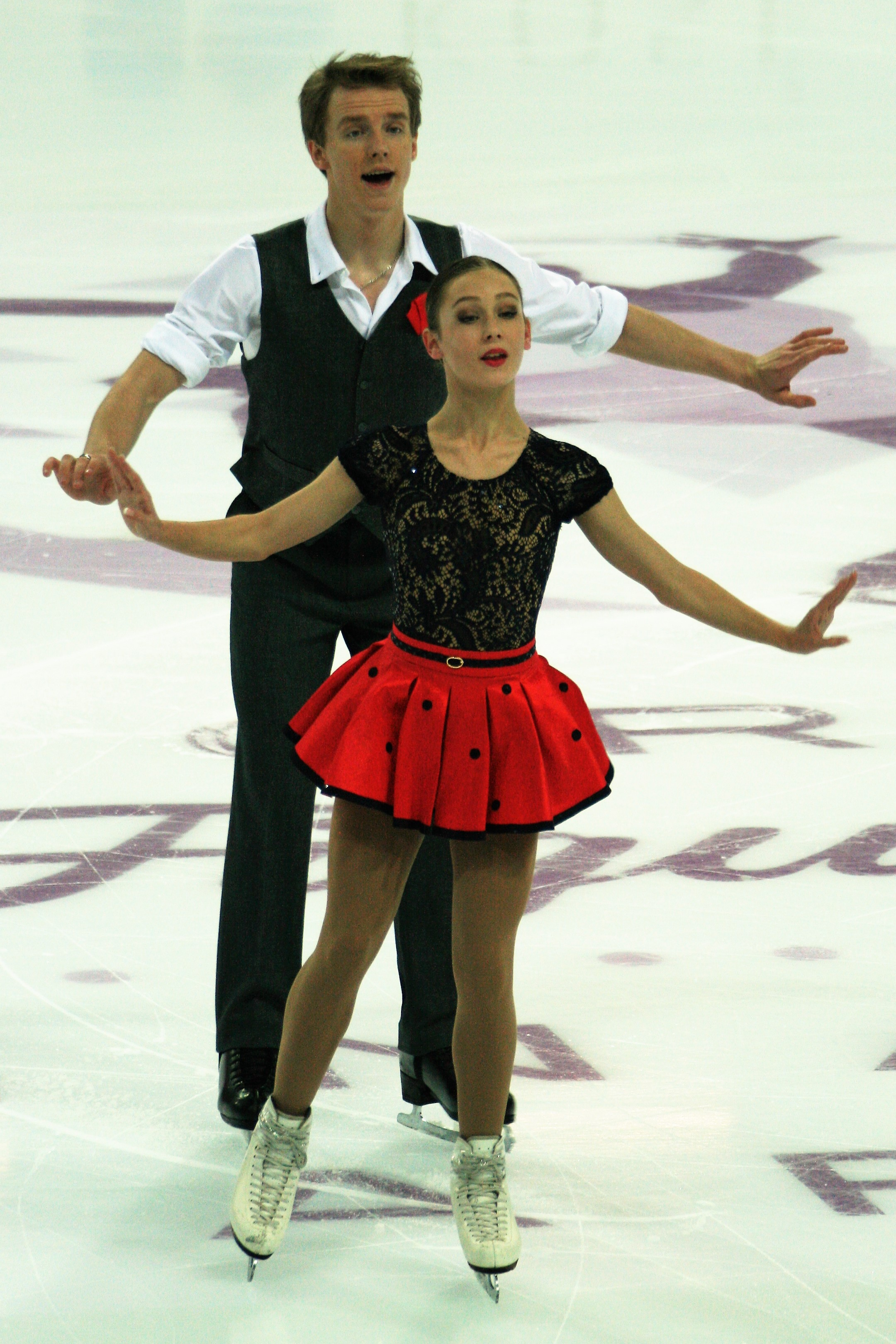
Amina Atakhanova and Ilia Spiridonov were the record holders for the junior pairs' short program score before the 2018–19 season.

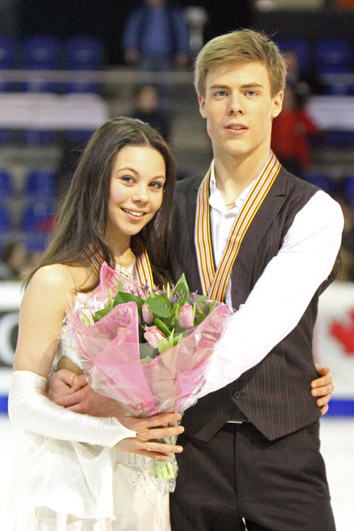
Elena Ilinykh and Nikita Katsalapov were the junior record holders of the original dance score. At the time, they were also the record holders of free dance and combined total scores.

== Junior record holders ==
=== Men's singles ===
Men's singles junior record holders
Component	Skater	Nation	Score	Event
Short program	Shoma Uno	Japan	84.87	2015 World Junior Championships
Free skating	Vincent Zhou	United States	179.24	2017 World Junior Championships
Combined total	Vincent Zhou	United States	258.11	2017 World Junior Championships

=== Women's singles ===
Women's singles junior record holders
Component	Skater	Nation	Score	Event
Short program	Alexandra Trusova	Russia	73.25	2017–18 Junior Grand Prix Final
Free skating	Alexandra Trusova	Russia	153.49	2018 World Junior Championships
Combined total	Alexandra Trusova	Russia	225.52	2018 World Junior Championships

=== Pairs ===
Pairs junior record holders
Component	Skater	Nation	Score	Event
Short program	Amina Atakhanova; Ilia Spiridonov	Russia	64.79	2016 JGP Estonia
Free skating	Sui Wenjing; Han Cong	China	118.54	2011 JGP Austria
Combined total	Anna Dušková; Martin Bidař	Czech Republic	181.82	2016 World Junior Championships

=== Ice dance (2011–18) ===
Ice dance (2011–18) junior record holders
Component	Skater	Nation	Score	Event
Short dance	Rachel Parsons; Michael Parsons	United States	67.88	2016 World Junior Championships
Free dance	Rachel Parsons; Michael Parsons	United States	97.54	2017 World Junior Championships
Combined total	Rachel Parsons; Michael Parsons	United States	164.83	2017 World Junior Championships

=== Ice dance (2003–10) ===
Prior to the 2010–11 season, ice dance competitions included a compulsory dance and original dance (there was no short dance).

Ice dance (2003–10) junior record holders
Component	Skater	Nation	Score	Event
Compulsory dance	Morgan Matthews; Maxim Zavozin	United States	39.89	2005 World Junior Championships
Original dance	Elena Ilinykh; Nikita Katsalapov	Russia	59.94	2010 World Junior Championships
Free dance	Elena Ilinykh; Nikita Katsalapov	Russia	90.82	2010 World Junior Championships
Combined total	Elena Ilinykh; Nikita Katsalapov	Russia	188.28	2010 World Junior Championships

== Technical and component record scores ==
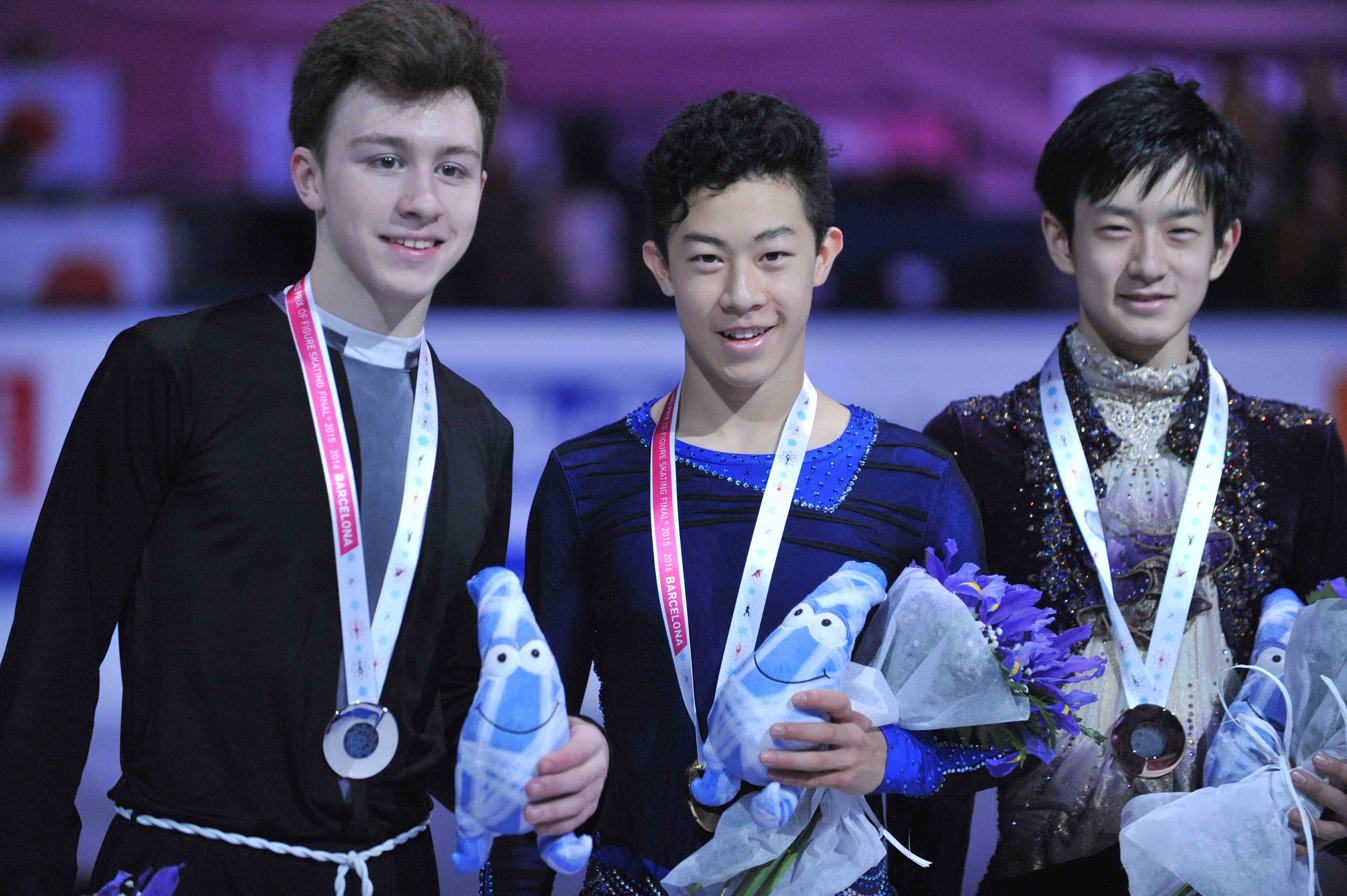
Dmitri Aliev was the record holder for the junior men's PCS records before the 2018–19 season.

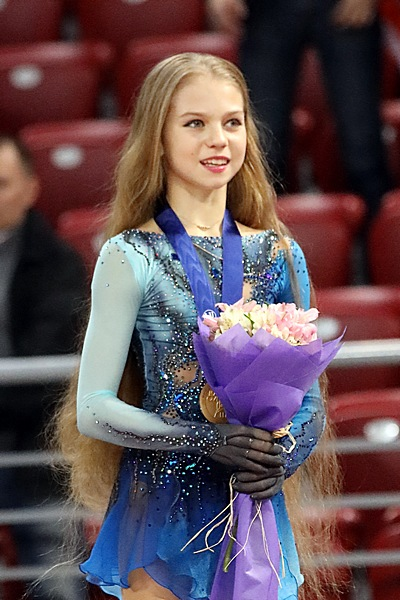
Alexandra Trusova was the record holder for junior women's TES records and short program PCS record before the 2018–19 season.

TES = Technical Element Score
PCS = Program Component Score

=== Men's singles ===
Top technical and component scores in men's singles
Component		Skater	Nation	Score	Event
Short program	TES	Shoma Uno	Japan	46.81	2015 World Junior Championships
Short program	PCS	Dmitri Aliev	Russia	38.97	2017 World Junior Championships
Free skating	TES	Vincent Zhou	United States	104.66	2017 World Junior Championships
Free skating	PCS	Dmitri Aliev	Russia	79.58	2017 World Junior Championships

=== Women's singles ===
Top technical and component scores in women's singles
Component		Skater	Nation	Score	Event
Short program	TES	Alexandra Trusova	Russia	42.96	2017–18 Junior Grand Prix Final
Short program	PCS	Alexandra Trusova	Russia	30.29	2017–18 Junior Grand Prix Final
Free skating	TES	Alexandra Trusova	Russia	92.35	2018 World Junior Championships
Free skating	PCS	Alina Zagitova	Russia	62.67	2016–17 Junior Grand Prix Final

=== Pairs ===
Top technical and component scores in pair skating
Component		Skater	Nation	Score	Event
Short program	TES	Amina Atakhanova; Ilia Spiridonov	Russia	38.81	2016 JGP Estonia
Short program	PCS	Yu Xiaoyu; Jin Yang	China	28.92	2015 World Junior Championships
Free skating	TES	Sui Wenjing; Han Cong	China	62.76	2011 JGP Austria
Free skating	PCS	Julianne Séguin; Charlie Bilodeau	Canada	59.25	2014–15 Junior Grand Prix Final

=== Ice dance ===
Top technical and component scores in ice dance
Component		Skater	Nation	Score	Event
Short dance	TES	Kaitlin Hawayek; Jean-Luc Baker	United States	36.86	2014 World Junior Championships
Short dance	PCS	Alla Loboda; Pavel Drozd	Russia	32.72	2016–17 Junior Grand Prix Final
Free dance	TES	Lorraine McNamara; Quinn Carpenter	United States	47.85	2016 World Junior Championships
Free dance	PCS	Rachel Parsons; Michael Parsons	United States	50.27	2017 World Junior Championships

== Highest personal best scores ==
The following lists include only personal best scores of skaters. To see lists where multiple scores from the same skater are included, see absolute best scores.

=== Men's singles ===
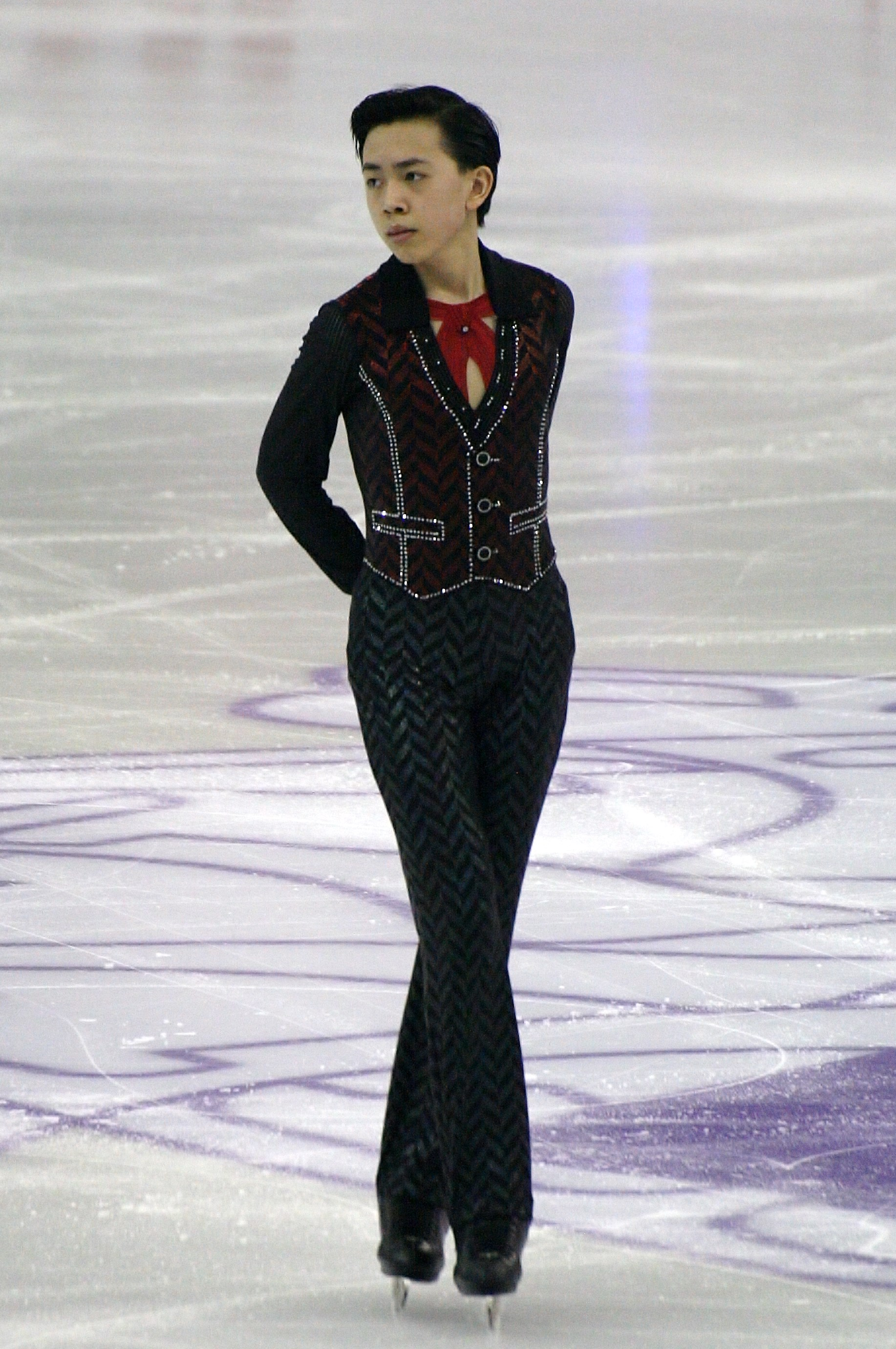
Vincent Zhou was the junior record holder for the combined total and free skate scores.

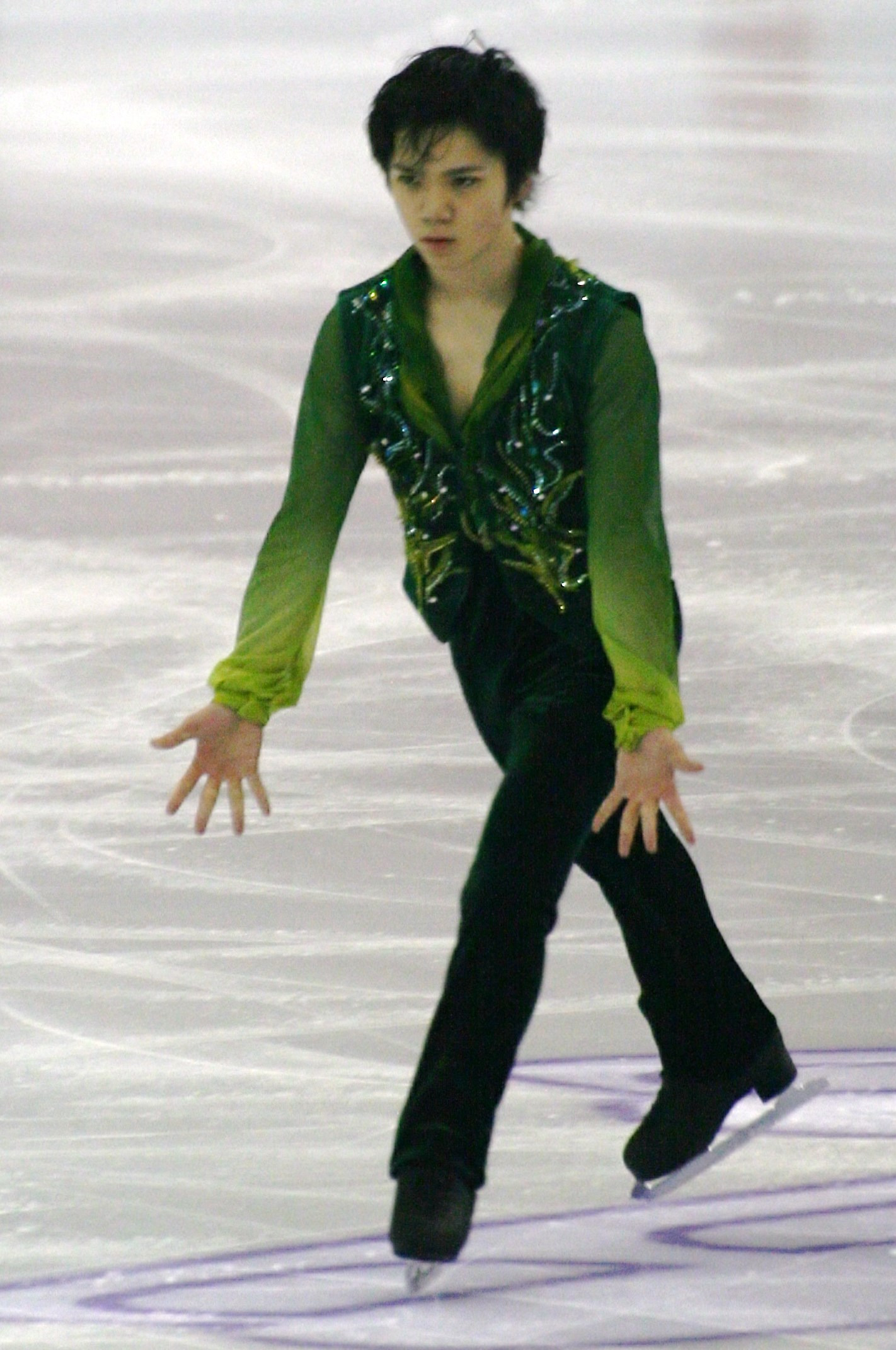
Shoma Uno was the junior record holder for the short program score.

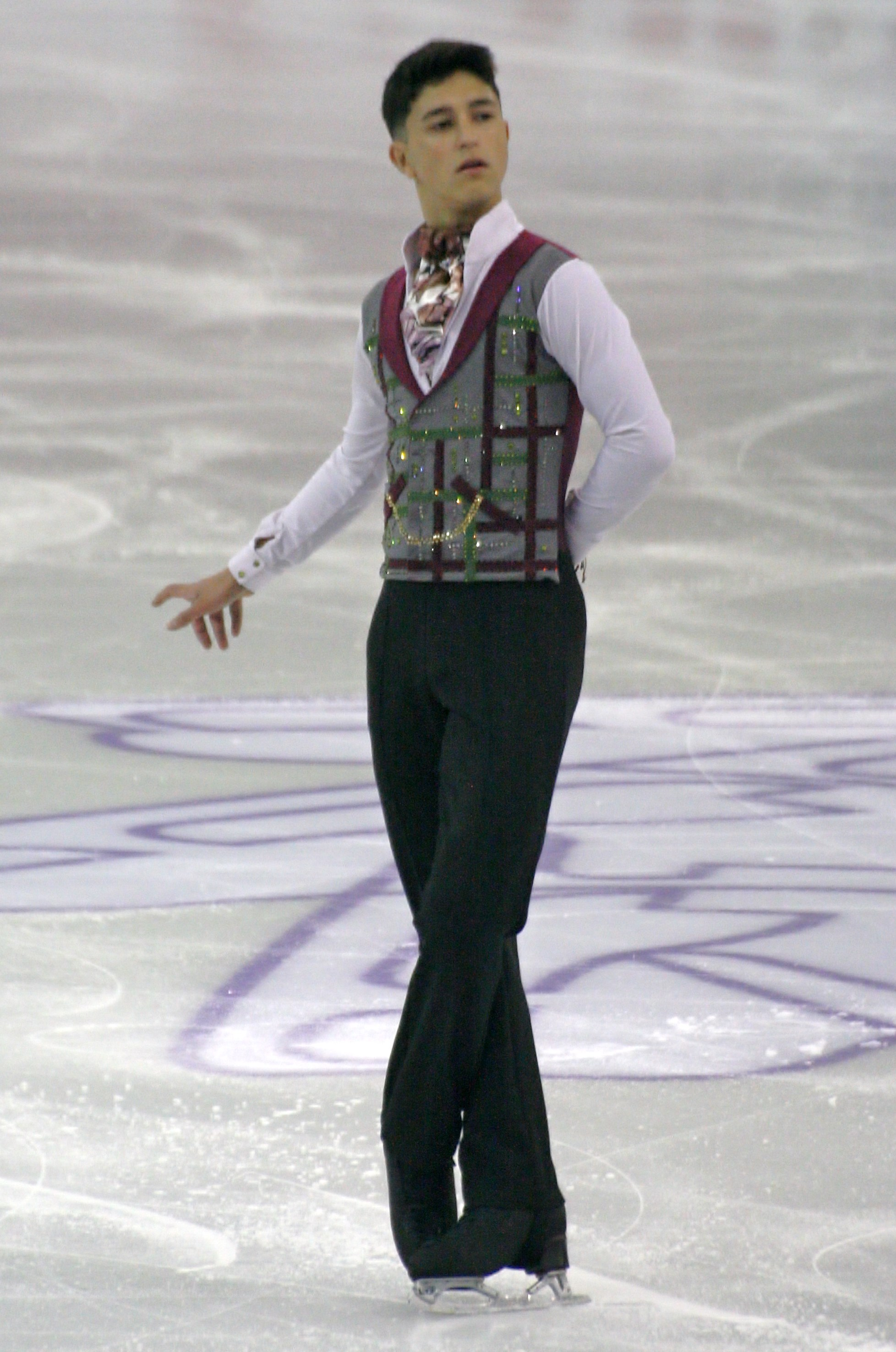
Daniel Samohin held the second best free skate score.

Top 10 personal best scores in the men's combined total
No.	Skater	Nation	Score	Event
1	Vincent Zhou	United States	258.11	2017 World Junior Championships
2	Dmitri Aliev	Russia	247.31	2017 World Junior Championships
3	Alexander Samarin	Russia	245.53	2017 World Junior Championships
4	Alexander Petrov	Russia	243.47	2017 World Junior Championships
5	Cha Jun-hwan	South Korea	242.45	2017 World Junior Championships
6	Shoma Uno	Japan	238.27	2014–15 Junior Grand Prix Final
7	Nathan Chen	United States	236.76	2015 JGP United States
8	Daniel Samohin	Israel	236.65	2016 World Junior Championships
9	Alexei Krasnozhon	United States	236.35	2017–18 Junior Grand Prix Final
10	Alexey Erokhov	Russia	232.79	2017 JGP Belarus

Top 10 personal best scores in the men's short program
No.	Skater	Nation	Score	Event
1	Shoma Uno	Japan	84.87	2015 World Junior Championships
2	Dmitri Aliev	Russia	83.48	2017 World Junior Championships
3	Cha Jun-hwan	South Korea	82.34	2017 World Junior Championships
4	Alexander Samarin	Russia	82.23	2017 World Junior Championships
5	Alexei Krasnozhon	United States	81.33	2017–18 Junior Grand Prix Final
6	Alexander Petrov	Russia	81.29	2017 World Junior Championships
7	Vincent Zhou	United States	80.53	2016 JGP Japan
8	Nicolas Nadeau	Canada	79.54	2015 JGP Croatia
9	Alexey Erokhov	Russia	78.83	2017 JGP Poland
10	Deniss Vasiļjevs	Latvia	78.78	2016 World Junior Championships

Top 10 personal best scores in the men's free skating
No.	Skater	Nation	Score	Event
1	Vincent Zhou	United States	179.24	2017 World Junior Championships
2	Daniel Samohin	Israel	165.63	2017 World Junior Championships
3	Dmitri Aliev	Russia	163.83	2017 World Junior Championships
4	Alexander Samarin	Russia	163.30	2017 World Junior Championships
5	Shoma Uno	Japan	163.06	2014–15 Junior Grand Prix Final
6	Alexander Petrov	Russia	162.18	2017 World Junior Championships
7	Cha Jun-hwan	South Korea	160.13	2016 JGP Japan
8	Nathan Chen	United States	159.63	2015 JGP United States
9	Sota Yamamoto	Japan	157.26	2015 JGP Poland
10	Jin Boyang	China	156.85	2015 World Junior Championships

=== Women's singles ===
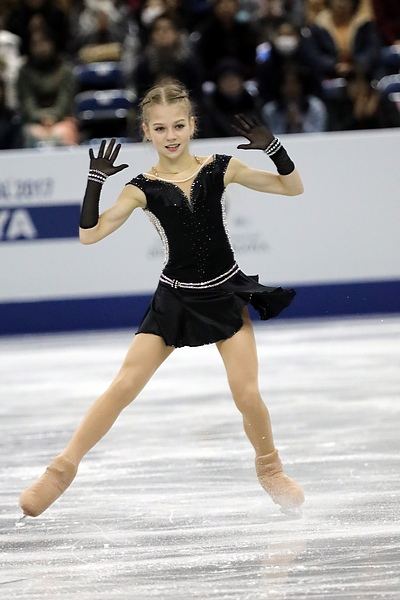
Alexandra Trusova was the record holder for the junior women's combined total, free skate, and short program scores.

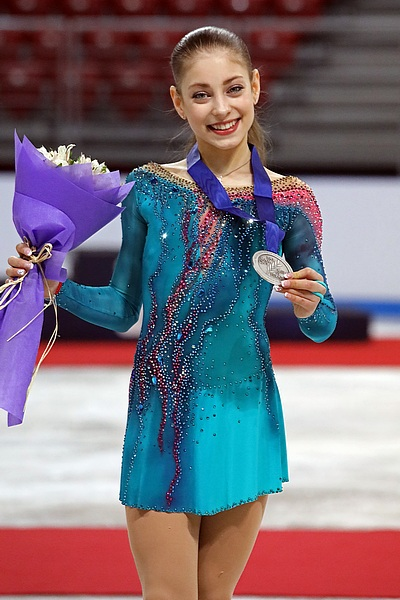
Alena Kostornaia held the second highest score for the short program score.

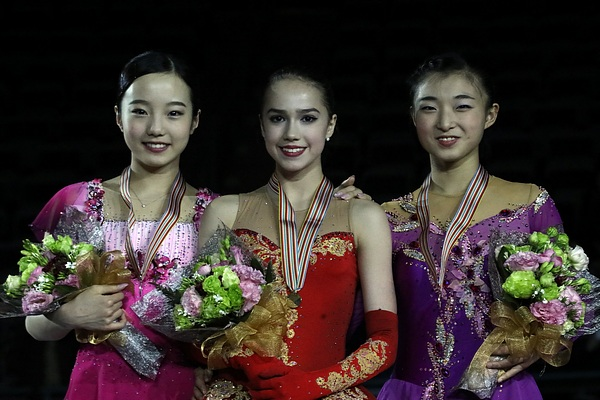
Alina Zagitova held the second highest score for the free skate score.

Top 10 personal best scores in the women's combined total
No.	Skater	Nation	Score	Event
1	Alexandra Trusova	Russia	225.52	2018 World Junior Championships
2	Alina Zagitova	Russia	208.60	2017 World Junior Championships
3	Alena Kostornaia	Russia	207.39	2018 World Junior Championships
4	Marin Honda	Japan	201.61	2017 World Junior Championships
5	Anastasia Tarakanova	Russia	199.64	2017–18 Junior Grand Prix Final
6	Daria Panenkova	Russia	196.55	2017 JGP Poland
7	Kaori Sakamoto	Japan	195.54	2017 World Junior Championships
8	Polina Tsurskaya	Russia	195.28	2015–16 Junior Grand Prix Final
9	Mako Yamashita	Japan	195.17	2018 World Junior Championships
10	Anastasiia Gubanova	Russia	194.57	2016 JGP Germany

Top 10 personal best scores in the women's short program
No.	Skater	Nation	Score	Event
1	Alexandra Trusova	Russia	73.25	2017–18 Junior Grand Prix Final
2	Alena Kostornaia	Russia	71.65	2017–18 Junior Grand Prix Final
3	Alina Zagitova	Russia	70.92	2016–17 Junior Grand Prix Final
4	Polina Tsurskaya	Russia	69.02	2016 JGP Russia
5	Evgenia Medvedeva	Russia	68.48	2015 World Junior Championships
6	Marin Honda	Japan	68.35	2017 World Junior Championships
7	Anastasia Tarakanova	Russia	67.90	2017–18 Junior Grand Prix Final
8	Kaori Sakamoto	Japan	67.78	2017 World Junior Championships
9	Elena Radionova	Russia	66.90	2014 World Junior Championships
10	Rika Kihira	Japan	66.82	2017–18 Junior Grand Prix Final

Top 10 personal best scores in the women's free skating
No.	Skater	Nation	Score	Event
1	Alexandra Trusova	Russia	153.49	2018 World Junior Championships
2	Alina Zagitova	Russia	138.02	2017 World Junior Championships
3	Alena Kostornaia	Russia	135.76	2018 World Junior Championships
4	Anastasiia Gubanova	Russia	133.77	2016–17 Junior Grand Prix Final
5	Marin Honda	Japan	133.26	2017 World Junior Championships
6	Anastasia Tarakanova	Russia	131.74	2017–18 Junior Grand Prix Final
7	Daria Panenkova	Russia	130.91	2017 JGP Poland
8	Polina Tsurskaya	Russia	128.59	2015–16 Junior Grand Prix Final
9	Mako Yamashita	Japan	128.38	2018 World Junior Championships
10	Rika Kihira	Japan	128.31	2016 JGP Slovenia

=== Pairs ===
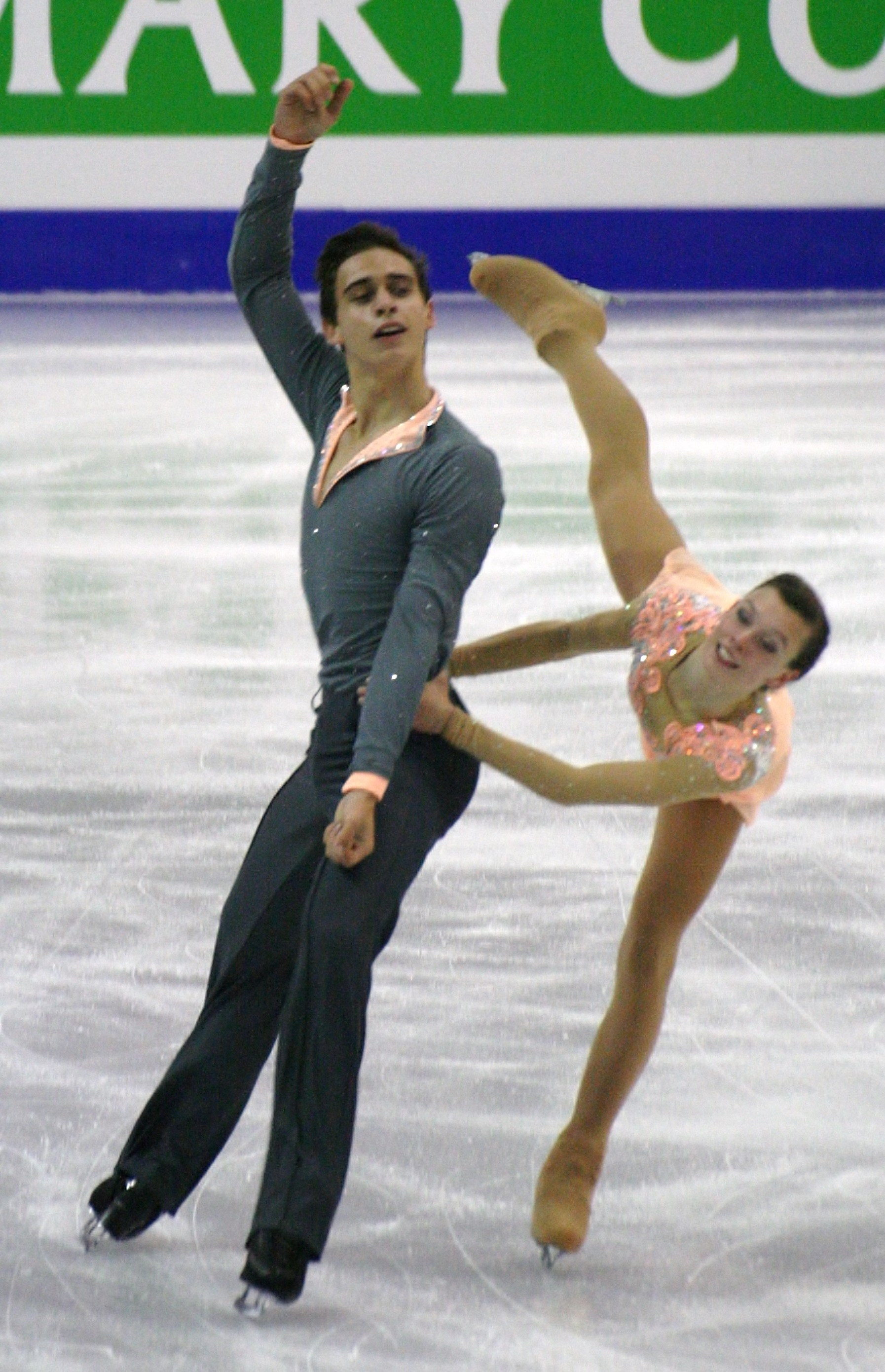
Anna Dušková and Martin Bidař were the record holders for the junior pairs' combined total score.

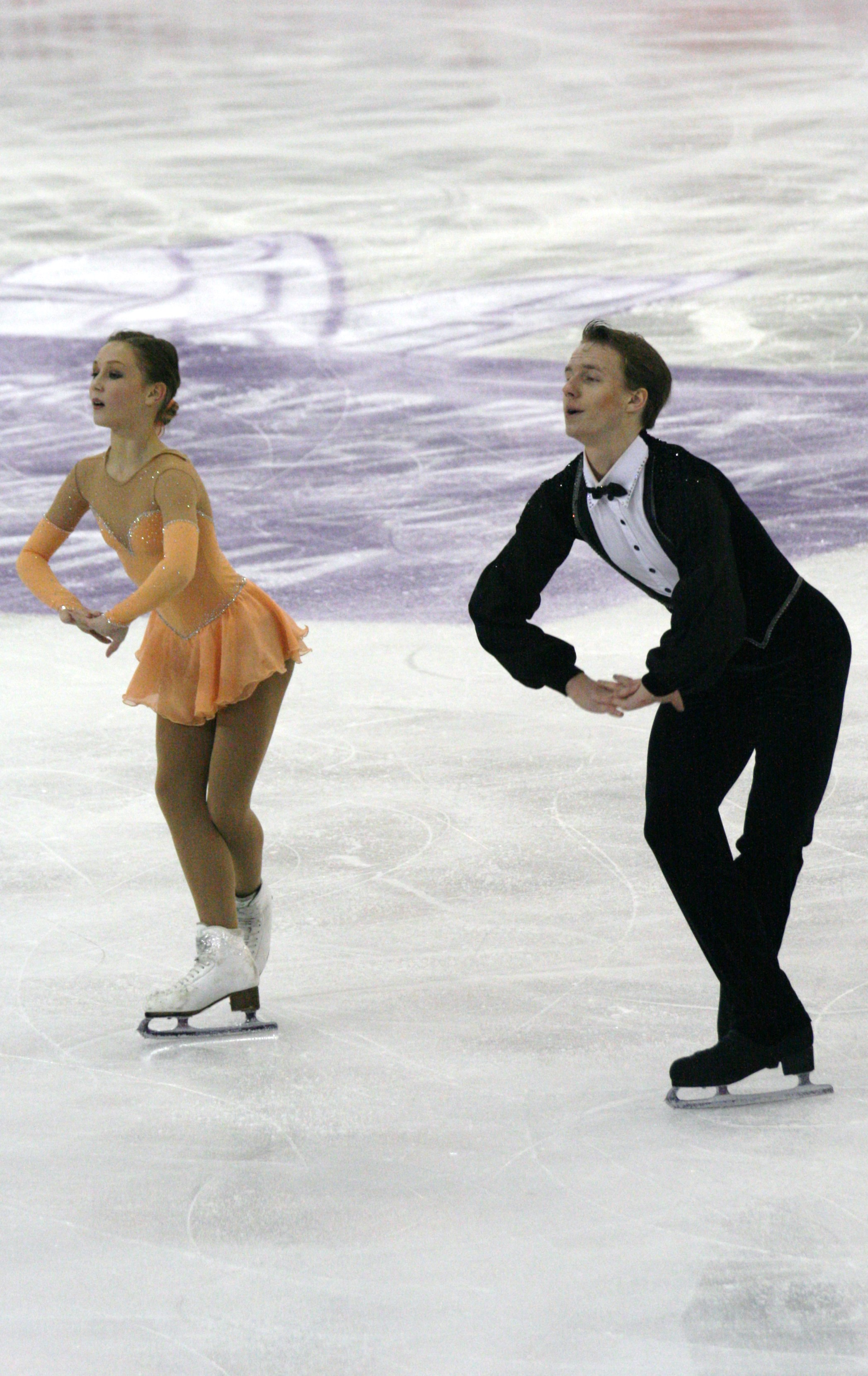
Amina Atakhanova and Ilia Spiridonov were the record holders for the junior pairs' short program score.

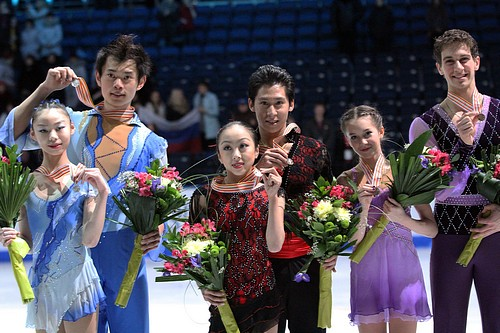
Sui Wenjing and Han Cong were the record holders for the junior pairs' free skate score.

Top 10 personal best scores in the pairs' combined total
No.	Team	Nation	Score	Event
1	Anna Dušková; Martin Bidař	Czech Republic	181.82	2016 World Junior Championships
2	Anastasia Mishina; Vladislav Mirzoev	Russia	180.63	2016–17 Junior Grand Prix Final
3	Daria Pavliuchenko; Denis Khodykin	Russia	180.53	2018 World Junior Championships
4	Yu Xiaoyu; Jin Yang	China	178.79	2015 World Junior Championships
5	Julianne Séguin; Charlie Bilodeau	Canada	176.32	2015 World Junior Championships
6	Sui Wenjing; Han Cong	China	175.69	2012 World Junior Championships
7	Ekaterina Alexandrovskaya; Harley Windsor	Australia	173.85	2017–18 Junior Grand Prix Final
8	Apollinariia Panfilova; Dmitry Rylov	Russia	173.01	2017–18 Junior Grand Prix Final
9	Ekaterina Borisova; Dmitry Sopot	Russia	171.86	2015–16 Junior Grand Prix Final
10	Evgenia Tarasova; Vladimir Morozov	Russia	168.20	2014 World Junior Championships

Top 10 personal best scores in the pairs' short program
No.	Team	Nation	Score	Event
1	Amina Atakhanova; Ilia Spiridonov	Russia	64.79	2016 JGP Estonia
2	Anastasia Mishina; Vladislav Mirzoev	Russia	64.73	2016–17 Junior Grand Prix Final
3	Anna Dušková; Martin Bidař	Czech Republic	64.71	2016 World Junior Championships
4	Daria Pavliuchenko; Denis Khodykin	Russia	63.12	2018 World Junior Championships
5	Yu Xiaoyu; Jin Yang	China	62.58	2014 World Junior Championships
6	Polina Kostiukovich; Dmitrii Ialin	Russia	61.77	2018 World Junior Championships
7	Vasilisa Davankova; Andrei Deputat	Russia	61.48	2013 JGP Estonia
8	Julianne Séguin; Charlie Bilodeau	Canada	61.32	2015 World Junior Championships
9	Aleksandra Boikova; Dmitrii Kozlovskii	Russia	61.27	2017 World Junior Championships
10	Ekaterina Alexandrovskaya; Harley Windsor	Australia	61.00	2017 JGP Poland

Top 10 personal best scores in the pairs' free skating
No.	Team	Nation	Score	Event
1	Sui Wenjing; Han Cong	China	118.54	2011 JGP Austria
2	Daria Pavliuchenko; Denis Khodykin	Russia	117.41	2018 World Junior Championships
3	Anna Dušková; Martin Bidař	Czech Republic	117.11	2016 World Junior Championships
4	Julianne Séguin; Charlie Bilodeau	Canada	116.35	2014–15 Junior Grand Prix Final
5	Yu Xiaoyu; Jin Yang	China	116.23	2015 World Junior Championships
6	Anastasia Mishina; Vladislav Mirzoev	Russia	115.90	2016–17 Junior Grand Prix Final
7	Ekaterina Alexandrovskaya; Harley Windsor	Australia	113.59	2017–18 Junior Grand Prix Final
8	Apollinariia Panfilova; Dmitry Rylov	Russia	112.20	2017–18 Junior Grand Prix Final
9	Ekaterina Borisova; Dmitry Sopot	Russia	111.57	2015–16 Junior Grand Prix Final
10	Maria Vigalova; Egor Zakroev	Russia	110.35	2013 JGP Slovakia

=== Ice dance (2011–18) ===
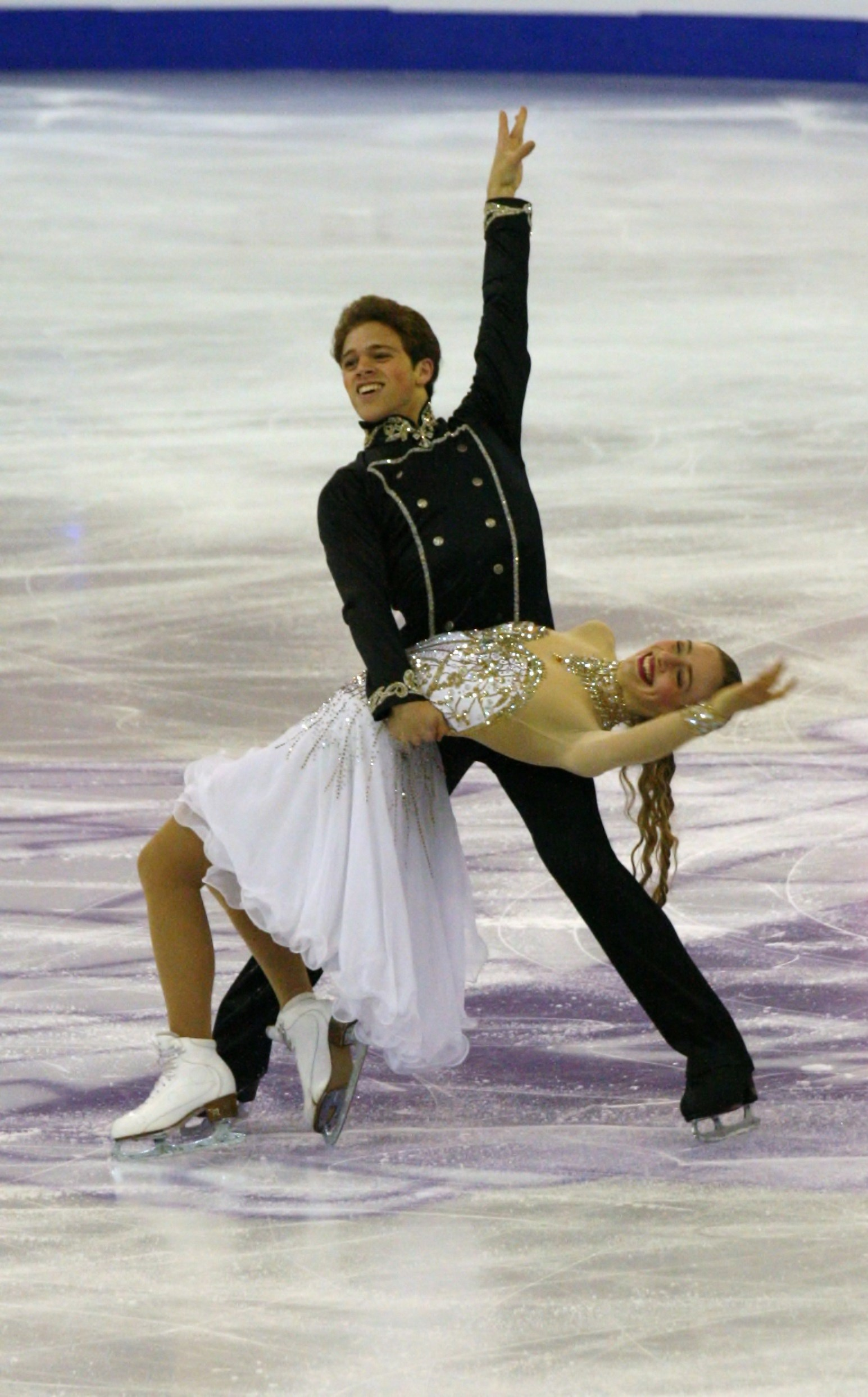
Rachel and Michael Parsons were the record holders of all junior ice dance scores.

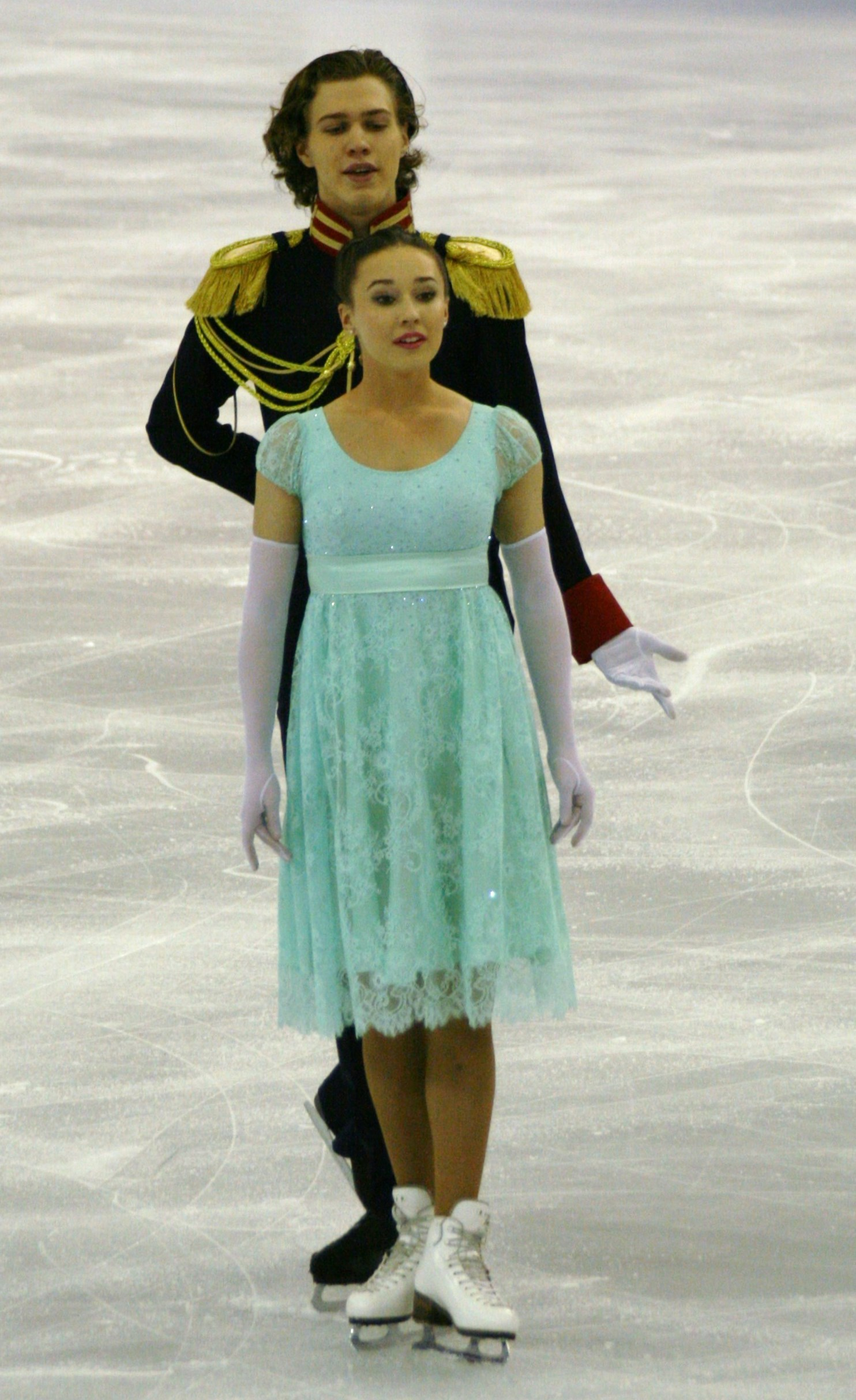
Alla Loboda and Pavel Drozd held the second highest score for the short dance.

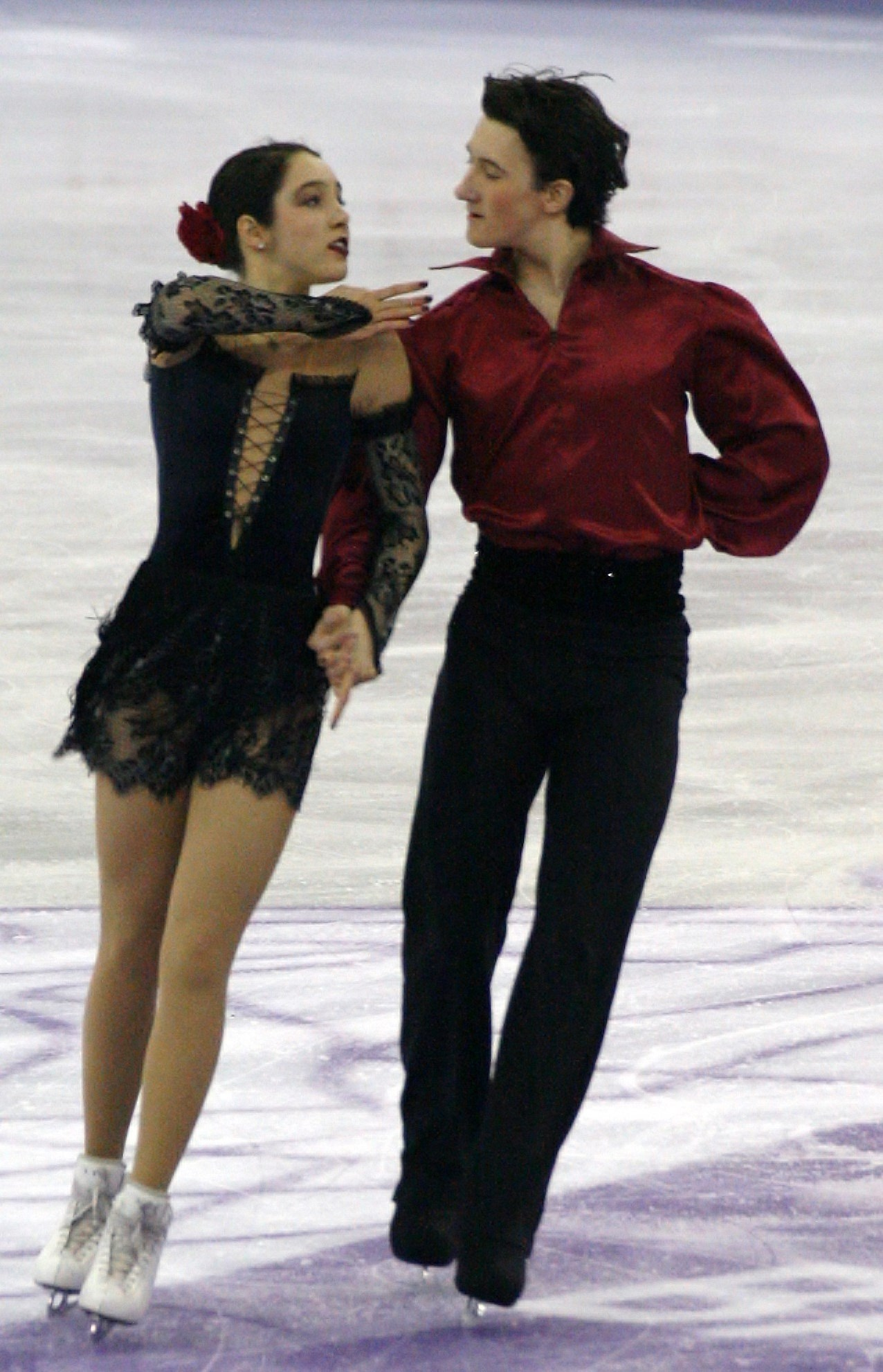
Lorraine McNamara and Quinn Carpenter held the second highest score for the free dance.

Top 10 personal best scores in the combined total (ice dance)
No.	Team	Nation	Score	Event
1	Rachel Parsons; Michael Parsons	United States	164.83	2017 World Junior Championships
2	Alla Loboda; Pavel Drozd	Russia	164.37	2017 World Junior Championships
3	Lorraine McNamara; Quinn Carpenter	United States	163.65	2016 World Junior Championships
4	Christina Carreira; Anthony Ponomarenko	United States	157.19	2016 JGP Russia
5	Kaitlin Hawayek; Jean-Luc Baker	United States	157.12	2014 World Junior Championships
6	Anna Yanovskaya; Sergey Mozgov	Russia	155.92	2015 World Junior Championships
7	Anastasia Skoptsova; Kirill Aleshin	Russia	155.15	2018 World Junior Championships
8	Ksenia Monko; Kirill Khaliavin	Russia	155.04	2010 JGP Great Britain
9	Victoria Sinitsina; Ruslan Zhiganshin	Russia	153.81	2012 World Junior Championships
10	Marie-Jade Lauriault; Romain Le Gac	France	152.72	2015 JGP Spain

Top 10 personal best scores in the short dance
No.	Team	Nation	Score	Event
1	Rachel Parsons; Michael Parsons	United States	67.88	2016 World Junior Championships
2	Alla Loboda; Pavel Drozd	Russia	67.59	2017 World Junior Championships
3	Kaitlin Hawayek; Jean-Luc Baker	United States	66.73	2014 World Junior Championships
4	Lorraine McNamara; Quinn Carpenter	United States	66.60	2016 JGP Czech Republic
5	Anastasia Skoptsova; Kirill Aleshin	Russia	66.44	2018 World Junior Championships
6	Ksenia Monko; Kirill Khaliavin	Russia	65.12	2010 JGP Great Britain
7	Alexandra Stepanova; Ivan Bukin	Russia	64.65	2013 World Junior Championships
8	Christina Carreira; Anthony Ponomarenko	United States	64.10	2017–18 Junior Grand Prix Final
9	Anna Yanovskaya; Sergey Mozgov	Russia	63.80	2014 World Junior Championships
10	Victoria Sinitsina; Ruslan Zhiganshin	Russia	63.78	2012 World Junior Championships

Top 10 personal best scores in the free dance
No.	Team	Nation	Score	Event
1	Rachel Parsons; Michael Parsons	United States	97.54	2017 World Junior Championships
2	Lorraine McNamara; Quinn Carpenter	United States	97.40	2016 World Junior Championships
3	Alla Loboda; Pavel Drozd	Russia	96.91	2016 JGP Russia
4	Christina Carreira; Anthony Ponomarenko	United States	94.15	2017 World Junior Championships
5	Anna Yanovskaya; Sergey Mozgov	Russia	93.70	2015 World Junior Championships
6	Angélique Abachkina; Louis Thauron	France	91.06	2016 JGP France
7	Marie-Jade Lauriault; Romain Le Gac	France	90.89	2015 JGP Spain
8	Anastasia Shpilevaya; Grigory Smirnov	Russia	90.62	2016 JGP Japan
9	Betina Popova; Yuri Vlasenko	Russia	90.54	2015 JGP Spain
10	Kaitlin Hawayek; Jean-Luc Baker	United States	90.39	2014 World Junior Championships

=== Ice dance (2003–10) ===
Prior to the 2010–11 season, ice dance competitions included a compulsory dance and original dance in lieu of the short dance.

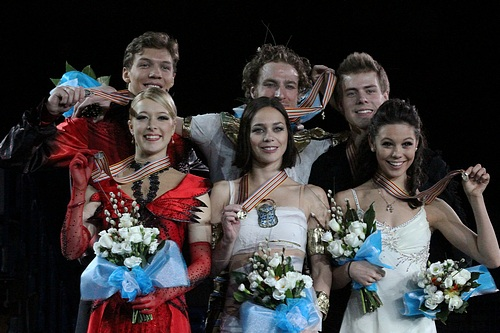
Elena Ilinykh and Nikita Katsalapov were the junior record holders of the original dance. At the time, they were also the record holders of free dance and combined total scores.

Top 10 personal best scores in the combined total (ice dance)
No.	Team	Nation	Score	Event
1	Elena Ilinykh; Nikita Katsalapov	Russia	188.28	2010 World Junior Championships
2	Morgan Matthews; Maxim Zavozin	United States	187.51	2005 World Junior Championships
3	Tessa Virtue; Scott Moir	Canada	183.42	2005 World Junior Championships
4	Emily Samuelson; Evan Bates	United States	181.66	2008 World Junior Championships
5	Vanessa Crone; Paul Poirier	Canada	178.09	2008 World Junior Championships
6	Maia Shibutani; Alex Shibutani	United States	175.95	2009 JGP United States
7	Maria Monko; Ilia Tkachenko	Russia	175.72	2007–08 Junior Grand Prix Final
8	Ksenia Monko; Kirill Khaliavin	Russia	173.15	2009 JGP Turkey
9	Kristina Gorshkova; Vitali Butikov	Russia	172.85	2008 World Junior Championships
10	Madison Chock; Greg Zuerlein	United States	172.55	2009 World Junior Championships

Top 10 personal best scores in the compulsory dance
No.	Team	Nation	Score	Event
1	Morgan Matthews; Maxim Zavozin	United States	39.89	2005 World Junior Championships
2	Anastasia Platonova; Andrei Maximishin	Russia	38.88	2004 JGP Romania
3	Anna Cappellini; Matteo Zanni	Italy	38.40	2004 JGP Serbia
4	Alexandra Zaretsky; Roman Zaretsky	Israel	37.59	2004 JGP Romania
5	Elena Ilinykh; Nikita Katsalapov	Russia	37.52	2010 World Junior Championships
6	Tessa Virtue; Scott Moir	Canada	36.91	2005 World Junior Championships
7	Natalia Mikhailova; Arkadi Sergeev	Russia	36.37	2004 JGP Germany
8	Kristina Gorshkova; Vitali Butikov	Russia	35.86	2004 JGP Serbia
9	Olga Gmizina; Ivan Lobanov	Russia	35.81	2004 JGP Hungary
10	Ekaterina Bobrova; Dmitri Soloviev	Russia	35.52	2007 World Junior Championships

Top 10 personal best scores in the original dance
No.	Team	Nation	Score	Event
1	Elena Ilinykh; Nikita Katsalapov	Russia	59.94	2010 World Junior Championships
2	Tessa Virtue; Scott Moir	Canada	59.72	2005 JGP Andorra
3	Morgan Matthews; Maxim Zavozin	United States	58.89	2005 World Junior Championships
4	Emily Samuelson; Evan Bates	United States	57.84	2008 World Junior Championships
5	Vanessa Crone; Paul Poirier	Canada	57.52	2008 World Junior Championships
6	Madison Chock; Greg Zuerlein	United States	57.29	2009 World Junior Championships
7	Maria Monko; Ilia Tkachenko	Russia	56.62	2007 JGP Great Britain
8	Maia Shibutani; Alex Shibutani	United States	56.35	2009 JGP United States
9	Alexandra Paul; Mitchell Islam	Canada	55.90	2010 World Junior Championships
10	Ksenia Monko; Kirill Khaliavin	Russia	55.70	2009–10 Junior Grand Prix Final

Top 10 personal best scores in the free dance
No.	Team	Nation	Score	Event
1	Elena Ilinykh; Nikita Katsalapov	Russia	90.82	2010 World Junior Championships
2	Morgan Matthews; Maxim Zavozin	United States	88.73	2005 World Junior Championships
3	Emily Samuelson; Evan Bates	United States	88.71	2008 World Junior Championships
4	Tessa Virtue; Scott Moir	Canada	88.18	2005 World Junior Championships
5	Vanessa Crone; Paul Poirier	Canada	86.86	2008 World Junior Championships
6	Ksenia Monko; Kirill Khaliavin	Russia	85.51	2009–10 Junior Grand Prix Final
6	Maia Shibutani; Alex Shibutani	United States	85.51	2009 JGP United States
8	Maria Monko; Ilia Tkachenko	Russia	85.49	2007–08 Junior Grand Prix Final
9	Kristina Gorshkova; Vitali Butikov	Russia	83.87	2008 World Junior Championships
10	Alexandra Paul; Mitchell Islam	Canada	83.15	2010 World Junior Championships

== Absolute best scores ==
These lists may include more than one score from an individual skater.

=== Men's singles ===
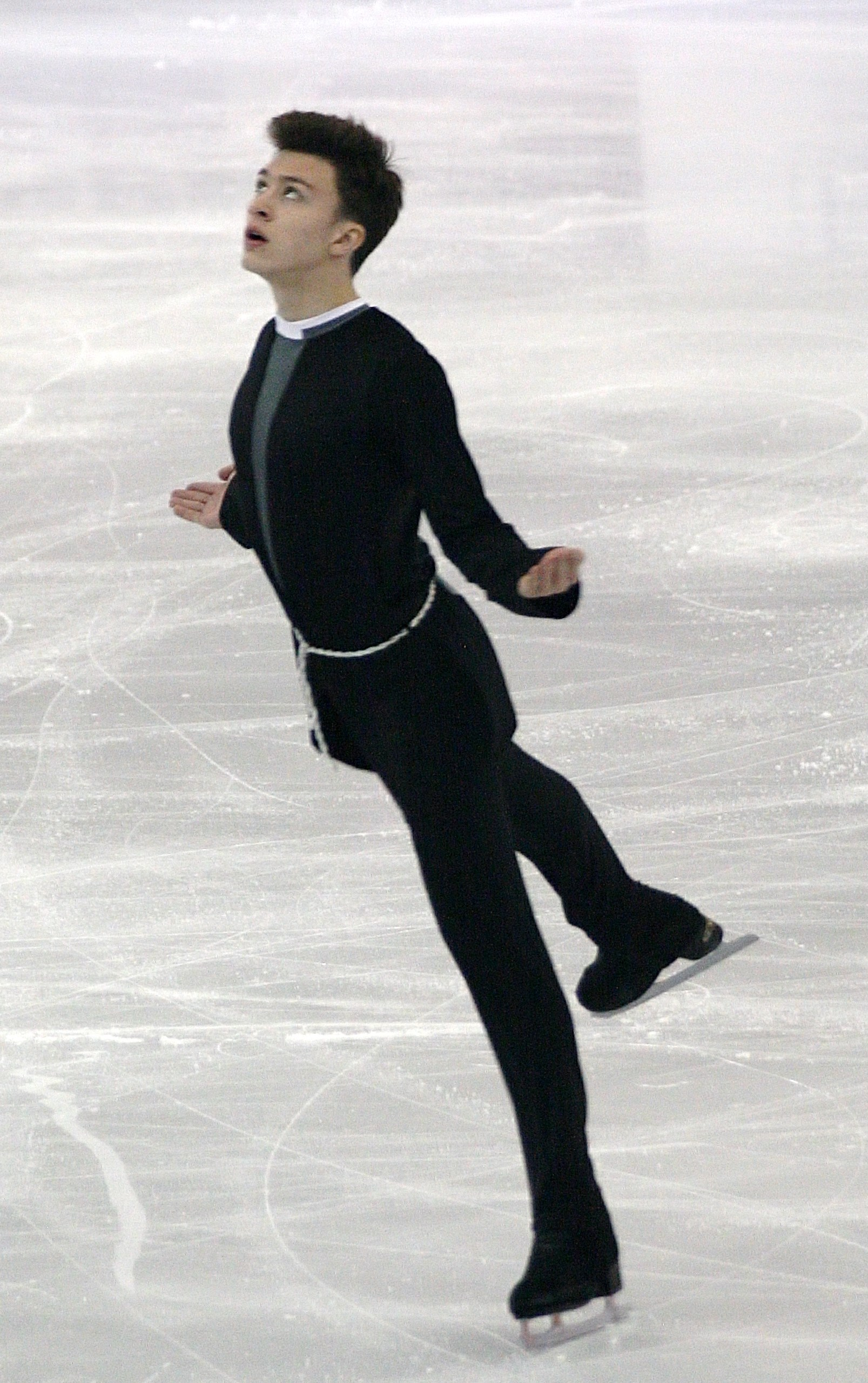
Dmitri Aliev scored twice above 240 points.

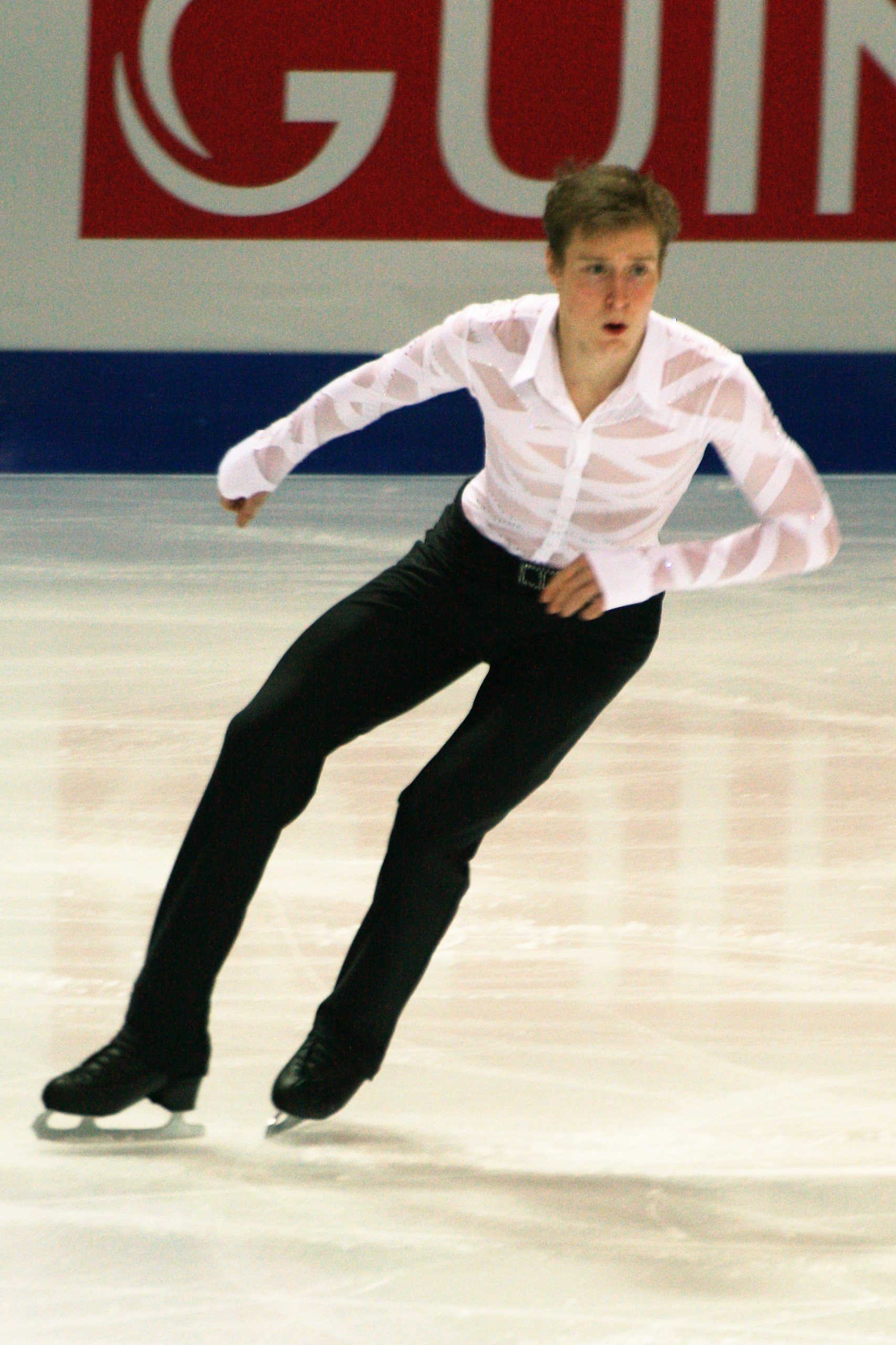
Alexander Samarin three times scored above 80 points in the short program and twice above 160 points in the free skate.

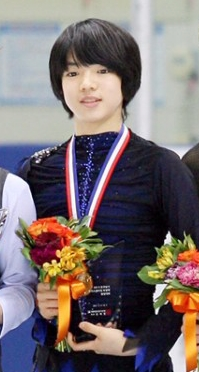
Cha Jun-hwan twice scored above 160 points in the free skate.

Top 10 absolute best scores in the men's combined total
No.	Skater	Nation	Score	Event
1	Vincent Zhou	United States	258.11	2017 World Junior Championships
2	Dmitri Aliev	Russia	247.31	2017 World Junior Championships
3	Alexander Samarin	Russia	245.53	2017 World Junior Championships
4	Alexander Petrov	Russia	243.47	2017 World Junior Championships
5	Cha Jun-hwan	South Korea	242.45	2017 World Junior Championships
6	Dmitri Aliev	Russia	240.07	2016–17 Junior Grand Prix Final
7	Cha Jun-hwan	South Korea	239.47	2016 JGP Japan
8	Shoma Uno	Japan	238.27	2014–15 Junior Grand Prix Final
9	Nathan Chen	United States	236.76	2015 JGP United States
10	Daniel Samohin	Israel	236.65	2016 World Junior Championships

Top 10 absolute best scores in the men's short program
No.	Skater	Nation	Score	Event
1	Shoma Uno	Japan	84.87	2015 World Junior Championships
2	Dmitri Aliev	Russia	83.48	2017 World Junior Championships
3	Cha Jun-hwan	South Korea	82.34	2017 World Junior Championships
4	Alexander Samarin	Russia	82.23	2017 World Junior Championships
5	Dmitri Aliev	Russia	81.37	2016–17 Junior Grand Prix Final
6	Alexei Krasnozhon	United States	81.33	2017–18 Junior Grand Prix Final
7	Alexander Petrov	Russia	81.29	2017 World Junior Championships
8	Alexander Samarin	Russia	81.08	2016–17 Junior Grand Prix Final
9	Dmitri Aliev	Russia	80.74	2016 World Junior Championships
10	Vincent Zhou	United States	80.53	2016 JGP Japan

Top 10 absolute best scores in the men's free skate
No.	Skater	Nation	Score	Event
1	Vincent Zhou	United States	179.24	2017 World Junior Championships
2	Daniel Samohin	Israel	165.63	2017 World Junior Championships
3	Daniel Samohin	Israel	165.38	2016 World Junior Championships
4	Dmitri Aliev	Russia	163.83	2017 World Junior Championships
5	Alexander Samarin	Russia	163.30	2017 World Junior Championships
6	Shoma Uno	Japan	163.06	2014–15 Junior Grand Prix Final
7	Alexander Petrov	Russia	162.18	2017 World Junior Championships
8	Alexander Samarin	Russia	160.93	2016 JGP Estonia
9	Cha Jun-hwan	South Korea	160.13	2016 JGP Japan
10	Cha Jun-hwan	South Korea	160.11	2017 World Junior Championships

=== Women's singles ===
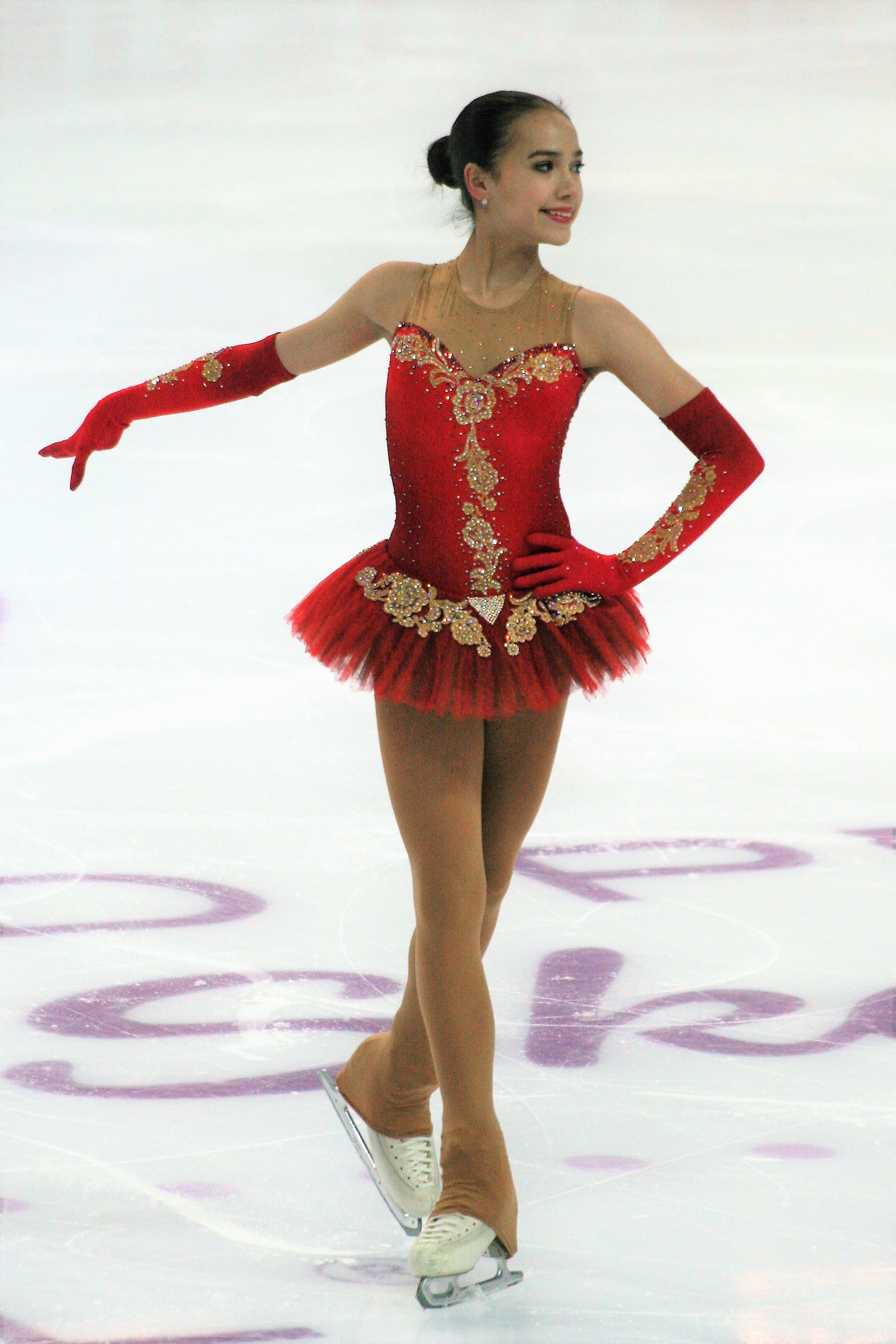
Alina Zagitova scored the two highest combined total scores and the two highest two free skate scores.

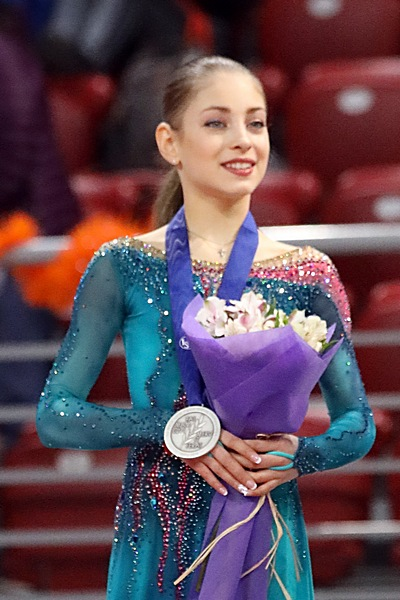
Alena Kostornaia scored two times above 197 points and once above 204 points.

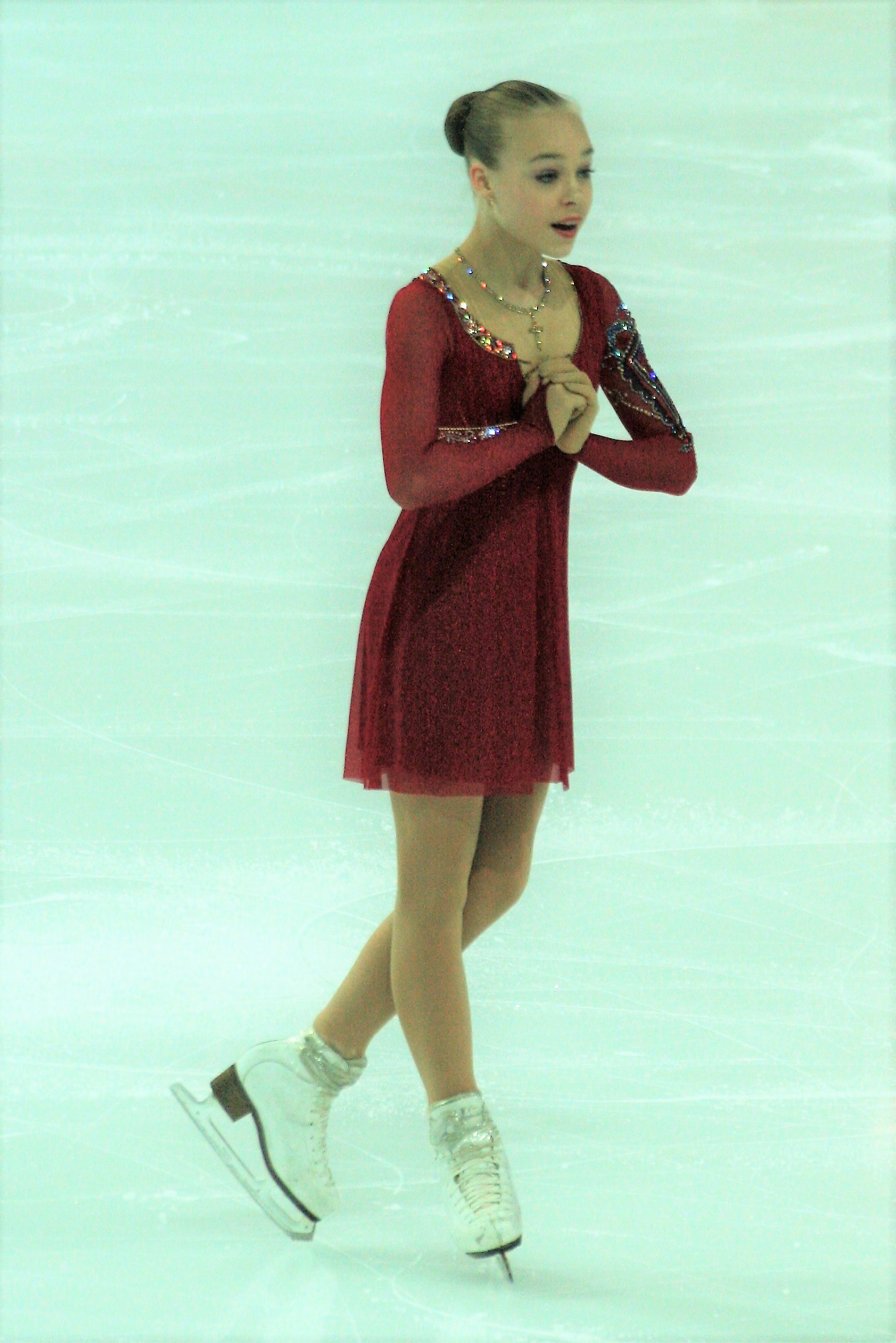
Anastasiia Gubanova scored twice above 194 points.

Top 10 absolute best scores in the women's combined total
No.	Skater	Nation	Score	Event
1	Alexandra Trusova	Russia	225.52	2018 World Junior Championships
2	Alina Zagitova	Russia	208.60	2017 World Junior Championships
3	Alina Zagitova	Russia	207.43	2016–17 Junior Grand Prix Final
4	Alena Kostornaia	Russia	207.39	2018 World Junior Championships
5	Alexandra Trusova	Russia	205.61	2017–18 Junior Grand Prix Final
6	Alena Kostornaia	Russia	204.58	2017–18 Junior Grand Prix Final
7	Marin Honda	Japan	201.61	2017 World Junior Championships
8	Anastasia Tarakanova	Russia	199.64	2017–18 Junior Grand Prix Final
9	Alena Kostornaia	Russia	197.91	2017 JGP Poland
10	Alexandra Trusova	Russia	197.69	2017 JGP Australia

Top 10 absolute best scores in the women's short program
No.	Skater	Nation	Score	Event
1	Alexandra Trusova	Russia	73.25	2017–18 Junior Grand Prix Final
2	Alexandra Trusova	Russia	72.03	2018 World Junior Championships
3	Alena Kostornaia	Russia	71.65	2017–18 Junior Grand Prix Final
4	Alena Kostornaia	Russia	71.63	2018 World Junior Championships
5	Alina Zagitova	Russia	70.92	2016–17 Junior Grand Prix Final
6	Alina Zagitova	Russia	70.58	2017 World Junior Championships
7	Alexandra Trusova	Russia	69.72	2017 JGP Belarus
8	Alena Kostornaia	Russia	69.16	2017 JGP Poland
9	Polina Tsurskaya	Russia	69.02	2016 JGP Russia
10	Evgenia Medvedeva	Russia	68.48	2015 World Junior Championships

Top 10 absolute best scores in the women's free skate
No.	Skater	Nation	Score	Event
1	Alexandra Trusova	Russia	153.49	2018 World Junior Championships
2	Alina Zagitova	Russia	138.02	2017 World Junior Championships
3	Alina Zagitova	Russia	136.51	2016–17 Junior Grand Prix Final
4	Alena Kostornaia	Russia	135.76	2018 World Junior Championships
5	Anastasiia Gubanova	Russia	133.77	2016–17 Junior Grand Prix Final
6	Marin Honda	Japan	133.26	2017 World Junior Championships
7	Alena Kostornaia	Russia	132.93	2017–18 Junior Grand Prix Final
8	Alexandra Trusova	Russia	132.36	2017–18 Junior Grand Prix Final
9	Alexandra Trusova	Russia	132.12	2017 JGP Australia
10	Anastasia Tarakanova	Russia	131.74	2017–18 Junior Grand Prix Final

=== Pairs ===
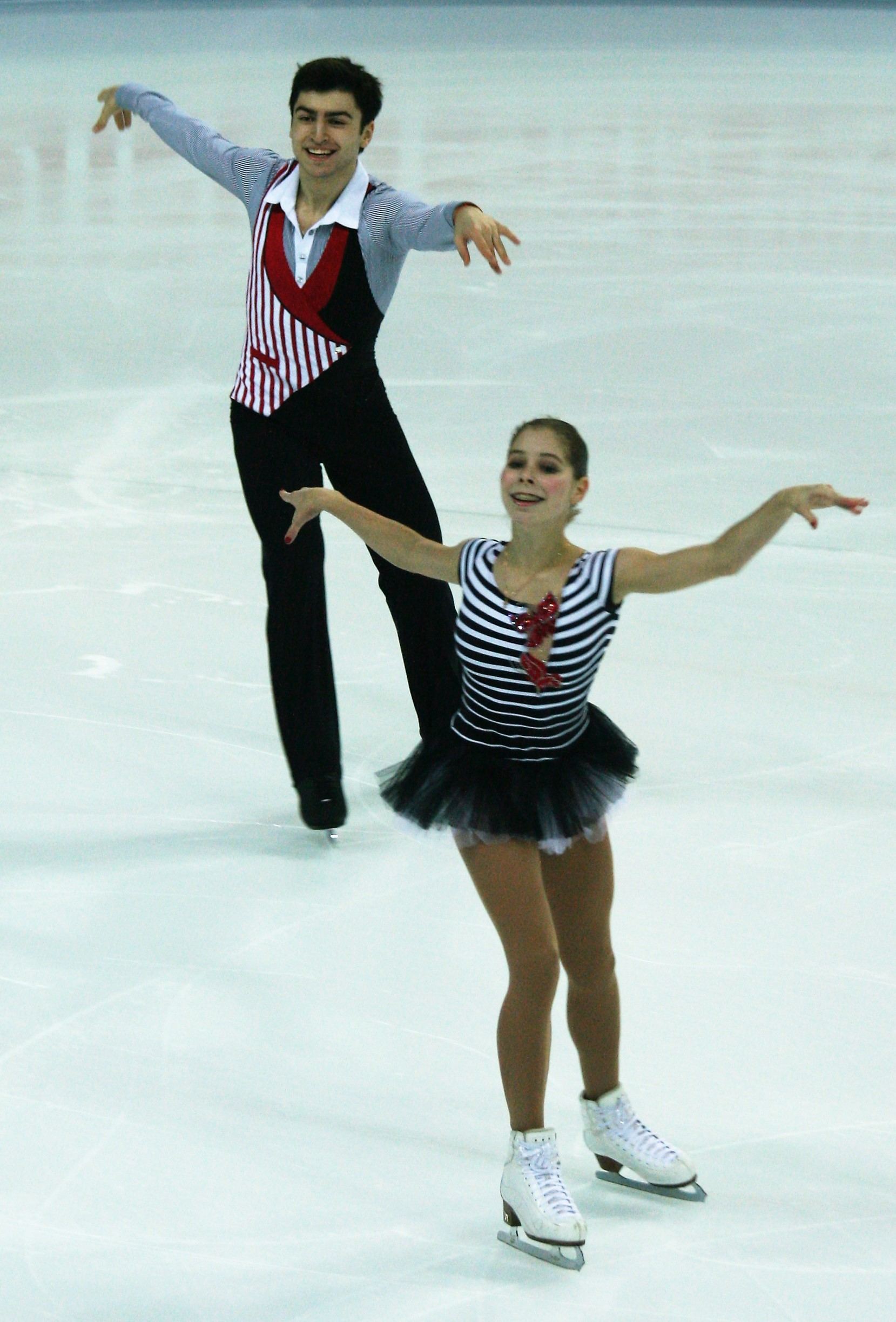
Anastasia Mishina and Vladislav Mirzoev scored once above 180 points and four times above 172 points.

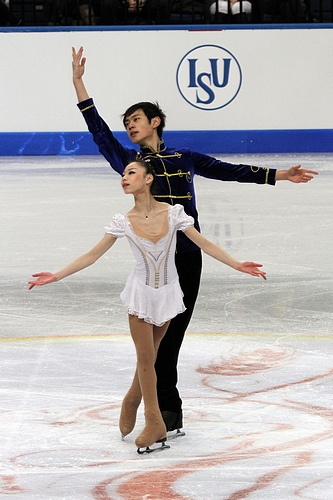
Yu Xiaoyu and Jin Yang three times scored thrice above 173 points.

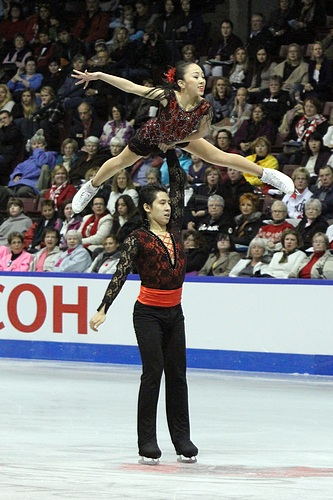
Sui Wenjing and Han Cong twice scored above 116 points in the free skate.

Top 10 absolute best scores in the pairs' combined total
No.	Team	Nation	Score	Event
1	Anna Dušková; Martin Bidař	Czech Republic	181.82	2016 World Junior Championships
2	Anastasia Mishina; Vladislav Mirzoev	Russia	180.63	2016–17 Junior Grand Prix Final
3	Daria Pavliuchenko; Denis Khodykin	Russia	180.53	2018 World Junior Championships
4	Yu Xiaoyu; Jin Yang	China	178.79	2015 World Junior Championships
5	Julianne Séguin; Charlie Bilodeau	Canada	176.32	2015 World Junior Championships
6	Anastasia Mishina; Vladislav Mirzoev	Russia	175.82	2016 JGP Russia
7	Sui Wenjing; Han Cong	China	175.69	2012 World Junior Championships
8	Julianne Séguin; Charlie Bilodeau	Canada	175.57	2014–15 Junior Grand Prix Final
9	Julianne Séguin; Charlie Bilodeau	Canada	174.10	2014 JGP Germany
10	Ekaterina Alexandrovskaya; Harley Windsor	Australia	173.85	2017–18 Junior Grand Prix Final

Top 10 absolute best scores in the pairs' short program
No.	Team	Nation	Score	Event
1	Amina Atakhanova; Ilia Spiridonov	Russia	64.79	2016 JGP Estonia
2	Anastasia Mishina; Vladislav Mirzoev	Russia	64.73	2016–17 Junior Grand Prix Final
3	Anna Dušková; Martin Bidař	Czech Republic	64.71	2016 World Junior Championships
4	Anastasia Mishina; Vladislav Mirzoev	Russia	63.93	2016 JGP Russia
5	Daria Pavliuchenko; Denis Khodykin	Russia	63.12	2018 World Junior Championships
6	Anna Dušková; Martin Bidař	Czech Republic	62.94	2016 JGP Czech Republic
7	Yu Xiaoyu; Jin Yang	China	62.58	2014 World Junior Championships
8	Yu Xiaoyu; Jin Yang	China	62.56	2015 World Junior Championships
9	Yu Xiaoyu; Jin Yang	China	62.25	2013 JGP Estonia
10	Anastasia Mishina; Vladislav Mirzoev	Russia	62.10	2016 JGP Germany

Top 10 absolute best scores in the pairs' free skate
No.	Team	Nation	Score	Event
1	Sui Wenjing; Han Cong	China	118.54	2011 JGP Austria
2	Daria Pavliuchenko; Denis Khodykin	Russia	117.41	2018 World Junior Championships
3	Anna Dušková; Martin Bidař	Czech Republic	117.11	2016 World Junior Championships
4	Sui Wenjing; Han Cong	China	116.40	2012 World Junior Championships
5	Julianne Séguin; Charlie Bilodeau	Canada	116.35	2014–15 Junior Grand Prix Final
6	Yu Xiaoyu; Jin Yang	China	116.23	2015 World Junior Championships
7	Anastasia Mishina; Vladislav Mirzoev	Russia	115.90	2016–17 Junior Grand Prix Final
8	Julianne Séguin; Charlie Bilodeau	Canada	115.00	2015 World Junior Championships
9	Julianne Séguin; Charlie Bilodeau	Canada	114.92	2014 JGP Germany
10	Ekaterina Alexandrovskaya; Harley Windsor	Australia	113.59	2017–18 Junior Grand Prix Final

=== Ice dance ===
==== Best total scores ====
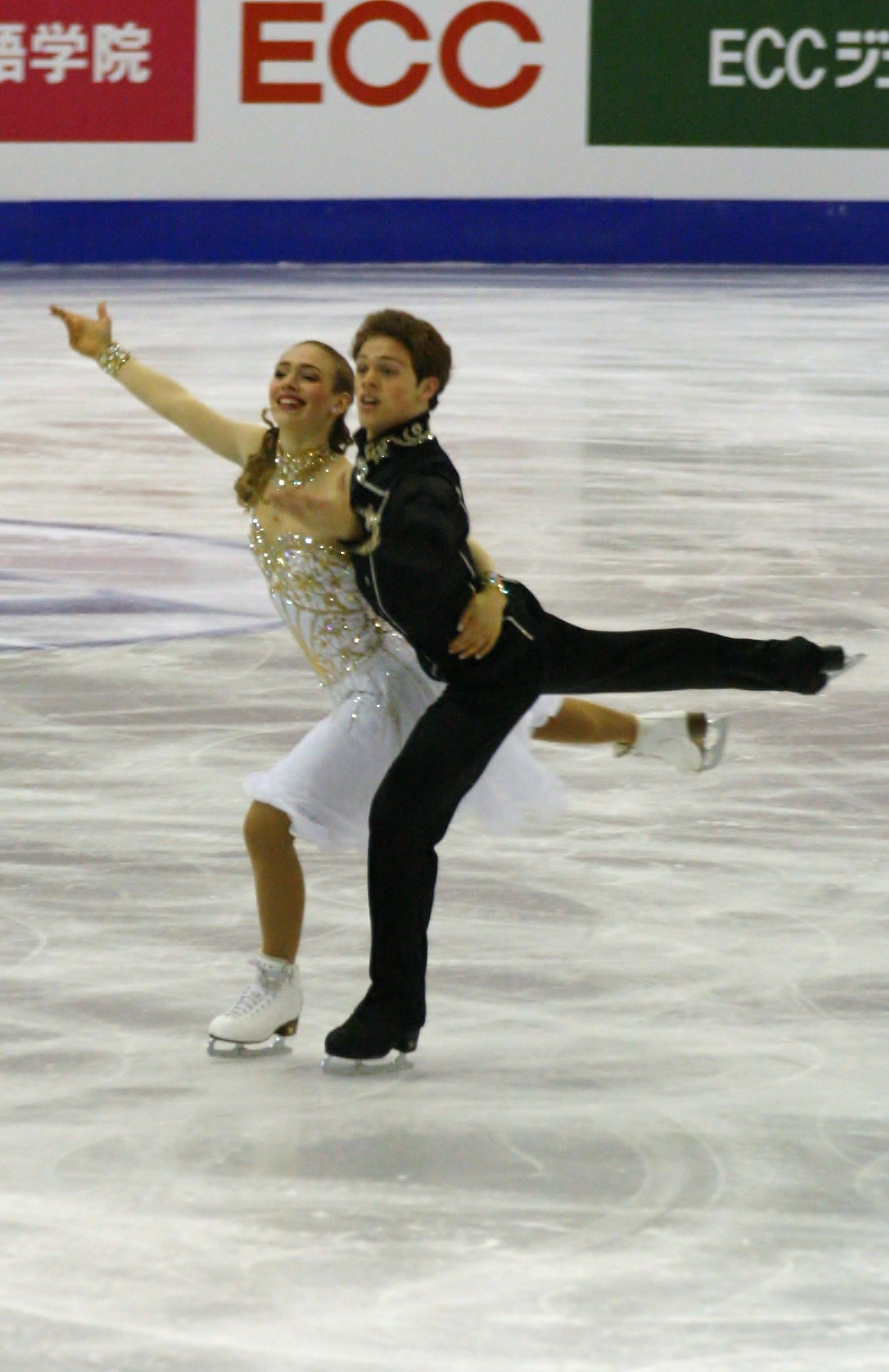
Rachel and Michael Parsons scored five times above 160 points.

Rank	Name	Nation	Score	Event
1	Rachel Parsons / Michael Parsons	United States	164.83	2017 World Junior Championships
2	Alla Loboda / Pavel Drozd	Russia	164.37	2017 World Junior Championships
3	Lorraine McNamara / Quinn Carpenter	United States	163.65	2016 World Junior Championships
4	Rachel Parsons / Michael Parsons	United States	162.74	2016 World Junior Championships
5	Lorraine McNamara / Quinn Carpenter	United States	162.63	2015 JGP Poland
6	Rachel Parsons / Michael Parsons	United States	162.50	2016–17 Junior Grand Prix Final
7	Alla Loboda / Pavel Drozd	Russia	161.87	2016 JGP Russia
7	Alla Loboda / Pavel Drozd	Russia	161.87	2016–17 Junior Grand Prix Final
9	Rachel Parsons / Michael Parsons	United States	160.79	2015 JGP Croatia
10	Rachel Parsons / Michael Parsons	United States	160.42	2016 JGP Japan

==== Best short dance scores ====
Rank	Name	Nation	Score	Event
1	Rachel Parsons / Michael Parsons	United States	67.88	2016 World Junior Championships
2	Alla Loboda / Pavel Drozd	Russia	67.59	2017 World Junior Championships
3	Alla Loboda / Pavel Drozd	Russia	67.58	2016–17 Junior Grand Prix Final
4	Rachel Parsons / Michael Parsons	United States	67.29	2017 World Junior Championships
5	Rachel Parsons / Michael Parsons	United States	66.91	2016–17 Junior Grand Prix Final
6	Rachel Parsons / Michael Parsons	United States	66.76	2016 JGP Japan
7	Kaitlin Hawayek / Jean-Luc Baker	United States	66.73	2014 World Junior Championships
8	Lorraine McNamara / Quinn Carpenter	United States	66.60	2016 JGP Czech Republic
9	Rachel Parsons / Michael Parsons	United States	66.49	2015 JGP Croatia
10	Anastasia Skoptsova / Kirill Aleshin	Russia	66.44	2018 World Junior Championships

==== Best free dance scores ====
Rank	Name	Nation	Score	Event
1	Rachel Parsons / Michael Parsons	United States	97.54	2017 World Junior Championships
2	Lorraine McNamara / Quinn Carpenter	United States	97.40	2016 World Junior Championships
3	Lorraine McNamara / Quinn Carpenter	United States	97.21	2015 JGP Poland
4	Alla Loboda / Pavel Drozd	Russia	96.91	2016 JGP Russia
5	Alla Loboda / Pavel Drozd	Russia	96.78	2017 World Junior Championships
6	Rachel Parsons / Michael Parsons	United States	95.59	2016–17 Junior Grand Prix Final
7	Rachel Parsons / Michael Parsons	United States	94.86	2016 World Junior Championships
8	Rachel Parsons / Michael Parsons	United States	94.30	2015 JGP Croatia
9	Alla Loboda / Pavel Drozd	Russia	94.29	2016–17 Junior Grand Prix Final
10	Christina Carreira / Anthony Ponomarenko	United States	94.15	2017 World Junior Championships

== Progression of junior record scores ==
=== Men's singles ===
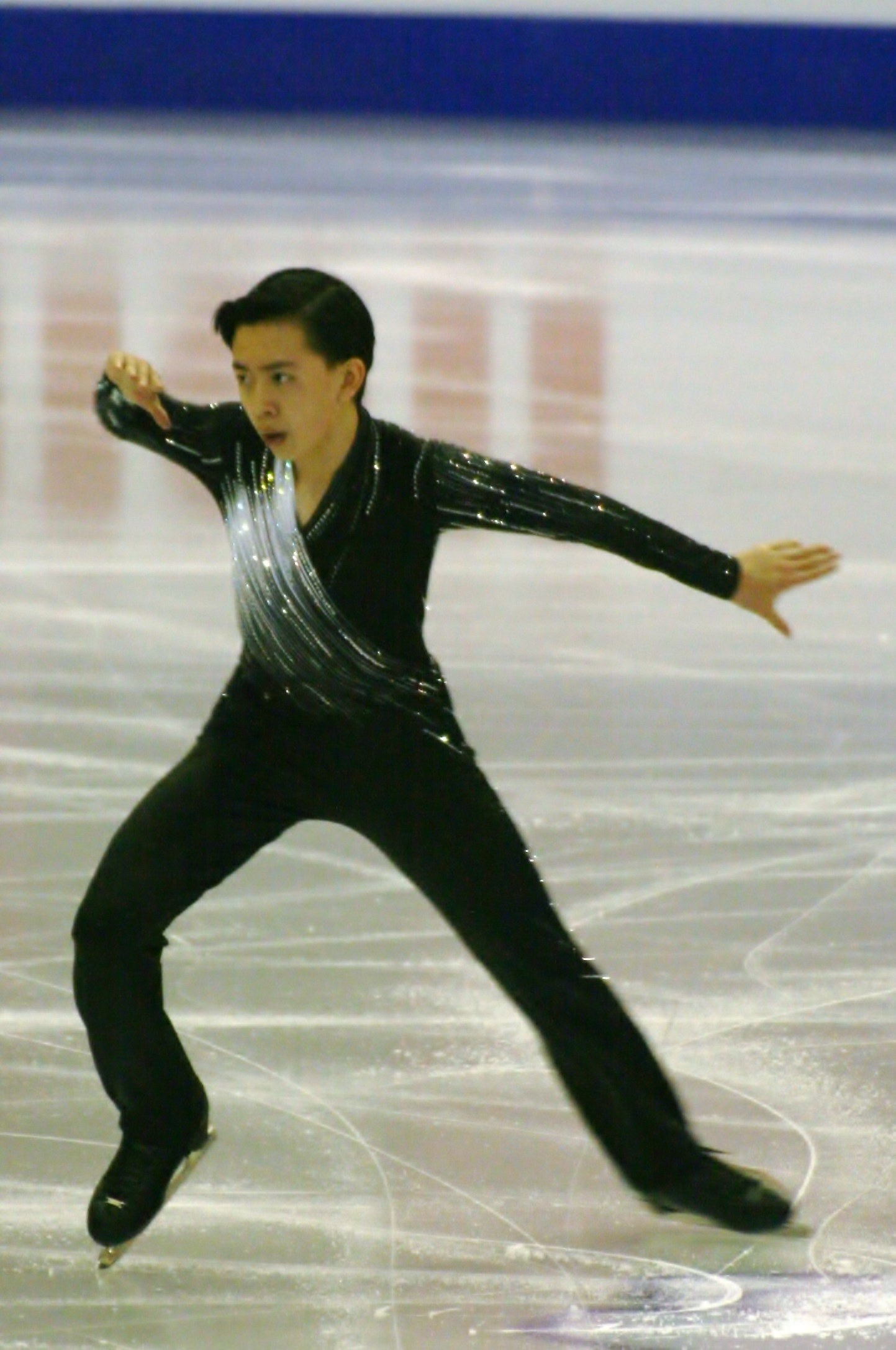
Vincent Zhou scored an impressive 258 points at the 2017 World Junior Championships.

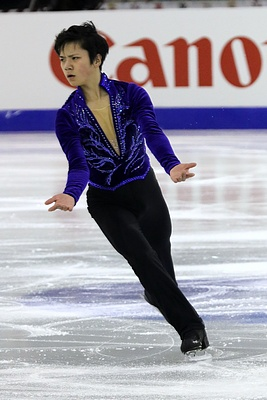
Shoma Uno scored an impressive short program score of 84.87 points at the 2015 World Junior Championships.

This list begins with the skater who first scored above 200 points.

Progression of junior men's combined total record score
Date	Skater	Nation	Score	Event
December 9, 2007	Adam Rippon	United States	203.20	2007–08 Junior Grand Prix Final
March 1, 2009	Michal Březina	Czech Republic	204.88	2009 World Junior Championships
March 1, 2009	Adam Rippon	United States	222.00	2009 World Junior Championships
March 4, 2012	Yan Han	China	222.45	2012 World Junior Championships
March 3, 2013	Joshua Farris	United States	228.32	2013 World Junior Championships
December 14, 2014	Shoma Uno	Japan	238.27	2014–15 Junior Grand Prix Final
September 11, 2016	Cha Jun-hwan	South Korea	239.47	2016 JGP Japan
December 11, 2016	Dmitri Aliev	Russia	240.07	2016–17 Junior Grand Prix Final
March 19, 2017	Vincent Zhou	United States	258.11	2017 World Junior Championships

This list begins with the skater who first scored above 70 points.

Progression of junior men's short program record score
Date	Skater	Nation	Score	Event
October 18, 2008	Florent Amodio	France	72.00	2008 JGP Great Britain
March 1, 2009	Adam Rippon	United States	74.30	2009 World Junior Championships
September 18, 2011	Joshua Farris	United States	75.69	2011 JGP Poland
March 2, 2013	Joshua Farris	United States	75.84	2013 World Junior Championships
December 13, 2014	Sōta Yamamoto	Japan	76.14	2014–15 Junior Grand Prix Final
March 8, 2015	Adian Pitkeev	Russia	76.94	2015 World Junior Championships
March 8, 2015	Shoma Uno	Japan	84.87	2015 World Junior Championships

This list begins with the skater who first scored above 145 points.

Progression of junior men's free skating record score
Date	Skater	Nation	Score	Event
March 1, 2009	Adam Rippon	United States	147.70	2009 World Junior Championships
December 12, 2010	Richard Dornbush	United States	148.81	2010–11 Junior Grand Prix Final
October 6, 2012	Maxim Kovtun	Russia	149.72	2012 JGP Croatia
December 9, 2012	Maxim Kovtun	Russia	149.78	2012–13 Junior Grand Prix Final
March 2, 2013	Joshua Farris	United States	152.48	2013 World Junior Championships
March 2, 2013	Jason Brown	United States	154.09	2013 World Junior Championships
December 14, 2014	Shoma Uno	Japan	163.06	2014–15 Junior Grand Prix Final
March 20, 2016	Daniel Samohin	Israel	165.38	2016 World Junior Championships
March 19, 2017	Daniel Samohin	Israel	165.63	2017 World Junior Championships
March 19, 2017	Vincent Zhou	United States	179.24	2017 World Junior Championships

=== Women's singles ===
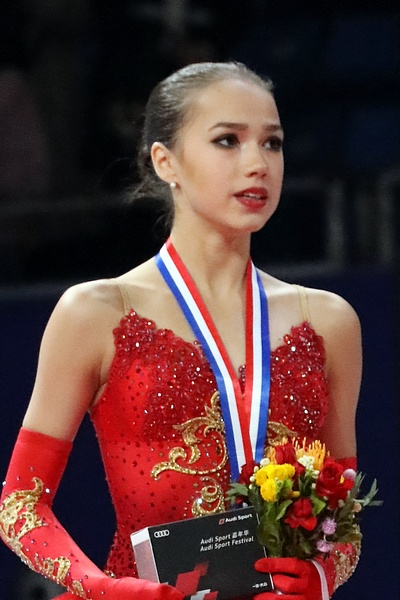
Alina Zagitova scored 208.60 points at the 2017 World Junior Championships, which was a world record at the time. She scored five world records during her junior career.

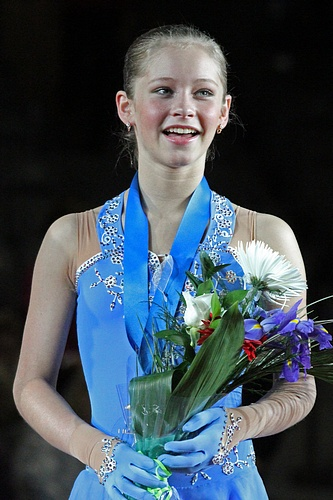
Yulia Lipnitskaya scored 187.05 points at the 2012 World Junior Championships, which was a world record at the time. She scored five world records during her junior career.

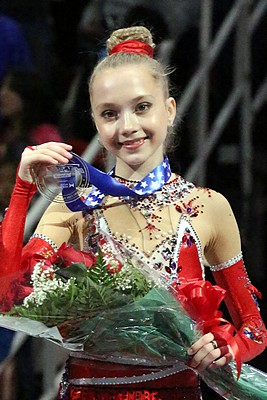
Elena Radionova scored 194.29 points at the 2014 World Junior Championships, which was the world junior record at the time. She scored three world records during her junior career.

This list begins with the skater who first scored above 180 points.

Progression of junior women's combined total record score
Date	Skater	Nation	Score	Event
October 9, 2011	Yulia Lipnitskaya	Russia	183.05	2011 JGP Italy
March 4, 2012	Yulia Lipnitskaya	Russia	187.05	2012 World Junior Championships
March 16, 2014	Elena Radionova	Russia	194.29	2014 World Junior Championships
December 13, 2015	Polina Tsurskaya	Russia	195.28	2015–16 Junior Grand Prix Final
December 11, 2016	Alina Zagitova	Russia	207.43	2016–17 Junior Grand Prix Final
March 19, 2017	Alina Zagitova	Russia	208.60	2017 World Junior Championships
March 10, 2018	Alexandra Trusova	Russia	225.52	2018 World Junior Championships

This list begins with the skater who first scored above 60 points.

Progression of junior women's short program record score
Date	Skater	Nation	Score	Event
March 5, 2005	Mao Asada	Japan	60.11	2005 World Junior Championships
March 11, 2006	Yuna Kim	South Korea	60.86	2006 World Junior Championships
March 1, 2008	Caroline Zhang	United States	62.60	2008 World Junior Championships
March 1, 2008	Mirai Nagasu	United States	65.07	2008 World Junior Championships
March 15, 2014	Elena Radionova	Russia	66.90	2014 World Junior Championships
December 13, 2014	Evgenia Medvedeva	Russia	67.09	2014–15 Junior Grand Prix Final
March 7, 2015	Evgenia Medvedeva	Russia	68.48	2015 World Junior Championships
September 16, 2016	Polina Tsurskaya	Russia	69.02	2016 JGP Russia
December 10, 2016	Alina Zagitova	Russia	70.92	2016–17 Junior Grand Prix Final
December 7, 2017	Alena Kostornaia	Russia	71.65	2017–18 Junior Grand Prix Final
December 7, 2017	Alexandra Trusova	Russia	73.25	2017–18 Junior Grand Prix Final

This list begins with the skater who first scored above 120 points.

Progression of junior women's free skating record score
Date	Skater	Nation	Score	Event
March 4, 2012	Yulia Lipnitskaya	Russia	123.96	2012 World Junior Championships
March 16, 2014	Elena Radionova	Russia	127.39	2014 World Junior Championships
December 13, 2015	Polina Tsurskaya	Russia	128.59	2015–16 Junior Grand Prix Final
September 11, 2016	Marin Honda	Japan	128.64	2016 JGP Japan
October 9, 2016	Anastasiia Gubanova	Russia	129.14	2016 JGP Germany
December 11, 2016	Anastasiia Gubanova	Russia	133.77	2016–17 Junior Grand Prix Final
December 11, 2016	Alina Zagitova	Russia	136.51	2016–17 Junior Grand Prix Final
March 19, 2017	Alina Zagitova	Russia	138.02	2017 World Junior Championships
March 10, 2018	Alexandra Trusova	Russia	153.49	2018 World Junior Championships

=== Pairs ===
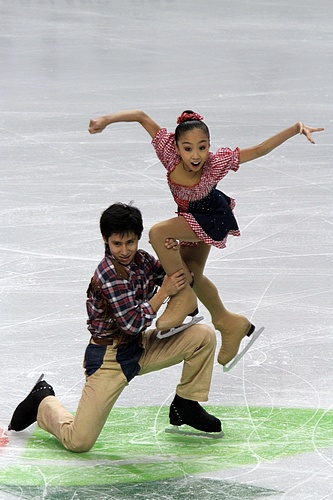
Sui Wenjing and Han Cong scored 118.54 points in free skating at the 2011 JGP Austria and they still hold the current world junior free skating record. They scored a total of ten world junior records during their junior career.

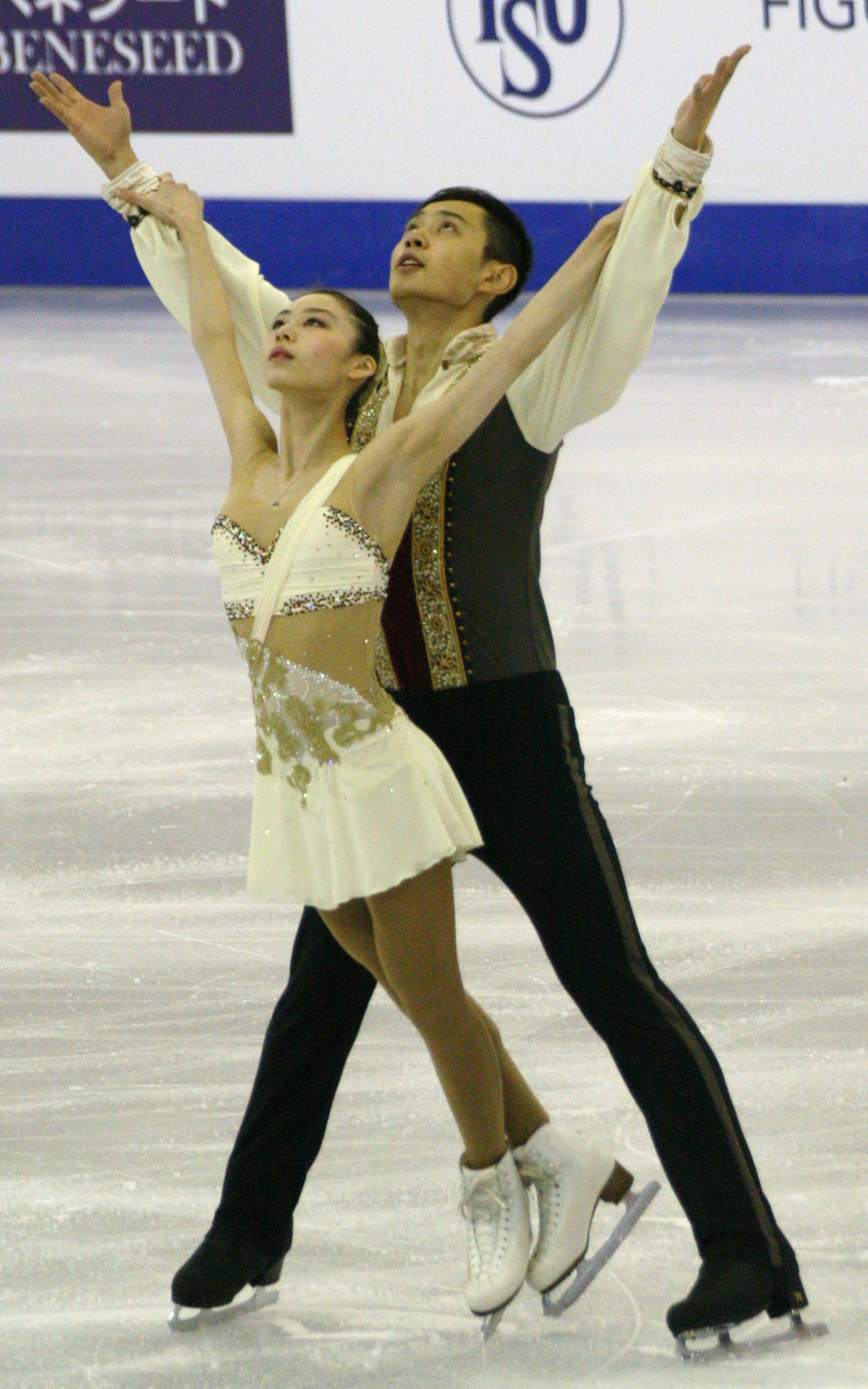
Yu Xiaoyu and Jin Yang scored three world junior records during their career.

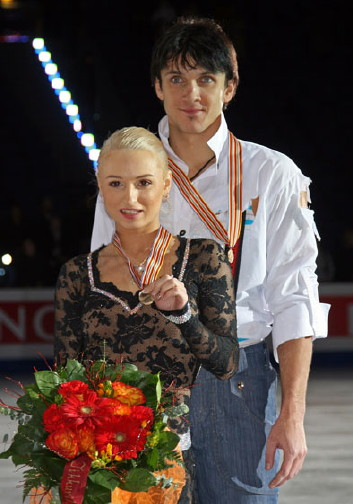
Maria Mukhortova and Maxim Trankov scored four world junior records during their career.

This list begins with the team who first scored above 160 points.

Progression of junior pairs' combined total record score
Date	Team	Nation	Score	Event
October 3, 2009	Sui Wenjing; Han Cong	China	164.84	2009 JGP Germany
March 11, 2010	Sui Wenjing; Han Cong	China	170.71	2010 World Junior Championships
March 1, 2012	Sui Wenjing; Han Cong	China	175.69	2012 World Junior Championships
March 5, 2015	Julianne Séguin; Charlie Bilodeau	Canada	176.32	2015 World Junior Championships
March 5, 2015	Yu Xiaoyu; Jin Yang	China	178.79	2015 World Junior Championships
March 17, 2016	Anna Dušková; Martin Bidař	Czech Republic	181.82	2016 World Junior Championships

This list begins with the team who first scored above 60 points.

Progression of junior pairs' short program record score
Date	Team	Nation	Score	Event
March 10, 2010	Sui Wenjing; Han Cong	China	60.94	2010 World Junior Championships
October 10, 2013	Yu Xiaoyu; Jin Yang	China	62.25	2013 JGP Estonia
March 12, 2014	Yu Xiaoyu; Jin Yang	China	62.58	2014 World Junior Championships
March 16, 2016	Anna Dušková; Martin Bidař	Czech Republic	64.71	2016 World Junior Championships
September 29, 2016	Amina Atakhanova; Ilia Spiridonov	Russia	64.79	2016 JGP Estonia

This list begins with the team who first scored above 100 points.

Progression of junior pairs' free skating record score
Date	Team	Nation	Score	Event
February 28, 2007	Keauna McLaughlin; Rockne Brubaker	United States	101.72	2007 World Junior Championships
September 26, 2009	Sui Wenjing; Han Cong	China	101.88	2009 JGP Belarus
October 3, 2009	Sui Wenjing; Han Cong	China	107.44	2009 JGP Germany
March 11, 2010	Sui Wenjing; Han Cong	China	109.77	2010 World Junior Championships
October 8, 1010	Sui Wenjing; Han Cong	China	111.81	2010 JGP Germany
September 30, 2011	Sui Wenjing; Han Cong	China	118.54	2011 JGP Austria

=== Ice dance (2011–18) ===
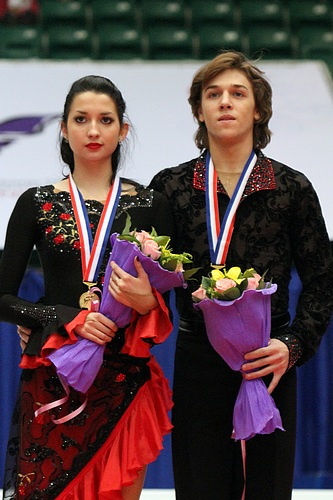
Ksenia Monko and Kirill Khaliavin scored 155.04 points at the 2010 JGP Great Britain.

This list begins with the team who first scored above 160 points.

Progression of junior ice dance combined total record score
Date	Team	Nation	Score	Event
September 26, 2015	Lorraine McNamara; Quinn Carpenter	United States	162.63	2015 JGP Poland
March 19, 2016	Rachel Parsons; Michael Parsons	United States	162.74	2016 World Junior Championships
March 19, 2016	Lorraine McNamara; Quinn Carpenter	United States	163.65	2016 World Junior Championships
March 18, 2017	Alla Loboda; Pavel Drozd	Russia	164.37	2017 World Junior Championships
March 18, 2017	Rachel Parsons; Michael Parsons	United States	164.83	2017 World Junior Championships

This list begins with the team who first scored above 65 points.

Progression of junior short dance record score
Date	Team	Nation	Score	Event
October 1, 2010	Ksenia Monko; Kirill Khaliavin	Russia	65.12	2010 JGP Great Britain
March 12, 2014	Kaitlin Hawayek; Jean-Luc Baker	United States	66.73	2014 World Junior Championships
March 17, 2016	Rachel Parsons; Michael Parsons	United States	67.88	2016 World Junior Championships

This list begins with the team who first scored above 90 points.

Progression of junior free dance record score
Date	Team	Nation	Score	Event
March 2, 2012	Victoria Sinitsina; Ruslan Zhiganshin	Russia	90.03	2012 World Junior Championships
March 14, 2014	Anna Yanovskaya; Sergey Mozgov	Russia	91.36	2014 World Junior Championships
September 27, 2014	Anna Yanovskaya; Sergey Mozgov	Russia	92.44	2014 JGP Estonia
March 7, 2015	Anna Yanovskaya; Sergey Mozgov	Russia	93.70	2015 World Junior Championships
September 26, 2015	Lorraine McNamara; Quinn Carpenter	United States	97.21	2015 JGP Poland
March 19, 2016	Lorraine McNamara; Quinn Carpenter	United States	97.40	2016 World Junior Championships
March 18, 2017	Rachel Parsons; Michael Parsons	United States	97.54	2017 World Junior Championships

=== Ice dance (2003–10) ===
Prior to the 2010–11 season, ice dance competitions included a compulsory dance and original dance in lieu of the short dance.

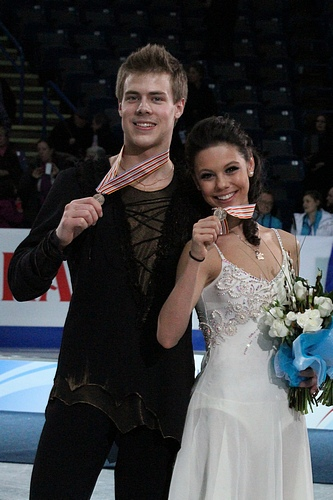
Elena Ilinykh and Nikita Katsalapov were the junior record holders of the eliminated original dance. At the time they were also the record holders of free dance and combined total scores.

This list begins with the team who first scored above 170 points.

Progression of junior ice dance combined total record score
Date	Team	Nation	Score	Event
October 9, 2004	Natalia Mikhailova; Arkadi Sergeev	Russia	170.00	2004 JGP Germany
October 15, 2004	Anastasia Platonova; Andrei Maximishin	Russia	170.54	2004 JGP Romania
December 4, 2004	Morgan Matthews; Maxim Zavozin	United States	171.30	2004–05 Junior Grand Prix Final
March 4, 2005	Tessa Virtue; Scott Moir	Canada	183.42	2005 World Junior Championships
March 4, 2005	Morgan Matthews; Maxim Zavozin	United States	187.51	2005 World Junior Championships
March 12, 2010	Elena Ilinykh; Nikita Katsalapov	Russia	188.28	2010 World Junior Championships

This list begins with the team who first scored above 30 points.

Progression of junior compulsory dance record score
Date	Team	Nation	Score	Event
August 25, 2004	Nelli Zhiganshina; Denis Bazdirev	Russia	31.97	2004 JGP France
August 25, 2004	Pernelle Carron; Edouard Dezutter	France	34.58	2004 JGP France
August 25, 2004	Tessa Virtue; Scott Moir	Canada	34.64	2004 JGP France
August 25, 2004	Morgan Matthews; Maxim Zavozin	United States	38.98	2004 JGP France
March 1, 2005	Morgan Matthews; Maxim Zavozin	United States	39.89	2005 World Junior Championships

This list begins with the team who first scored above 50 points.

Progression of junior original dance record score
Date	Team	Nation	Score	Event
August 28, 2004	Morgan Matthews; Maxim Zavozin	United States	53.92	2004 JGP France
March 3, 2005	Tessa Virtue; Scott Moir	Canada	58.33	2005 World Junior Championships
March 3, 2005	Morgan Matthews; Maxim Zavozin	United States	58.89	2005 World Junior Championships
September 9, 2005	Tessa Virtue; Scott Moir	Canada	59.72	2005 JGP Andorra
March 11, 2010	Elena Ilinykh; Nikita Katsalapov	Russia	59.94	2010 World Junior Championships

This list begins with the team who first scored above 80 points.

Progression of junior free dance record score
Date	Team	Nation	Score	Event
September 18, 2004	Tessa Virtue; Scott Moir	Canada	80.74	2004 JGP China
December 4, 2004	Tessa Virtue; Scott Moir	Canada	82.29	2004–05 Junior Grand Prix Final
March 4, 2005	Tessa Virtue; Scott Moir	Canada	88.18	2005 World Junior Championships
March 4, 2005	Morgan Matthews; Maxim Zavozin	United States	88.73	2005 World Junior Championships
March 12, 2010	Elena Ilinykh; Nikita Katsalapov	Russia	90.82	2010 World Junior Championships

== Highest personal best technical element scores ==
=== Men's singles ===
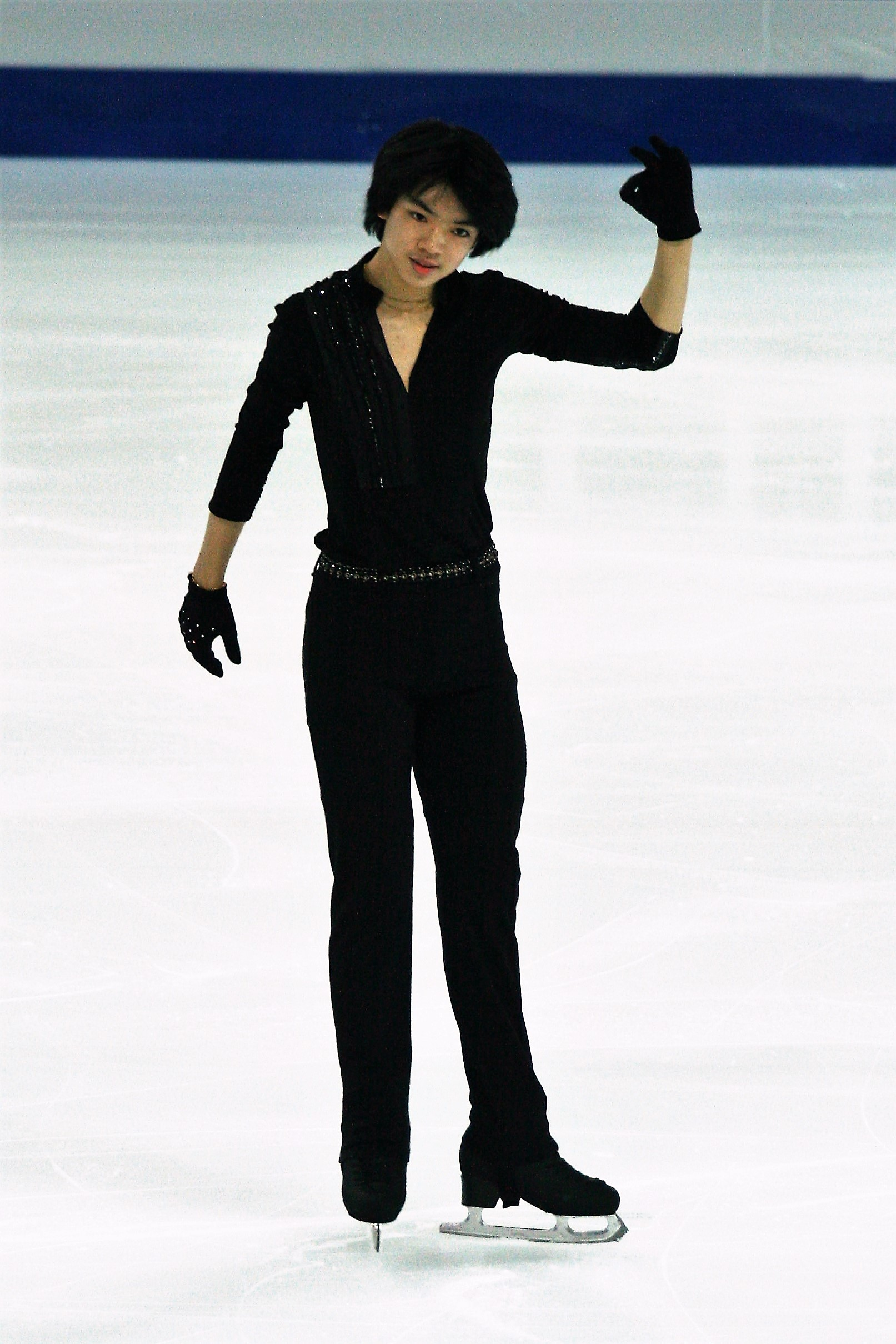
Cha Jun-hwan had the second highest technical element scores in the men's short program.

Top 10 personal best technical element scores in the men's short program
No.	Skater	Nation	Score	Event
1	Shoma Uno	Japan	46.81	2015 World Junior Championships
2	Cha Jun-hwan	South Korea	45.27	2017 World Junior Championships
3	Alexei Krasnozhon	United States	45.26	2017–18 Junior Grand Prix Final
4	Alexander Samarin	Russia	44.66	2017 World Junior Championships
5	Vincent Zhou	United States	44.60	2016 JGP Japan
6	Dmitri Aliev	Russia	44.51	2017 World Junior Championships
7	Alexander Petrov	Russia	43.97	2017 World Junior Championships
8	Nicolas Nadeau	Canada	43.84	2015 JGP Croatia
9	Alexey Erokhov	Russia	43.55	2017 JGP Poland
10	Sōta Yamamoto	Japan	43.46	2014–15 Junior Grand Prix Final

Top 10 personal best technical element scores in the men's free skate
No.	Skater	Nation	Score	Event
1	Vincent Zhou	United States	104.66	2017 World Junior Championships
2	Jin Boyang	China	90.81	2015 World Junior Championships
3	Daniel Samohin	Israel	90.68	2016 World Junior Championships
4	Shoma Uno	Japan	89.92	2014–15 Junior Grand Prix Final
5	Nathan Chen	United States	88.69	2015 JGP United States
6	Alexander Samarin	Russia	88.16	2017 World Junior Championships
7	Sōta Yamamoto	Japan	86.74	2015 JGP Poland
8	Alexander Petrov	Russia	86.48	2017 World Junior Championships
9	Cha Jun-hwan	South Korea	85.59	2017 World Junior Championships
10	Alexey Erokhov	Russia	85.36	2018 World Junior Championships

=== Women's singles ===
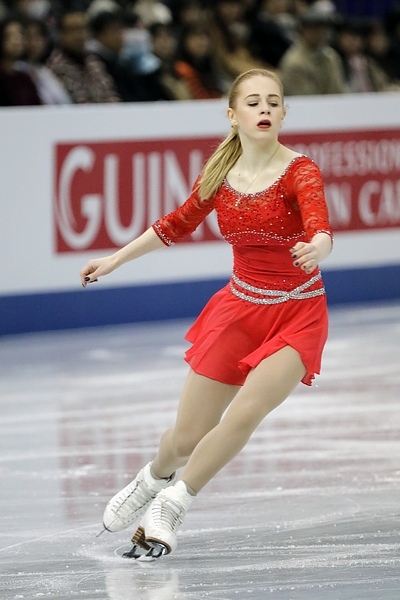
Daria Panenkova had the 5th hightest technical element scores in both the women's short program and free skate.

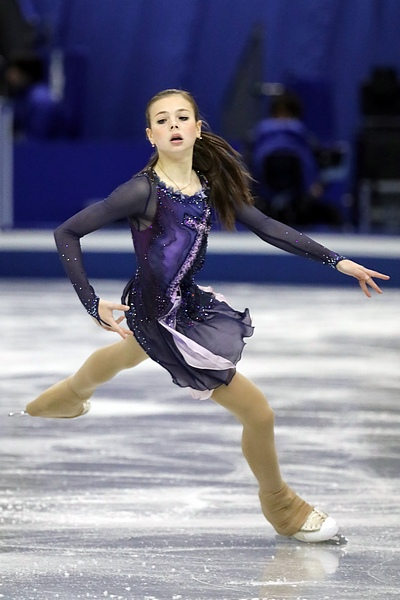
Anastasia Tarakanova had the fourth highest technical element scores in the women'sfree skate.

Top 10 personal best technical element scores in the women's short program
No.	Skater	Nation	Score	Event
1	Alexandra Trusova	Russia	42.96	2017–18 Junior Grand Prix Final
2	Alena Kostornaia	Russia	41.54	2018 World Junior Championships
3	Alina Zagitova	Russia	41.41	2017 World Junior Championships
4	Serafima Sakhanovich	Russia	40.20	2014 JGP Slovenia
5	Daria Panenkova	Russia	39.70	2017 JGP Latvia
6	Polina Tsurskaya	Russia	39.60	2016 JGP Russia
7	Anastasia Tarakanova	Russia	39.56	2017–18 Junior Grand Prix Final
8	Evgenia Medvedeva	Russia	39.50	2015 World Junior Championships
9	Elena Radionova	Russia	39.04	2014 World Junior Championships
10	Rika Kihira	Japan	38.81	2016 JGP Czech Republic

Top 10 personal best technical element scores in the women's free skate
No.	Skater	Nation	Score	Event
1	Alexandra Trusova	Russia	92.35	2018 World Junior Championships
2	Alina Zagitova	Russia	75.81	2017 World Junior Championships
3	Alena Kostornaia	Russia	73.65	2018 World Junior Championships
4	Anastasia Tarakanova	Russia	72.99	2017–18 Junior Grand Prix Final
5	Daria Panenkova	Russia	72.91	2017 JGP Poland
6	Rika Kihira	Japan	71.74	2016 JGP Slovenia
7	Anastasiia Gubanova	Russia	71.27	2016–17 Junior Grand Prix Final
8	Marin Honda	Japan	70.68	2017 World Junior Championships
9	Mako Yamashita	Japan	70.27	2018 World Junior Championships
10	Yuhana Yokoi	Japan	69.99	2018 World Junior Championships

=== Pairs ===
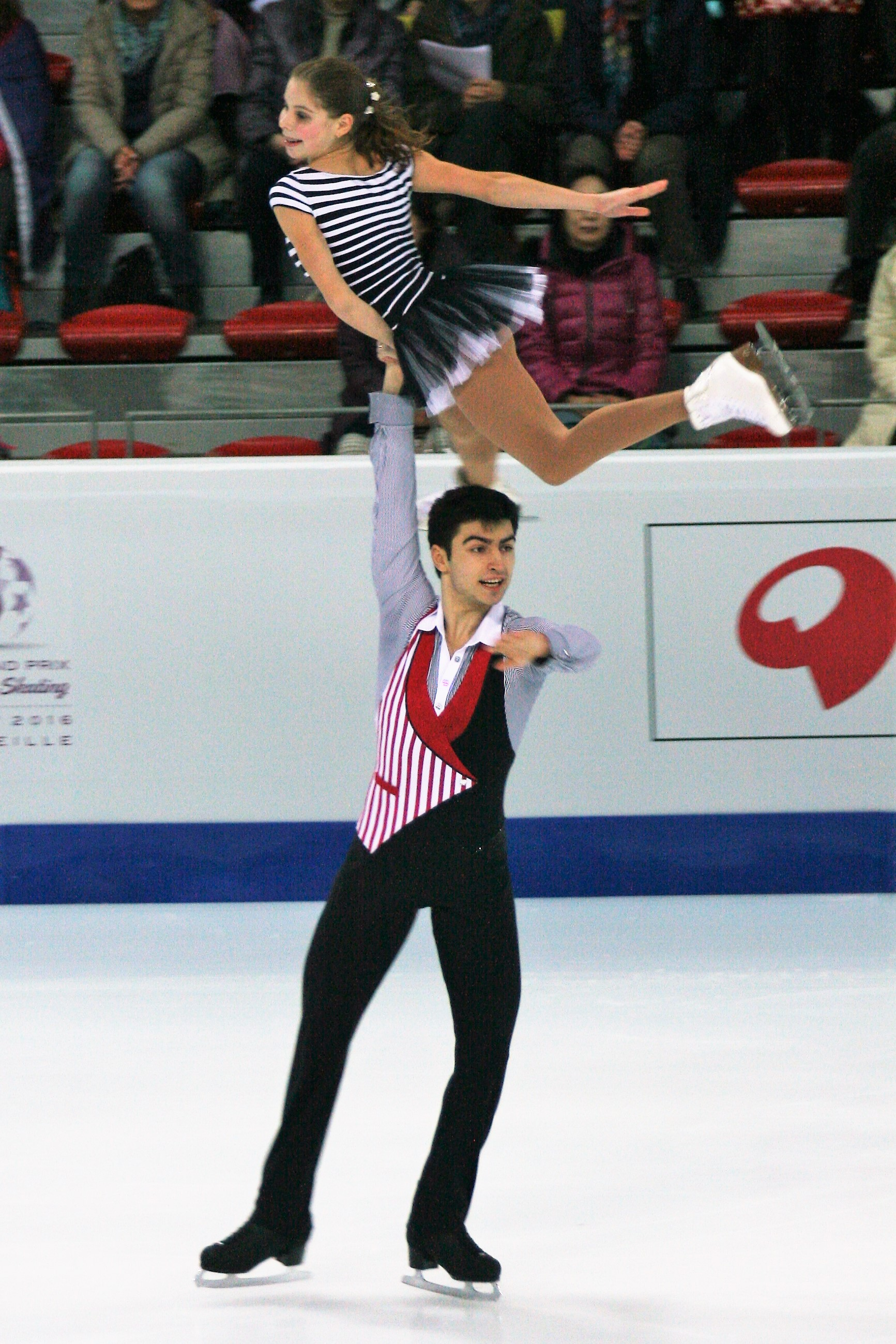
Anastasia Mishina and Vladislav Mirzoev had the second highest technical element scores in the pairs' short program.

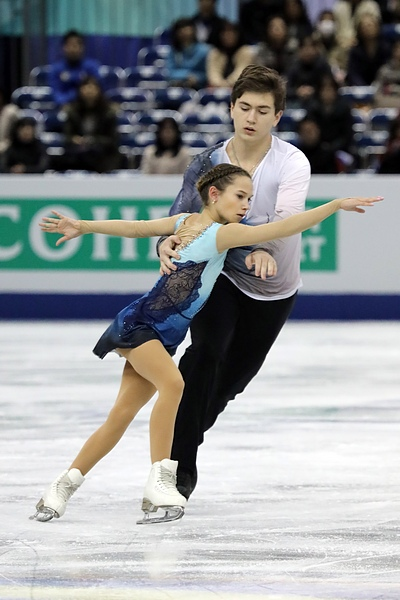
Daria Pavliuchenko and Denis Khodykin had the second highest technical element scores in the pairs' free skate.

Top 10 personal best technical element scores in the pairs' short program
No.	Team	Nation	Score	Event
1	Amina Atakhanova; Ilia Spiridonov	Russia	38.81	2016 JGP Estonia
2	Anastasia Mishina; Vladislav Mirzoev	Russia	38.18	2016 JGP Russia
3	Anna Dušková; Martin Bidař	Czech Republic	36.87	2016 World Junior Championships
4	Sui Wenjing; Han Cong	China	36.46	2010 World Junior Championships
4	Narumi Takahashi; Mervin Tran	Japan	36.46	2010 World Junior Championships
6	Daria Pavliuchenko; Denis Khodykin	Russia	36.23	2018 World Junior Championships
7	Aleksandra Boikova; Dmitrii Kozlovskii	Russia	35.89	2017 World Junior Championships
8	Polina Kostiukovich; Dmitrii Ialin	Russia	35.54	2018 World Junior Championships
9	Yu Xiaoyu; Jin Yang	China	35.51	2014 World Junior Championships
10	Vasilisa Davankova; Andrei Deputat	Russia	34.87	2013 JGP Estonia

Top 10 personal best technical element scores in the pairs' free skate
No.	Team	Nation	Score	Event
1	Sui Wenjing; Han Cong	China	62.76	2011 JGP Austria
2	Daria Pavliuchenko; Denis Khodykin	Russia	62.28	2018 World Junior Championships
3	Yu Xiaoyu; Jin Yang	China	61.10	2012 World Junior Championships
4	Anna Dušková; Martin Bidař	Czech Republic	59.05	2016 World Junior Championships
5	Ekaterina Alexandrovskaya; Harley Windsor	Australia	58.98	2017–18 Junior Grand Prix Final
6	Polina Kostiukovich; Dmitrii Ialin	Russia	58.49	2017 JGP Croatia
7	Anastasia Mishina; Vladislav Mirzoev	Russia	58.35	2016–17 Junior Grand Prix Final
8	Anastasia Mishina; Aleksandr Galiamov	Russia	58.28	2018 World Junior Championships
9	Julianne Séguin; Charlie Bilodeau	Canada	57.84	2015 World Junior Championships
10	Maria Vigalova; Egor Zakroev	Russia	57.48	2013 JGP Slovakia

=== Ice dance ===
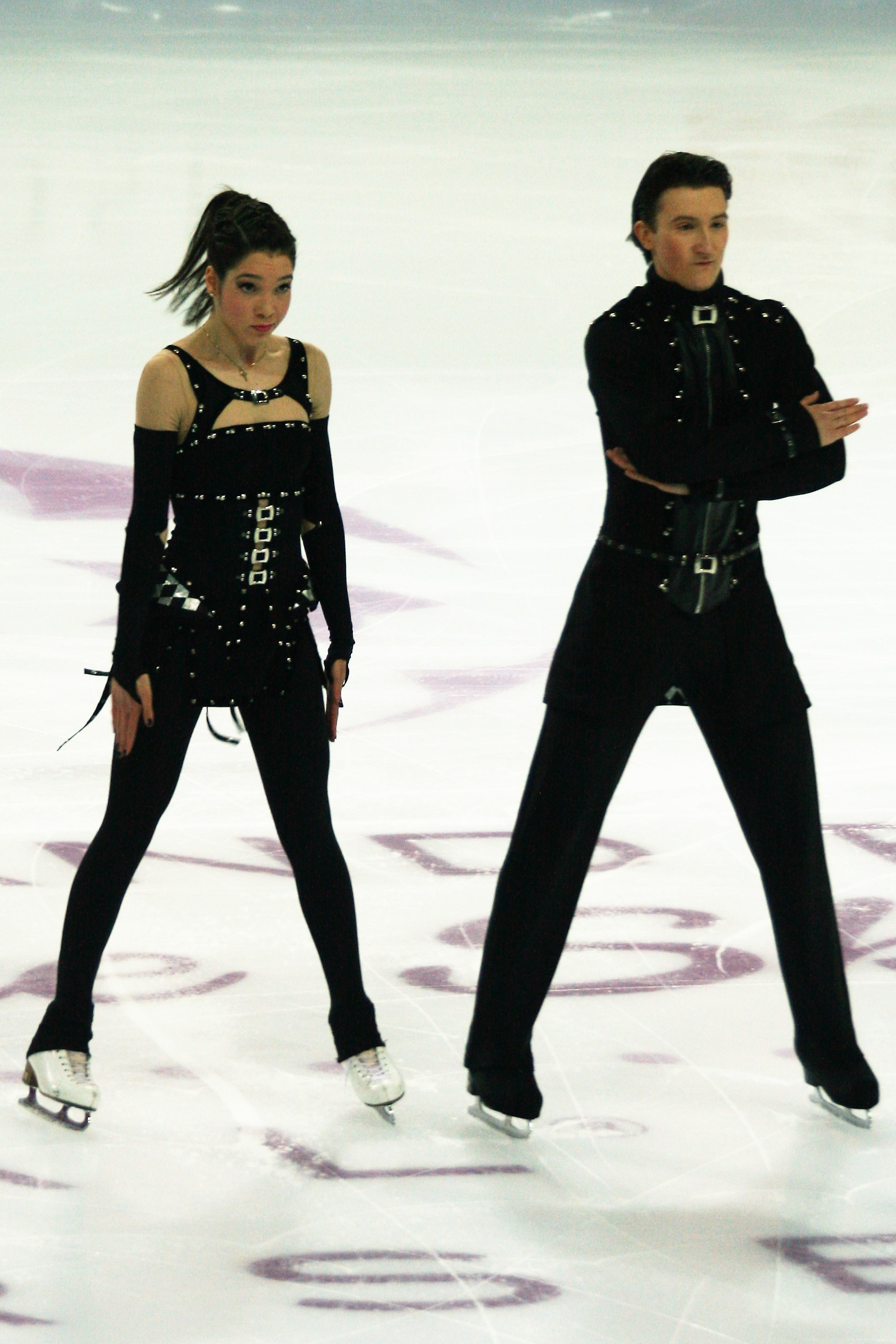
Lorraine McNamara and Quinn Carpenter had the highest technical element score in the free dance.

Top 10 personal best technical element scores in the short dance
No.	Team	Nation	Score	Event
1	Kaitlin Hawayek; Jean-Luc Baker	United States	36.86	2014 World Junior Championships
2	Rachel Parsons; Michael Parsons	United States	36.66	2016 World Junior Championships
3	Ksenia Monko; Kirill Khaliavin	Russia	36.16	2010 JGP Great Britain
4	Lorraine McNamara; Quinn Carpenter	United States	35.85	2015 JGP United States
5	Anastasia Skoptsova; Kirill Aleshin	Russia	34.99	2017–18 Junior Grand Prix Final
6	Alla Loboda; Pavel Drozd	Russia	34.93	2017 World Junior Championships
7	Alexandra Stepanova; Ivan Bukin	Russia	34.71	2013 World Junior Championships
8	Victoria Sinitsina; Ruslan Zhiganshin	Russia	34.29	2012 World Junior Championships
9	Anna Yanovskaya; Sergey Mozgov	Russia	33.86	2013–14 Junior Grand Prix Final
10	Marjorie Lajoie; Zachary Lagha	Canada	33.35	2017 JGP Croatia

Top 10 personal best technical element scores in the free dance
No.	Team	Nation	Score	Event
1	Lorraine McNamara; Quinn Carpenter	United States	47.85	2016 World Junior Championships
2	Rachel Parsons; Michael Parsons	United States	47.27	2017 World Junior Championships
3	Alla Loboda; Pavel Drozd	Russia	47.23	2017 World Junior Championships
4	Christina Carreira; Anthony Ponomarenko	United States	46.11	2017 World Junior Championships
5	Angélique Abachkina; Louis Thauron	France	45.15	2016 JGP France
6	Marie-Jade Lauriault; Romain Le Gac	France	45.06	2015 JGP Spain
7	Anna Yanovskaya; Sergey Mozgov	Russia	45.02	2015 World Junior Championships
8	Ksenia Monko; Kirill Khaliavin	Russia	44.83	2010 JGP Great Britain
9	Sofia Polishchuk; Alexander Vakhnov	Russia	44.76	2016 JGP Slovenia
10	Anastasia Shpilevaya; Grigory Smirnov	Russia	44.30	2016 JGP Japan

== Highest personal best program component scores ==
=== Men's singles ===
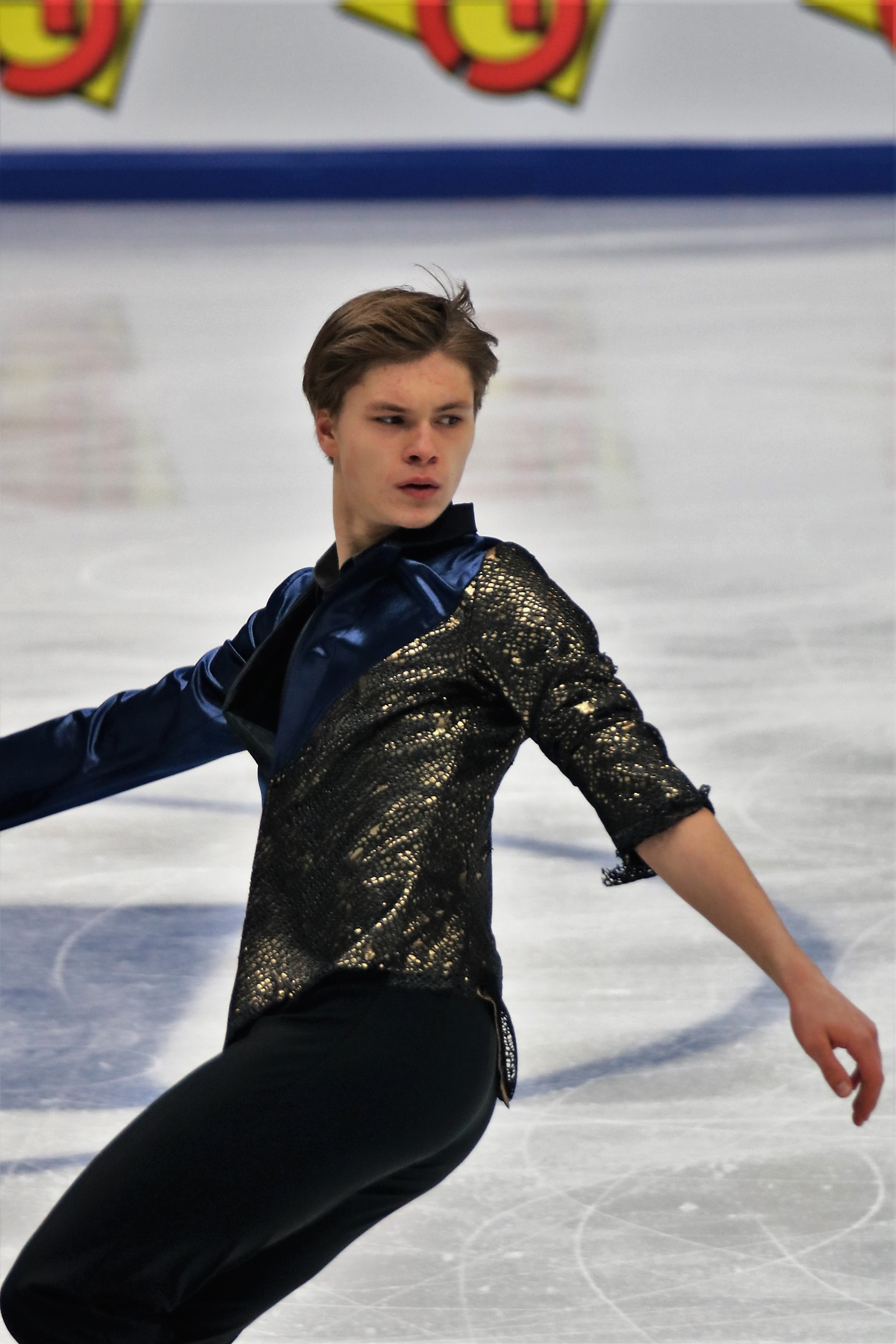
Deniss Vasiļjevs had the third highest program component scores in the men's short program.

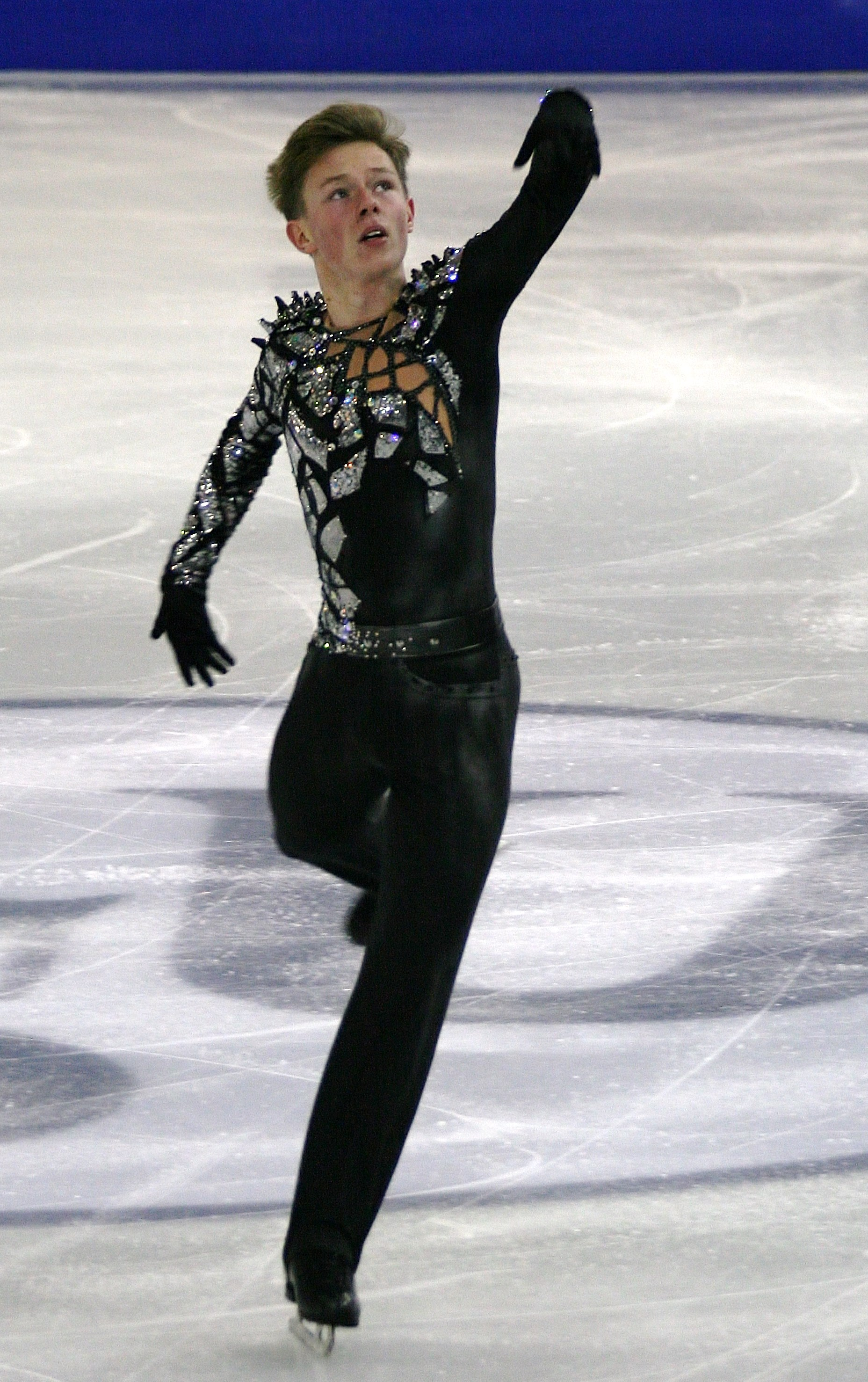
Alexander Petrov had the fourth highest program component scores in the men's free skate.

Top 10 personal best program component scores in the men's short program
No.	Skater	Nation	Score	Event
1	Dmitri Aliev	Russia	38.97	2017 World Junior Championships
2	Shoma Uno	Japan	38.06	2015 World Junior Championships
3	Deniss Vasiļjevs	Latvia	38.00	2016 World Junior Championships
4	Alexander Samarin	Russia	37.57	2017 World Junior Championships
5	Alexander Petrov	Russia	37.32	2017 World Junior Championships
6	Nathan Chen	United States	37.11	2015–16 Junior Grand Prix Final
7	Cha Jun-hwan	South Korea	37.07	2017 World Junior Championships
8	Daniel Samohin	Israel	36.67	2017 World Junior Championships
9	Andrew Torgashev	United States	36.36	2017 JGP Belarus
10	Alexei Krasnozhon	United States	36.07	2017–18 Junior Grand Prix Final

Top 10 personal best program component scores in the men's free skate
No.	Skater	Nation	Score	Event
1	Dmitri Aliev	Russia	79.58	2017 World Junior Championships
2	Daniel Samohin	Israel	76.42	2017 World Junior Championships
3	Shoma Uno	Japan	76.34	2015 World Junior Championships
4	Alexander Petrov	Russia	75.70	2017 World Junior Championships
5	Cha Jun-hwan	South Korea	75.52	2017 World Junior Championships
6	Alexander Samarin	Russia	75.14	2017 World Junior Championships
7	Vincent Zhou	United States	74.58	2017 World Junior Championships
8	Nicolas Nadeau	Canada	74.06	2016 World Junior Championships
9	Kévin Aymoz	France	73.80	2017 World Junior Championships
10	Deniss Vasiļjevs	Latvia	73.64	2016 World Junior Championships

=== Women's singles ===
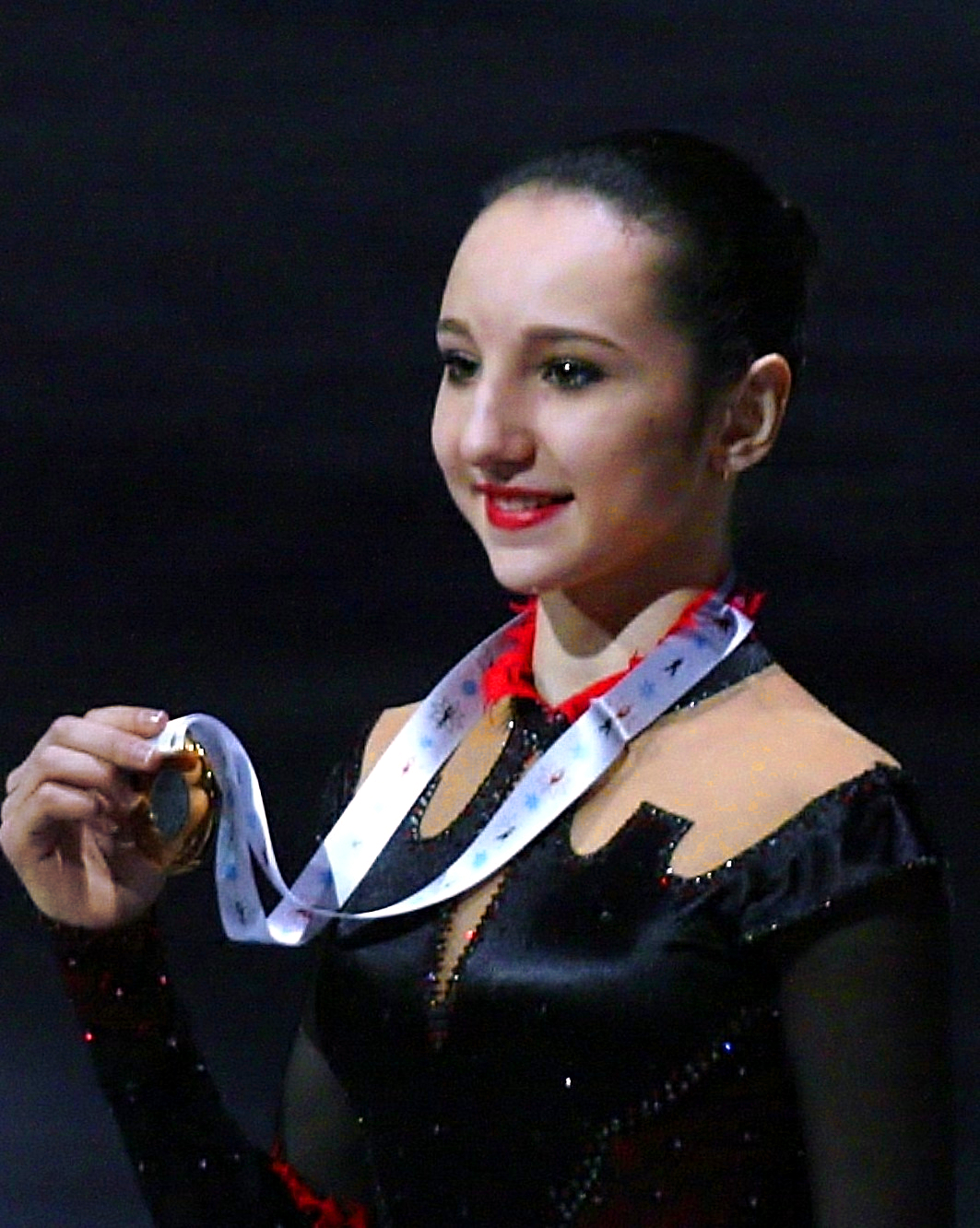
Polina Tsurskaya had the fifth highest program component scores in the women's short program.

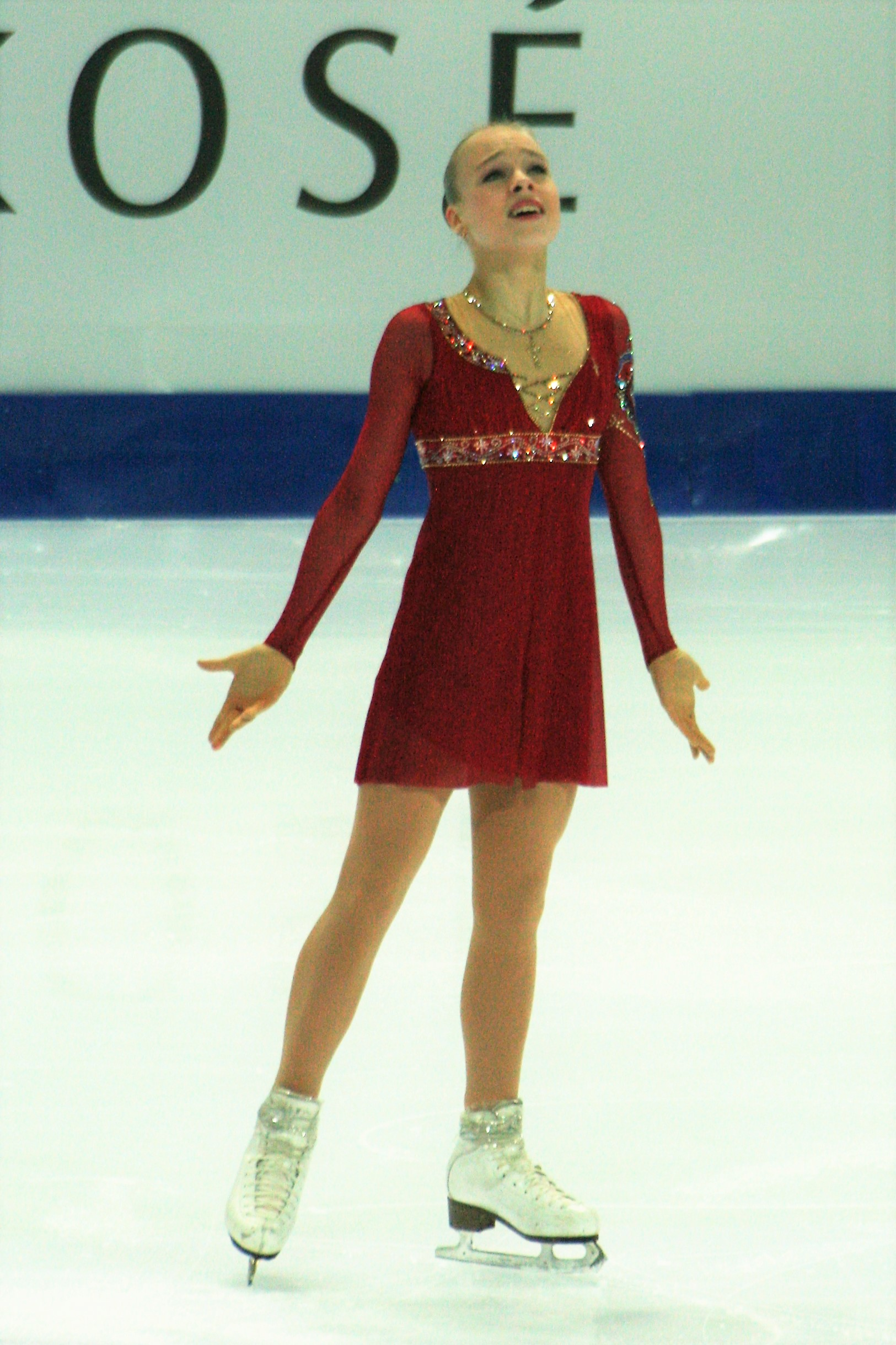
Anastasiia Gubanova had the third highest program component scores in the women's free skate.

Top 10 personal best program component scores in the women's short program
No.	Skater	Nation	Score	Event
1	Alexandra Trusova	Russia	30.29	2017–18 Junior Grand Prix Final
2	Alena Kostornaia	Russia	30.23	2017–18 Junior Grand Prix Final
3	Alina Zagitova	Russia	29.80	2016–17 Junior Grand Prix Final
4	Marin Honda	Japan	29.73	2017 World Junior Championships
5	Polina Tsurskaya	Russia	29.42	2016 JGP Russia
6	Anastasiia Gubanova	Russia	29.40	2016–17 Junior Grand Prix Final
7	Kaori Sakamoto	Japan	29.19	2017 World Junior Championships
8	Evgenia Medvedeva	Russia	28.98	2015 World Junior Championships
9	Rika Kihira	Japan	28.86	2018 World Junior Championships
10	Stanislava Konstantinova	Russia	28.64	2018 World Junior Championships

No.	Skater	Nation	Score	Event
1	Alina Zagitova	Russia	62.67	2016–17 Junior Grand Prix Final
2	Marin Honda	Japan	62.58	2017 World Junior Championships
3	Anastasiia Gubanova	Russia	62.50	2016–17 Junior Grand Prix Final
4	Alena Kostornaia	Russia	62.11	2018 World Junior Championships
5	Alexandra Trusova	Russia	61.14	2018 World Junior Championships
6	Polina Tsurskaya	Russia	60.17	2016 JGP Estonia
7	Kaori Sakamoto	Japan	60.06	2017 World Junior Championships
8	Elena Radionova	Russia	59.70	2014 World Junior Championships
9	Anastasia Tarakanova	Russia	59.45	2017 JGP Austria
10	Evgenia Medvedeva	Russia	59.21	2015 World Junior Championships

=== Pairs ===
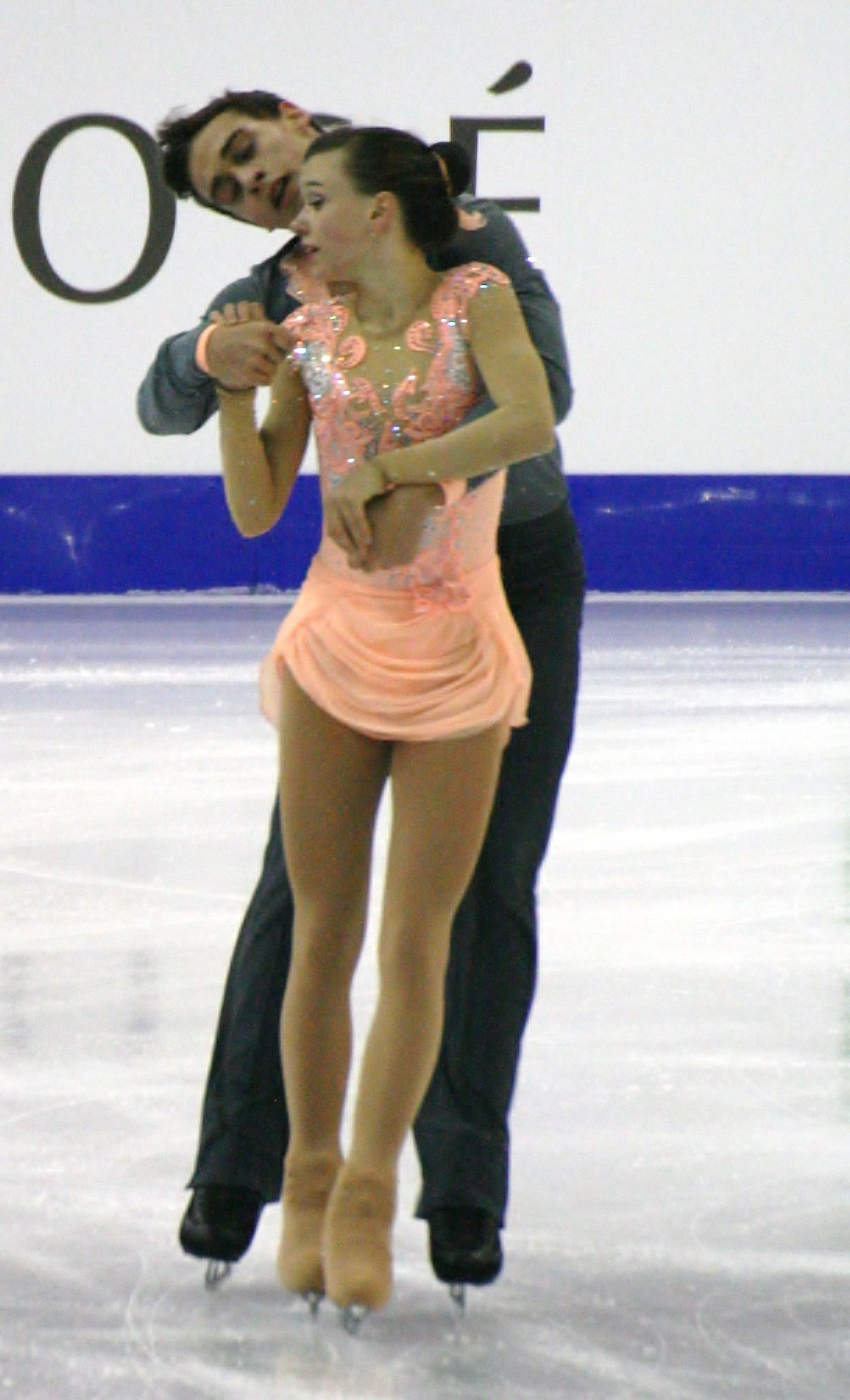
Anna Dušková and Martin Bidař had the second highest program component scores in the pairs' short program and the third highest scores in the pairs' free skate.

Top 10 personal best program component scores in the pairs' short program
No.	Team	Nation	Score	Event
1	Yu Xiaoyu; Jin Yang	China	28.92	2015 World Junior Championships
2	Anna Dušková; Martin Bidař	Czech Republic	27.84	2016 World Junior Championships
3	Julianne Séguin; Charlie Bilodeau	Canada	27.72	2015 World Junior Championships
4	Anastasia Mishina; Vladislav Mirzoev	Russia	27.54	2016–17 Junior Grand Prix Final
5	Amina Atakhanova; Ilia Spiridonov	Russia	27.48	2015–16 Junior Grand Prix Final
6	Daria Pavliuchenko; Denis Khodykin	Russia	27.25	2017–18 Junior Grand Prix Final
7	Ekaterina Alexandrovskaya; Harley Windsor	Australia	27.13	2017–18 Junior Grand Prix Final
8	Lina Fedorova; Maxim Miroshkin	Russia	26.91	2014 JGP Germany
9	Ekaterina Borisova; Dmitry Sopot	Russia	26.76	2016 World Junior Championships
10	Gao Yumeng; Xie Zhong	China	26.74	2018 World Junior Championships

Top 10 personal best program component scores in the pairs' free skate
No.	Team	Nation	Score	Event
1	Julianne Séguin; Charlie Bilodeau	Canada	59.25	2014–15 Junior Grand Prix Final
2	Yu Xiaoyu; Jin Yang	China	58.24	2015 World Junior Championships
3	Anna Dušková; Martin Bidař	Czech Republic	58.06	2016 World Junior Championships
4	Anastasia Mishina; Vladislav Mirzoev	Russia	57.55	2016–17 Junior Grand Prix Final
5	Ekaterina Borisova; Dmitry Sopot	Russia	56.24	2015–16 Junior Grand Prix Final
6	Sui Wenjing; Han Cong	China	56.12	2012 World Junior Championships
7	Amina Atakhanova; Ilia Spiridonov	Russia	55.71	2015–16 Junior Grand Prix Final
8	Ekaterina Alexandrovskaya; Harley Windsor	Australia	55.61	2017–18 Junior Grand Prix Final
9	Apollinariia Panfilova; Dmitry Rylov	Russia	55.51	2017–18 Junior Grand Prix Final
10	Maria Vigalova; Egor Zakroev	Russia	55.36	2014 JGP Croatia

=== Ice dance ===
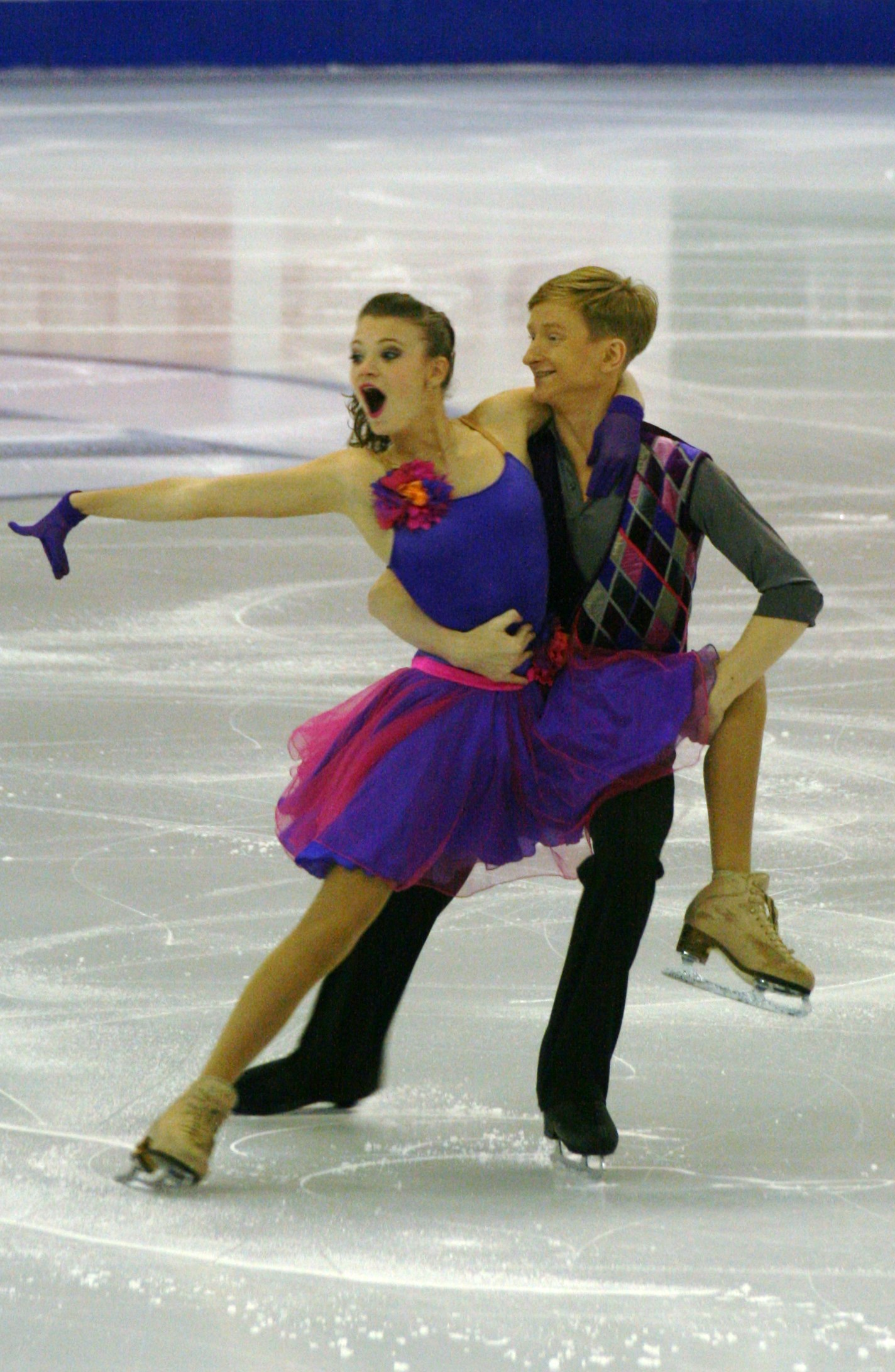
Anastasia Skoptsova and Kirill Aleshin had the fourth highest program component scores in the short dance.

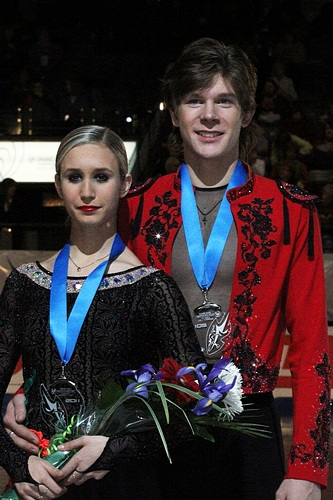
Anna Yanovskaya and Sergey Mozgov had the fourth highest program component scores in the free dance.

Top 10 personal best program component scores in the short dance
No.	Team	Nation	Score	Event
1	Alla Loboda; Pavel Drozd	Russia	32.72	2016–17 Junior Grand Prix Final
2	Rachel Parsons; Michael Parsons	United States	32.44	2017 World Junior Championships
3	Lorraine McNamara; Quinn Carpenter	United States	32.34	2016 JGP Czech Republic
4	Anastasia Skoptsova; Kirill Aleshin	Russia	31.76	2018 World Junior Championships
5	Christina Carreira; Anthony Ponomarenko	United States	31.51	2017–18 Junior Grand Prix Final
6	Anna Yanovskaya; Sergey Mozgov	Russia	31.08	2014 JGP Croatia
7	Sofia Shevchenko; Igor Eremenko	Russia	30.09	2018 World Junior Championships
8	Anastasia Shpilevaya; Grigory Smirnov	Russia	29.97	2017 World Junior Championships
9	Alexandra Stepanova; Ivan Bukin	Russia	29.94	2013 World Junior Championships
10	Sofia Polishchuk; Alexander Vakhnov	Russia	29.89	2017–18 Junior Grand Prix Final

Top 10 personal best program component scores in the free dance
No.	Team	Nation	Score	Event
1	Rachel Parsons; Michael Parsons	United States	50.27	2017 World Junior Championships
2	Alla Loboda; Pavel Drozd	Russia	49.86	2016 JGP Russia
3	Lorraine McNamara; Quinn Carpenter	United States	49.81	2015 JGP Poland
4	Anna Yanovskaya; Sergey Mozgov	Russia	48.68	2015 World Junior Championships
5	Christina Carreira; Anthony Ponomarenko	United States	48.47	2018 World Junior Championships
6	Anastasia Skoptsova; Kirill Aleshin	Russia	48.22	2018 World Junior Championships
7	Betina Popova; Yuri Vlasenko	Russia	47.07	2015 JGP Spain
8	Victoria Sinitsina; Ruslan Zhiganshin	Russia	46.88	2012 World Junior Championships
9	Arina Ushakova; Maxim Nekrasov	Russia	46.62	2018 World Junior Championships
10	Sofia Shevchenko; Igor Eremenko	Russia	46.59	2017 JGP Croatia

== Highest scores achieved at major international events ==
=== World Junior Championships ===
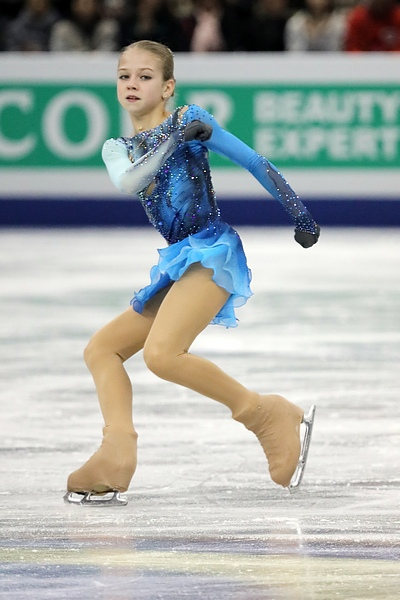
Alexandra Trusova scored 225.52 points at the 2018 World Junior Championships.

Top component scores in men's singles at the World Junior Championships
Component	Skater	Nation	Score	Event
Short program	Shoma Uno	Japan	84.87	2015 World Junior Championships
Free skate	Vincent Zhou	United States	179.24	2017 World Junior Championships
Combined total	Vincent Zhou	United States	258.11	2017 World Junior Championships

Top component scores in women's singles at the World Junior Championships
Component	Skater	Nation	Score	Event
Short program	Alexandra Trusova	Russia	72.03	2018 World Junior Championships
Free skate	Alexandra Trusova	Russia	153.49	2018 World Junior Championships
Combined total	Alexandra Trusova	Russia	225.52	2018 World Junior Championships

Top component scores in pair skating at the World Junior Championships
Component	Team	Nation	Score	Event
Short program	Anna Dušková; Martin Bidař	Czech Republic	64.71	2016 World Junior Championships
Free skate	Daria Pavliuchenko; Denis Khodykin	Russia	117.41	2018 World Junior Championships
Combined total	Anna Dušková; Martin Bidař	Czech Republic	181.82	2016 World Junior Championships

Top component scores in ice dance at the World Junior Championships
Component	Team	Nation	Score	Event
Short dance	Rachel Parsons; Michael Parsons	United States	67.88	2016 World Junior Championships
Free dance	Rachel Parsons; Michael Parsons	United States	97.54	2017 World Junior Championships
Combined total	Rachel Parsons; Michael Parsons	United States	164.83	2017 World Junior Championships

=== Winter Youth Olympics ===
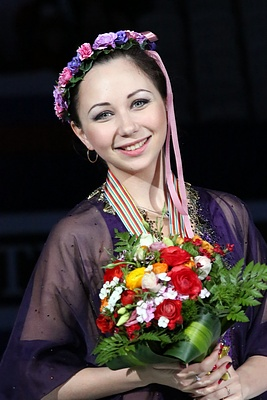
Elizaveta Tuktamysheva scored 61.83 points in the short program at the 2012 Winter Youth Olympics.

Top component scores in men's singles at the Winter Youth Olympics
Component	Skater	Nation	Score	Event
Short program	Sōta Yamamoto	Japan	73.07	2016 Winter Youth Olympics
Free skate	Deniss Vasiļjevs	Latvia	144.27	2016 Winter Youth Olympics
Combined total	Sōta Yamamoto	Japan	215.52	2016 Winter Youth Olympics

Top component scores in women's singles at the Winter Youth Olympics
Component	Skater	Nation	Score	Event
Short program	Elizaveta Tuktamysheva	Russia	61.83	2012 Winter Youth Olympics
Free skate	Polina Tsurskaya	Russia	127.39	2016 Winter Youth Olympics
Combined total	Polina Tsurskaya	Russia	186.04	2016 Winter Youth Olympics

Top component scores in pair skating at the Winter Youth Olympics
Component	Team	Nation	Score	Event
Short program	Anna Dušková; Martin Bidař	Czech Republic	61.82	2016 Winter Youth Olympics
Free skate	Ekaterina Borisova; Dmitry Sopot	Russia	107.86	2016 Winter Youth Olympics
Combined total	Ekaterina Borisova; Dmitry Sopot	Russia	168.66	2016 Winter Youth Olympics

Top component scores in ice dance at the Winter Youth Olympics
Component	Team	Nation	Score	Event
Short dance	Anna Yanovskaya; Sergey Mozgov	Russia	60.19	2012 Winter Youth Olympics
Free dance	Anna Yanovskaya; Sergey Mozgov	Russia	86.77	2012 Winter Youth Olympics
Combined total	Anna Yanovskaya; Sergey Mozgov	Russia	146.96	2012 Winter Youth Olympics

=== Junior Grand Prix Final ===
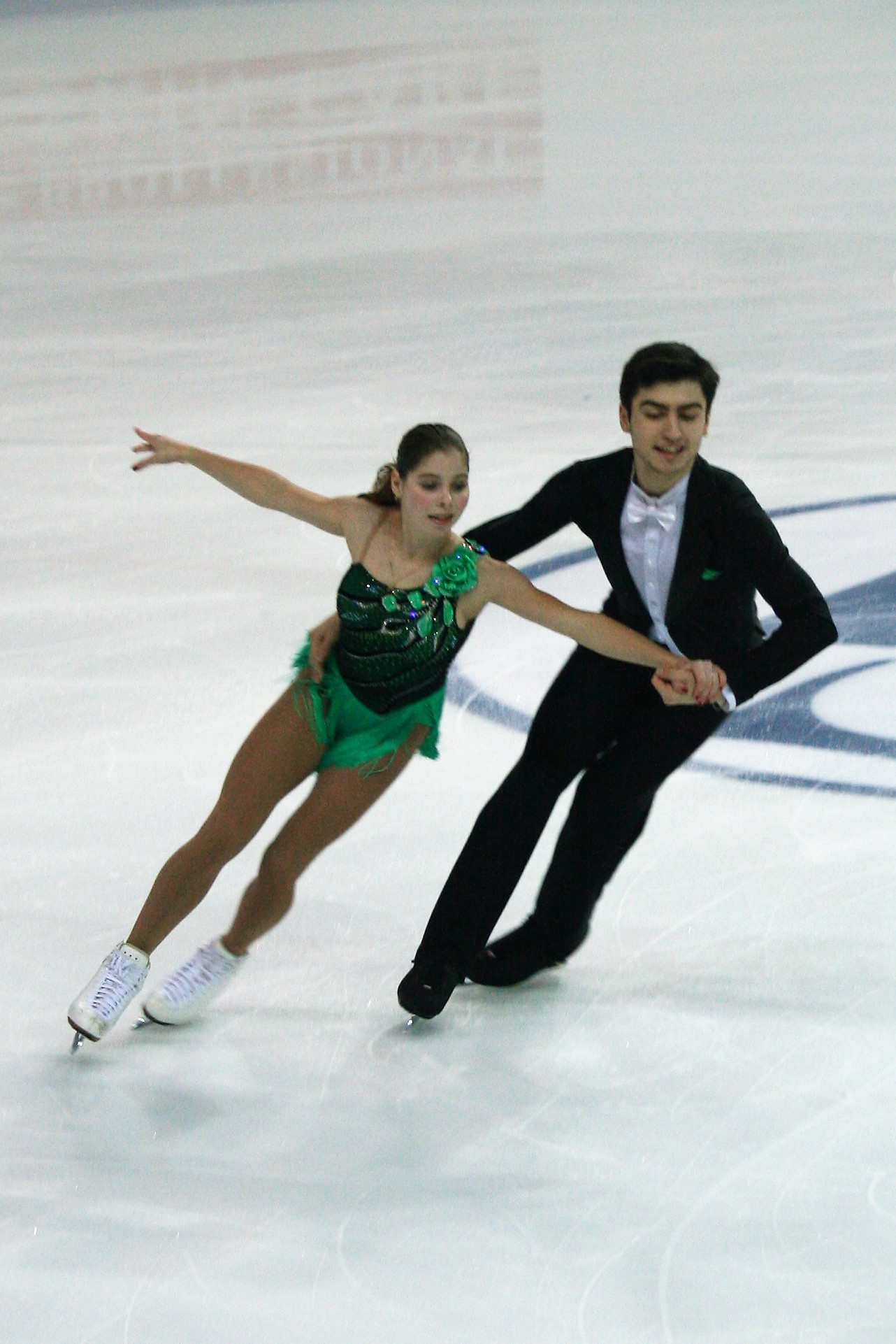
Anastasia Mishina and Vladislav Mirzoev scored 180.63 points at the 2016–17 Junior Grand Prix Final, which was the highest score that had ever been scored at a Junior Grand Prix Final.

Top component scores in men's singles at the Junior Grand Prix Final
Component	Skater	Nation	Score	Event
Short program	Dmitri Aliev	Russia	81.37	2016–17 Junior Grand Prix Final
Free skate	Shoma Uno	Japan	163.06	2014–15 Junior Grand Prix Final
Combined total	Dmitri Aliev	Russia	240.07	2016–17 Junior Grand Prix Final

Top component scores in women's singles at the Junior Grand Prix Final
Component	Skater	Nation	Score	Event
Short program	Alexandra Trusova	Russia	73.25	2017–18 Junior Grand Prix Final
Free skate	Alina Zagitova	Russia	136.51	2016–17 Junior Grand Prix Final
Combined total	Alina Zagitova	Russia	207.43	2016–17 Junior Grand Prix Final

Top component scores in pair skating at the Junior Grand Prix Final
Component	Team	Nation	Score	Event
Short program	Anastasia Mishina; Vladislav Mirzoev	Russia	64.73	2016–17 Junior Grand Prix Final
Free skate	Julianne Séguin; Charlie Bilodeau	Canada	116.35	2014–15 Junior Grand Prix Final
Combined total	Anastasia Mishina; Vladislav Mirzoev	Russia	180.63	2016–17 Junior Grand Prix Final

Top component scores in ice dance at the Junior Grand Prix Final
Component	Team	Nation	Score	Event
Short dance	Alla Loboda; Pavel Drozd	Russia	67.58	2016–17 Junior Grand Prix Final
Free dance	Rachel Parsons; Michael Parsons	United States	95.59	2016–17 Junior Grand Prix Final
Combined total	Rachel Parsons; Michael Parsons	United States	162.50	2016–17 Junior Grand Prix Final

== See also ==
- List of highest scores in figure skating
- List of highest junior scores in figure skating
- List of highest historical scores in figure skating
- ISU Judging System
