= Anastasiia Gubanova =

Russian-Georgian figure skater (born 2002)

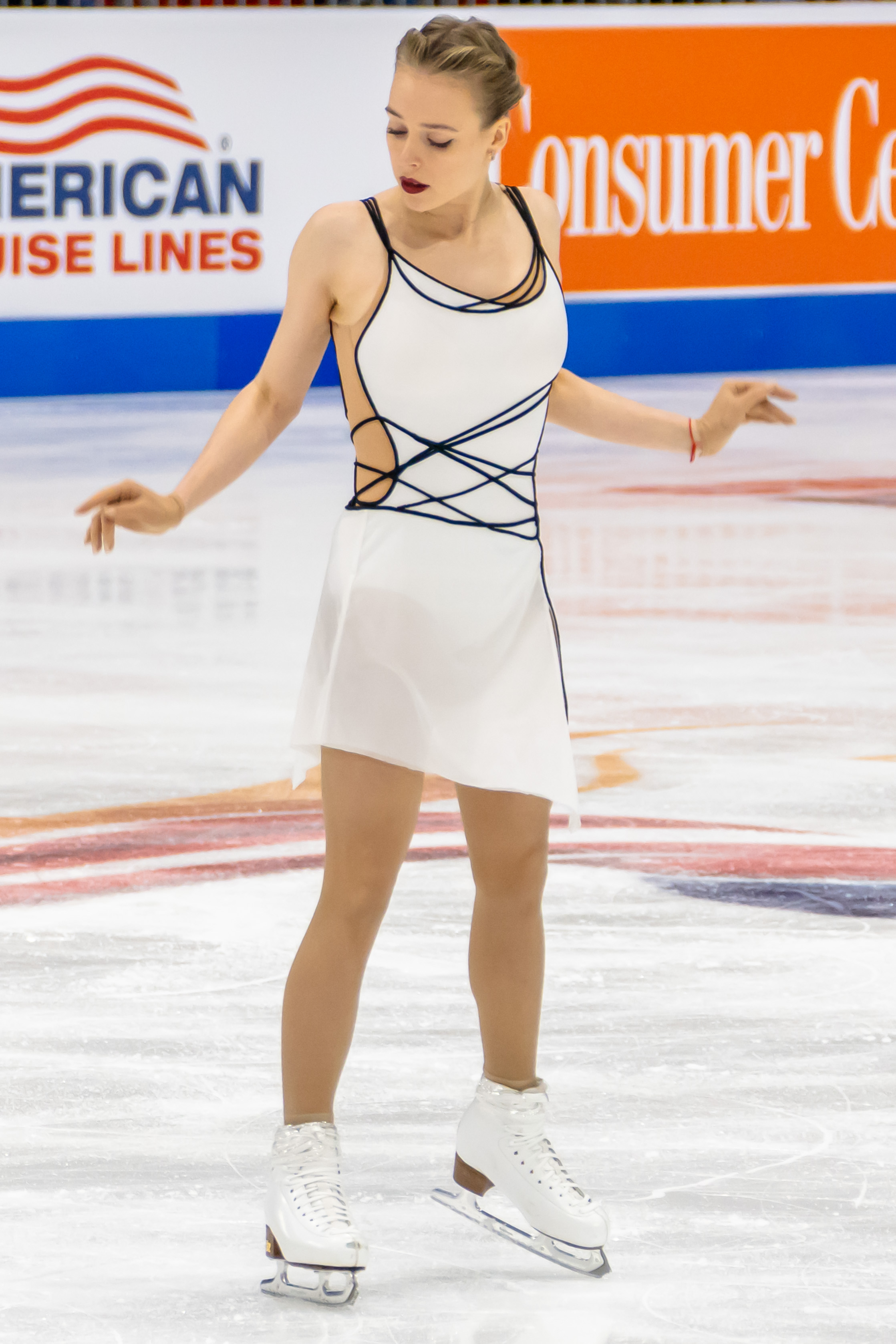
- Anastasiia Gubanova at 2025 Skate America

Personal information
- Native name: ანასტასია გუბანოვა (Georgian); Анастасия Витальевна Губанова (Russian)
- Full name: Anastasiia Vitalyevna Gubanova
- Other names: Anastasia Gubanova; Nastya
- Born: 2 December 2002 (age 23) Tolyatti, Russia
- Height: 1.58 m (5 ft 2 in)

Figure skating career
- Country: Georgia (since 2021); Russia (2013–20)
- Coach: Evgeni Rukavicin
- Skating club: St. Petersburg Figure Skating Academy
- Began skating: 2006

Medal record
Representing Georgia
European Championships
Gold medal – first place	2023 Espoo	Singles
Silver medal – second place	2024 Kaunas	Singles
Silver medal – second place	2025 Tallinn	Singles
Representing Russia
Junior Grand Prix Final
Silver medal – second place	2016–17 Marseille	Singles

Anastasiia Vitalyevna Gubanova (Georgian: ანასტასია გუბანოვა, Russian: Анастасия Витальевна Губанова; born 2 December 2002), is a Russian-Georgian figure skater who represents Georgia in women's singles. She is the 2023 European champion, a two-time European silver medalist (2024, 2025), a three-time ISU Grand Prix medalist, and a four-time ISU Challenger Series gold medalist. She represented Georgia at the 2022 and 2026 Winter Olympics.

Competing for Russia, she is the 2018 CS Golden Spin of Zagreb silver medalist. On the junior level, she is the 2016 Junior Grand Prix Final silver medalist, the 2016 JGP Czech Republic champion, and the 2016 JGP Germany champion.

At the 2016 Junior Grand Prix Final, Gubanova became the first junior lady to break the 130-points barrier for the free program, a record beaten a few minutes later by teammate Alina Zagitova.

== Personal life ==
Gubanova was born on 2 December 2002, in Tolyatti, Samara Oblast, Russia. In addition to figure skating, Gubanova took part in both artistic and rhythmic gymnastics as a child. Until the age of fifteen, she also took ballet lessons at the Vaganova Academy of Russian Ballet. Gubanova obtained Georgian citizenship in 2021.

In November 2023, during the 2023 NHK Trophy, Gubanova's boyfriend, Roman Galay, proposed to her. The couple married on 26 July 2024.

In 2024, Gubanova opened up about her past struggles with disordered eating from the ages of fourteen to eighteen.

She cites Carolina Kostner and Kaori Sakamoto as her biggest skating inspirations.

== Career ==
=== Early years ===
Gubanova began skating in 2006 at the age of four after doctors advised her parents to enroll her in an outdoor sport to combat her allergies. A few months later, the family moved from Tolyatti to St. Petersburg in the hopes that Gubanova could join a stronger skating school. Angelina Turenko would become her coach at the age of six.

Gubanova began competing internationally in the advanced novice category in November 2013, taking gold at the Warsaw Cup. In the following years, she won the Rooster Cup, Gardena Spring Trophy, and NRW Trophy.

=== 2016–17 season: Junior Grand Prix Final silver ===
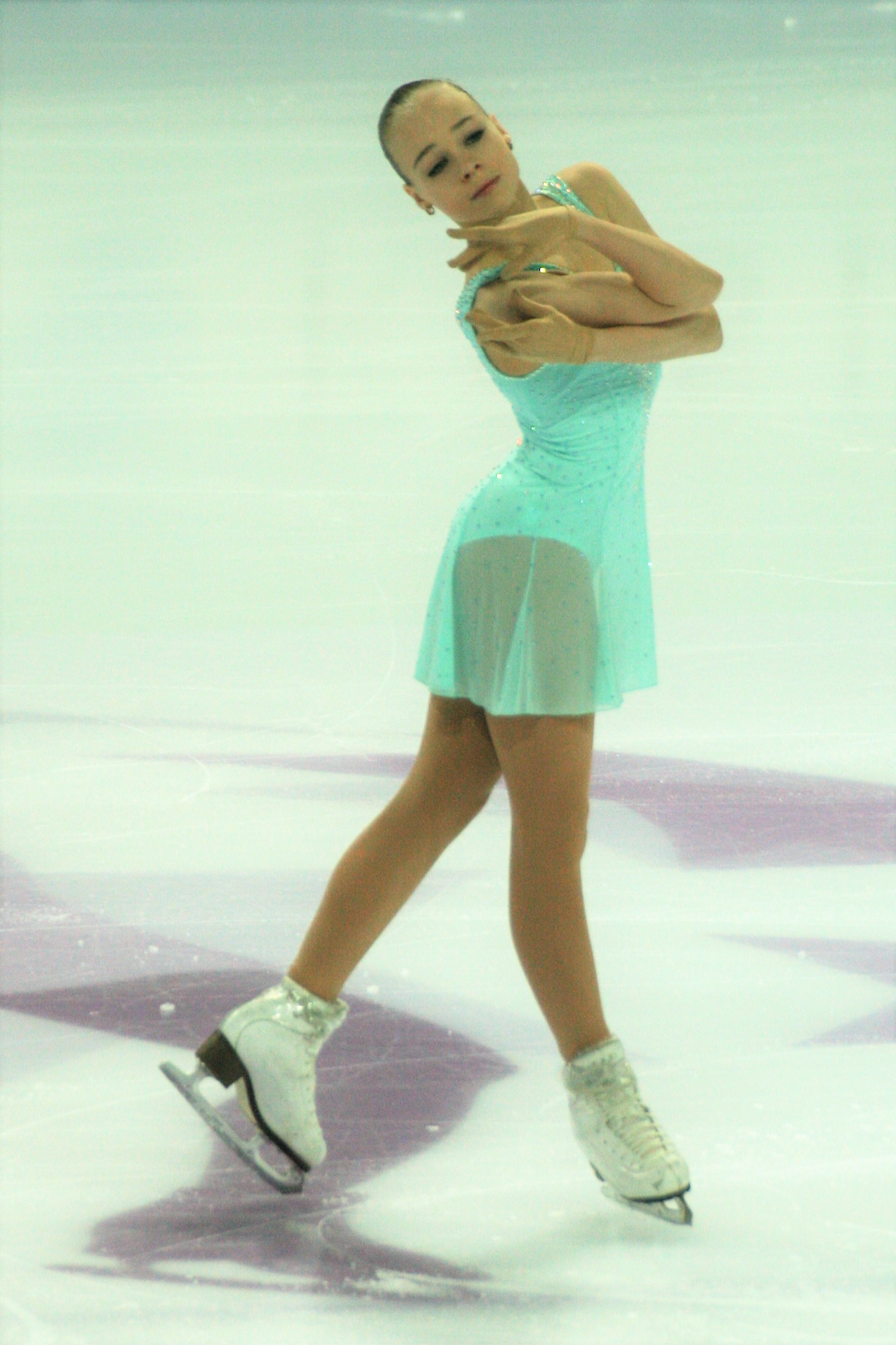
Gubanova during her short program at the 2016-17 Junior Grand Prix Final

Gubanova's junior international debut came at the 2016–17 ISU Junior Grand Prix (JGP) competition in Ostrava, Czech Republic; she won the gold medal by a margin of 0.08 over Japan's Rika Kihira, after placing second in the short program and first in the free skate. At the JGP in Dresden, Germany, she ranked first in both segments, setting a new world record for the free skate and outscoring the silver medalist, Yuna Shiraiwa, by 17.91 points. Gubanova qualified for the JGP Final in Marseille, France, where she won the silver medal scoring a new personal best in free skate of 133.77 and with a total of 194.07 points, just behind teammate Alina Zagitova who won the gold medal respectively.

At the 2017 Russian Championships, she placed seventh both on the senior level and at the junior event.

=== 2017–18 season ===
At the 2018 Russian Championships, Gubanova placed sixth on the senior level and fourth at the junior event. During the season she won two international junior events, 2017 Cup of Nice and 2017 Tallinn Trophy. In March, it was announced that Gubanova had moved to Moscow, where Elena Buianova became her new coach.

=== 2018–19 season: Senior international debut ===
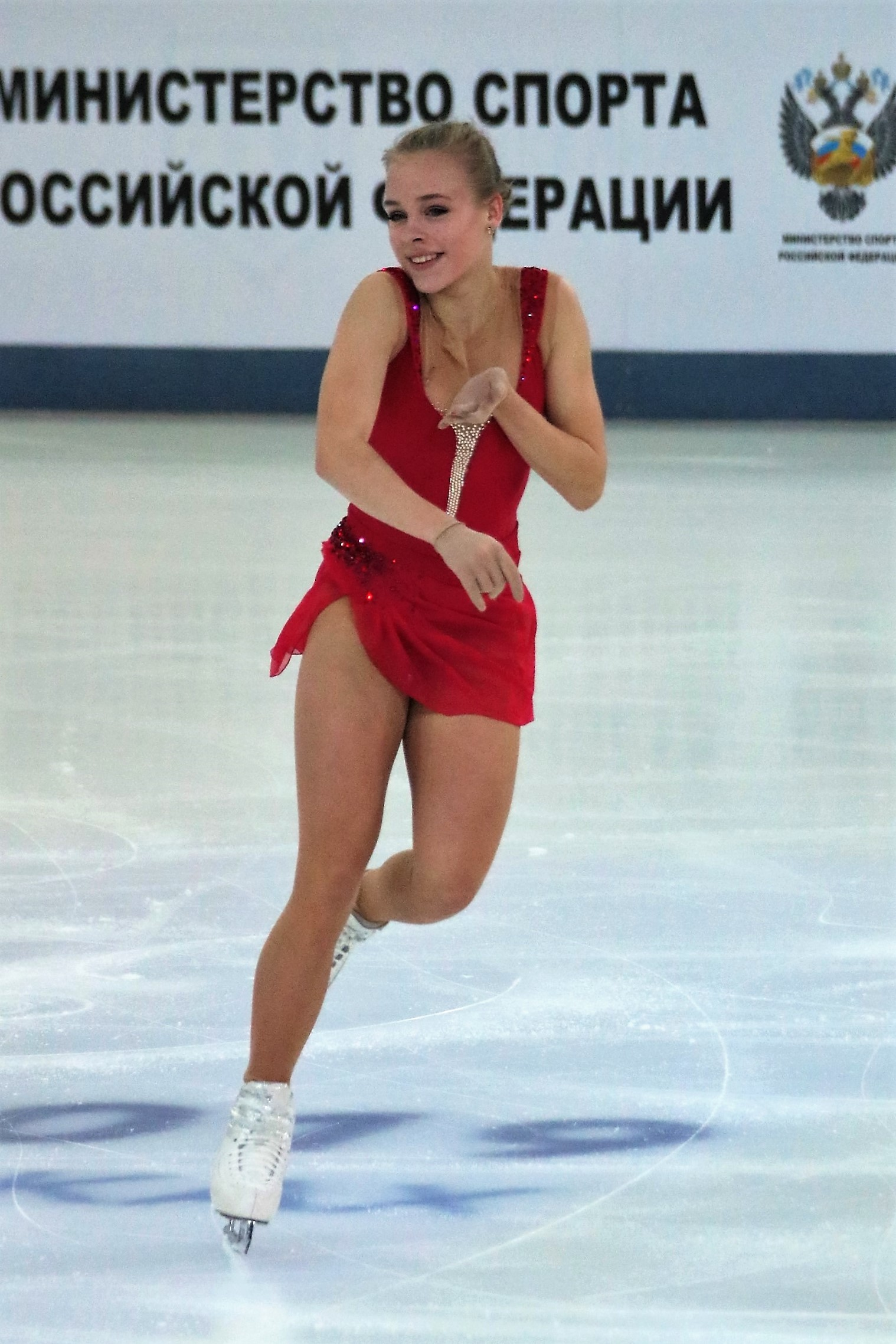
Gubanova at the 2019 Russian Championships

In late November, Gubanova made her senior international debut at the 2018 CS Tallinn Trophy where she finished fourth. One week later she competed at 2018 CS Golden Spin of Zagreb where she won her first international senior and Challenger Series medal (silver) with a personal best score of 198.65 points. She would finish ninth at the 2019 Russian Championships.

=== 2019–20 season and 2020–21 seasons ===
Prior to the 2019–20 season, Gubanova moved back to St. Petersburg and began training under Evgeni Rukavicin.

She competed at the 2020 Russian Championships, where she finished tenth.

During the 2020–21 season she competed only at the Saint Petersburg Championships, and in August 2021, it was announced that she would continue her career competing for Georgia.

=== 2021–22 season: Debut for Georgia and Beijing Olympics ===
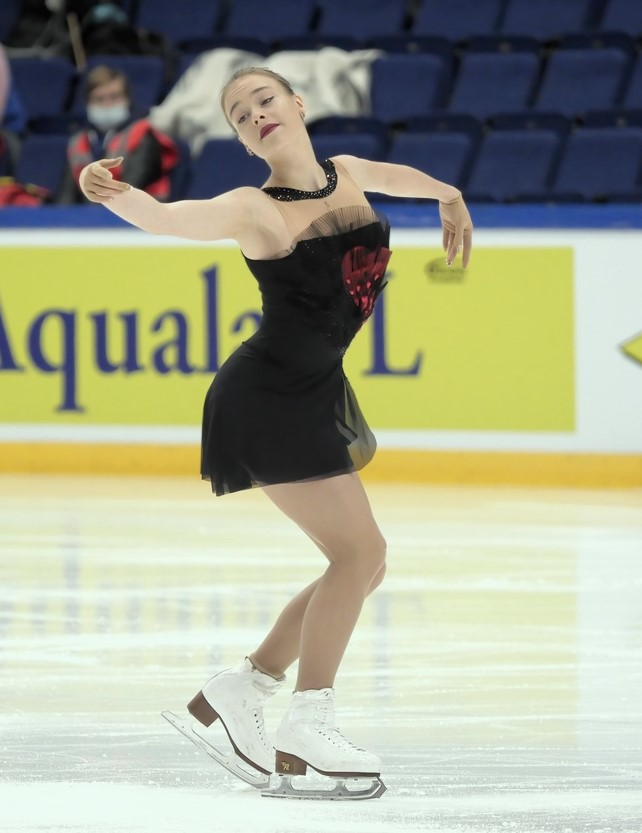
Gubanova performing her short program at the 2021 CS Finlandia Trophy

Gubanova opened the 2021–22 season at the 2021 CS Finlandia Trophy, her first international assignment since 2018. She placed fourth in the short program, scoring just shy of her personal best, but fell to seventh in the free skate and fifth overall, despite setting new personal bests for both the free program and total score. She was initially scheduled to compete next at the 2021 CS Cup of Austria in November, but withdrew from the event after contracting COVID-19.

After recovering from illness, Gubanova returned to competition in December at the 2021 CS Golden Spin of Zagreb where she earned her first international senior title. She won the short program despite a mistake on her final spin but fell to third in the free program. However, her lead from the short was enough to keep her narrowly in the lead, and she took the gold medal ahead of American skater Amber Glenn and Estonian Niina Petrõkina. She stated in an interview after the event with Russian media outlet Sports.ru, "I'm not in full shape after the illness, the COVID damaged my lungs and respiratory system...but of course, I'm very happy that I got the gold medal here, even if it's not quite ideal yet."

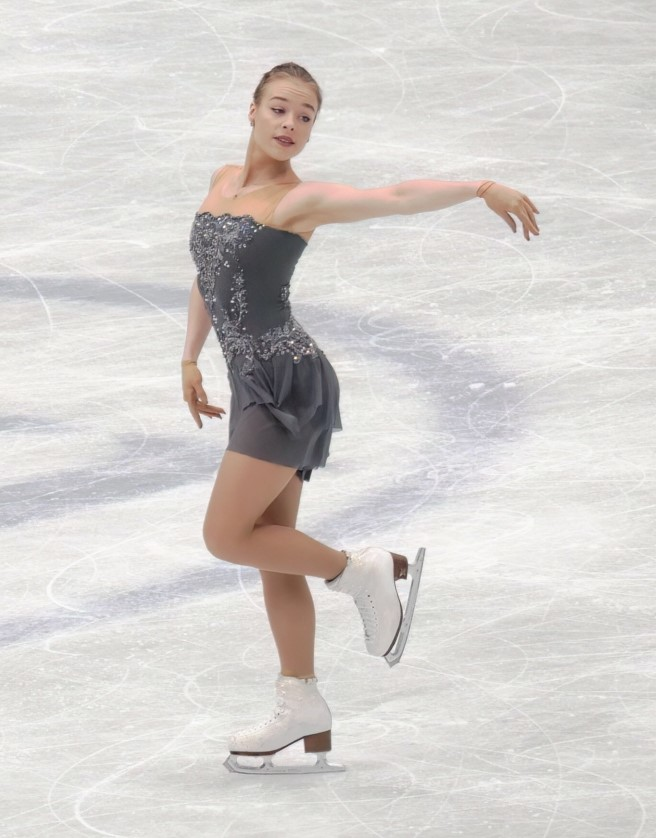
Gubanova performing her free program at the 2022 World Championships

Making her debut at the European Championships in Tallinn, Gubanova placed sixth in the short program with a clean skate. She struggled in the free skate, making several errors and dropping to seventh overall. Despite this, she said that the "impressions, however, are amazing after such a competition. It's a huge experience for me and for my future career."

Gubanova was officially named to the Georgian team for the 2022 Winter Olympics by the Georgian Figure Skating Federation on 19 January. She began the Olympics on 5 February as the women's entry for Georgia in the team event, where she skated a clean program to place fourth in the segment, and earn 7 points towards Team Georgia's combined score. However, despite scoring 22 team points overall to tie for fifth place with Team China going into the free skate, Team Georgia lost the tie-breaker and did not advance. In the women's event, Gubanova was tenth in the short program. She was tenth in the free skate as well and finished tenth overall.

At 2022 World Championships, the field was noticeably affected by the banning of all Russian skaters as a result of the Russo-Ukrainian War. In this more open contest, Gubanova placed sixth.

=== 2022–23 season: European champion and Grand Prix medal ===
Gubanova began the new season at the 2022 CS Finlandia Trophy, where she won the bronze medal, finishing 7.95 points behind South Korean silver medalist Kim Chae-yeon. She was then invited to make her senior Grand Prix debut at the 2022 MK John Wilson Trophy. She finished third in the short program and, while fifth in the free skate, remained third overall and won the bronze medal. She said she was "very pleased with my performance today and very happy to be here and glad I could do my job. I'm happy that my work has paid off!" Gubanova then finished seventh at the 2022 Grand Prix of Espoo.

Entering the 2023 European Championships as a podium contender, Gubanova unexpectedly placed first in the short program after pre-event favourite Loena Hendrickx of Belgium made a jump error. Hendrickx fell twice in the free skate, while Gubanova made only a minor jump error, finishing first in that segment as well and taking the gold medal. This was the first ISU championship title for a Georgian skater. She said that "at the end of my performance, there were a lot of emotions. Mostly I was happy that I was able to overcome myself. This medal means a lot to me."

Gubanova entered the 2023 World Championships in Saitama as a potential medal contender, but struggled at the event and finished fourteenth.

=== 2023–24 season: European silver ===
Gubanova won the gold medal at the 2023 CS Lombardia Trophy to start the season, before taking bronze at the 2023 CS Finlandia Trophy. On the Grand Prix, she placed second in the short program at the 2023 Grand Prix de France, but errors in the free skate dropped her to sixth place. She was sixth as well at the 2023 NHK Trophy, after coming tenth in the short program and rising to fourth in the free skate, which she considered an improvement after "disappointment" in France.

Seeking to defend her title at the 2024 European Championships, Gubanova finished third in the short program, behind Belgians Loena Hendrickx and Nina Pinzarrone. A strong free skate with five clean triple jumps lifted her above Pinzarrone to second place overall, reaching her second European podium. She claimed afterward that due to her difficulties in the first half of the season she "didn't expect a medal here at all," and was "really happy" with the result.

Gubanova ended the season at the 2024 World Championships, coming in thirteenth place.

=== 2024–25 season: Second consecutive European silver ===
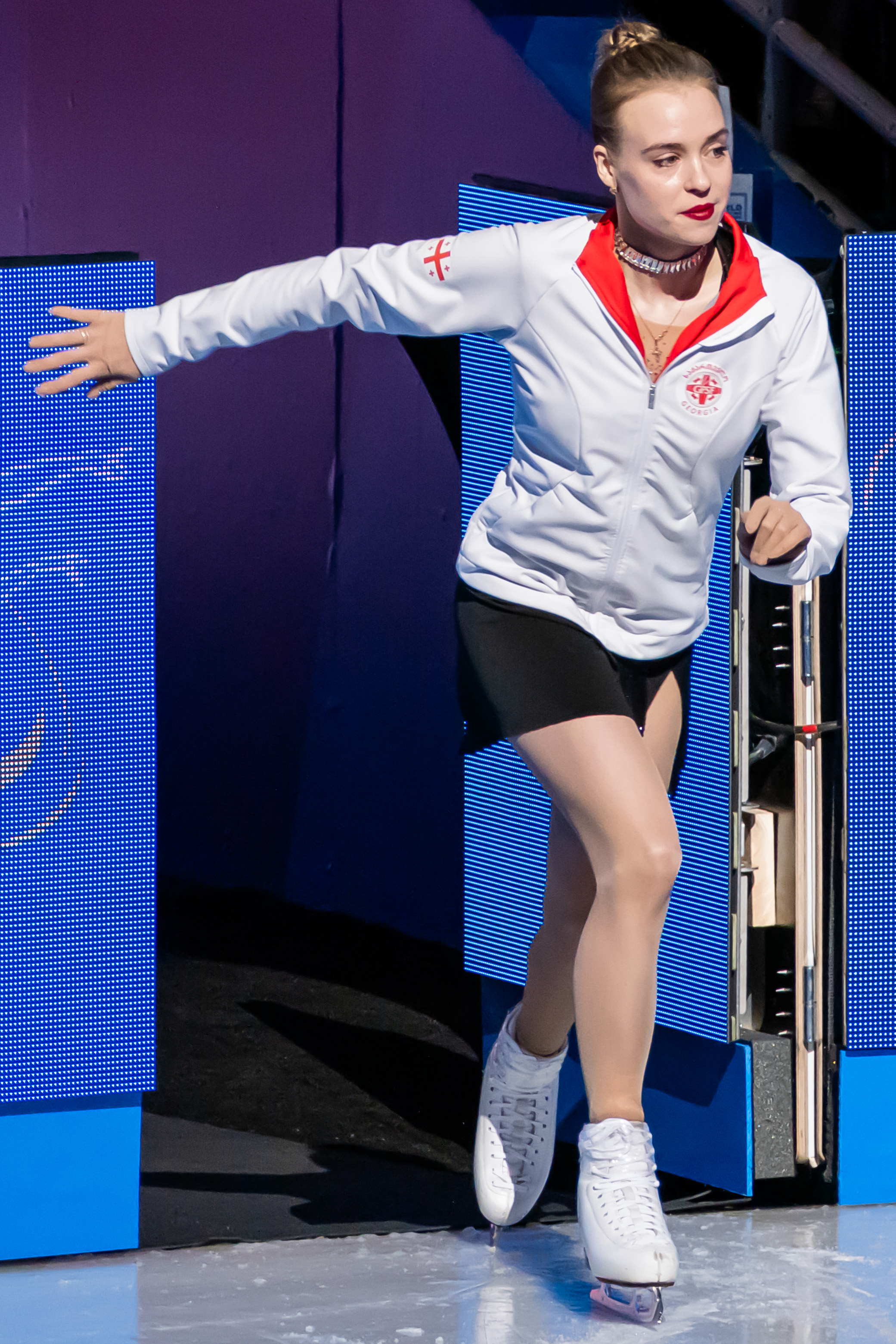
Gubanova at the 2025 World Championships

Gubanova started the season by competing on the 2024–25 ISU Challenger Series, finishing fourth at the 2024 CS Lombardia Trophy and winning gold at the 2024 CS Denis Ten Memorial Challenge. Going on to compete on the 2024–25 Grand Prix circuit, Gubanova finished eighth at the 2024 Grand Prix de France and at the 2024 Cup of China.

In January, Gubanova competed at the 2025 European Championships in Tallinn, Estonia, where she won the short program and placed second in the free skate, winning the silver medal overall behind home favorite, Niina Petrõkina. "I'm very happy with my short program," said Gubanova after the free skate. "Today, I made a small mistake, but overall, I'm really satisfied with this competition."

Two months later, during the 2025 World Championships in Boston, Massachusetts, United States, Gubanova failed to perform a jump combination and popped a planned double Axel into a single during the short program. As a result, she only placed twenty-eighth in that segment and did not advance to the free skate.

With Georgia qualifying a team to compete at the 2025 World Team Trophy, Gubanova was selected to compete in the women's singles event. She delivered two clean skates and scored new personal bests in the free skate and combined total segments to finish in fourth place overall. Team Georgia went on to finish sixth overall. "I'm so happy and today it was not really hard because I really have big support from my group," said Gubanova after the free skate.

=== 2025–26 season: Milano Cortina Olympics and Grand Prix medal ===
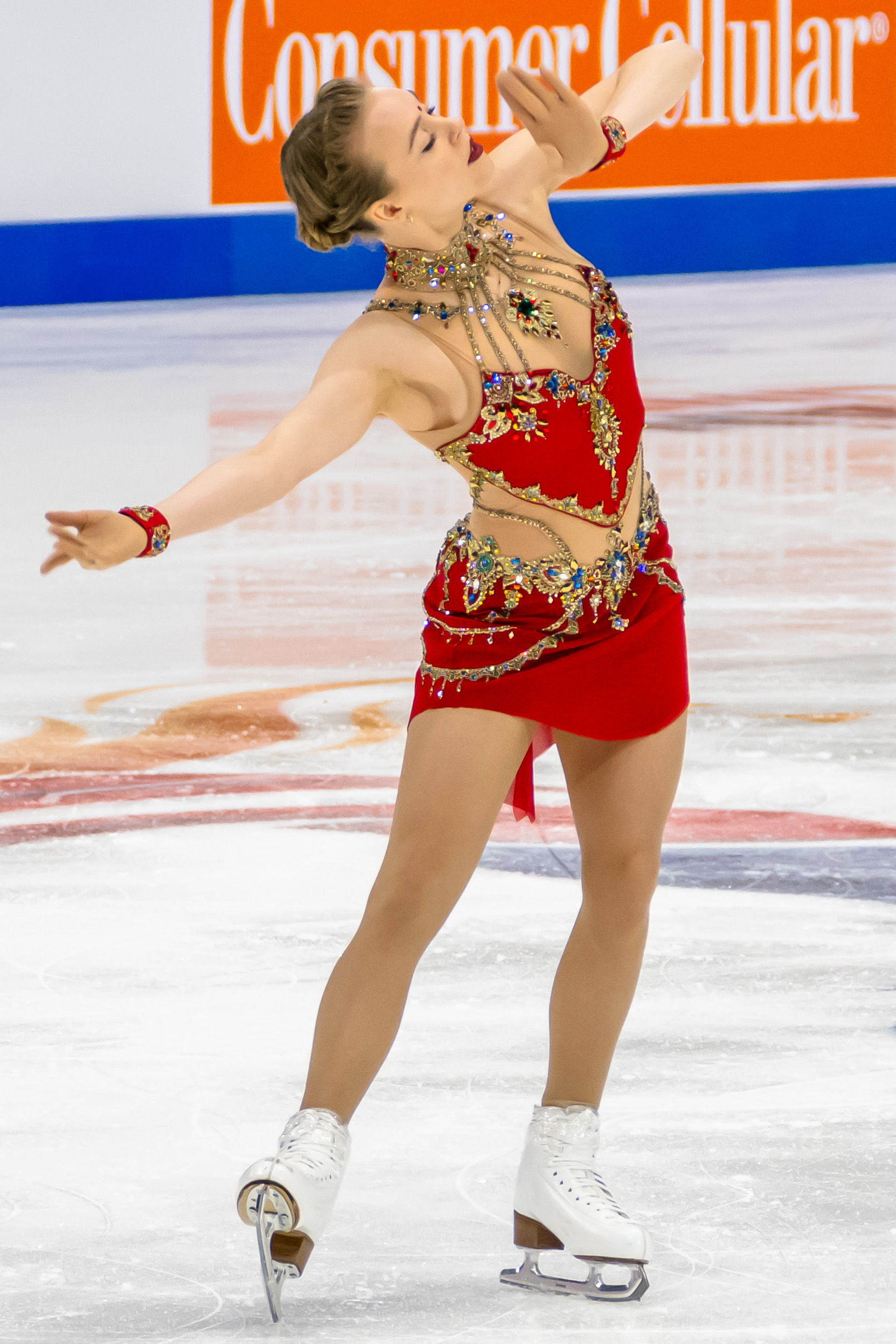
Gubanova performing her short program at 2025 Skate America

Gubanova opened her season by competing at the ISU Skate to Milano, the final qualifying competition for the 2026 Winter Olympics. At the event, she won the silver medal behind Adeliia Petrosian as well as earning a quota for Georgia in the women's singles discipline at the upcoming Winter Olympics. She subsequently competed at the 2025 CS Trialeti Trophy, winning the gold medal.

Going on to compete on the 2025–26 Grand Prix series, Gubanova finished fourth at the 2025 Cup of China. "Naturally, there were some nerves, as there always are, but it was all within an acceptable limit," said Gubanova after the free skate.

The following month, she competed at 2025 Skate America where she moved from fourth after the short program to third place overall to win the bronze. "This medal means a lot to me because all these past seasons, for some reason, I didn't skate so well at the Grand Prix," she said. "But finally everything here went well, so I'm really happy."

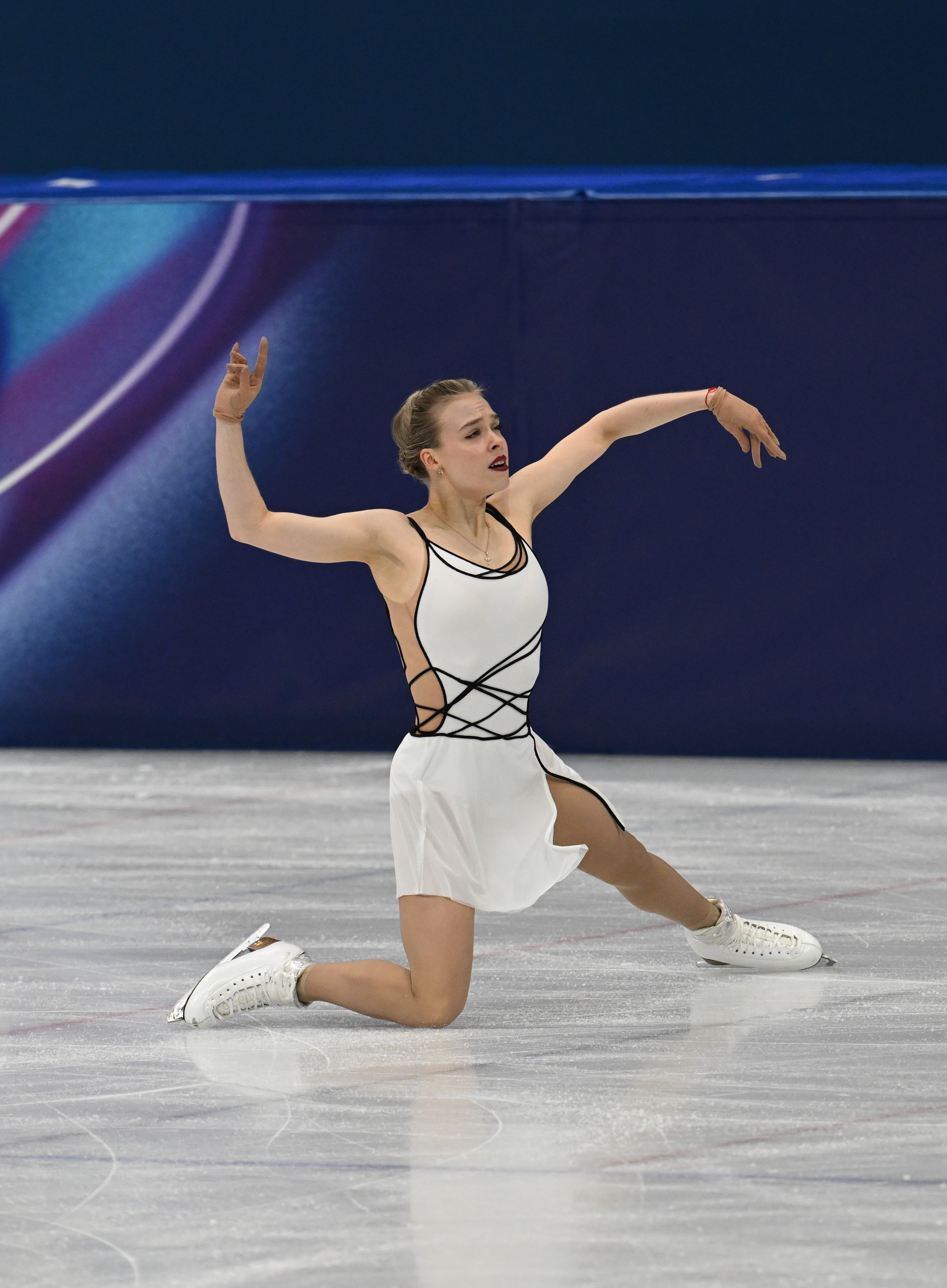
Gubanova performing her free skate at the 2026 Winter Olympics

In January, Gubanova competed at the 2026 European Championships where she placed fifth overall after an eleventh-place finish in the short program and a second place free skate. Speaking on the upcoming 2026 Winter Olympics during an interview at the event, she said, "I'm more excited about the team event. In my opinion, it's more important than the individual one. I want to push the maximum out of myself for the team event."

On 6 February, Gubanova competed in the short program of the 2026 Winter Olympics Figure Skating Team Event, finishing in fifth place. "I enjoyed my program," said Gubanova. "As for the jumps, it is a shame for the Lutz. I've worked on it a lot between Europeans and the Olympic Games, but I am glad it went better than at Europeans. It is a progress." Two days later, she competed in the free skate segment, where she finished second behind Kaori Sakamoto. Gubanova's placement, combined with those of her teammates, allowed Team Georgia to finish in fourth place overall.

On 17 February, Gubanova competed in the short program of the women's singles event. She placed sixth in the short program, earning a new personal best score in the process. "I'm incredibly happy about the skate," she said following her skate. "It was a terrific skate. This was more than I was hoping for." Two days later, she placed eleventh in the free skate segment and finished in ninth place overall. "I feel so much happiness and I'm very glad that I succeeded and showed two good performances," she said after her performance. "Both nights I was very focused on my programs. And at the end, when I finished, I was thinking about how I managed to do all of this and to perform so well. I'm really proud of myself."

One month later, Gubanova competed at the 2026 World Championships in Prague, finishing in tenth place overall after placing sixth in the short program and tenth in the free skate. She confirmed that she plans to compete in the upcoming season, "I am staying for another season. I will probably have a less full season - I will not go to all the competitions." She also added that Adam Solya would create her new programs for next season.

=== 2026–27 season ===
Gubanova opened the new season at the 2026 Trialeti Trophy, where she placed fourth overall. Gubanova went onto to compete on the 2026–27 Grand Prix series and placed second overall at the 2026 Grand Prix de France. “I was very nervous because I really wanted to show a better performance than at the Trialeti Trophy,” said Gubanova. “Today was really hard, but I’m happy I managed to do it and enjoy my skating.”

Two weeks later, Gubanova competed at 2026 Cup of China where she placed fourth overall. “I’m happy with my performance,” she said. “I did what I could, and I’m proud of myself, even though it’s a little pity not to have made the podium. But I think I did the best I could. I felt good about it, and I’m still very satisfied.”

== Records and achievements ==
=== Historical world record scores ===
Note: Because of the introduction of the new +5 / -5 GOE (Grade of Execution) system which replaced the previous +3 / -3 GOE system, ISU has decided that all statistics start from zero for the season 2018–19. All previous records are now historical.

Date	Score	Event	Note
8 October 2016	129.14	2016 JGP Germany	Gubanova broke Marin Honda's record from September 2016.
9 December 2016	133.77	2016–17 Junior Grand Prix Final	Gubanova upgraded her record from October 2016. At the same event, it was later broken by Alina Zagitova.

=== Other achievements ===
- The first Georgian skater to win the European Championships and also the first figure skater to win a senior-level ISU Championship for Georgia (2023).
- The first female Georgian skater to win an ISU Grand Prix medal (bronze at 2022 MK John Wilson Trophy).
- The best female athlete of the year in Georgia (2023)
- Order of Honor (2026)

== Programs ==
Competition and exhibition programs by season
Season	Short program	Free skate program	Exhibition program
2012–13	À Paris (Valzer): By Barimar	Limelight: Composed by Charlie Chaplin	—N/a
2013–14	Samson and Delilah: Composed by Camille Saint-Saëns	Limelight	—N/a
2014–15	Samson and Delilah	42nd Street Soundtrack: Composed by Harry Warren	—N/a
2015–16	"Snowstorm": Composed by Georgy Sviridov	Romeo & Juliet Soundtrack: Composed by Abel Korzeniowski	—N/a
2016–17	The Swan: Composed by Camille Saint-Saëns	Romeo & Juliet Soundtrack	—N/a
2017–18	Medley: 1. "Summertime"; Composed by George Gershwin: lyrics by DuBose Heyward and Ira Gershwin; Performed by Louis Armstrong & Ella Fitzgerald; 2. "Booty Swing"; Composed by Parov Stelar; Choreo. by Adam Solya	Hope: From Nocturnal Animals; Composed by Abel Korzeniowski; Choreo. by S. Korol, O. Ivanova; Tracks used: 1. "A Solitary Woman"; 2. "Table for Two"; 3. "Wayward Sisters"	—N/a
2018–19	"Take Five": Composed by Paul Desmond; Performed by Dave Brubeck; Choreo. by Peter Tchernyshev	Liebesträume: Composed by Franz Liszt; Choreo. by Tatiana Tarasova, Nikita Mikhailov	—N/a
2019–20	"I'll Take Care of You": Performed by Beth Hart and Joe Bonamassa; Choreo. by Olga Glinka and Valentin Molotov	"Couple in a Cafe": From Seventeen Moments of Spring; Composed by Mikael Tariverdiev; Choreo. by Olga Glinka and Valentin Molotov	—N/a
2020–21	"I'll Take Care of You"	"Couple in a Cafe"	—N/a
2021–22	Une vie d'amour: Performed by Charles Aznavour and Mireille Mathieu; Choreo. by Alena Leonova	W.E. Soundtrack: 1. "Letters"; 2. "Charms"; Composed by Abel Korzeniowski; Choreo. by Alena Leonova	"Dangerous Woman": By Ariana Grande
2022–23	Fabrizio Paterlini Medley: 1. "Istanbul Wedding"; 2. "Historiette No. 5"; Composed by Fabrizio Paterlini; Choreo. by Alena Leonova	Bollywood Medley: 1. "Latika's Theme"; 2. "Ringa Ringa"; From Slumdog Millionaire; Composed by A. R. Rahman; 3. Nagada Sang Dhol; From Goliyon Ki Raasleela Ram-Leela; Composed by Sanjay Leela Bhansali and Siddharth–Garima; Choreo. by Valentin Molotov	"Dangerous Woman"
2022–23	Fabrizio Paterlini Medley: 1. "Istanbul Wedding"; 2. "Historiette No. 5"; Composed by Fabrizio Paterlini; Choreo. by Alena Leonova	Bollywood Medley: 1. "Latika's Theme"; 2. "Ringa Ringa"; From Slumdog Millionaire; Composed by A. R. Rahman; 3. Nagada Sang Dhol; From Goliyon Ki Raasleela Ram-Leela; Composed by Sanjay Leela Bhansali and Siddharth–Garima; Choreo. by Valentin Molotov	"Barbie Girl": By Aqua
2023–24	"Mojo": By Claire Laffut; Choreo. by Vera Osipenko	"Caruso": Composed by Lucio Dalla; Performed by Lara Fabian; Choreo. by Olga Glinka & Valentin Molotov	"Barbie Girl"
2024–25	"Money, Money, Money": Composed by ABBA; Performed by Christian Reindl & Lloren; Choreo. by Adam Solya	Medley: 1. "Balder"; 2. "Freya"; Composed by Power-Haus, Christian Reindl, & Lucie Paradis; Choreo. by Adam Solya	Titanic: 1. Hymn to the Sea; 2. "My Heart Will Go On"; Composed by James Horner; Performed by Céline Dion
2024–25	"Money, Money, Money": Composed by ABBA; Performed by Christian Reindl & Lloren; Choreo. by Adam Solya	Medley: 1. "Balder"; 2. "Freya"; Composed by Power-Haus, Christian Reindl, & Lucie Paradis; Choreo. by Adam Solya	Medley: 1. "Oh, Pretty Woman"; Performed by Roy Orbison; 2. "Sweet Dreams (Are Made of This)"; Performed by Eurythmics; 3. "Vogue (remix)"; Performed by Madonna; 4. "Whenever, Wherever"; Performed by Shakira
2024–25	"Money, Money, Money": Composed by ABBA; Performed by Christian Reindl & Lloren; Choreo. by Adam Solya	Medley: 1. "Balder"; 2. "Freya"; Composed by Power-Haus, Christian Reindl, & Lucie Paradis; Choreo. by Adam Solya	"(You Make Me Feel Like) A Natural Woman": Composed by Carole King; Performed by Aretha Franklin
2025–26	Bollywood Medley: 1. "San Sanana"; From As̅oka; Composed by Anu Malik; Performed by Alka Yagnik & Hema Sardesai; 2. "Jogi"; Remixed by Panjabi MC; Choreo. by Adam Solya	"Unchained Melody/The Love Inside": From Ghost; Composed by Glen Ballard, Alex North, Bruce Joel Rubin, & Hy Zaret; Performed by Richard Fleeshman & Caissie Levy; Choreo. by Adam Solya	Puss in Boots: 1. "Porque te vas"; Performed by Gaby Moreno; 2. "The Puss Suite"; Composed by Henry Jackman; 3. "Americano""; Performed by Lady Gaga; Choreo. by Adam Solya
2026–27	"Oblivion": Composed by Astor Piazzolla	"Happiness Does Not Wait": 1. "Brotsjor"; Composed by Ólafur Arnalds; 2. "Dawn of Faith"; Performed by Eternal Eclipse; 3. "White Flowers Take Their Bath"; Performed by Mari Samuelsen and Meredi	Puss in Boots

== Competitive highlights ==
- GP – Event of the ISU Grand Prix Series
- JGP – Event of the ISU Junior Grand Prix Series
- CS – Event of the ISU Challenger Series
- TBD – Assigned
- WD – Withdrew from competition
- Medals at team events are awarded for the team results only. Individual placements at team events are listed in parentheses.

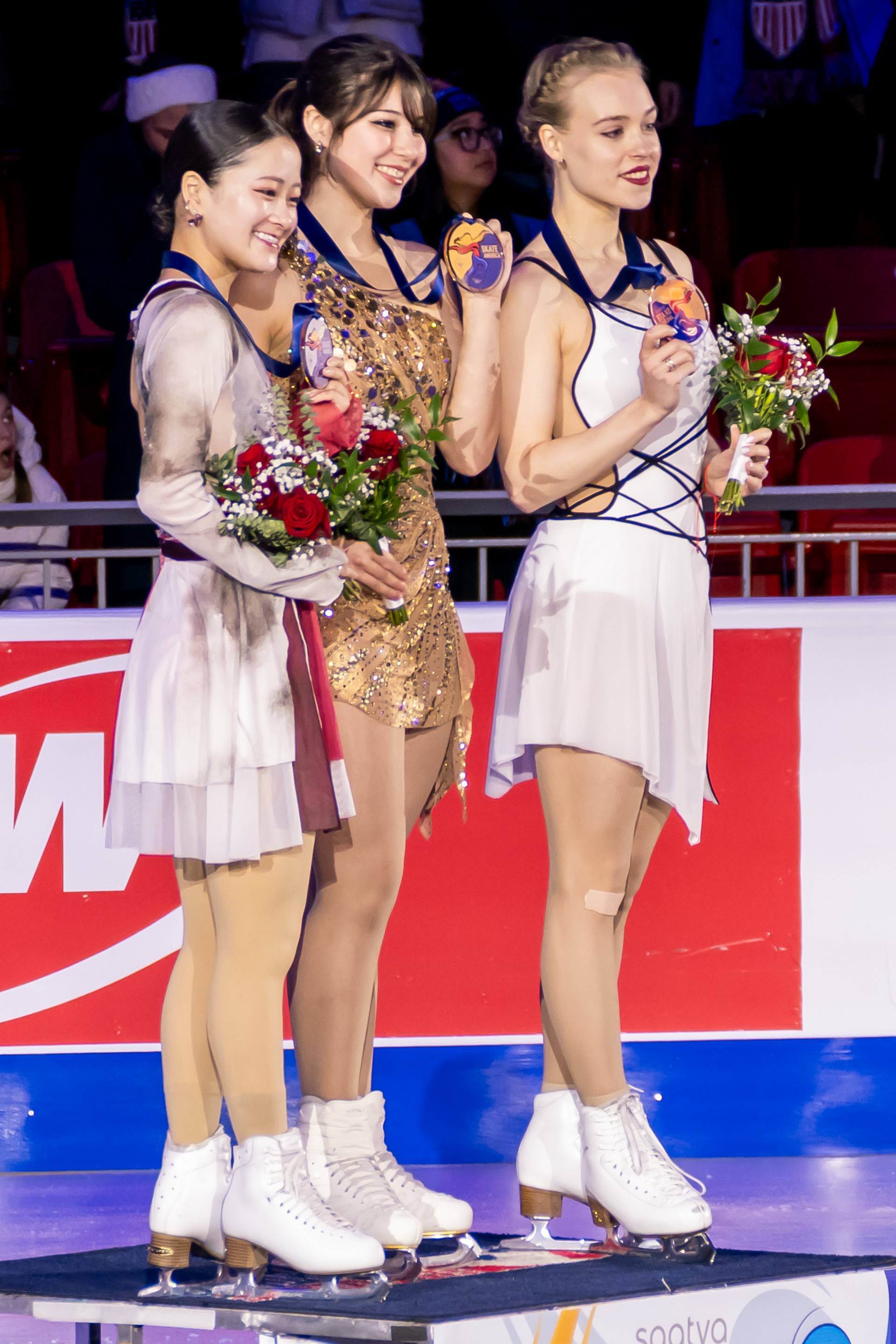
Gubanova at 2025 Skate America victory ceremony alongside: Alysa Liu (middle) and Rinka Watanabe (left)

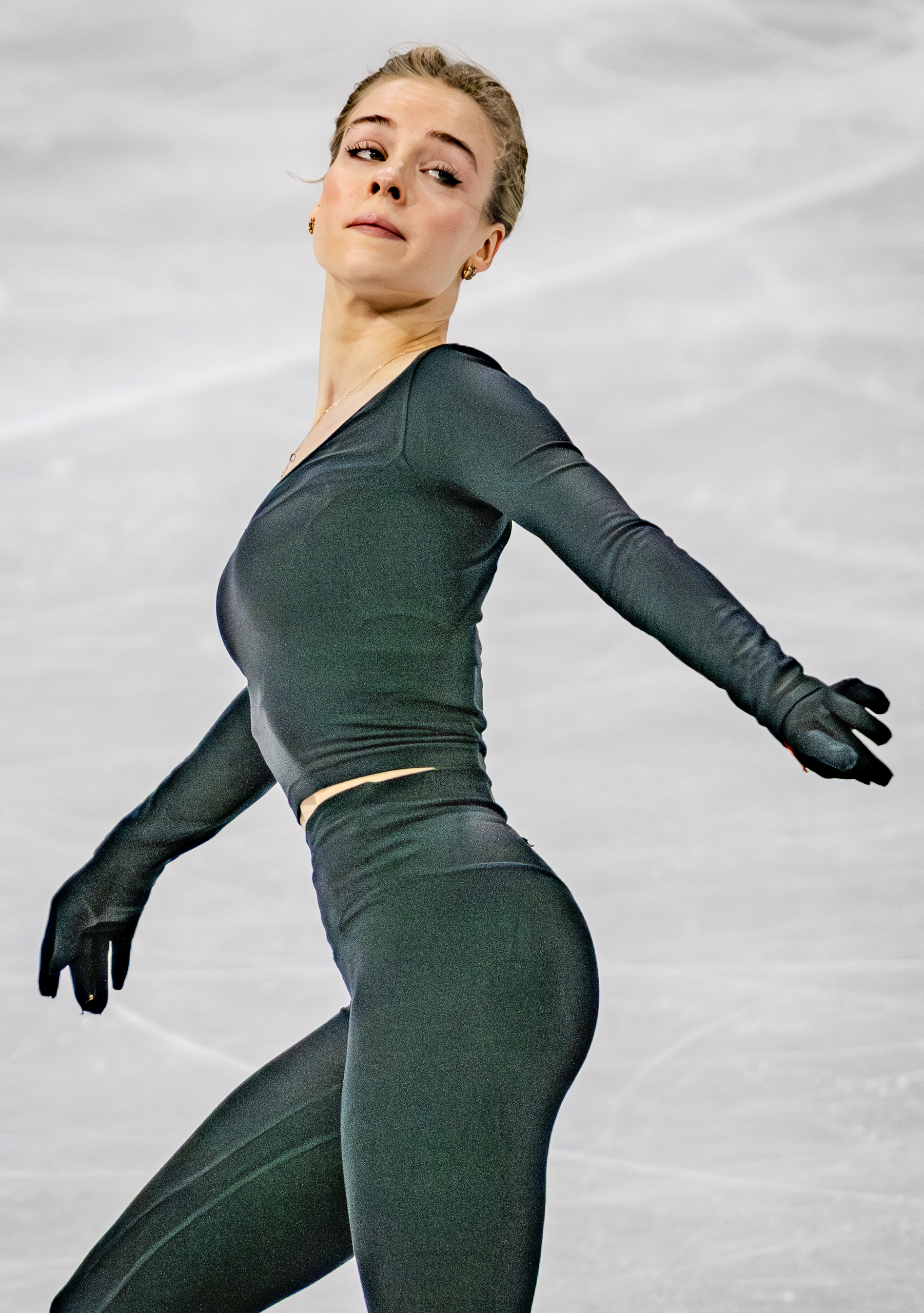
Anastasiia during a practice session at the 2026 Winter Olympics

=== Women's singles (for Georgia) ===
Competition placements at senior level
Season	2021–22	2022–23	2023–24	2024–25	2025–26	2026-27
Winter Olympics	10th				9th	
Winter Olympics (Team event)	6th				4th	
World Championships	6th	14th	13th	28th	10th	
European Championships	6th	1st	2nd	2nd	5th	
World Team Trophy				6th (4th)		
GP Cup of China				8th	4th	4th
GP Finland		7th				
GP France			6th	8th		2nd
GP NHK Trophy			6th			
GP Skate America					3rd	
GP Wilson Trophy		3rd				
CS Denis Ten Memorial				1st		
CS Finlandia Trophy	5th	3rd	3rd			
CS Golden Spin of Zagreb	1st					
CS Lombardia Trophy			1st	4th		
CS Trialeti Trophy					1st	4th
Skate to Milano					2nd	

=== Women's singles (for Russia) ===
Competition placements at senior level
Season	2016–17	2017–18	2018–19	2019–20
Russian Championships	7th	6th	9th	10th
CS Golden Spin of Zagreb			2nd	
CS Tallinn Trophy			4th	

Competition placements at junior level
Season	2013–14	2014–15	2015–16	2016–17	2017–18
Junior Grand Prix Final				2nd	
Russian Championships	7th	6th	12th	7th	4th
JGP Austria					4th
JGP Czech Republic				1st	
JGP Germany				1st	
Cup of Nice					1st
Egna Spring Trophy				1st	
Tallinn Trophy					1st
Volvo Open Cup				1st	

== Detailed results ==
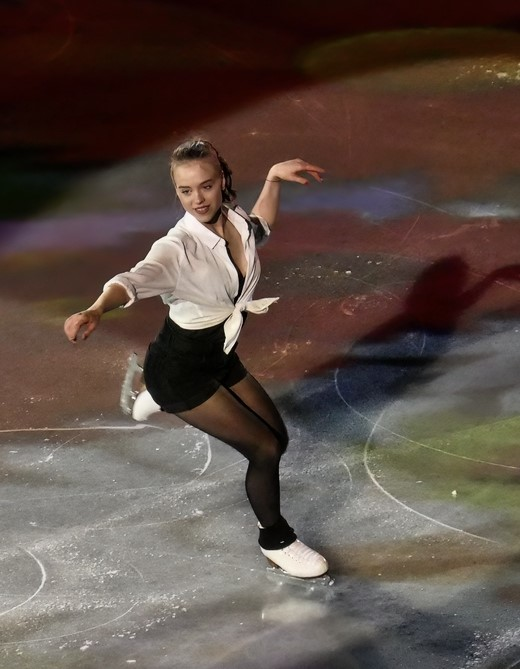
Gubanova performing her exhibition program at the 2022 World Championships

ISU personal best scores in the +5/-5 GOE System
Segment	Type	Score	Event
Total	TSS	211.19	2025 World Team Trophy
Short program	TSS	75.05	2026 Cup of China
Short program	TES	41.45	2026 Cup of China
Short program	PCS	33.60	2026 Cup of China
Free skating	TSS	141.39	2025 World Team Trophy
Free skating	TES	73.68	2025 World Team Trophy
Free skating	PCS	68.00	2025 Skate to Milano

ISU personal best scores in the +3/-3 GOE System
Segment	Type	Score	Event
Total	TSS	194.57	2016 JGP Germany
Short program	TSS	65.43	2016 JGP Germany
Short program	TES	37.58	2016 JGP Germany
Short program	PCS	29.40	2016−17 Junior Grand Prix Final
Free skating	TSS	133.77	2016−17 Junior Grand Prix Final
Free skating	TES	71.27	2016−17 Junior Grand Prix Final
Free skating	PCS	62.50	2016−17 Junior Grand Prix Final

=== Senior level ===
- Small medals for the short program and free skating are only awarded at ISU Championships.

==== Single skating (for Georgia) ====
Results in the 2021–22 season
Date	Event	SP		FS		Total	
Date	Event	P	Score	P	Score	P	Score
7–10 Oct 2021	(Finland) 2021 CS Finlandia Trophy	4	69.50	7	134.41	5	203.91
7–11 Dec 2021	(Croatia) 2021 CS Golden Spin of Zagreb	1	65.68	3	118.61	1	184.29
10–16 Jan 2022	(Estonia) 2022 European Championships	6	67.02	9	121.15	7	188.17
4–7 Feb 2022	(China) 2022 Winter Olympics (Team event)	4	67.56	—N/a	—N/a	6	—N/a
15–17 Feb 2022	(China) 2022 Winter Olympics	9	65.40	9	135.58	10	200.98
21–27 Mar 2022	(France) 2022 World Championships	14	62.59	5	134.02	6	196.61

Results in the 2022–23 season
Date	Event	SP		FS		Total	
Date	Event	P	Score	P	Score	P	Score
4–9 Oct 2022	(Finland) 2022 CS Finlandia Trophy	2	68.03	4	129.53	3	197.56
11–13 Nov 2022	(United Kingdom) 2022 MK John Wilson Trophy	3	66.82	5	126.29	3	193.11
25–27 Nov 2022	(Finland) 2022 Grand Prix of Espoo	9	56.03	8	110.54	7	166.57
25–29 Jan 2023	(Finland) 2023 European Championships	1	69.81	1	130.10	1	199.91
22–26 Mar	(Japan) 2023 World Championships	11	65.40	15	119.52	14	184.92

Results in the 2023–24 season
Date	Event	SP		FS		Total	
Date	Event	P	Score	P	Score	P	Score
8–10 Sep 2023	(Italy) 2023 CS Lombardia Trophy	1	69.65	4	115.95	1	185.60
4–8 Oct 2023	(Finland) 2023 CS Finlandia Trophy	4	60.62	2	118.99	3	179.61
3–5 Nov 2023	2023 Grand Prix de France	2	66.73	7	120.93	6	187.66
24–26 Nov 2023	(Japan) 2023 NHK Trophy	10	55.80	4	128.52	6	184.32
10–14 Jan 2024	(Lithuania) 2024 European Championships	3	68.96	2	137.59	2	206.52
18–24 Mar 2024	(Canada) 2024 World Championships	20	58.66	7	123.76	13	182.42

Results in the 2024–25 season
Date	Event	SP		FS		Total	
Date	Event	P	Score	P	Score	P	Score
13–15 Sep 2024	(Italy) 2024 CS Lombardia Trophy	4	66.78	3	128.96	4	195.74
3–5 Oct 2024	(Kazakhstan) 2024 CS Denis Ten Memorial Challenge	1	69.07	2	126.84	1	195.91
1–3 Nov 2024	2024 Grand Prix de France	9	56.77	7	116.44	8	173.21
22–24 Nov 2024	2024 Cup of China	11	52.11	7	125.23	8	177.34
28 Jan – 2 Feb 2025	(Estonia) 2025 European Championships	1	68.99	2	129.62	2	198.61
26–30 Mar 2025	(United States) 2025 World Championships	28	47.31	—N/a	—N/a	28	47.31
17–20 Apr 2025	(Japan) 2025 World Team Trophy	3	69.80	4	141.39	6 (4)	211.19

Results in the 2025–26 season
Date	Event	SP		FS		Total	
Date	Event	P	Score	P	Score	P	Score
18–21 Sep 2025	(China) Skate to Milano	2	68.08	2	138.15	2	206.23
8–11 Oct 2025	(Georgia (country)) 2025 CS Trialeti Trophy	1	65.76	1	137.93	1	203.69
24–26 Oct 2025	2025 Cup of China	5	66.28	3	131.60	4	197.88
14–16 Nov 2025	(United States) 2025 Skate America	4	68.07	2	136.62	3	204.69
13–18 Jan 2026	(United Kingdom) 2026 European Championships	11	56.17	2	128.19	5	184.36
6–8 Feb 2026	(Italy) 2026 Winter Olympics – Team event	5	67.79	2	140.17	4	—N/a
17–19 Feb 2026	(Italy) 2026 Winter Olympics	6	71.77	11	138.22	9	209.99
24–29 Mar 2026	(Czech Republic) 2026 World Championships	6	69.92	10	128.89	10	198.81

Results in the 2026–27 season
Date	Event	SP		FS		Total	
Date	Event	P	Score	P	Score	P	Score
1–4 Oct 2026	(Georgia (country)) 2026 CS Trialeti Trophy	3	70.69	5	118.62	4	189.31
23-25 Oct 2026	2026 Grand Prix de France	2	72.63	3	130.19	2	202.82
Nov 6–8, 2026	2026 Cup of China	2	75.05	4	133.53	4	208.58

==== Single skating (for Russia) ====
2019–20 season
Date	Event	SP	FS	Total
24–29 December 2019	2020 Russian Championships	12; 60.87	8; 129.19	10; 190.06
2018–19 season
Date	Event	SP	FS	Total
19–23 December 2018	2019 Russian Championships	8; 70.54	11; 133.22	9; 203.76
5–8 December 2018	2018 CS Golden Spin of Zagreb	2; 69.56	2; 129.09	2; 198.65
26 Nov – 2 December 2018	2018 CS Tallinn Trophy	4; 60.29	4; 120.44	4; 180.73

=== Junior level ===
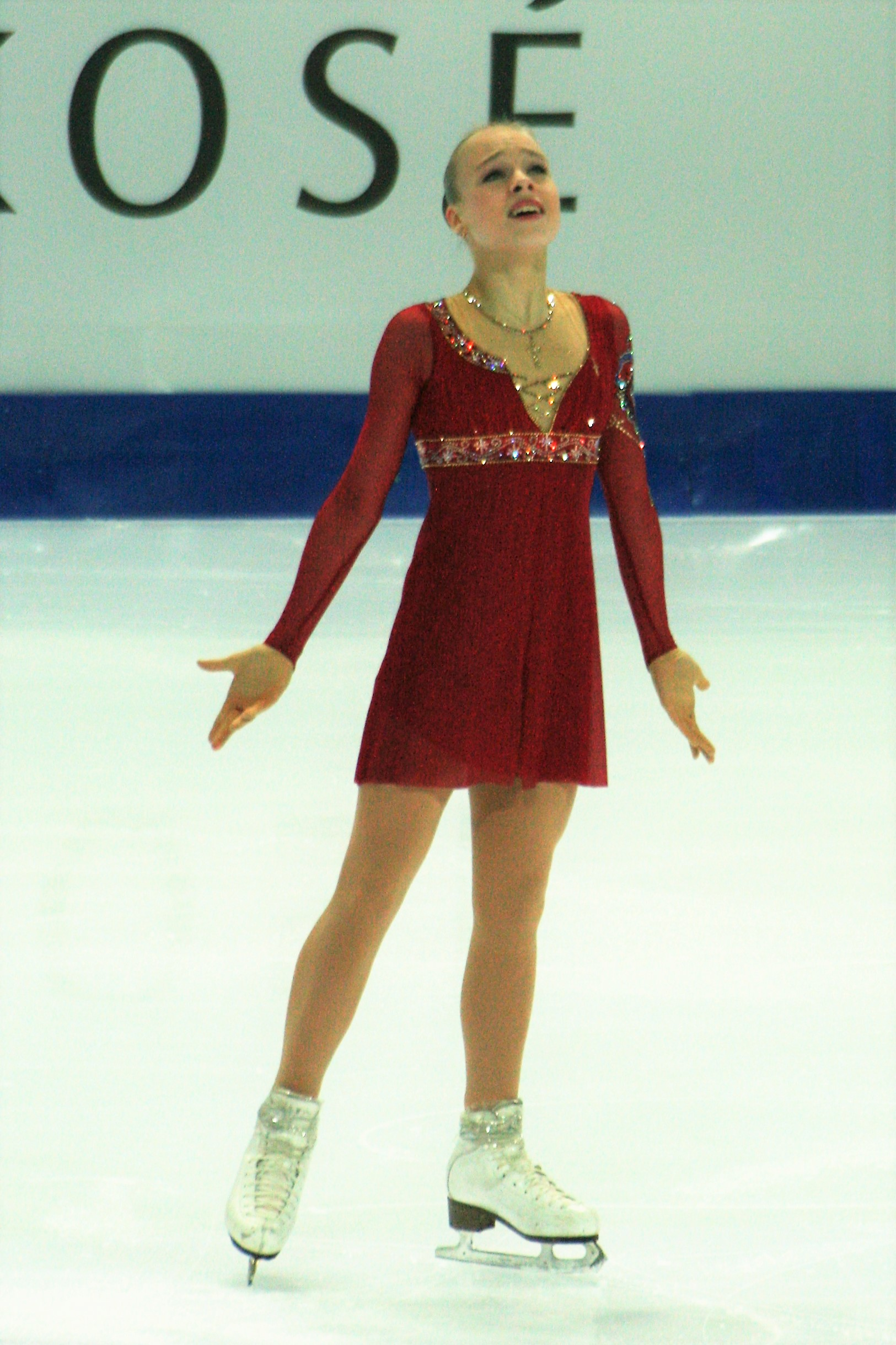
Gubanova during her free skate at the 2016−17 Junior Grand Prix Final

2017–18 season
Date	Event	Level	SP	FS	Total
23–26 January 2018	2018 Russian Junior Championships	Junior	2; 72.10	4; 133.82	4; 205.92
21–24 December 2017	2018 Russian Championships	Senior	5; 71.69	5; 134.91	6; 206.60
21–26 November 2017	2017 Tallinn Trophy	Junior	1; 64.63	1; 124.68	1; 189.31
11–15 October 2017	2017 Cup of Nice	Junior	1; 63.28	1; 125.02	1; 188.30
31 Aug – 2 September 2017	2017 JGP Austria	Junior	6; 53.99	4; 106.76	4; 160.75
2016–17 season
Date	Event	Level	SP	FS	Total
6–9 April 2017	2017 Egna Spring Trophy	Junior	1; 57.75	1; 117.24	1; 174.99
1–5 February 2017	2017 Russian Junior Championships	Junior	11; 62.18	6; 123.61	7; 185.79
20–26 December 2016	2017 Russian Championships	Senior	10; 63.34	6; 133.92	7; 197.26
8–11 December 2016	2016−17 JGP Final	Junior	3; 60.30	2; 133.77	2; 194.07
9–13 November 2016	2016 Volvo Open Cup	Junior	1; 65.96	1; 125.22	1; 191.18
6–8 October 2016	2016 JGP Germany	Junior	1; 65.43	1; 129.14	1; 194.57
1–4 September 2016	2016 JGP Czech Republic	Junior	2; 63.51	1; 122.08	1; 185.59
2015–16 season
Date	Event	Level	SP	FS	Total
21–23 January 2016	2016 Russian Junior Championships	Junior	9; 60.26	16; 96.47	12; 156.73
2014–15 season
Date	Event	Level	SP	FS	Total
4–7 February 2015	2015 Russian Junior Championships	Junior	7; 60.77	5; 117.67	6; 178.44
2013–14 season
Date	Event	Level	SP	FS	Total
22–25 January 2014	2014 Russian Junior Championships	Junior	9; 58.75	7; 114.96	7; 173.71
