= Evgeni Rukavicin =

Russian figure skating coach (born 1977)

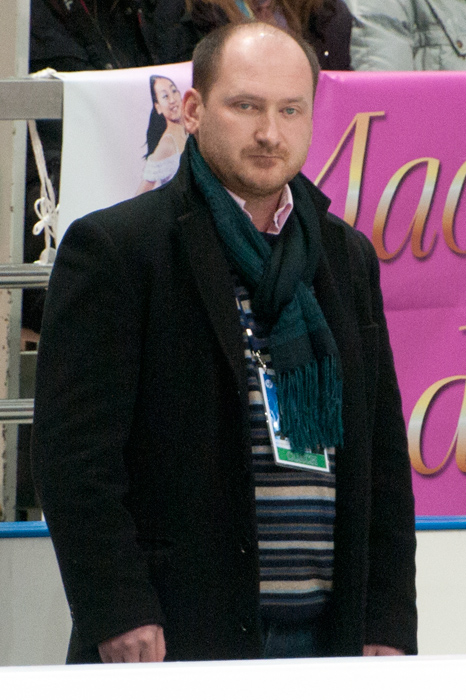
- Evgeni Rukavicin at the 2011 Rostelecom Cup

Personal information
- Native name: Евгений Владимирович Рукавицын
- Full name: Evgeni Vladimirovich Rukavicin
- Born: 26 February 1977 (age 49) Saint Petersburg, Russian SFSR, Soviet Union

Evgeni Vladimirovich Rukavicin (Russian: Евгений Владимирович Рукавицын; born 26 February 1977) is a Russian figure skating coach. He coaches ladies' and men's singles.

== Career ==
Evgeni Rukavicin competed at 1995 Russian Figure Skating Championships where he placed 10th. He became a coach after his retirement from competitive figure skating when he was 19.

His first remarkable pupil was (Russia) Konstantin Menshov. Rukavicin coached Menshov to the 2011 Russian National title and 2014 European bronze medal.

His current students include

- (Russia) Dmitri Aliev, 2020 European champion, 2018 European silver medalist, 2017 World Junior silver medallist, 2016-17 Junior Grand Prix Final champion and 2015-16 Junior Grand Prix Final silver medalist;
- (Russia) Artur Danielian - since 2022;
- (Russia) Anna Frolova - since 2023;
- (Georgia (country)) Anastasiia Gubanova, 2023 European champion, 2024 European silver medalist, 2025 European silver medalist - began coaching her in 2019;
- (Germany) Nikita Starostin;
- (Russia) Matvei Vetlugin - since 2024;

His former students included also

- (Russia) Polina Agafonova - from 2013 to 2014;
- (Russia) Maria Artemieva;
- (Latvia) Glebs Basins;
- (Russia) Alisa Fedichkina - until 2019;
- (Latvia) Alīna Fjodorova;
- (Finland) Roman Galay;
- (Russia) Gordei Gorshkov;
- (Russia) Makar Ignatov - until 2024;
- (Lithuania) Elžbieta Kropa;
- (Russia) Alena Leonova - began coaching her in 2014;
- (Russia) Ksenia Makarova - since 2011;
- (Russia) Elizaveta Nugumanova - from 2019 to 2022;
- (Finland) Oona Ounasvuori - until 2023;
- (Russia) Diana Pervushkina;
- (Czech Republic) Georgii Reshtenko;
- (Poland) Ihor (Igor) Reznichenko - until 2018;
- (Russia) Serafima Sakhanovich - from 2015 to 2018;
- (Russia) Vladislav Sesganov;
- (Russia) Anton Shulepov - until 2019;
- (Russia) Maria Talalaikina.

Moreover, Rukavicin worked with (Finland) Viveca Lindfors, 2019 European bronze medalist, and (Italy) Matteo Rizzo, who also used to go to Saint Petersburg to work with Rukavicin and his group before winning bronze medal at the 2019 Europeans.

A lot of his students are known for their jumping achievements. Konstantin Menshov became one of the first skaters to have landed two quad jumps in a short program and three quads in a free skate (at the age of 31). Vladislav Sesganov practiced quad lutz and quad lutz - triple toe loop combination since 2011. He landed quad lutz in a sanctioned international competition in 2013. Some skaters from his training group practiced and attempted difficult jumps in competitions, such as Anton Shulepov, Konstantin Menshov, Dmitri Aliev, Gordei Gorshkov.

As a result, Dmitri Aliev became the first European skater to have completed at least three different quad jumps in international competitions: toe loop, Lutz and Salchow. Makar Ignatov is the first Russian and also European skater to have landed four quads in the free skate and also six quads in two programs. He landed 4Lo and 4T-3T in his short program as well as 4Lo, 4S, 4T-3T and 4T in the free skate at the 2021 NHK Trophy.
