= Dmitri Aliev =

Russian figure skater (born 1999)

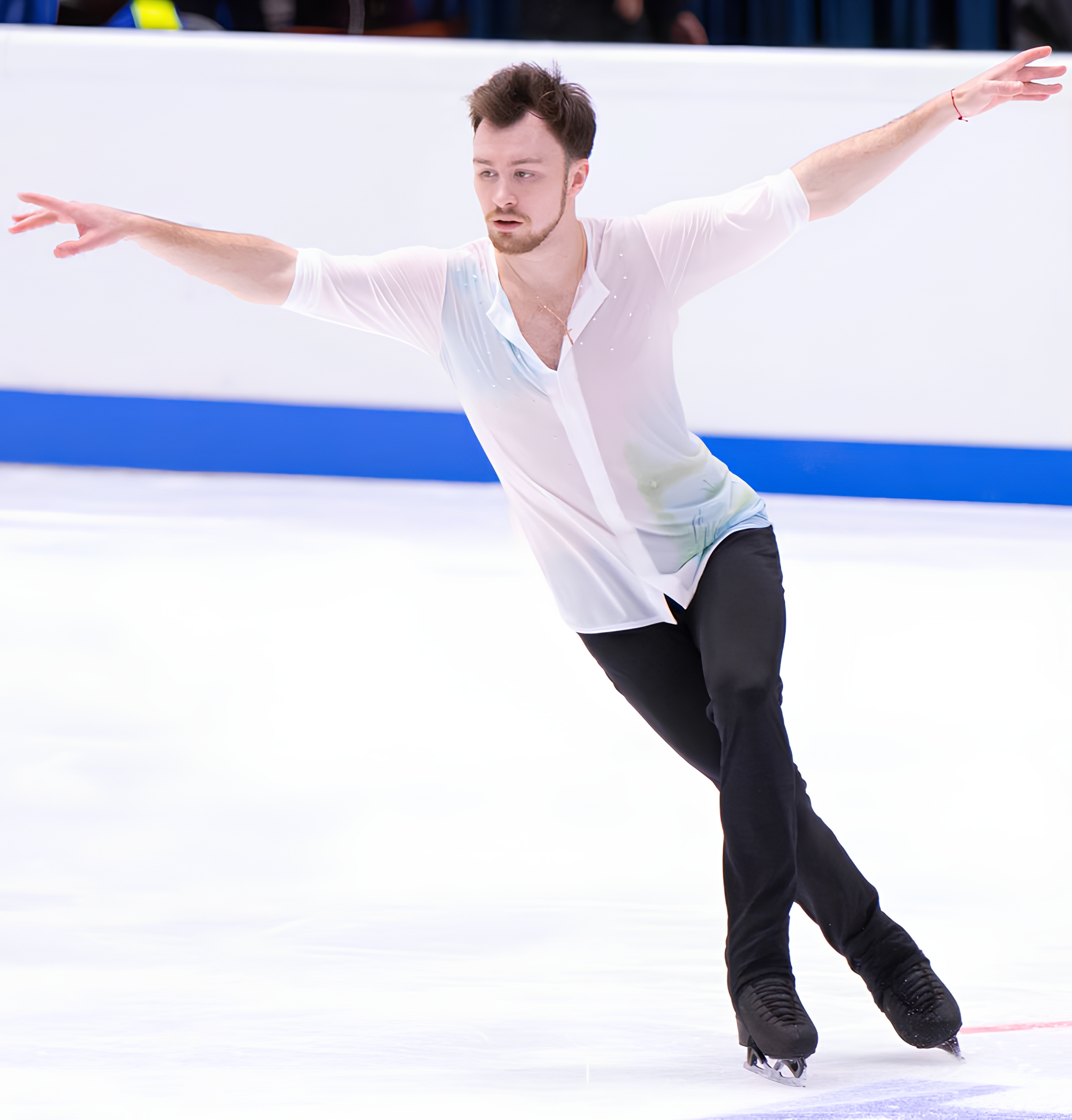
- Aliev at the 2024 Channel One Trophy

Personal information
- Native name: Дмитрий Сергеевич Алиев
- Full name: Dmitri Sergeyevich Aliev
- Born: 1 June 1999 (age 27) Ukhta, Russia
- Home town: Saint Petersburg, Russia
- Height: 1.74 m (5 ft 9 in)

Figure skating career
- Country: Russia
- Discipline: Men's singles
- Coach: Evgeni Rukavicin
- Skating club: Olympic School St. Petersburg
- Began skating: 2005
- Highest WS: 11th (2017–18)

Medal record
European Championships
Gold medal – first place	2020 Graz	Singles
Silver medal – second place	2018 Moscow	Singles
Russian Championships
Gold medal – first place	2020 Krasnoyarsk	Singles
Bronze medal – third place	2018 Saint Petersburg	Singles
Winter Youth Olympics
Gold medal – first place	2016 Lillehammer	Team
Bronze medal – third place	2016 Lillehammer	Singles
World Junior Championships
Silver medal – second place	2017 Taipei	Singles
Junior Grand Prix Final
Gold medal – first place	2016–17 Marseille	Singles
Silver medal – second place	2015–16 Barcelona	Singles

Dmitri Sergeyevich Aliev (Russian: Дмитрий Сергеевич Алиев; born 1 June 1999) is a Russian figure skater. He is the 2020 European champion, the 2018 European silver medalist, the 2020 Russian national champion and the 2018 Russian national bronze medalist. On the junior level, he is the 2017 World Junior silver medalist, the 2016–17 Junior Grand Prix Final champion, the 2015-16 Junior Grand Prix Final silver medalist, a two-time medalist at the 2016 Youth Olympics (bronze in the men's singles discipline and gold in the team event), and a two-time (2016, 2017) Russian national junior champion. He began skating in 2005 and trained in Ukhta until 2013, when he moved to Saint Petersburg to become a student of Evgeni Rukavicin.

== Personal life ==
Dmitri Sergeyevich Aliev was born on 1 June 1999 in Ukhta, Komi Republic, Russia. On his paternal side, Dmitry has Azerbaijani roots. His father, Sergey Vasilevich, is the director of a children's and youth sports school №1 in Ukhta. His mother, Elena, is a skier. In September 2022, Aliev received a summons to appear at the military commissariat for a potential call-up to serve in the Russian Army during the 2022 Russian mobilization.

Since 2025, he has been dating Russian rhythmic gymnast Arina Averina.

== Career ==
Having begun skating in 2005, Aliev trained in Ukhta until 2013 when he moved to Saint Petersburg, becoming a student of Evgeni Rukavicin.

=== 2014–15 season ===
Aliev debuted on the ISU Junior Grand Prix (JGP) series in the 2014–15 season. Awarded bronze medals in Ljubljana, Slovenia and Aichi, Japan, he finished as the third alternate for a place at the JGP Final. Making his senior international debut, he placed tenth at the 2014 Golden Spin of Zagreb, an ISU Challenger Series event. Returning to the junior ranks, he won bronze medals at the 2015 Russian Junior Championships and 2015 European Youth Olympic Winter Festival.

=== 2015–16 season ===
In 2015–16, Aliev's first assignment was a Junior Grand Prix event in Riga, Latvia. Placing sixth in the short program and first in the free skate, he won the gold medal by a margin of 5.32 points ahead of Latvia's Deniss Vasiļjevs. He then took gold in Linz, Austria, with a total score 14 points higher than silver

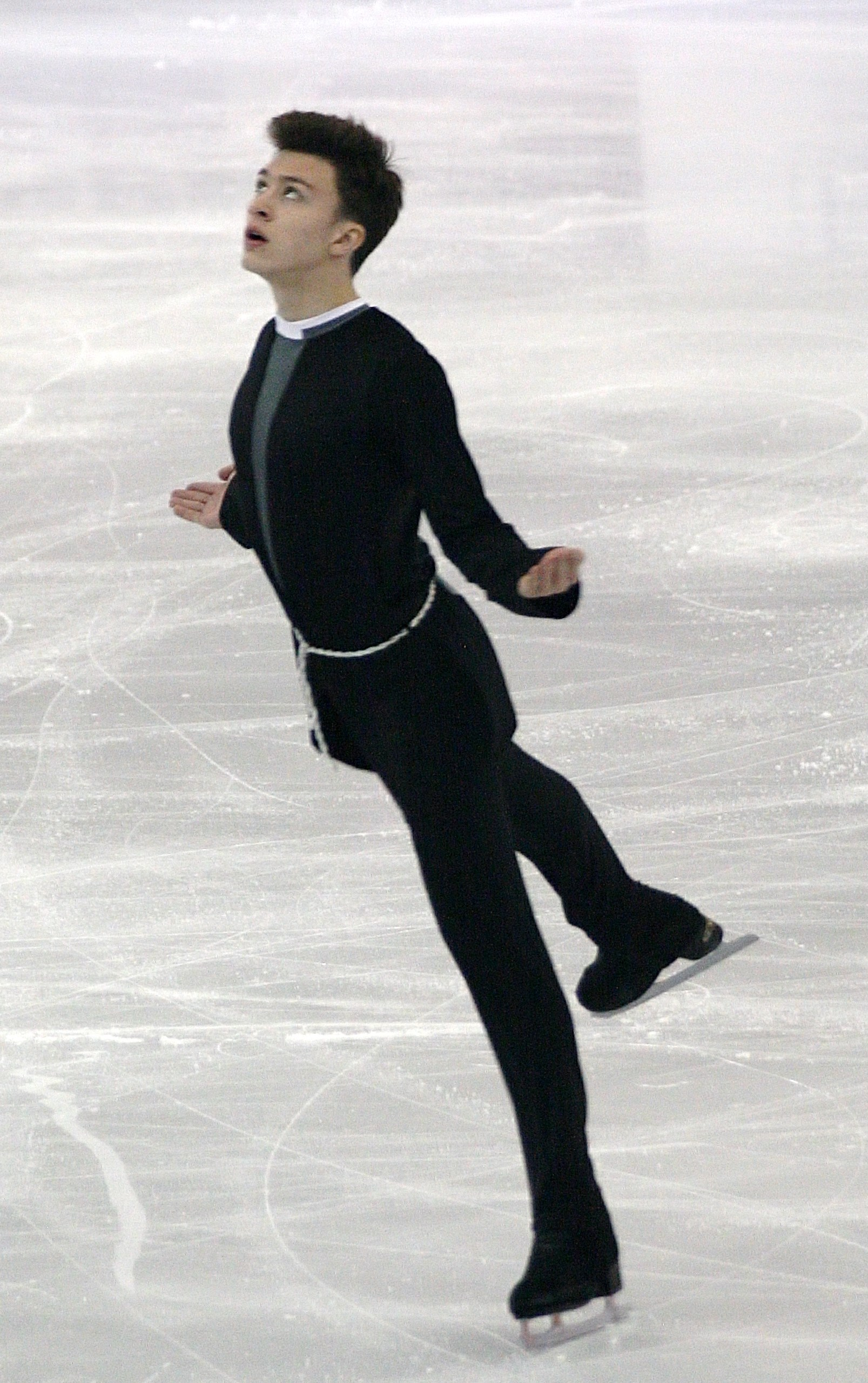
Aliev at the 2015–16 Grand Prix of Figure Skating Final

medalist Vincent Zhou, and qualified for the Junior Grand Prix Final.

Competing on the senior level, Aliev was awarded bronze at the 2015 International Cup of Nice and silver at the 2015 CS Tallinn Trophy. In December, he won the silver medal at the 2015–16 JGP Final in Barcelona, having finished second to Nathan Chen of the United States. Later that month, he placed sixth at the 2016 Russian Championships in Yekaterinburg before winning his first junior national title in January in Chelyabinsk.

Aliev won the bronze medal in the men's singles discipline and the gold medal in the team event at the 2016 Youth Olympics in Hamar, Norway. He was awarded a small gold medal for his short program result at the 2016 World Junior Championships in Debrecen, Hungary. Ranked seventh in the free skate, he finished 6th overall.

=== 2016–17 season ===
Starting his season on the Junior Grand Prix series, Aliev won gold in Ostrava, Czech Republic, after placing first in both segments. Ranked first in the short and seventh in the free, he finished fourth at his next JGP event in Ljubljana, Slovenia. His results gave him the last spot at the 2016–17 JGP Final in Marseille. In December, he

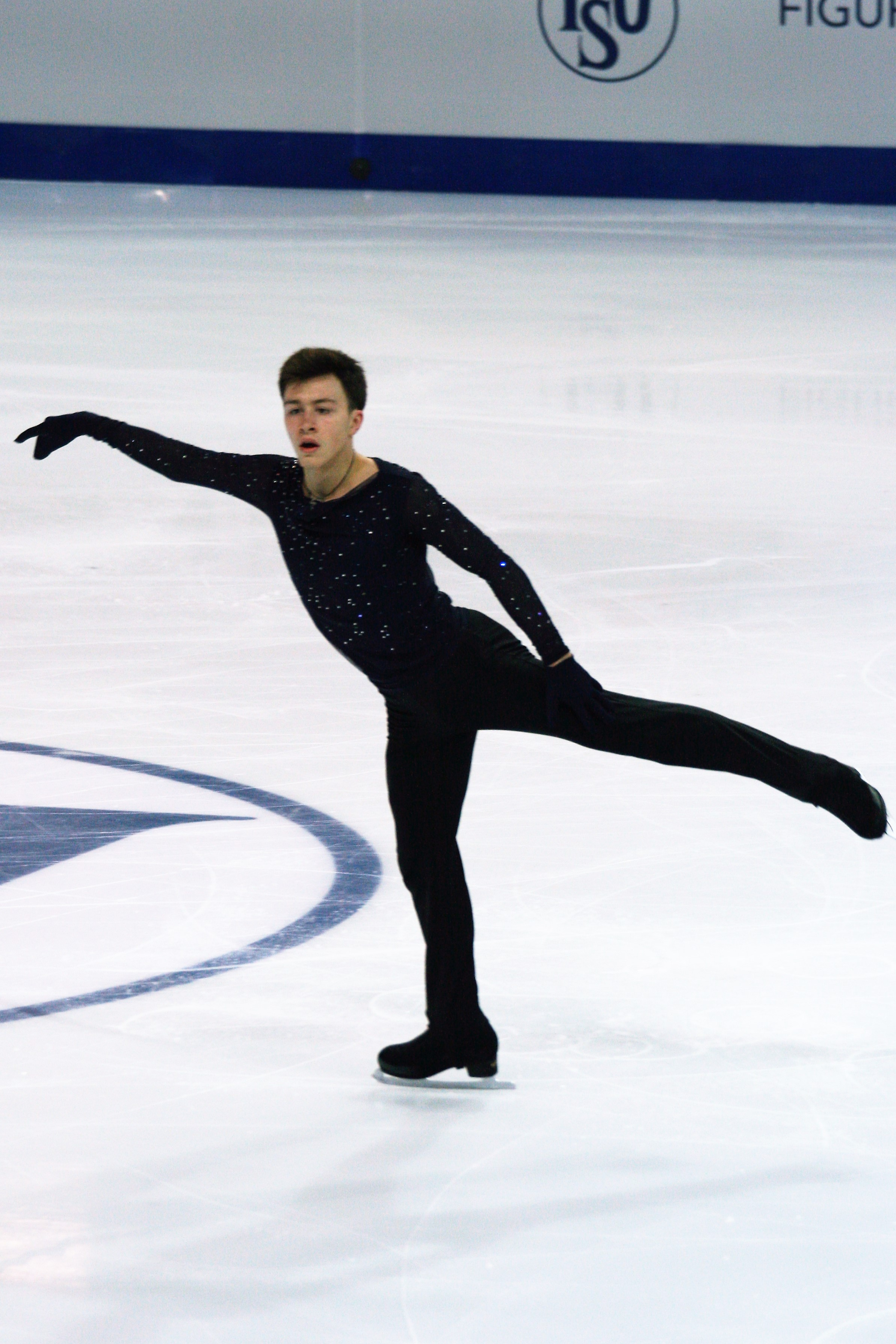
Aliev at the 2016–17 Grand Prix of Figure Skating Final

won the gold medal in France by a margin of 3.55 points over Alexander Samarin. Later that month, Aliev finished fifth at the 2017 Russian Championships in Chelyabinsk.

In early 2017 Aliev won his second junior national title in Saint Petersburg. This result gave him a spot at the 2017 World Junior Championships. He ranked first in the short program, third in the free skate, and second overall in Taipei, Taiwan, winning the silver medal behind American Vincent Zhou and ahead of the teammate Alexander Samarin.

=== 2017–18 season ===
Aliev started his season by placing 1st in the short program at the domestic competition in Saint Petersburg. He landed 4Lz-3T combination, 4T, 3A and scored 99.7 points. He decided to try six quads in two programs, including quad Lutz, quad Salchow and two quad toe loops in the free program.

Aliev was going to compete at the 2017 CS Ondrej Nepela Trophy but withdrew due to ankle inflammation.

In October 2017, Aliev debuted at the Grand Prix series. He placed sixth at the 2017 Rostelecom Cup and eighth at the 2017 NHK Trophy. He then won his first ISU Challenger Series gold medal at the 2017 CS Tallinn Trophy.

Aliev performing a donut spin at the 2018 European Championships

He was third in the 2018 Russian Nationals. In January 2018, he won the silver medal at the 2018 European Championship after placing second in both the short program and the free skate. At the Europeans, he scored his personal best score of 274.06 points.

In February 2018, Aliev finished seventh at the 2018 Winter Olympics and in March 2018, he also placed seventh at the 2018 World Championships.

=== 2018–19 season ===
Aliev started his season at the 2018 CS Lombardia Trophy. Placing third in the short program and second in the free skate, he placed second overall, earning the silver medal. He then competed at the 2018 CS Finlandia Trophy, where he finished fifth. In his Grand Prix events, he placed fifth at 2018 NHK Trophy and fourth at 2018 Internationaux de France. Competing at the 2019 Russian Championships, Aliev had a disastrous short program, falling on an underrotated quad toe loop and completely missing the takeoff on his planned triple Axel. He rose to fifth place overall after placing fourth in the free skate.

Aliev later competed at the Russian Cup Final, hoping to qualify for the Russian World Championships team, but placed ninth.

Aliev at the 2019 Skate America

=== 2019–20 season ===
Beginning on the Challenger series, Aliev won the silver medal at the 2019 CS Lombardia Trophy and then won the 2019 CS Ondrej Nepela Memorial. At his first Grand Prix event, 2019 Skate America, Aliev placed second in the short program, behind Nathan Chen and fractions of a point ahead of Keegan Messing. Errors in the free skate dropped him to third place overall. The bronze medal was his first on the Grand Prix. At the 2019 Rostelecom Cup, Aliev placed second in the short program. He was second in the free skate as well, barely back of the lead, and missed taking the gold medal due to repeating too many jumps and getting his final triple Lutz invalidated for violating the Zayak rule. Aliev's results qualified him for the Grand Prix Final for the first time. After issues with his combination, he placed fourth in the short program, managing only a double jump instead of a triple in the second half. In the free skate, he finished last and dropped to last place overall after falling on several jumps and spins.

Aliev placed fourth in the short program at the 2020 Russian Championships, performing only a triple Lutz instead of his planned quad and putting a hand down on an underrotated triple Axel. Second in the free skate despite two falls, one on a quad toe loop and the other during his step sequence, Aliev captured his first Russian national title.

At the European Championships, Aliev placed second in the short program with 88.45 points, despite under rotations on two of his jumps. In the free skate, Aliev underrotated and put a foot down on his opening quad Lutz, but skating the rest of the program cleanly to finish first in the free skate with a new personal best of 184.44 — over 15 points more than his prior personal best. With a total overall score of 272.89 points, he became Russia's first European men's champion since Evgeni Plushenko in 2012.

Aliev was assigned to compete at the 2020 World Championships in Montreal, but these were cancelled as a result of the coronavirus pandemic.

=== 2020–21 season ===
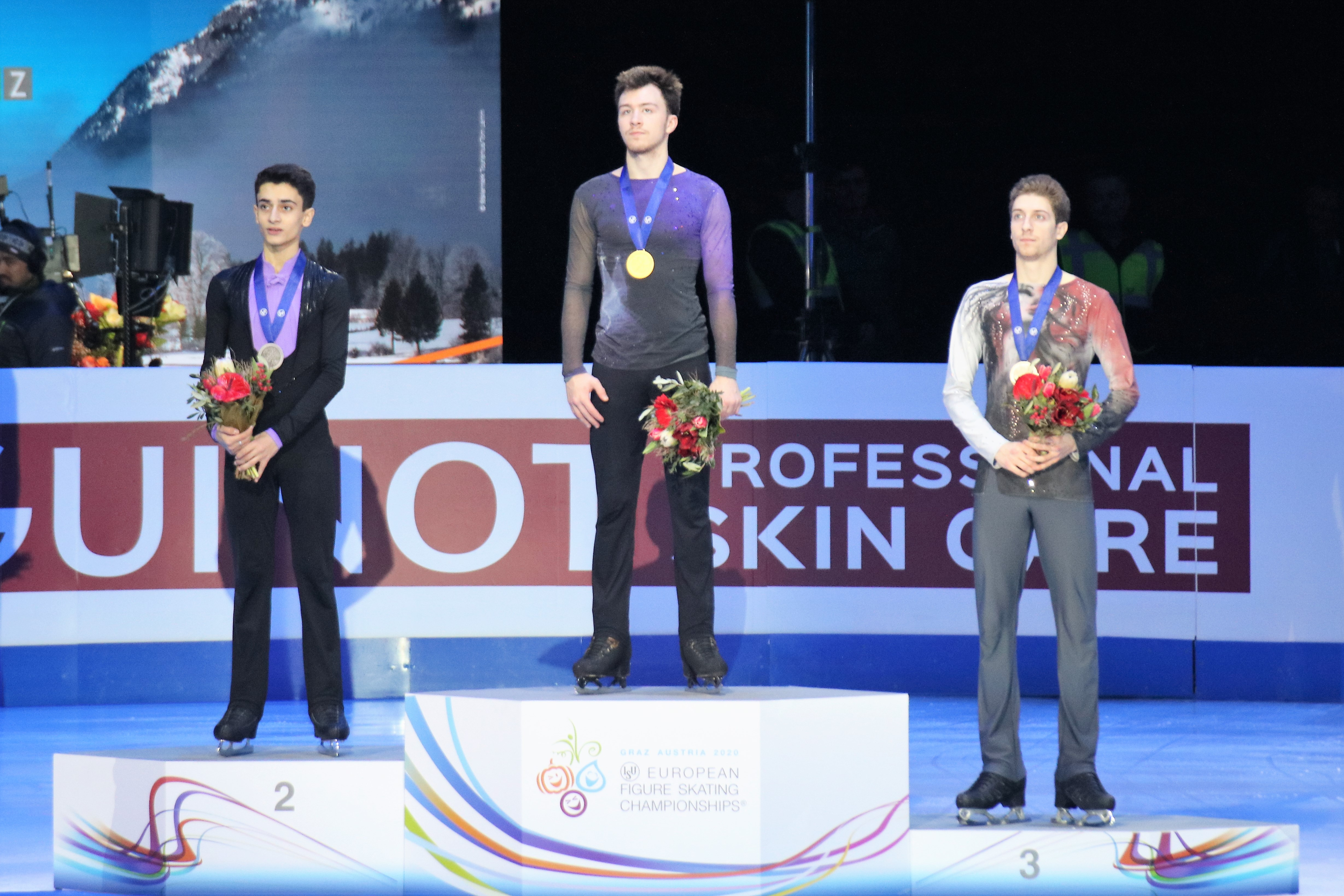
Aliev (middle) winning gold at the 2020 European Figure Skating Championships

Aliev missed the senior Russian test skates as he was receiving treatment for a back injury in Germany. Competing on the domestic Cup of Russia series, he won the bronze medal at the third stage in Sochi.

With the pandemic continuing to affect international travel, the ISU opted to run the Grand Prix based primarily on geographic location. Aliev was assigned to the 2020 Rostelecom Cup, where he placed fifth in the short program after making several errors. He was fifth in the free skate and overall.

On December 3, it was announced that Aliev had to withdraw from the fifth stage of the Russian Cup because he had contracted COVID-19. He did not participate in the 2021 Russian Championships.

Aliev was chosen for the 2021 Channel One Trophy, a televised team event organized in lieu of the cancelled European Championships. He was selected for the Red Machine team captained by Alina Zagitova. Aliev placed fourth in the short program and fifth in the free skate, and the Red Machine team took the trophy. Subsequently, Aliev participated in the Russian Cup Final, which was widely assumed to be the deciding event for the second Russian men's berth at the 2021 World Championships in Stockholm. Aliev placed ninth in the short program after popping his triple Axel to a single and making a quad error. He rose to third place overall with a first-place finish in the free skate.

=== 2021–22 season ===
Aliev made his season debut at the 2021 CS Finlandia Trophy, where he won the bronze medal. The next week he competed at the 2021 Budapest Trophy, finishing in the silver medal position. His first Grand Prix assignment was initially the 2021 Cup of China, but following its cancellation he was reassigned to the 2021 Gran Premio d'Italia in Turin. He placed ninth at the event. He was fifth at the 2021 Internationaux de France.

At the 2022 Russian Championships, Aliev finished in ninth place. He later finished fourth at the Russian Cup Final.

In early March, the ISU banned all figure skaters and officials representing Russia and Belarus from attending the World Championships and international competitions due to the Russian invasion of Ukraine in late February.

=== 2022–23 season ===
Continuing to compete domestically, Aliev won both of his Russian Cup assignments, later placing fourth at the 2023 Russian Championships.

=== 2023–24 season ===
Aliev placed fourth at the 2024 Russian Championships.

=== 2024–25 season ===
Aliev placed ninth at the 2025 Russian Championships.

=== 2025–26 season: Hiatus ===
Aliev missed the entirety of the 2025–26 season due to contracting tuberculosis and having to undergo 6.5 months of chemotherapy. Post-recovery, Aliev returned to training and explained that he would like to continue competing if his health allows him to do so.

== Records and achievements ==
=== Historical world record scores ===
Note: Because of the introduction of the new +5 / -5 GOE (Grade of Execution) system which replaced the previous +3 / -3 GOE system, ISU has decided that all statistics start from zero for the season 2018–19. All previous records are now historical.

Date	Score	Event	Note
10 December 2016	240.07	2016–17 JGP Final	Set the junior-level men's record for the combined total. The record was broken by Vincent Zhou at the 2017 Junior Worlds.

=== Other achievements ===
- The first European skater to have completed three different quad jumps in international competitions: toe loop, Lutz and Salchow.

== Programs ==
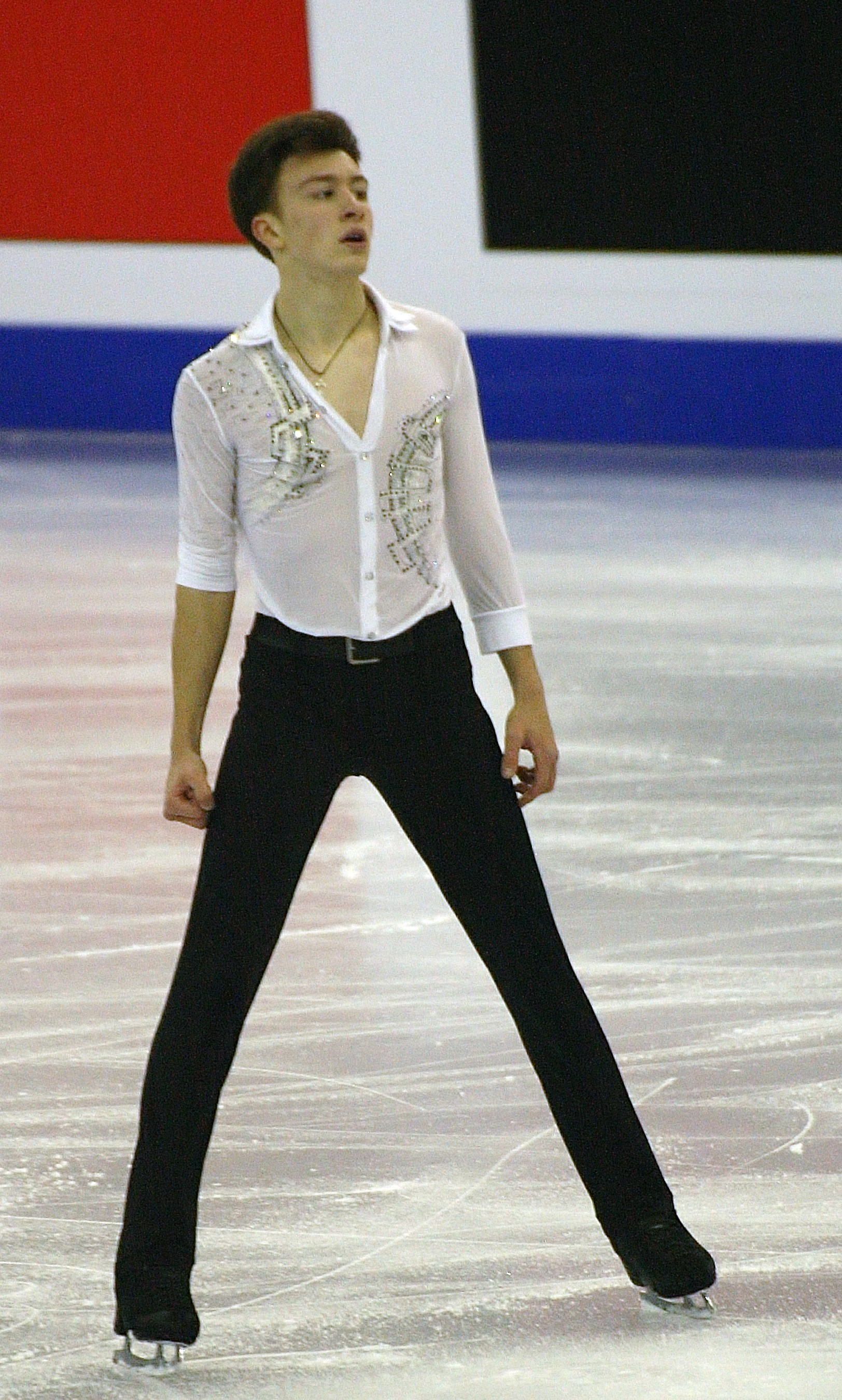
Aliev at the 2015–16 Grand Prix of Figure Skating Final

Aliev at the 2017 Junior World Championships

Season	Short program	Free skating	Exhibition
2024-2025	Blue Eternity by Muslim Magomayev performed by Emin and Alessandro Safina	Onegin's Letter to Tatiana; To Thirst with Love (from Onegin) by Georgy Zheryakov	
2023-2024	And The River Flows by Lyube	Caruso by Lucio Dalla performed by Josh Groban	
2022-2023	I Will Always Love You by Dolly Parton performed by Chase Holfelder	What a Wonderful World by Bob Thiele and George David Weiss performed by Bruno Pelletier; Prologue by The 7 Fingers	
2021–2022	Pilgrims on a Long Journey by Cœur de pirate choreo. by Olga Glinka and Valentin Molotov	And the Waltz Goes On by Anthony Hopkins performed by André Rieu choreo. by Olga Glinka and Valentin Molotov	
2020–2021	Masquerade Waltz by Aram Khachaturian choreo. by Olga Glinka	L'immensità by Johnny Dorelli performed by Il Volo choreo. by Valentin Molotov	Please Be Softer by Alexey Vorobyov
2019–2020	Je dors sur des roses (from Mozart, l'opéra rock) performed by Mikelangelo Loconte choreo. by Olga Glinka, Valentin Molotov	The Sound of Silence by Simon & Garfunkel performed by Disturbed choreo. by Olga Glinka, Valentin Molotov	Always In My Head by Coldplay; They Beat Us, But We Fly by Andrey Ktitarev and Jahan Pollyyeva performed by Nargiz Zakirova
2018–2019	Modigliani Suite by Guy Farley choreo. by Olga Glinka, Valentin Molotov; Midnight Blues by Gary Moore choreo. by Olga Glinka, Valentin Molotov	Clouds, The Mind on the (Re)Wind by Ezio Bosso choreo. by Ilia Averbukh	Return To The Cabin by Harry Gregson-Williams; Fly (from Ice) performed by Anton Belyaev
2017–2018	Masquerade Waltz by Aram Khachaturian choreo. by Olga Glinka	To Build a Home by The Cinematic Orchestra; Little Miss Sunshine by Mychael Danner & DeVotchKa choreo. by Olga Glinka	Pray for Parents from the Voice Russia 5
2016–2017	Oblivion by Astor Piazzolla choreo. by Olga Glinka	Broken Vow performed by Josh Groban; The Man in the Iron Mask by Nick Glennie-Smith choreo. by Valentin Molotov	Horse by Igor Matviyenko and Alexander Shaganov, performed by Lyube; The Man in the Iron Mask by Nick Glennie-Smith choreo. by Valentin Molotov
2015–2016	Nothing the Same by Gary Moore choreo. by Olga Glinka	Notre-Dame de Paris by Riccardo Cocciante; Le Temps des Cathédrales performed by Bruno Pelletier; Tu vas me détruire performed by Daniel Lavoie; choreo. by Valentin Molotov	
2014–2015	Cowboy by ?	Escalier; Derap by Hugues Le Bars	

== Competitive highlights ==
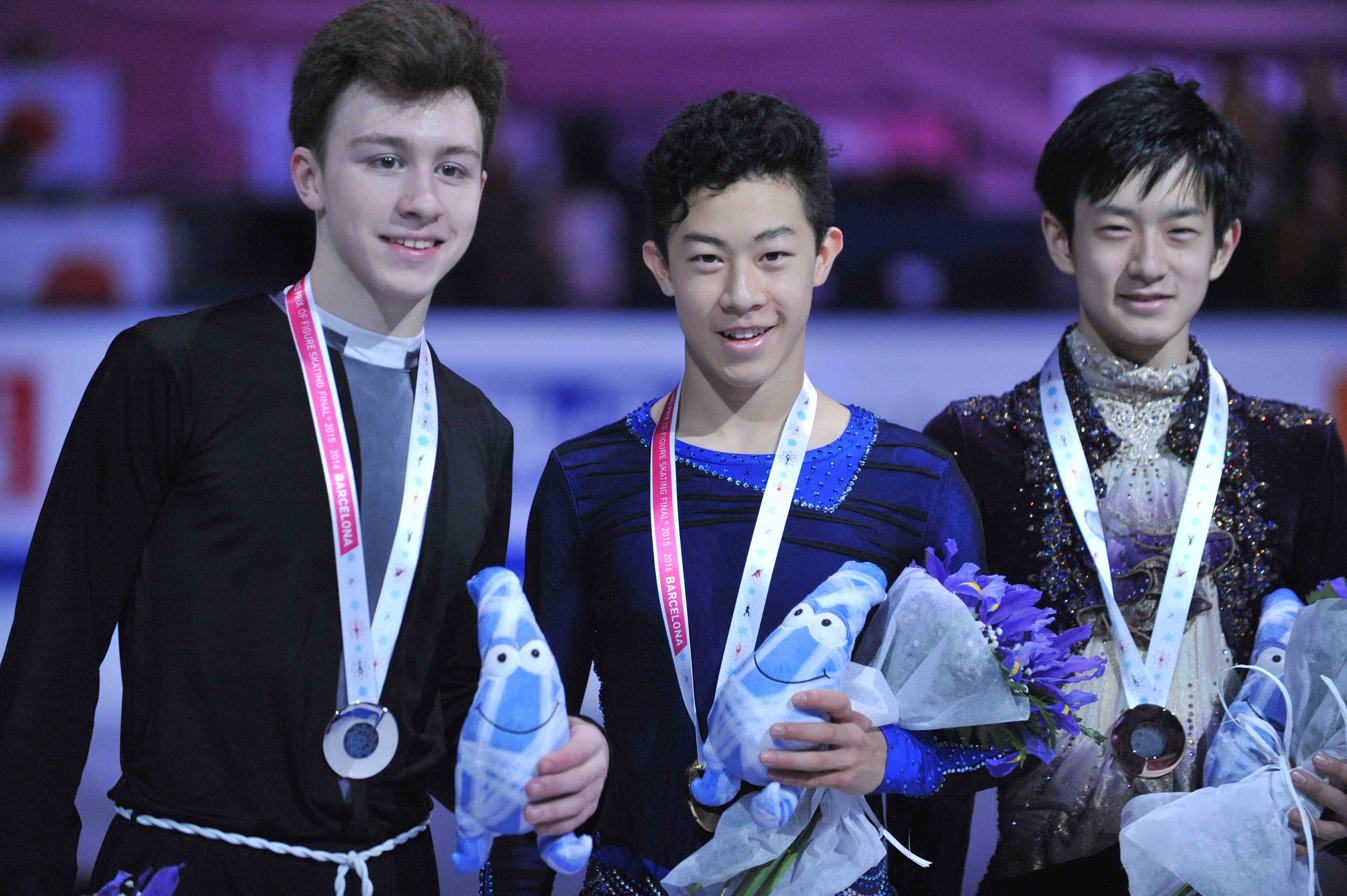
Aliev at the 2015–16 Junior Grand Prix Final podium

GP: Grand Prix; CS: Challenger Series; JGP: Junior Grand Prix

International
Event	14–15	15–16	16–17	17–18	18–19	19–20	20–21	21–22	22-23	23-24	24-25
Olympics				7th							
Worlds				7th		C					
Europeans				2nd		1st					
GP Final						6th					
GP Cup of China								C			
GP France					4th			5th			
GP Italy								9th			
GP NHK Trophy				8th	5th						
GP Rostelecom				6th		2nd	5th				
GP Skate America						3rd					
CS Finlandia					5th			3rd			
CS Golden Spin	10th										
CS Lombardia					2nd	2nd					
CS Nebelhorn Trophy								WD			
CS Ondrej Nepela				WD		1st					
CS Tallinn Trophy		2nd		1st							
CS Warsaw Cup			2nd								
Budapest Trophy								2nd			
Cup of Nice		3rd									
International: Junior
Junior Worlds		6th	2nd								
Youth Olympics		3rd									
JGP Final		2nd	1st								
JGP Austria		1st									
JGP Czech Rep.			1st								
JGP Japan	3rd										
JGP Latvia		1st									
JGP Slovenia	3rd		4th								
EYOF	3rd										
Ice Challenge	1st										
Volvo Open Cup	1st										
National
Russia	10th	6th	5th	3rd	5th	1st	WD	9th	4th	4th	9th
Russia, Junior	3rd	1st	1st								
Russian Cup Final (Note: The 2023 Russian Cup Final was renamed as the 2023 Russian Grand Prix Final.)					9th		3rd	4th	2nd	4th	
Team events
Youth Olympics		1st T 2nd P									

== Detailed results ==
=== Senior level ===
Small medals for short and free programs awarded only at ISU Championships.

2021–22 season
Date	Event	SP	FS	Total
December 21–26, 2021	2022 Russian Championships	12; 86.40	9; 165.00	9; 251.40
November 19–21, 2021	2021 Internationaux de France	5; 85.05	5; 168.51	5; 253.56
November 5–7, 2021	2021 Gran Premio d'Italia	10; 71.07	8; 146.60	9; 217.67
October 14–17, 2021	2021 Budapest Trophy	5; 69.70	2; 160.93	2; 230.63
October 7–10, 2021	2021 CS Finlandia Trophy	5; 78.28	4; 170.97	3; 249.25
2020–21 season
Date	Event	SP	FS	Total
Feb. 26 – Mar. 2, 2021	2021 Russian Cup Final	9; 82.79	1; 172.00	3; 254.79
February 5–7, 2021	2021 Channel One Trophy	4; 93.72	5; 173.56	1T/4P; 267.28
November 20–22, 2020	2020 Rostelecom Cup	5; 89.62	5; 175.49	5; 265.11
2019–20 season
Date	Event	SP	FS	Total
January 20–26, 2020	2020 European Championships	2; 88.45	1; 184.44	1; 272.89
December 24–29, 2019	2020 Russian Championships	4; 87.35	2; 173.63	1; 260.98
December 5–8, 2019	2019–20 Grand Prix Final	4; 88.78	6; 131.26	6; 220.04
November 15–17, 2019	2019 Rostelecom Cup	2; 90.64	2; 169.24	2; 259.88
October 18–20, 2019	2019 Skate America	2; 96.57	3; 156.98	3; 253.55
September 19–21, 2019	2019 CS Ondrej Nepela Memorial	1; 101.49	2; 153.83	1; 255.32
September 13–15, 2019	2019 CS Lombardia Trophy	2; 81.18	1; 168.44	2; 249.62
2018–19 season
Date	Event	SP	FS	Total
February 18–22, 2019	2019 Russian Cup Final	13; 67.21	8; 147.48	9; 214.69
December 19–23, 2018	2019 Russian Championships	8; 71.74	4; 163.74	5; 235.48
November 23–25, 2018	2018 Internationaux de France	9; 75.15	2; 162.67	4; 237.82
November 9–11, 2018	2018 NHK Trophy	3; 81.16	6; 138.36	5; 219.52
October 4–7, 2018	2018 CS Finlandia Trophy	3; 79.36	6; 145.59	5; 224.95
September 12–16, 2018	2018 CS Lombardia Trophy	3; 86.57	2; 163.98	2; 250.55
2017–18 season
Date	Event	SP	FS	Total
March 19–25, 2018	2018 World Championships	13; 82.15	6; 170.15	7; 252.30
February 14–25, 2018	2018 Winter Olympics	5; 98.98	13; 168.53	7; 267.51
January 15–21, 2018	2018 European Championships	2; 91.33	2; 182.73	2; 274.06
December 21–24, 2017	2018 Russian Championships	3; 91.95	2; 157.16	3; 249.11
November 21–26, 2017	2017 CS Tallinn Trophy	2; 80.88	1; 154.22	1; 235.10
November 10–12, 2017	2017 NHK Trophy	7; 77.51	9; 145.94	8; 223.45
October 20–22, 2017	2017 Rostelecom Cup	3; 88.77	7; 150.84	6; 239.61

=== Junior level ===
Small medals for short and free programs awarded only at ISU Championships. At team events, medals awarded for team results only.

2016–17 season
Date	Event	Level	SP	FS	Total
March 15–19, 2017	2017 World Junior Championships	Junior	1; 83.48	3; 163.83	2; 247.31
February 1–5, 2017	2017 Russian Junior Championships	Junior	1; 86.23	1; 161.59	1; 247.82
December 22–25, 2016	2017 Russian Championships	Senior	8; 76.26	4; 164.43	5; 240.69
December 8–11, 2016	2016−17 Junior Grand Prix Final	Junior	1; 81.37	1; 158.70	1; 240.07
November 17–20, 2016	2016 CS Warsaw Cup	Senior	3; 70.70	2; 146.36	2; 217.06
September 22–24, 2016	2016 JGP Slovenia	Junior	1; 78.03	7; 122.88	4; 200.91
Aug. 31 – Sept. 4, 2016	2016 JGP Czech Republic	Junior	1; 77.45	1; 155.38	1; 232.83
2015–16 season
Date	Event	Level	SP	FS	Total
March 14–20, 2016	2016 World Junior Championships	Junior	1; 80.74	7; 130.44	6; 211.18
February 12–21, 2016	2016 Winter Youth Olympics (Team event)	Junior		2; 141.06	1
February 12–21, 2016	2016 Winter Youth Olympics	Junior	5; 67.24	2; 142.53	3; 209.77
January 19–23, 2016	2016 Russian Junior Championships	Junior	1; 85.24	1; 152.52	1; 237.76
December 24–27, 2015	2016 Russian Championships	Senior	7; 81.03	6; 156.44	6; 237.47
December 10–13, 2015	2015−16 Junior Grand Prix Final	Junior	2; 76.78	2; 134.44	2; 211.22
November 17–22, 2015	2015 CS Tallinn Trophy	Senior	4; 71.12	2; 155.60	2; 226.72
October 15–18, 2015	2015 International Cup of Nice	Senior	2; 76.15	3; 141.71	3; 217.86
September 9–13, 2015	2015 JGP Austria	Junior	1; 75.61	1; 150.33	1; 225.94
August 26–30, 2015	2015 JGP Latvia	Junior	6; 60.10	1; 149.82	1; 209.92
2014–15 season
Date	Event	Level	SP	FS	Total
February 4–7, 2015	2015 Russian Junior Championships	Junior	11; 59.83	1; 146.32	3; 206.15
January 26–28, 2015	2015 European Youth Olympic Festival	Junior	3; 62.66	3; 121.82	3; 184.48
December 24–28, 2014	2015 Russian Championships	Senior	12; 64.36	8; 140.10	10; 204.46
December 4–6, 2014	2014 CS Golden Spin of Zagreb	Senior	10; 63.48	10; 116.45	10; 179.93
November 11–16, 2014	2014 Ice Challenge	Junior	1; 69.89	1; 127.20	1; 197.09
November 5–9, 2014	2014 Volvo Open Cup	Junior	1; 60.13	1; 140.08	1; 200.21
September 10–14, 2014	2014 JGP Japan	Junior	3; 66.59	3; 123.23	3; 189.82
August 27–31, 2014	2014 JGP Slovenia	Junior	5; 56.41	3; 129.43	3; 185.84
