= Alena Leonova =

Russian figure skater

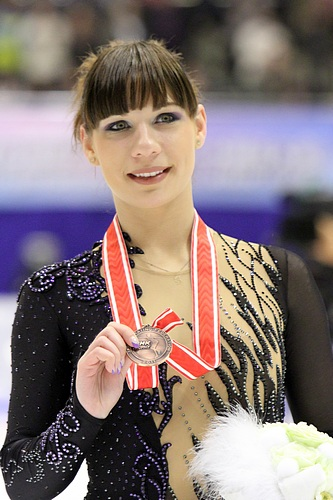
- Leonova with a bronze medal at the 2011 NHK Trophy.

Personal information
- Native name: Алёна Игоревна Леонова
- Full name: Alena Igorevna Leonova
- Born: 23 November 1990 (age 35) Leningrad, Russian SFSR, Soviet Union
- Height: 1.59 m (5 ft 2 1/2 in)

Figure skating career
- Country: Russia
- Coach: Evgeni Rukavicin
- Skating club: Olympic School St. Petersburg
- Began skating: 1993
- Retired: 2021
Medal record
Representing Russia
Figure skating: Ladies' singles
World Championships
Silver medal – second place	2012 Nice	Ladies' singles
Grand Prix Final
Bronze medal – third place	2011–12 Quebec	Ladies' singles
Winter Universiade
Gold medal – first place	2015 Granada	Ladies' singles
Russian Championships
Silver medal – second place	2010 Saint Petersburg	Ladies' singles
Silver medal – second place	2011 Saransk	Ladies' singles
Bronze medal – third place	2012 Saransk	Ladies' singles
World Junior Championships
Gold medal – first place	2009 Sofia	Ladies' singles

Alena Igorevna Leonova (Russian: Алёна Игоревна Леонова; born 23 November 1990) is a retired Russian figure skater. She is the 2012 World silver medalist, the 2011 Grand Prix Final bronze medalist, the 2009 World Junior champion, and a three-time (2010–2012) Russian national medalist. She is also the 2014–15 ISU Challenger Series runner-up.

== Personal life ==
Alena Igorevna Leonova was born on 23 November 1990 in Saint Petersburg (Leningrad). She has a sister and brother, both of whom skated when they were young.

In April 2019, Leonova married figure skater Anton Shulepov. On 18 February 2022, she gave birth to a son, Artemy.

== Career ==
=== Early career ===
Leonova started skating at the age of four. Coached initially by Marina Vakhrameeva, she later moved to the group of Tatiana Mishina, who was assisted by Alla Piatova. Piatova formed her own group and became Leonova's main coach when she was 10.

In her junior career, Leonova became a two-time Cup of Nice gold medalist and won silver at the 2007 Junior Grand Prix in Romania. She also won the silver medal at the 2008 Russian Junior Championships. In August 2008, she partially tore ligaments in her right ankle joint. She placed fourth at the 2009 European Championships. She then won gold at the 2009 World Junior Championships., a surprising win as the focus was on Caroline Zhang, Ashley Wagner, and Elene Gedevanishvili as the leading contenders for the title. After her win, the Russian Federation rented an apartment for her.

=== 2009–10 season ===
Leonova won the bronze medal at the 2009 Cup of Russia and the silver medal at the 2009 NHK Trophy. These results qualified her for the Grand Prix Final, where she placed sixth. She then won the silver medal at the 2010 Russian Championships and was selected to compete at the 2010 Winter Olympics, where she placed ninth. She concluded her season by placing 13th at the 2010 World Championships.

=== 2010–11 season ===
Leonova started her season at the 2010 Coupe de Nice where she won the gold medal. After picking up a pair of bronze medals at the 2010 Finlandia Trophy and 2010 Cup of China, she won another silver medal at the 2011 Russian Championships. Leonova then finished fourth at the 2011 World Championships. Following the event, she began working full-time with Nikolai Morozov in Moscow.

=== 2011–12 season ===
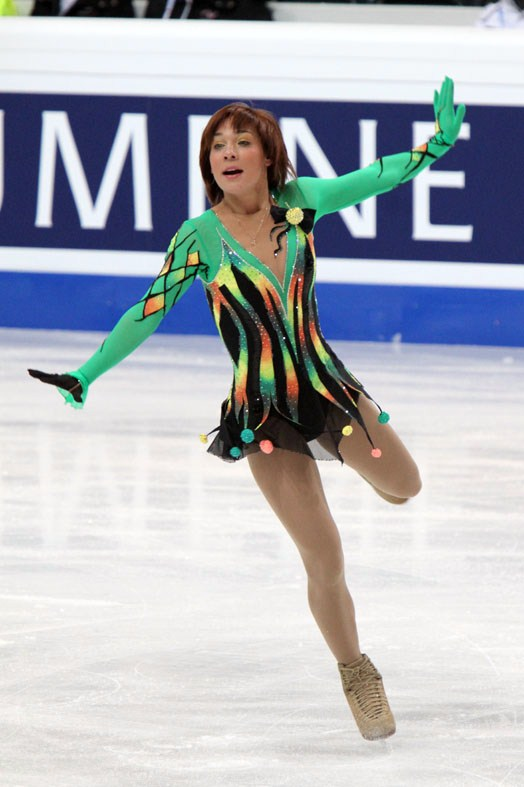
Leonova at the 2011 European Championships

Leonova decided to compete in three Grand Prix events in the 2011–12 season. After placing fourth at the 2011 Skate Canada, she won bronze at 2011 NHK Trophy and silver at 2011 Cup of Russia to qualify for her second Grand Prix Final. At the Grand Prix Final, she won the bronze medal.

Leonova won the bronze medal at the 2012 Russian Championships. At the 2012 European Championships, she finished seventh and sustained an injury to her left knee during the free skate. Leonova placed first in the short program at the 2012 World Championships on her way to her first World medal, a silver. Her podium finish was Russia's first in ladies' singles since 2005 when Irina Slutskaya won the title. Leonova was named Russia's team captain at the 2012 World Team Trophy. Competing with a cold, she finished seventh in the ladies' event.

=== 2012–13 season ===
Leonova finished seventh at the 2012 Skate America. She placed sixth at her next Grand Prix event, the 2012 Rostelecom Cup. Her coach attributed Leonova's poor performances at the events to worn out equipment. Leonova finished seventh at the 2013 Russian Championships where she competed with a new long program that was put together one week before the competition. She was not assigned to the 2013 European Championships because Nikol Gosviani placed ahead of Leonova amongst the age-eligible ladies. Leonova was sent to the 2013 World Championships. She returned to her long program from the previous season and finished thirteenth at the event.

=== 2013–14 season ===
Leonova withdrew from her first 2013–14 Grand Prix event, the 2013 Skate Canada, due to a sprained ankle. Leonova competed in her second event, at the 2013 NHK Trophy and finished seventh. At the 2014 Russian Championships, Leonova placed fourth in the short and seventh in the free, finishing fifth overall. She was assigned to the 2014 European Championships because the skaters in third and fourth place (Elena Radionova and Alexandra Proklova respectively) were not yet age-eligible for senior ISU Championship events. Leonova missed the podium at Europeans, finishing fourth overall. She was coached by Morozov in Novogorsk, Moscow until the end of the season.

=== 2014–15 season ===
In June 2014, Leonova began training under Evgeni Rukavicin in Saint Petersburg. She started the 2014–15 season with a silver medal at the 2014 Nebelhorn Trophy. Her 2014–15 Grand Prix assignments were the 2014 Skate Canada International and 2014 NHK Trophy. She then finished ninth at the 2016 Russian Championships. She ended her season with a win at the Russian Cup Final.

=== 2017–18 season ===
Leonova finished fifth in both the 2017 CS Finlandia Trophy and the 2017 CS Ondrej Nepela Trophy, resulting in her finishing seventh in the 2017–18 ISU Challenger Series. She inished sixth in the 2017 NHK Trophy, earning personal best scores in the free skate and overall score. At the 2017 Skate America she finished in seventh place. Leonova was not selected for a place on the Russian national team.

Leonova at the 2019 Russian Figure Skating Championships

=== 2018–19 season ===
Leonova was invited to the 2018 NHK Trophy after Elena Radionova withdrew due to injury. She finished seventh in the most competitive event of the Grand Prix season, achieving new personal bests in the short program and total score. At the 2019 Russian Championships, she placed twelfth.

=== Skating style ===
Leonova is renowned for either superb technical ability, great style or artistic abilities, or noteworthy consistency, but she increasingly has gained recognition and praise for her unique choreography, on ice personality and delivery of her programs, and speed and attack. Her programs in the 2011 and 2012 seasons, done by renowned choreographer Nikolai Morozov, were noted for their creativity, rather bizarre and off beat quality, and complexity, and her delivery and commitment to them were praised. Early in her career she drew comparisons to former Russian great Irina Slutskaya due to her strong jumping ability and effervescent personality on the ice.

== Programs ==
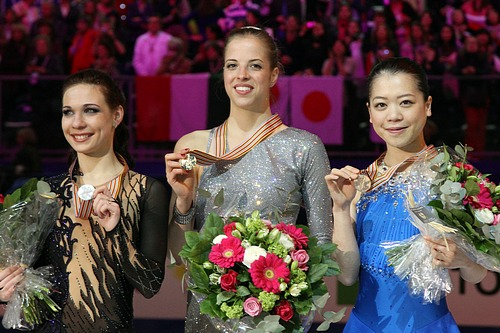
Leonova at the 2012 World Championships

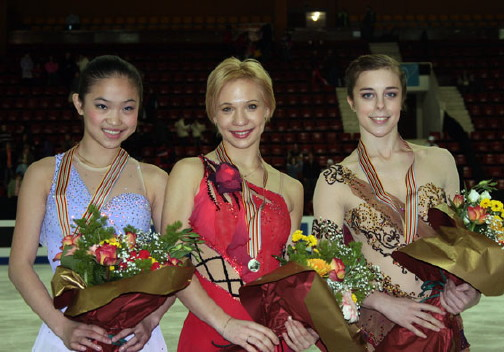
Leonova's gold medal at the 2009 World Junior Championships

Season	Short program	Free skating	Exhibition
2018–19	Separation (Nocturne) by Mikhail Glinka	My Family is My Life...; The Train (from The Legend of Zorro) by James Horner	
2017–18	Bla Bla Bla Cha Cha Cha by Petty Booka	Tune Maari Entriyaan (Bollywood Selection)	
2016–17	It's Oh So Quiet by Björk	The Four Seasons by Antonio Vivaldi	
2015–16	Smile performed by Nat King Cole; Overture - Unveiling the Statue (from City Lights) by Carl Davis; Terry's Theme (from Limelight) by Charlie Chaplin choreo. by Olga Glinka	Summertime performed by Carmen McRae; Jailhouse Rock by Elvis Presley; In Other Words performed by April Stevens; Sing, Sing, Sing (with a Swing) by Benny Goodman performed by The Andrews Sisters choreo. by Olga Kinnard, Michael Seibert	Hurt by Christina Aguilera
2014–15	Smile performed by Nat King Cole; Overture - Unveiling the Statue (from City Lights) by Carl Davis; Terry's Theme (from Limelight) by Charlie Chaplin choreo. by Olga Glinka	Asi se baila el Tango (from Take the Lead); Otono Porteno performed by Ensemble Nuevo Tango choreo. by Olga Glinka	Tanguera by Astor Piazzolla
2013–14	Russian folk: Barynia; Kalinka; Oblivion by Astor Piazzolla; Assassin's Tango (from Mr. & Mrs. Smith) by John Powell	Carmen by Rodion Shchedrin, Georges Bizet	
2012–13	Jai Ho! (You Are My Destiny) by Bond	Adagio for Strings by Samuel Barber; Requiem for a Tower (from Requiem for a Dream) by Clint Mansell performed by Escala; Poeta en la mar by Vicente Amigo	
2011–12	Sirens by Harry Gregson-Williams; Pirates of the Caribbean by Klaus Badelt, Hans Zimmer	Adagio for Strings by Samuel Barber; Requiem for a Tower (from Requiem for a Dream) by Clint Mansell performed by Escala quartet	Your Heart Is As Black As Night by Melody Gardot; Ostanus by Gorod 312
2010–11	Polka (Circus) by Alfred Schnittke; La Strada by Nino Rota	The Witches of Eastwick by John Williams	
2009–10	Barynya (Russian folk music)	Chicago by John Kander	
2008–09	Al Andaluz by Manolo Carrasco	La Leyenda del Beso by Raúl Di Blasio	Ella, elle l'a by Kate Ryan
2007–08	Beethoven's Last Night by Trans-Siberian Orchestra	La Leyenda del Beso by Raúl Di Blasio	
2006–07	Jewish Dance	Scorchio by Tonči Huljić performed by Bond	

== Competitive highlights ==
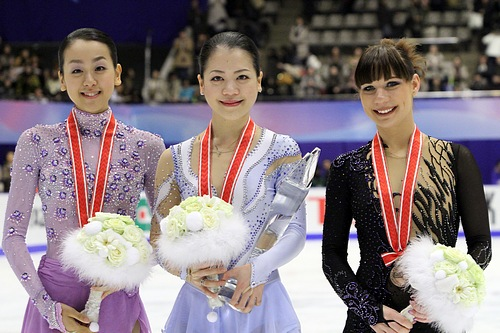
Leonova at the 2011 NHK Trophy

GP: Grand Prix; CS: Challenger Series; JGP: Junior Grand Prix

International
Event	06–07	07–08	08–09	09–10	10–11	11–12	12–13	13–14	14–15	15–16	16–17	17–18	18–19
Olympics				9th									
Worlds			7th	13th	4th	2nd	13th						
Europeans			4th	7th	5th	7th		4th					
GP Final				6th		3rd							
GP Cup of China			7th		3rd								
GP NHK Trophy				2nd		3rd		7th	2nd	8th	WD	6th	7th
GP Rostelecom			5th	3rd	9th	2nd	6th						
GP Skate America							7th					7th	
GP Skate Canada						4th		WD	6th	8th			
GP France											12th		
CS Finlandia												5th	
CS Golden Spin										4th	3rd		
CS Ice Challenge									4th				
CS Nebelhorn									2nd	2nd			
CS Ondrej Nepela											6th	5th	
Universiade									1st		5th		
Cup of Nice			2nd		1st					2nd	4th		
Finlandia Trophy				1st		3rd							
Merano Cup										1st			
International: Junior
Event	06–07	07–08	08–09	09–10	10–11	11–12	12–13	13–14	14–15	15–16	16–17	17–18	18–19
Junior Worlds	12th	6th	1st										
JGP Croatia		5th											
JGP Romania		2nd											
Cup of Nice	1st J	1st J											
National
Russian Champ.	7th	7th	5th	2nd	2nd	3rd	7th	5th	7th	9th	13th	15th	12th
Russian Junior	2nd	2nd											
Team events
World Team; Trophy			5th T 6th P			5th T 7th P							
Japan Open						2nd T 4th P	3rd T 4th P						

== Detailed results ==
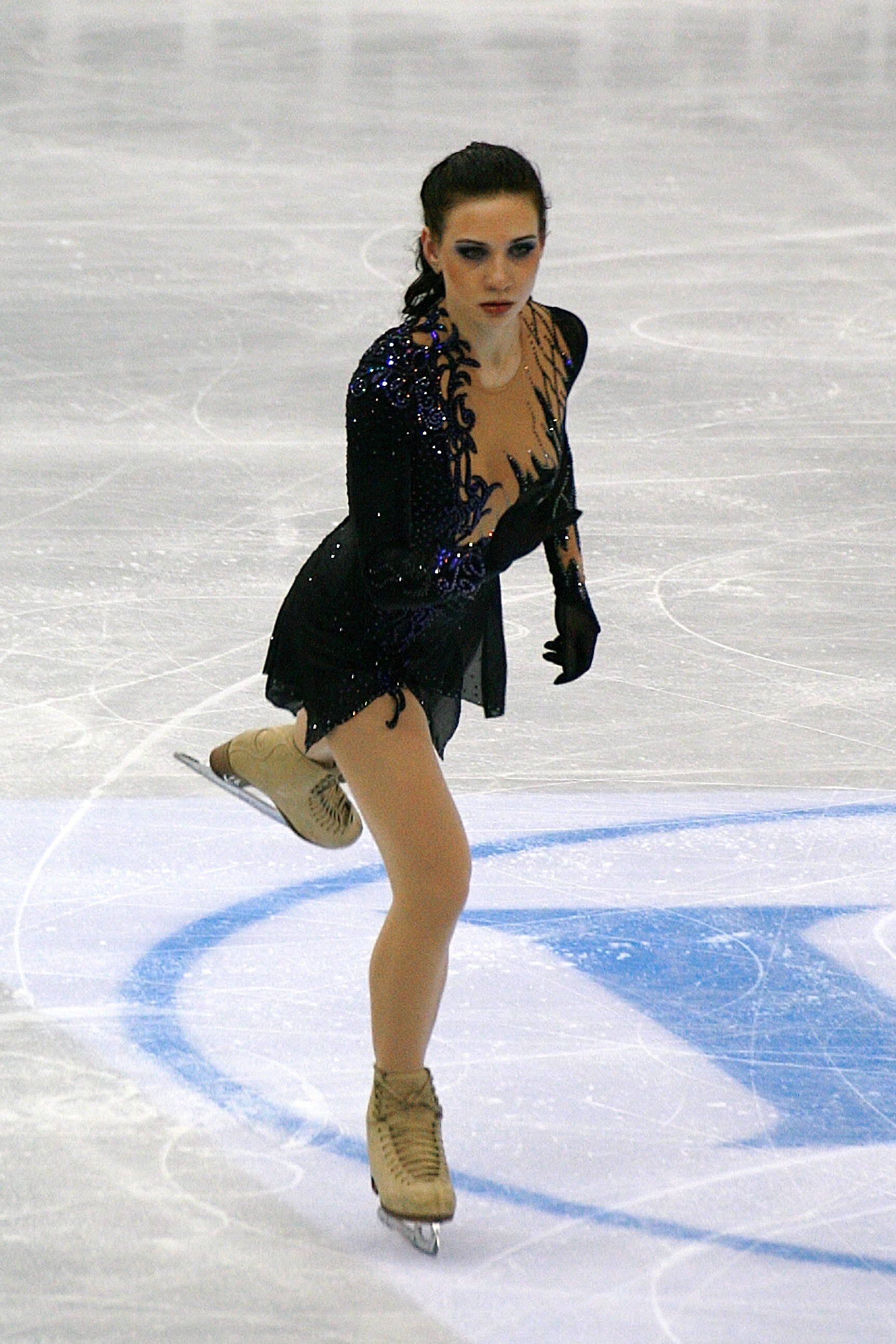
Leonova at the 2012 World Championships

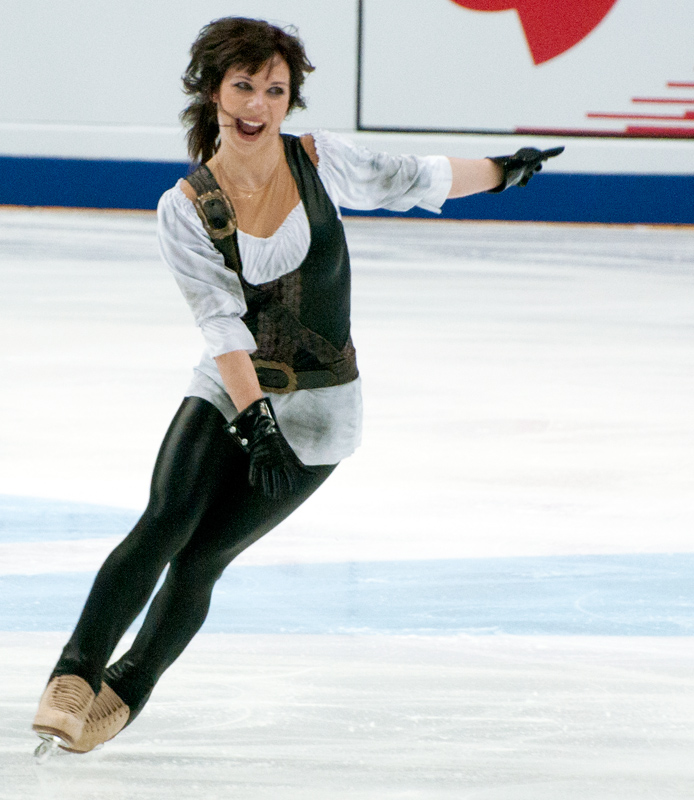
Leonova at the 2011 Cup of Russia

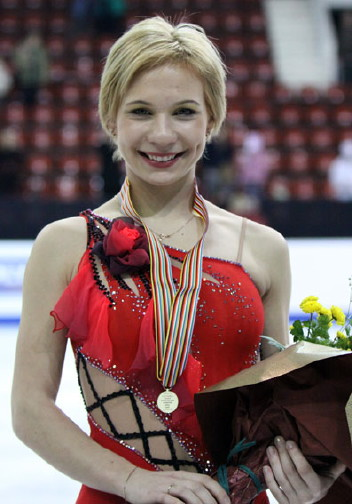
Leonova at the 2009 Junior World Championships

Small medals for short and free programs awarded only at ISU Championships.

2018–19 season
Date	Event	SP	FS	Total
19–23 December 2018	2019 Russian Championships	7; 70.79	13; 128.73	12; 199.52
9–11 November 2018	2018 NHK Trophy	6; 68.22	7; 125.93	7; 194.15
2017–18 season
Date	Event	SP	FS	Total
21–24 December 2017	2018 Russian Championships	16; 62.15	15; 114.57	15; 176.72
24–26 November 2017	2017 Skate America	7; 63.91	7; 122.02	7; 185.93
10–12 November 2017	2017 NHK Trophy	7; 63.61	5; 127.34	6; 190.95
6–8 October 2017	2017 CS Finlandia Trophy	6; 56.73	3; 121.73	5; 178.46
21–23 September 2017	2017 CS Ondrej Nepela Trophy	5; 54.70	5; 115.98	5; 170.68
2016–17 season
Date	Event	SP	FS	Total
1–5 February 2017	2017 Winter Universiade	6; 54.69	4; 116.37	5; 171.06
20–26 December 2016	2017 Russian Championships	11; 60.60	13; 114.07	13; 174.67
7–10 December 2016	2016 CS Golden Spin of Zagreb	3; 64.18	2; 127.21	3; 191.39
11–13 November 2016	2016 Trophée de France	7; 63.87	12; 77.49	12; 141.36
19–23 October 2016	2016 Cup of Nice	4; 54.47	5; 99.55	4; 154.02
29 September – 1 October 2016	2016 CS Ondrej Nepela Memorial	4; 56.84	7; 94.28	6; 151.12
2015–16 season
Date	Event	SP	FS	Total
16–20 February 2016	2015–16 Russian Cup – Final domestic competition	2; 64.78	1; 126.56	1; 191.34
24–27 December 2015	2016 Russian Championships	7; 66.15	9; 124.17	9; 190.32
2–5 December 2015	2015 CS Golden Spin of Zagreb	2; 58.86	4; 114.38	4; 173.24
27–29 November 2015	2015 NHK Trophy	7; 59.63	9; 106.12	8; 165.75
30 October – November 1, 2015	2015 Skate Canada	10; 52.08	8; 108.29	8; 160.37
14–18 October 2015	2015 International Cup of Nice	1; 68.52	2; 110.07	2; 178.59
24–26 September 2015	2015 CS Nebelhorn Trophy	4; 56.41	2; 109.20	2; 165.61
2014–15 season
Date	Event	SP	FS	Total
4–8 February 2015	2015 Winter Universiade	1; 67.12	1; 115.73	1; 182.85
24–27 December 2014	2015 Russian Championships	5; 67.99	7; 116.34	7; 184.33
28–30 November 2014	2014 NHK Trophy	2; 68.11	3; 118.29	2; 186.40
14–16 November 2014	2014 CS Ice Challenge	1; 56.75	5; 91.54	4; 148.29
31 October – 2 November 2014	2014 Skate Canada	3; 62.54	6; 101.61	6; 164.15
25–27 September 2014	2014 CS Nebelhorn Trophy	1; 66.72	3; 119.99	2; 186.71
2013–14 season
Date	Event	SP	FS	Total
15–19 January 2014	2014 European Championships	4; 64.09	5; 114.06	4; 178.15
24–26 December 2013	2014 Russian Championships	4; 67.03	7; 120.45	5; 187.48
8–10 November 2013	2013 NHK Trophy	7; 55.86	7; 106.08	7; 161.94
2012–13 season
Date	Event	SP	FS	Total
10–17 March 2013	2013 World Championships	13; 56.30	14; 102.76	13; 159.06
25–28 December 2012	2013 Russian Championships	6; 59.64	8; 110.00	7; 169.64
9–11 November 2012	2012 Rostelecom Cup	4; 58.85	8; 98.42	6; 157.27
19–21 October 2012	2012 Skate America	9; 46.72	5; 106.77	7; 153.49
2011–12 season
Date	Event	SP	FS	Total
18–22 April 2012	2012 World Team Trophy	9; 50.92	6; 102.79	5T/7P; 153.71
26 March – 1 April 2012	2012 World Championships	1; 64.61	4; 119.67	2; 184.28
23–29 January 2012	2012 European Championships	7; 54.50	6; 104.28	7; 158.78
25–29 December 2011	2012 Russian Championships	5; 59.95	3; 118.20	3; 178.15
8–11 December 2011	2011–12 Grand Prix Final	3; 60.46	4; 115.96	3; 176.42
25–27 November 2011	2011 Rostelecom Cup	2; 63.91	2; 116.54	2; 180.45
11–13 November 2011	2011 NHK Trophy	2; 61.76	4; 108.92	3; 170.68
27–30 October 2011	2011 Skate Canada	7; 49.75	4; 102.47	4; 152.22
2010–11 season
Date	Event	SP	FS	Total
27 April – 1 May 2011	2011 World Championships	5; 59.75	4; 124.17	4; 183.92
24–30 January 2011	2011 European Championships	13; 48.40	3; 105.91	5; 154.31
26–29 December 2010	2011 Russian Championships	3; 60.14	2; 127.54	2; 187.68
18–21 November 2010	2010 Rostelecom Cup	9; 46.61	7; 97.45	9; 144.06
4–7 November 2010	2010 Cup of China	5; 50.79	3; 97.82	3; 148.61
13–17 October 2010	2010 Coupe de Nice	1; 55.52	1; 111.18	1; 166.70
7–10 October 2010	2010 Finlandia Trophy	3; 51.68	6; 83.09	3; 134.77
2009–10 season
Date	Event	SP	FS	Total
22–28 March 2010	2010 World Championships	14; 54.36	14; 98.50	13; 152.86
14–27 February 2010	2010 Winter Olympics	8; 62.14	10; 110.32	9; 172.46
18–24 January 2010	2010 European Championships	5; 58.26	7; 95.31	7; 153.57
23–27 December 2009	2010 Russian Championships	4; 55.70	2; 120.19	2; 175.89
3–6 December 2009	2009–10 Grand Prix Final	3; 61.60	6; 94.95	6; 156.55
5–8 November 2009	2009 NHK Trophy	5; 52.34	1; 108.51	2; 160.85
22–25 October 2009	2009 Rostelecom Cup	4; 56.78	3; 103.28	3; 160.06
8–11 October 2009	2009 Finlandia Trophy	1; 56.24	1; 105.93	1; 162.17
2008–09 season
Date	Event	SP	FS	Total
15–19 April 2009	2009 World Team Trophy	6; 54.72	5; 106.68	5T/6P; 161.40
23–29 March 2009	2009 World Championships	11; 58.18	6; 110.73	7; 168.91
23 February – 1 March 2009	2009 World Junior Championships	3; 55.50	2; 101.68	1; 157.18
20–25 January 2009	2009 European Championships	11; 45.08	4; 98.91	4; 143.99
24–28 December 2008	2009 Russian Championships	3	6	5; 143.49
20–23 November 2008	2008 Cup of Russia	7; 50.96	5; 94.97	5; 145.93
6–9 November 2008	2008 Cup of China	8; 44.04	7; 93.23	7; 137.27
15–19 October 2008	2008 Coupe de Nice	4; 43.40	2; 84.01	2; 127.41
2007–08 season
Date	Event	SP	FS	Total
25 February – 2 March 2008	2008 World Junior Championships	7; 49.76	5; 88.30	6; 138.06
30 January – 2 February 2008	2008 Russian Junior Championships	1	3	2; 140.91
3–7 January 2008	2008 Russian Championships	8	5	7; 132.22
18–21 October 2007	2007 Coupe de Nice	3; 42.42	1; 89.28	1; 131.70
26–29 September 2007	2007 JGP Croatia	10; 37.05	4; 81.03	5; 118.08
6–9 September 2007	2007 JGP Romania	5; 39.64	1; 86.86	2; 126.50
