= 2014 CS Golden Spin of Zagreb =

2014 Golden Spin of Zagreb
- Type: ISU Challenger Series
- Date: December 4 – 6
- Season: 2014–15
- Location: Zagreb
- Venue: Dom sportova

Champions
- Men's singles: (Kazakhstan) Denis Ten
- Ladies' singles: (Finland) Kiira Korpi
- Pairs: (Russia) Kristina Astakhova / Alexei Rogonov
- Ice dance: (United States) Madison Hubbell / Zachary Donohue
- Previous: 2013 Golden Spin of Zagreb
- Next: 2015 CS Golden Spin of Zagreb

The 2014 Golden Spin of Zagreb (Croatian: Zlatna pirueta Zagreba) was the 47th edition of the annual senior-level international figure skating competition held in Zagreb, Croatia. A part of the 2014–15 ISU Challenger Series, event was held at the Dom sportova on December 4–6, 2014. Medals were awarded in the disciplines of men's singles, ladies' singles, pair skating, and ice dancing.

== Medalists ==
Discipline	Gold	Silver	Bronze
Men	(Kazakhstan) Denis Ten	(Czech Republic) Michal Březina	(Russia) Konstantin Menshov
Ladies	(Finland) Kiira Korpi	(Russia) Maria Artemieva	(Slovakia) Nicole Rajičová
Pairs	(Russia) Kristina Astakhova / Alexei Rogonov	(Italy) Valentina Marchei / Ondřej Hotárek	(United States) Tarah Kayne / Daniel O'Shea
Ice dancing	(United States) Madison Hubbell / Zachary Donohue	(Italy) Charlene Guignard / Marco Fabbri	(Spain) Sara Hurtado / Adria Diaz

== Results ==
=== Men ===
Rank	Name	Nation	Total points	SP		FS	
1	Denis Ten	Kazakhstan	249.94	1	92.51	2	157.43
2	Michal Březina	Czech Republic	239.62	3	81.62	1	158.00
3	Konstantin Menshov	Russia	229.51	2	83.18	4	146.33
4	Grant Hochstein	United States	219.82	6	69.69	3	150.13
5	Moris Kvitelashvili	Russia	207.77	7	66.16	5	141.61
6	Michael Christian Martinez	Philippines	204.45	4	74.45	6	130.00
7	Ivan Righini	Italy	200.80	7	71.79	5	129.01
8	Alexander Samarin	Russia	193.97	8	65.88	8	128.09
9	Phillip Harris	United Kingdom	182.18	11	59.13	9	123.05
10	Dmitri Aliev	Russia	179.93	10	63.48	10	116.45
11	Tomi Pulkkinen	Finland	175.71	9	65.63	13	110.08
12	Christopher Berneck	Germany	173.98	12	58.26	11	115.72
13	Carlo Vittorio Palermo	Italy	166.96	16	54.78	12	112.18
14	Sondre Oddvoll Bøe	Norway	164.40	13	56.15	14	108.25
15	Pavel Ignatenko	Belarus	157.55	14	55.69	16	101.86
16	Vladislav Tarasenko	Russia	155.44	15	55.61	18	99.83
17	Alexander Bjelde	Germany	152.84	17	53.89	19	98.95
18	Panagiotis Polizoakis	Germany	150.60	18	50.46	17	100.14
19	Charlie Parry-Evans	United Kingdom	144.12	19	48.29	20	95.83
20	Tomáš Kupka	Czech Republic	141.52	21	39.59	15	101.93
21	Ali Demirboga	Turkey	132.11	20	43.11	21	89.00
22	Mario-Rafael Ionian	Austria	118.33	22	39.27	22	79.06

=== Ladies ===
Rank	Name	Nation	Total points	SP		FS	
1	Kiira Korpi	Finland	167.81	4	56.22	1	111.59
2	Maria Artemieva	Russia	166.48	1	59.59	2	106.89
3	Nicole Rajičová	Slovakia	159.55	6	53.27	3	106.28
4	Daša Grm	Slovenia	150.32	7	52.81	4	97.51
5	Diana Pervushkina	Russia	148.56	5	53.57	5	94.99
6	Isabelle Olsson	Sweden	148,10	2	58.73	10	89.37
7	Aleksandra Golovkina	Lithuania	145.87	9	50.98	6	94.89
8	Mariah Bell	United States	144.80	8	51.08	7	93.72
9	Anne Line Gjersem	Norway	139.88	10	50.62	11	89.26
10	Sonia Lafuente	Spain	138.96	12	48.29	8	90.67
11	Nicole Schott	Germany	137.41	3	56.46	15	80.95
12	Karly Robertson	United Kingdom	136.60	13	46.86	9	89.74
13	Kerstin Frank	Austria	134.79	11	50.41	13	84.38
14	Roberta Rodeghiero	Italy	128.26	18	42.98	12	85.28
15	Anna Khnychenkova	Ukraine	126.35	15	43.80	14	82.55
16	Alexandra Kunová	Slovakia	120.78	19	42.89	16	77.89
17	Natalia Popova	Ukraine	112.63	14	43.87	17	68.76
18	Elizaveta Ukolova	Czech Republic	108.66	16	43.43	21	65.23
19	Reyna Hamui	Mexico	108.54	17	43.29	19	65.26
20	Janina Makeenka	Belarus	106.93	20	41.75	22	65.18
21	Daniela Stoeva	Bulgaria	103.46	21	36.75	18	66.71
22	Birce Atabey	Turkey	100.05	22	34.81	20	65.24
23	Bronislava Dobiášová	Slovakia	96.55	24	32.54	23	64.01
24	Pina Umek	Slovenia	89.02	23	34.10	25	54.92
25	Nika Cerič	Slovenia	87.24	25	30.18	24	57.06
26	Tena Čopor	Croatia	79.10	26	27.03	27	52.07
27	Valentina Mikac	Croatia	78.66	27	25.00	26	53.66

=== Pairs ===
Rank	Name	Nation	Total points	SP		FS	
1	Kristina Astakhova / Alexei Rogonov	Russia	184.24	1	56.58	1	127.66
2	Valentina Marchei / Ondřej Hotárek	Italy	167.18	2	55.18	2	112.00
3	Tarah Kayne / Daniel O'Shea	United States	161.72	3	50.72	3	111.00
4	Caitlin Yankowskas / Hamish Gaman	United Kingdom	134.18	4	49.10	5	85.08
5	Alessandra Cernuschi / Filippo Ambrosini	Italy	134.16	5	45.66	4	88.50
6	Tatiana Danilova / Mikalai Kamianchuck	Belarus	133.10	7	38.72	6	74.38
7	Elizaveta Usmantseva / Roman Talan	Ukraine	111.92	6	41.84	7	70.08
8	Elizaveta Makarova / Leri Kenchadze	Bulgaria	102.06	8	36.26	8	65.80
9	Oľga Beständigová / İlhan Mansız	Turkey	74.90	9	29.84	9	45.06

=== Ice dancing ===
Rank	Name	Nation	Total points	SD		FD	
1	Madison Hubbell / Zachary Donohue	United States	166.74	2	66.40	1	100.34
2	Charlène Guignard / Marco Fabbri	Italy	166.46	1	66.40	2	100.06
3	Sara Hurtado / Adrià Díaz	Spain	150.00	3	59.38	3	90.62
4	Oleksandra Nazarova / Maxim Nikitin	Ukraine	148.48	4	58.20	4	90.28
5	Evgenia Kosigina / Nikolai Moroshkin	Russia	133.62	5	52.00	5	81.62
6	Olesia Karmi / Max Lindholm	Finland	122.54	6	49.24	6	73.30
7	Karina Uzurova / Ilias Ali	Kazakhstan	116.46	8	45.90	7	70.56
8	Celia Robledo / Luis Fenero	Spain	114.48	7	47.48	8	67.00
9	Marie-Jade Lauriault / Romain Le Gac	France	109.48	9	43.62	9	65.86
10	Çağla Demirsal / Berk Akalın	Turkey	102.60	10	37.52	10	65.08
11	Valeria Haistruk / Oleksiy Oliynyk	Ukraine	101.00	11	36.84	11	64.16
