= Figure skating at the 2015 Winter Universiade – Ice dance =

The ice dancing competition of the figure skating at the 2015 Winter Universiade was held at the Universiade Igloo in Granada. The short dance was held on February 6 and the free dance was held on February 7.

== Results ==
=== Short dance ===
Pl.	Name	Nation	TSS	TES	PCS	SS	TR	PE	CH	IN	Ded	StN
1	Charlène Guignard / Marco Fabbri	Italy	64.44	33.76	30.68	7.65	7.55	7.65	7.65	7.85	0.00	4
2	Sara Hurtado / Adrià Díaz	Spain	63.12	32.76	30.36	7.35	7.35	7.75	7.65	7.85	0.00	7
3	Federica Testa / Lukáš Csölley	Slovakia	53.04	25.88	27.16	6.75	6.65	6.65	6.95	6.95	0.00	10
4	Evgenia Kosigina / Nikolai Moroshkin	Russia	52.10	25.74	26.36	6.70	6.35	6.65	6.60	6.65	0.00	11
5	Karina Uzurova / Ilias Ali	Kazakhstan	46.86	26.06	20.80	5.30	5.00	5.25	5.35	5.10	0.00	6
6	Chen Hong / Zhao Yan	China	45.98	24.46	21.52	5.60	5.10	5.45	5.45	5.30	0.00	13
7	Jennifer Urban / Sevan Lerche	Germany	44.76	25.72	20.04	5.05	4.80	5.10	5.10	5.00	-1.00	5
8	Celia Robledo / Luis Fenero	Spain	44.16	25.16	19.00	4.65	4.50	4.90	4.85	4.85	0.00	2
9	Lolita Yermak / Oleksiy Shumsky	Ukraine	42.38	22.10	20.28	5.10	4.80	5.30	5.25	4.90	0.00	8
10	Laureline Aubry / Kévin Bellingard	France	42.08	23.80	18.28	4.60	4.450	4.60	4.80	4.40	0.00	9
11	Song Linshu / Liu Yu	China	40.04	29.96	18.08	4.70	4.35	4.75	4.60	4.20	-1.00	1
12	Kei Nishimura / Kentaro Suzuki	Japan	34.04	16.84	17.20	4.45	4.10	4.35	4.45	4.15	0.00	3
13	Sun Wenqian / Wang Kuo	China	34.02	17.70	16.32	4.10	3.90	4.15	4.30	3.95	0.00	12

=== Free dance ===
Pl.	Name	Nation	TSS	TES	PCS	SS	TR	PE	CH	IN	Ded	StN
1	Charlène Guignard / Marco Fabbri	Italy	100.54	52.00	48.54	8.05	7.85	8.20	8.15	8.20	0.00	9
2	Sara Hurtado / Adrià Díaz	Spain	100.44	51.90	48.54	7.90	7.80	8.15	8.30	8.30	0.00	13
3	Federica Testa / Lukáš Csölley	Slovakia	89.72	46.82	42.90	7.00	6.95	7.25	7.30	7.25	0.00	11
4	Evgenia Kosigina / Nikolai Moroshkin	Russia	86.52	44.82	41.70	6.95	6.70	6.95	7.15	7.00	0.00	10
5	Chen Hong / Zhao Yan	China	76.68	43.08	33.60	5.80	5.45	5.60	5.50	5.65	0.00	8
6	Celia Robledo / Luis Fenero	Spain	74.54	42.48	33.06	5.40	5.25	5.65	5.70	5.55	-1.00	6
7	Jennifer Urban / Sevan Lerche	Germany	73.60	41.20	32.40	5.40	5.20	5.55	5.50	5.35	0.00	7
8	Karina Uzurova / Ilias Ali	Kazakhstan	72.16	37.90	34.26	5.80	5.65	5.75	5.75	5.70	0.00	12
9	Lolita Yermak / Oleksiy Shumsky	Ukraine	68.62	37.26	32.16	5.20	5.10	5.30	5.65	5.55	-1.00	5
10	Laureline Aubry / Kévin Bellingard	France	68.22	39.58	29.64	4.85	4.70	5.00	5.20	4.95	-1.00	3
11	Song Linshu / Liu Yu	China	62.56	36.68	26.88	4.55	4.15	4.65	4.60	4.45	-1.00	2
12	Kei Nishimura / Kentaro Suzuki	Japan	60.80	33.42	28.38	4.60	4.50	4.85	4.95	4.75	-1.00	4
13	Sun Wenqian / Wang Kuo	China	52.86	28.92	23.94	4.05	3.70	4.10	4.25	3.85	0.00	1

=== Overall ===
Rank	Name	Nation	TP	SP		FS	
1st place, gold medalist(s)	Charlène Guignard / Marco Fabbri	Italy	164.98	1	64.44	1	100.54
2nd place, silver medalist(s)	Sara Hurtado / Adrià Díaz	Spain	163.56	2	63.12	2	100.44
3rd place, bronze medalist(s)	Federica Testa / Lukáš Csölley	Slovakia	142.76	3	53.04	3	89.72
4	Evgenia Kosigina / Nikolai Moroshkin	Russia	138.62	4	52.10	4	86.52
5	Chen Hong / Zhao Yan	China	122.66	6	45.98	5	76.68
6	Karina Uzurova / Ilias Ali	Kazakhstan	119.02	5	46.86	8	72.16
7	Celia Robledo / Luis Fenero	Spain	118.70	8	44.16	6	74.54
8	Jennifer Urban / Sevan Lerche	Germany	118.36	7	44.76	7	73.60
9	Lolita Yermak / Oleksiy Shumsky	Ukraine	111.00	9	42.38	9	68.62
10	Laureline Aubry / Kévin Bellingard	France	110.30	10	42.08	10	68.22
11	Song Linshu / Liu Yu	China	102.60	11	40.04	11	62.56
12	Kei Nishimura / Kentaro Suzuki	Japan	94.84	12	34.04	12	60.80
13	Sun Wenqian / Wang Kuo	China	86.88	13	34.02	13	52.86
