= Karina Uzurova =

Kazakhstani former ice dancer (born 1997)

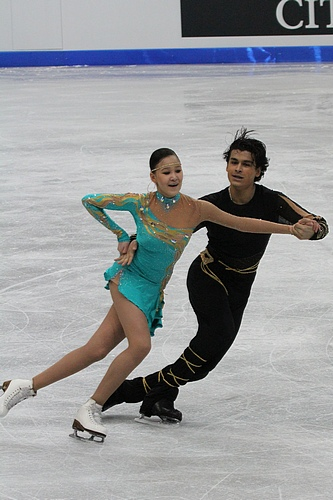
- Uzurova/Ali in 2012

Personal information
- Born: 25 January 1997 (age 29) Almaty, Kazakhstan
- Height: 1.75 m (5 ft 9 in)

Figure skating career
- Country: Kazakhstan
- Partner: Ilias Ali; Aaron Chapplain
- Coach: Anjelika Krylova; Pasquale Camerlengo; Natalia Deller; Kuralay Uzurova; Maia Usova; Alexei Gorshkov
- Skating club: Kiyal Almaty
- Began skating: 2003
- Retired: 2016

Karina Uzurova (born 25 January 1997) is a Kazakhstani former ice dancer. With Ilias Ali, she competed in the final segment at two ISU Championships and finished sixth at the 2015 Winter Universiade.

== Personal life ==
Uzurova was born on 25 January 1997 in Almaty. She studied at the Kazakh Academy of Sport and Tourism in Almaty. She is the daughter of ice dancing coach Kuralay Uzurova.

== Career ==
Uzurova began learning to skate as a six-year-old, in 2003. She teamed up with Ilias Ali in November 2009. The two made their international debut in September 2010, competing at 2010–11 ISU Junior Grand Prix events in Braşov, Romania, and Karuizawa, Japan. In March, they competed at the 2011 World Junior Championships in Gangneung, South Korea. Ranked 7th in the preliminary round and 17th in the short dance, they qualified to the final segment and went on to finish 17th overall. During the season, they trained in Almaty, Kazakhstan, and Odintsovo, Russia, coached by Kuralay Uzurova and Alexei Gorshkov.

In the 2011–12 ISU Junior Grand Prix season, Uzurova/Ali placed 7th in Riga, Latvia, and 15th in Gdańsk, Poland. In January, they competed at the 2012 Winter Youth Olympics in Innsbruck, Austria; they ranked fifth in the short dance, sixth in the free dance, and sixth overall. The following month, at the 2012 World Junior Championships in Minsk (Belarus), they placed 11th in the preliminary round and 22nd in the short dance, which meant that they did not qualify to the free dance. They were coached by Uzurova and Gorshkov until the end of the season.

Competing in the 2012–13 ISU Junior Grand Prix series, Uzurova/Ali placed 10th in Bled, Slovenia, and 7th in Zagreb, Croatia. Kuralay Uzurova and Maia Usova served as their coaches. The skaters made no international appearances the following season due to Ali's injury.

In 2014, Uzurova/Ali began training in Bloomfield Hills, Michigan, coached by Anjelika Krylova, Pasquale Camerlengo, and Natalia Deller. Making their senior international debut, the duo finished 7th at the 2014 CS Golden Spin of Zagreb in December. In February, they placed 5th in the short dance, 8th in the free dance, and 6th overall at the 2015 Winter Universiade in Granada, Spain. A week later, they competed at their final event together, the 2015 Four Continents Championships in Seoul, South Korea, where they finished 12th.

The following season, Uzurova briefly competed with Canada's Aaron Chapplain, placing 11th at the 2015 CS Tallinn Trophy in November. The two were coached by Krylova, Camerlengo, and Deller in Michigan.

== Programs ==
=== With Chapplain ===
Season	Short dance	Free dance
2015–2016	Waltz: Julia's Theme (from Julie & Julia) by Alexandre Desplat; Foxtrot: For Me Formidable by Charles Aznavour	Exogenesis: Symphony Part 3 (Redemption) by Muse

=== With Ali ===
Season	Short dance	Free dance
2014–2015	Paso doble	It's a Man's Man's Man's World by James Brown; Swing; I Got You (I Feel Good) by James Brown
2012–2013	Blues: Only You; Swing choreo. by Maia Usova	Notre-Dame de Paris by Riccardo Cocciante; Live for the One I Have; The Age of the Cathedrals; The Refugees choreo. by Maia Usova
2011–2012	Cha-cha; Rhumba: Historia de un Amor choreo. by Sergei Petukhov	Arabica; East Echo; Arabica choreo. by Sergei Petukhov
2010–2011	Waltz: My Sweet and Tender Beast by Eugen Doga choreo. by Sergei Petukhov	Blues for Klook by Eddy Louiss choreo. by Sergei Petukhov

== Competitive highlights ==
CS: Challenger Series; JGP: Junior Grand Prix

=== With Chapplain ===
International
Event	2015–16
CS Tallinn Trophy	11th

=== With Ali ===
International
Event	09–10	10–11	11–12	12–13	13–14	14–15
Four Continents						12th
CS Golden Spin						7th
Universiade						6th
International: Junior
Junior Worlds		17th	22nd			
Youth Olympics			6th			
JGP Croatia				7th		
JGP Japan		12th				
JGP Latvia			7th			
JGP Poland			15th			
JGP Romania		11th				
JGP Slovenia				10th		
Ice Challenge		5th				
Istanbul Cup			6th			
Mont Blanc Trophy		6th				
NRW Trophy		12th	10th			
Santa Claus Cup		3rd	7th			
Trophy of Lyon		4th				
National
Kazakhstan	1st		1st	1st	1st	
