= Charlène Guignard =

French-Italian ice dancer (born 1989)

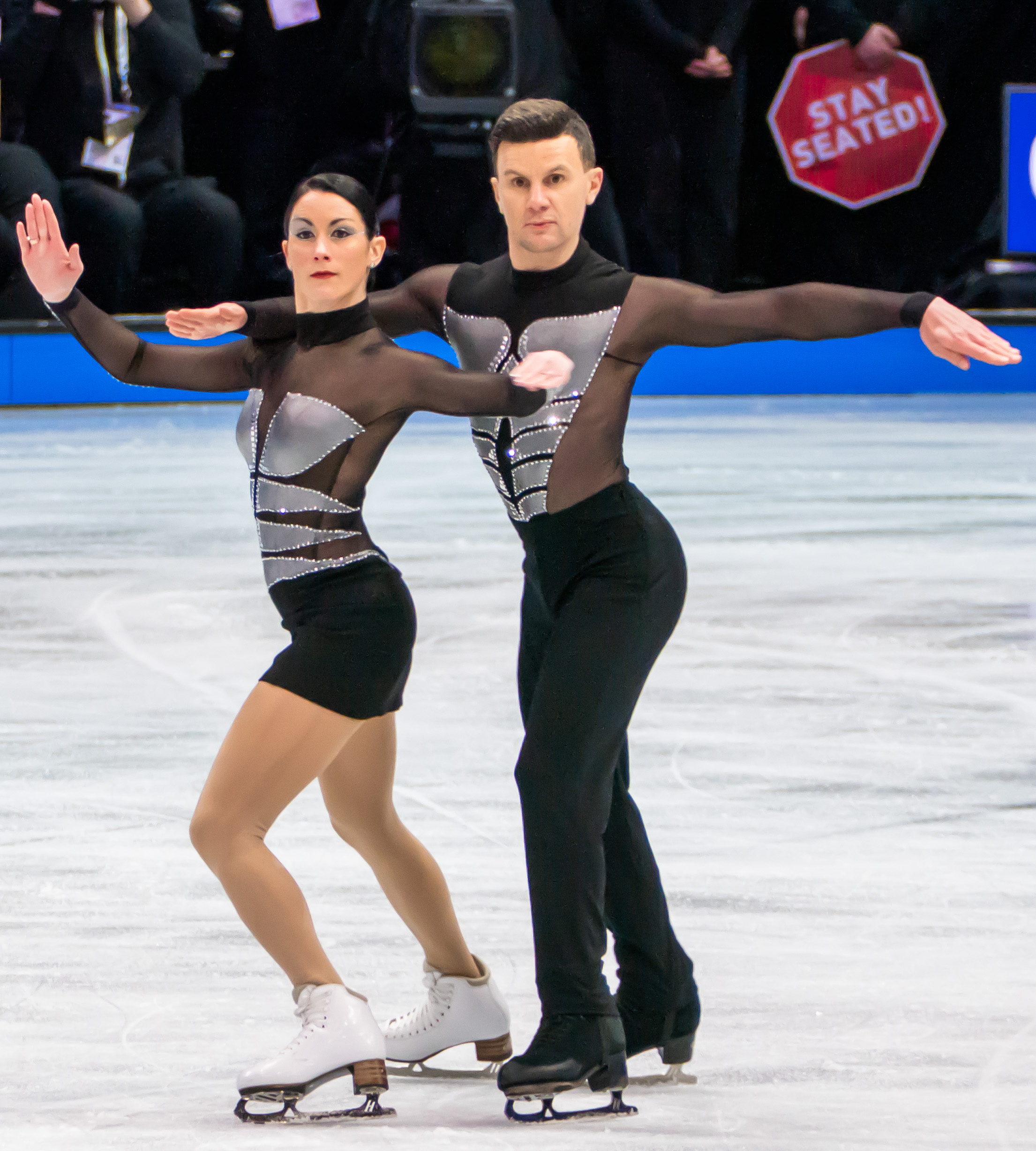
- Charlène Guignard and Marco Fabbri during their free dance at the 2025 World Championships

Personal information
- Full name: Charlène Edith Magali Guignard
- Born: 12 August 1989 (age 37) Brest, France
- Height: 1.61 m (5 ft 3 in)

Figure skating career
- Country: Italy (since 2010); France (2006–09)
- Discipline: Ice dance
- Partner: Marco Fabbri (since 2010); Guillaume Paulmier (2006–09)
- Coach: Barbara Fusar-Poli; Roberto Pelizzola
- Skating club: G.S. Fiamme Azzurre
- Began skating: 1993
- Highest WS: 2nd (2019-20)

Medal record
Event	Gold medal – first place	Silver medal – second place	Bronze medal – third place
Olympic Games	0	0	1
World Championships	0	1	1
European Championships	3	1	2
Grand Prix Final	0	2	2
Italian Championships	8	8	0
World Team Trophy	0	0	1
Medal list
Olympic Games
Bronze medal – third place	2026 Milano Cortina	Team
World Championships
Silver medal – second place	2023 Saitama	Ice dance
Bronze medal – third place	2024 Montreal	Ice dance
European Championships
Gold medal – first place	2023 Espoo	Ice dance
Gold medal – first place	2024 Kaunas	Ice dance
Gold medal – first place	2025 Tallinn	Ice dance
Silver medal – second place	2026 Sheffield	Ice dance
Bronze medal – third place	2019 Minsk	Ice dance
Bronze medal – third place	2022 Tallinn	Ice dance
Grand Prix Final
Silver medal – second place	2023–24 Beijing	Ice dance
Silver medal – second place	2024–25 Grenoble	Ice dance
Bronze medal – third place	2018–19 Vancouver	Ice dance
Bronze medal – third place	2022–23 Turin	Ice dance
Italian Championships
Gold medal – first place	2019 Trento	Ice dance
Gold medal – first place	2020 Bergamo	Ice dance
Gold medal – first place	2021 Egna	Ice dance
Gold medal – first place	2022 Turin	Ice dance
Gold medal – first place	2023 Brunico	Ice dance
Gold medal – first place	2024 Pinerolo	Ice dance
Gold medal – first place	2025 Varese	Ice dance
Gold medal – first place	2026 Begamo	Ice dance
Silver medal – second place	2011 Milan	Ice dance
Silver medal – second place	2012 Courmayeur	Ice dance
Silver medal – second place	2013 Milan	Ice dance
Silver medal – second place	2014 Merano	Ice dance
Silver medal – second place	2015 Turin	Ice dance
Silver medal – second place	2016 Turin	Ice dance
Silver medal – second place	2017 Egna	Ice dance
Silver medal – second place	2018 Milan	Ice dance
World Team Trophy
Bronze medal – third place	2025 Tokyo	Team

Charlène Edith Magali Guignard (French: [ʃaʁlɛn ɡiɲaʁ]; born 12 August 1989) is a French-Italian ice dancer. Competing for Italy with Marco Fabbri, she is the 2026 Olympic Games team event bronze medalist, a two-time World medalist, a six-time European medalist (including three gold), a four-time Grand Prix Final medalist, a 13-time Grand Prix medalist, and eight-time Italian national champion (2019–26). The two are also eight-time Lombardia Trophy champions, two-time Golden Spin of Zagreb champions, and eight-time Italian national silver medalists. They represented Italy at the 2014, 2018, 2022 and 2026 Winter Olympics.

Guignard previously skated for France, appearing at two World Junior Championships with Guillaume Paulmier.

== Personal life ==
Guignard was born on 12 August 1989 in Brest, France. She became an Italian citizen in August 2013. She and Fabbri have been in a relationship since 2009.

== Career ==
=== Early career ===
Guignard began learning to skate in 1993. Early in her career, she competed for France. Following partnerships with Christopher Guignard and Goulven Fourdan, she teamed up with Guillaume Paulmier. The two debuted on the ISU Junior Grand Prix series in the 2006–07 season. They finished eighteenth at the 2008 World Junior Championships and nineteenth in 2009.

=== 2010–11 season: Debut of Guignard/Fabbri ===
Guignard and Italy's Marco Fabbri began competing together for Italy in the 2010–11 season, coached by Barbara Fusar-Poli. They finished fourth in their international debut, at the 2010 NRW Trophy, before winning the bronze medal at the 2010 Golden Spin of Zagreb. The duo took the silver medal at the Italian Championships. In April 2011, they were sent to their first ISU Championship – the 2011 World Championships in Moscow, Russia. They qualified for the free dance and finished nineteenth overall.

=== 2011–12 season ===
In the 2011–12 season, Guignard/Fabbri repeated as the Italian national silver medalists and placed eleventh at their first European Championships in Sheffield, England.

=== 2012–13 season: Grand Prix debut ===
In 2012–13, Guignard/Fabbri debuted on the Grand Prix series, placing fifth at the 2012 Cup of China. Ranked eighth in both segments, they finished ninth at the 2013 European Championships in Zagreb, Croatia. At the 2013 World Championships in London, Ontario, Canada, they were sixteenth in the short dance, fifteenth in the free dance, and seventeenth overall.

=== 2013–14 season: Sochi Olympics ===
Guignard/Fabbri began the 2013–14 season with a silver medal at the 2013 Ondrej Nepela Trophy and then placed seventh at their sole Grand Prix event, the 2013 Skate Canada International. They were awarded gold at the 2013 NRW Trophy before winning their fourth consecutive national silver medal. In January 2014, they finished eighth at the European Championships in Budapest, Hungary. In February, Guignard/Fabbri represented Italy at the 2014 Winter Olympics in Sochi, Russia; they placed fifteenth in the short dance, fourteenth in the free, and fourteenth overall. They had the same final result in March at the 2014 World Championships in Saitama, Japan, after placing seventeenth in the short and twelfth in the free dance.

=== 2014–15 season ===
Making their Challenger Series (CS) debut, Guignard/Fabbri won the silver medal at the 2014 Ondrej Nepela Trophy. Having received two Grand Prix invitations, they placed sixth at the 2014 Skate America and fifth at the 2014 Trophée Éric Bompard. They were awarded silver medals in December at the 2014 CS Golden Spin of Zagreb and Italian Championships. The two finished sixth at the 2015 European Championships in Stockholm, Sweden, and twelfth at the 2015 World Championships in Shanghai, China.

=== 2015–16 season ===
Guignard/Fabbri placed fourth at both of their 2015–16 Grand Prix events, the 2015 Skate Canada International and 2015 Rostelecom Cup. Turning to the Challenger Series, they won gold medals at the 2015 Warsaw Cup and 2015 Golden Spin of Zagreb.

Again the silver medalists at Italian nationals, Guignard/Fabbri were seventh at the European Championships and tenth at the World Championships.

=== 2016–17 season ===
Guignard/Fabbri defended their title at the 2016 CS Golden Spin of Zagreb and also won the 2016 CS Lombardia Trophy. They placed fourth at both of their events on the 2016–17 Grand Prix and won their seventh silver medal at the Italian Championships. They placed sixth at the 2017 European Championships, and eleventh at the 2017 World Championships.

=== 2017–18 season: Pyeongchang Olympics ===
The duo began the season with their second straight victory at Lombardia, as well as a silver medal at the 2017 CS Golden Spin of Zagreb. They placed fifth at both of their Grand Prix assignments and won their eighth silver medal at the Italian Championships. The two finished fifth at the 2018 European Championships.

Guignard/Fabbri competed at their second Olympics in Pyeongchang, where they placed tenth. They finished the season at the 2018 World Championships, held in their training location of Milan, and placed ninth. Their result, combined with the fourth-place finish of Anna Cappellini and Luca Lanotte, earned Italy three spots at the following year's world championships.

=== 2018–19 season: European bronze and first national title ===
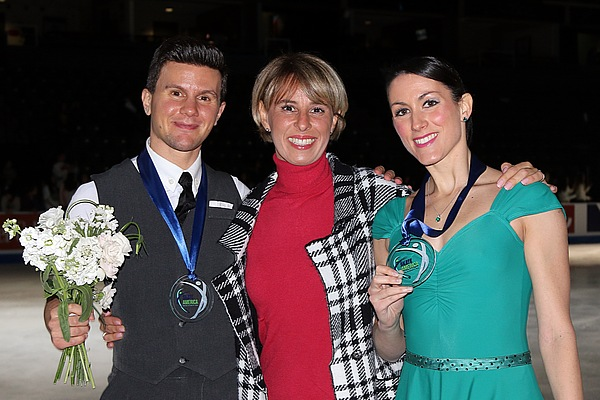
Guignard & Fabbri with longtime coach Barbara Fusar-Poli after winning their first Grand Prix medals at the 2018 Skate America

Beginning the season at the 2018 CS Lombardia Trophy, Guignard/Fabbri won their third straight title. Competing at the 2018 Skate America event, they won the silver medal, the team's first on the Grand Prix. Fabbri remarked that the medal "is a great reward for us. We started from zero when Charléne and I started skating together. I had just started ice dance, and she didn't have international experience. We are proud of what we have achieved." They won silver at their second event, the 2018 Grand Prix of Helsinki, as well, despite a fall in the free dance. These results qualified them for the Grand Prix Final for the first time in their careers. At the Final, they placed second in the rhythm dance and third in the free dance, capturing the bronze medal overall.

Following their Grand Prix success, Guignard/Fabbri won the Italian national title for the first time in their career. At the 2019 European Championships, they placed third in the rhythm dance, behind Papadakis/Cizeron and Stepanova/Bukin. Expected medal contenders Sinitsina/Katsalapov made serious errors that took them effectively out of contention. Guignard/Fabbri were fourth in the free dance, behind Sinitsina/Katsalapov in third, but won the bronze medal overall. Fabbri opined that the free dance had been "our best performance. Scores don't always tell the truth. Sometimes you feel you skated better, but you get less. Sometimes you feel you didn't skate that well and you get more points. This time we felt we skated our best."

Guignard/Fabbri placed eighth at the 2019 World Championships in Saitama and concluded the season as part of Team Italy at the 2019 World Team Trophy.

=== 2019–20 season ===
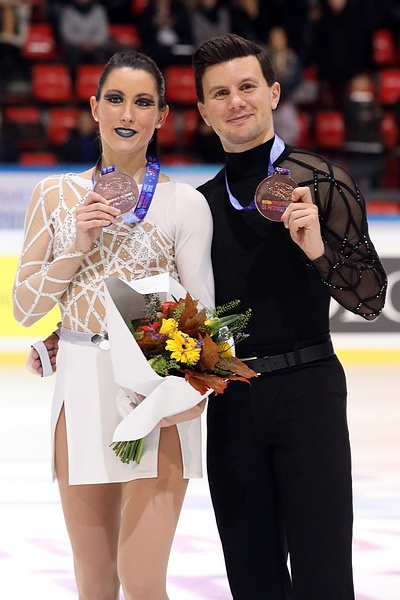
Guignard & Fabbri during the medal ceremony at the 2019 Internationaux de France

Guignard/Fabbri won their fourth consecutive gold medal at the Lombardia Trophy to begin the season. Shortly afterwards, Fabbri injured the tendons in his right hand, and for some time, the team contemplated withdrawing from the Grand Prix as a result. However, a week before the 2019 Internationaux de France, the decision was made to compete. They placed third in the rhythm dance while being the only team to correctly execute all key points on the pattern dance. Third in the free dance as well, Fabbri remarked afterwards, "we didn't think we would have been here until one week ago. We couldn't expect more from this competition." Following the French Grand Prix, Guignard/Fabbri opted to discard their original Paramour-themed rhythm dance in favour of music from Grease. Fabbri attributed the change to a desire for "something more understandable for the audience as well because the old program had unrecognizable music." They were third in the rhythm dance. They placed fourth in the free dance after Guignard fell on a lift exit, winning their second bronze medal of the Grand Prix season. Fabbri said they had not had as much time to practice the rhythm dance while working to change it.

After winning a second national title, Guignard/Fabbri competed at the 2020 European Championships and placed third in the rhythm dance, winning the small bronze medal. They were scheduled to skate last in the free dance, which became a protracted wait following technical issues in assessing the score for the penultimate team Papadakis/Cizeron. Placing fourth in that segment, they dropped to fourth place overall. They had been assigned to compete at the World Championships in Montreal, but these were cancelled as a result of the coronavirus pandemic.

=== 2020–21 season ===
With the coronavirus pandemic affecting international travel, the ISU opted to assign the Grand Prix based primarily on geographic location and Guignard/Fabbri were assigned to the 2020 Internationaux de France. The competition was later cancelled. Instead, Guignard/Fabbri began their season by winning gold at the Third Stage of the Italian Gran Premio, a grand prix competition for Italian skaters hosted by the FISG. A week later, they won their third national title. Guignard/Fabbri then went on to win the Fourth Stage and the Final of the Italian Gran Premio.

Guignard/Fabbri were assigned to compete at the 2021 World Championships, held in a bubble in Stockholm. They placed sixth in both segments and overall and earned a new personal best in the free dance. Because the second Italian dance team, national silver medalists Moscheni/Fioretti, did not make the free dance, Italy only qualified one dance berth at the 2022 Winter Olympics, with the possibility of a second to be qualified later. Guignard/Fabbri finished the season as part of Team Italy at the 2021 World Team Trophy, where they placed second in both segments, earning new personals bests in the free dance and total score, and helping Team Italy to finish in fourth place overall.

=== 2021–22 season: Beijing Olympics ===
Guignard/Fabbri began the season winning the fifth consecutive gold medal at the Lombardia Trophy. On the Grand Prix, they won the silver medal at their first event, 2021 Skate Canada International. Guignard cited jet lag as having hindered their performance somewhat but said, "the crowd was really nice, and it was nice to finally perform in front of people." They won their second Grand Prix silver of the season at 2021 Rostelecom Cup. The results qualified them for the Grand Prix Final, to be held in Osaka, but it was subsequently cancelled due to restrictions prompted by the Omicron variant.

At the Italian championships in Turin, Guignard/Fabbri won their fourth consecutive national title. They were thereafter named to their third Italian Olympic team. At the 2022 European Championships in Tallinn, Guignard/Fabbri won their second bronze medal, despite their longtime coach Barbara Fusar-Poli being unable to participate due to testing positive for COVID-19. Fabbri said it had been "mentally and physically difficult" to compete, as this had been their first event without her in twelve years.

Guignard/Fabbri began the 2022 Winter Olympics as the Italian entries in the rhythm dance segment of the Olympic team event. They placed third in the segment, narrowly prevailing over Canadians Gilles/Poirier, securing eight points for Italy and the highest placement for their team in any segment. Despite their strong performance, Team Italy overall was unable to advance to the second stage of the competition and finished seventh. Competing next in the dance event, they were seventh in the rhythm dance. Guignard/Fabbri placed fifth in the free dance, capitalizing on errors by Gilles/Poirier and Russians Stepanova/Bukin, and moved up to fifth place overall. Thinking on the future, Fabbri mused, "having an Olympic Games in Milan, Italy, which is my home town, and where Charlène has been living for more than ten years, is inviting. It will be something that will push us and make us reflect a lot more."

Guignard and Fabbri finished the season at the 2022 World Championships in Montpellier. The event was held without Russian dance teams being present due to the International Skating Union banning all Russian athletes due to their country's invasion of Ukraine. Guignard/Fabbri placed fourth in the rhythm dance, again ahead of Gilles/Poirier, but several points back of the top three. Fourth in the free dance as well, they finished fourth overall, with a personal best total score of 209.92. Fabbri indicated that they planned to continue the following season.

=== 2022–23 season: World silver and European champions ===
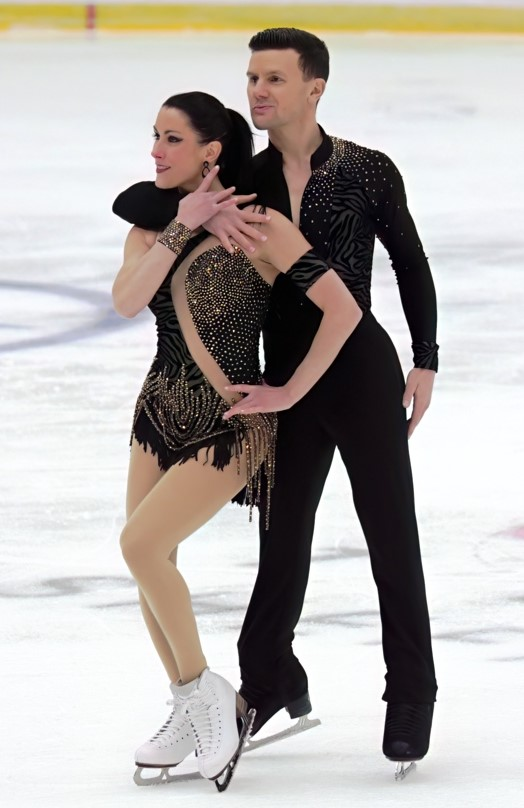
Guignard/Fabbri during their rhythm dance at the 2022 MK John Wilson Trophy

Guignard and Fabbri entered the new Olympic cycle perceived as one of the discipline's top teams, with Russian dance teams continuing to be banned. Once again beginning the season at the Lombardia Trophy, they won another gold medal, setting a new personal best in the rhythm dance in the process.

Entering their first Grand Prix assignment, the 2022 Grand Prix de France, as the title favourites, they won both segments to take the gold medal, their first Grand Prix title. Fabbri described this milestone as a "really emotional moment" and said it was fitting that it happened in Guignard's birth country of France. They were also assigned to compete the following week at the 2022 MK John Wilson Trophy, held in lieu of the traditional Cup of China, the latter having been cancelled due to China's pandemic restrictions. Guignard and Fabbri mistakenly drove to Birmingham rather than the event's actual location in Sheffield initially, but nevertheless arrived in time and won the rhythm dance over home favourites Fear/Gibson. They won the free dance as well with a new personal best score, setting a new best for total score as well, taking their second Grand Prix gold and qualifying for the Grand Prix Final for the third time.

Guignard and Fabbri entered the Grand Prix Final as the second-ranked team behind Canadian champions Gilles/Poirier, with the event occurring on home ice in Turin. They placed third in the rhythm dance behind Gilles/Poirier and pre-season favourites Chock/Bates, who had heretofore struggled. Despite making revisions to their music and choreography before the event in the hopes of improving their scores, they recorded lower marks in the segment than previously. They were third in the free dance as well, notably losing levels on some normally reliable elements like their dance spin and winning their second Final bronze medal. Fabbri remarked that "our performance wasn't perfect; we were feeling hard on our legs. However, we are pretty satisfied with our performance, just a little disappointed about the score. Honestly, this is one of the lowest scores we ever had."

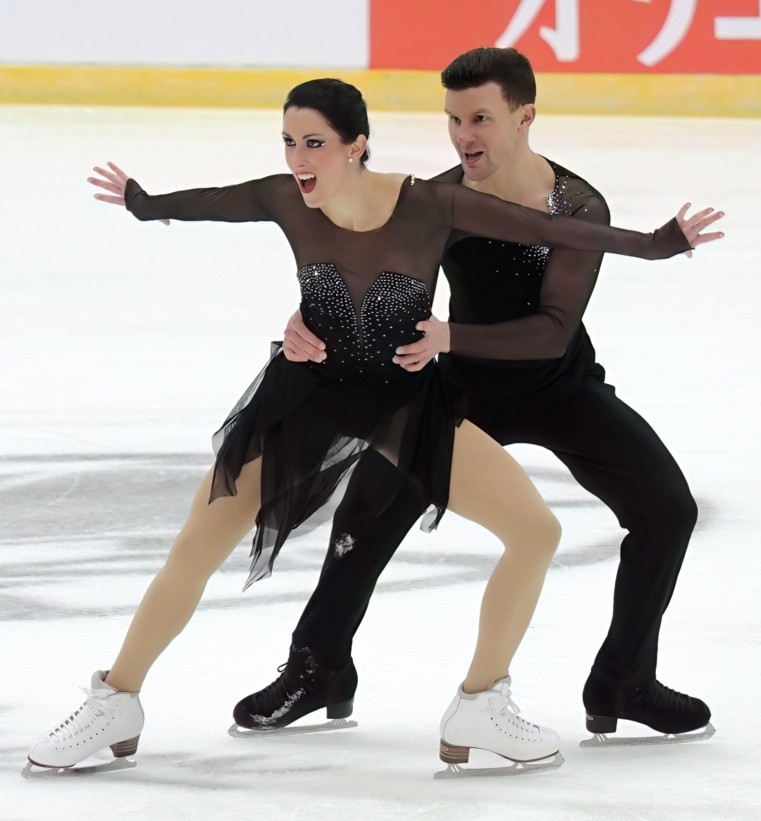
Guignard and Fabbri during their free dance at the 2022 MK John Wilson Trophy

Entering the 2023 European Championships as the title favourites, Guignard/Fabbri won the rhythm dance over Britons Fear/Gibson by a margin of 1.11 points. Guignard expressed disappointment that changes made to their rotational lift had not resulted in better scores, as they felt it was more musical. They won the free dance as well, despite what Fabri called "some little mistakes," such as Guignard losing a twizzle level. They won the European title for the first time, also the first time for an Italian team since 2014. He called it "the work of a lifetime."

At the 2023 World Championships in Saitama, Guignard/Fabbri were considered favourites for the podium along with Chock/Bates and Gilles/Poirier, the latter having missed much of the season after Gilles needed an appendectomy. Guignard/Fabbri placed second in the rhythm dance with a new personal best score of 88.21, more than three points behind segment leaders Chock/Bates and slightly less than a point ahead of Gilles/Poirier in third. Fabbri called the result "fabulous," noting that they had had time in advance of the championships to discuss improvements to the program. Despite Fabbri having a twizzle problem in the free dance, the team finished second in that segment as well, with another personal best, and won the silver medal, their first World medal and the first for an Italian team since 2014. Fabbri said afterward that this was "an incredible reward for many years of hard work, difficult moments, up and downs. We skated with our heart today. I still can't believe we got the silver medal." With Chock/Bates and Gilles/Poirier joining them on the podium, it was the first World Championships ice dance event where all medalists were aged 30 or older.

Guignard/Fabbri finished the season at the World Team Trophy, with Fabbri serving as the captain of Team Italy. They finished second in the rhythm dance, clearing the 90-point mark for the first time. They were second in the free dance as well, setting another personal best. Team Italy finished in fourth place overall.

=== 2023–24 season: World bronze and second European title ===
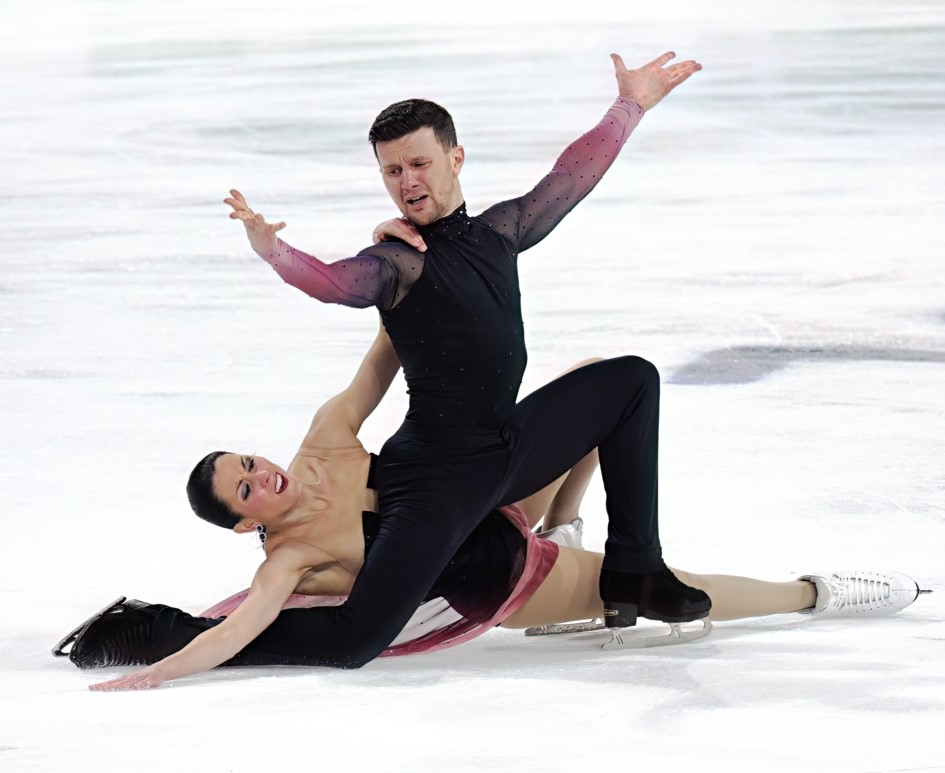
Guignard/Fabbri performing their free dance at the 2023 Grand Prix de France

Guignard/Fabbri began the season at the 2023 CS Lombardia Trophy, taking their seventh gold medal at the event, before winning another gold at the Shanghai Trophy.

Returning to the Grand Prix de France to start the Grand Prix, they successfully defended their title with decisive wins in both segments of the competition. The podium of gold medalists Guignard/Fabbri, silver medalists Fournier Beaudry/Sørensen, and bronze medalists Lopareva/Brissaud was the same as the previous year. Guignard/Fabbri entered the 2023 NHK Trophy as the favourites, but were unexpectedly upset in the free dance by European silver medalists Fear/Gibson of Great Britain. Fabbri called the result "an exciting preview" of the next year's European Championships.

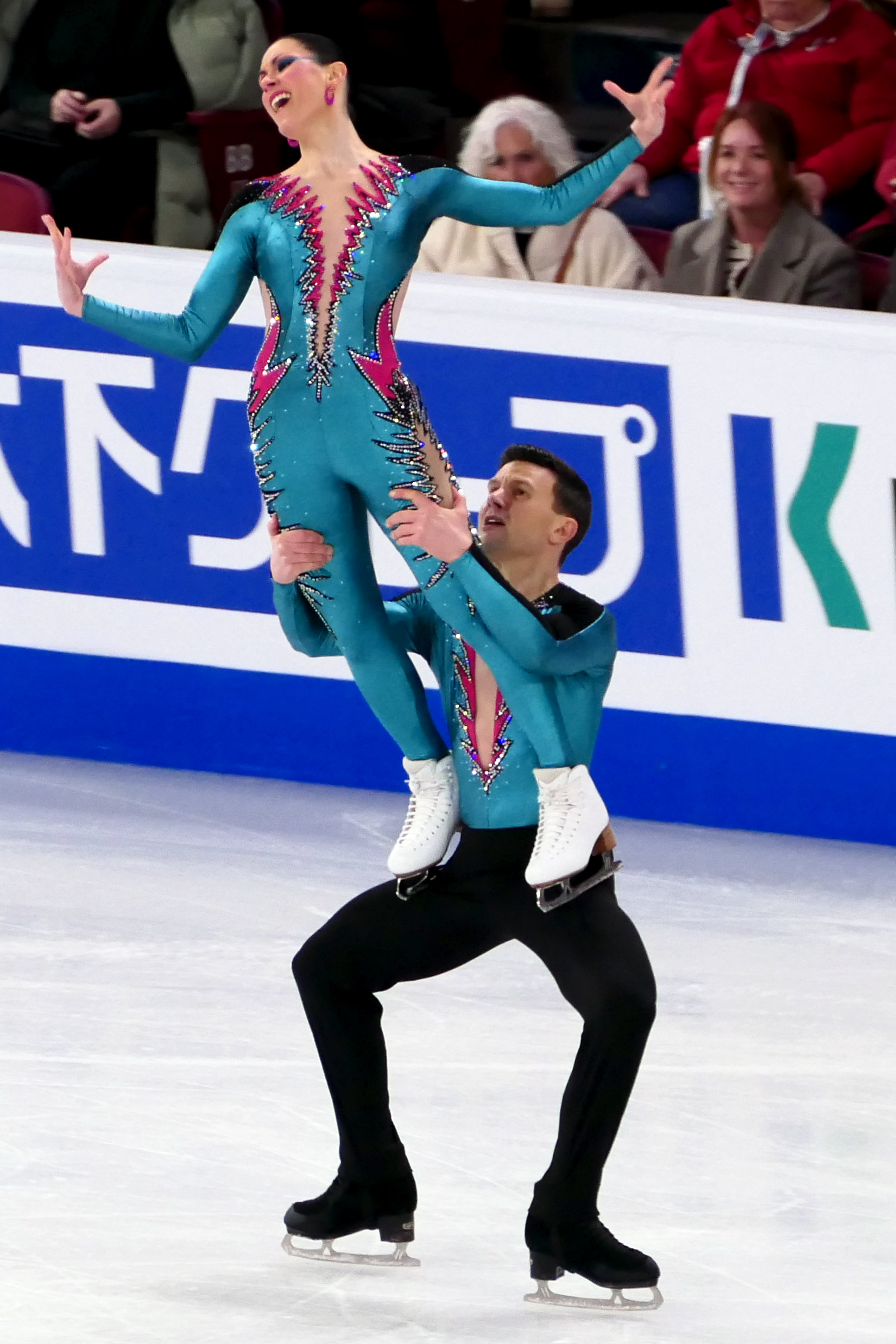
Guignard and Fabbri performing a lift during their rhythm dance at the 2024 World Championships

Guignard/Fabbri rebounded from the underwhelming NHK Trophy result with their performance at the Grand Prix Final, where they finished second in both segments of the competition and took the silver medal. Fabbri said they were "glad to add another colour to our collection."

After retaining the Italian national title, Guignard/Fabbri sought to defend their continental title at the 2024 European Championships in Kaunas. Winning both segments of the competition, they took their second consecutive European gold medal.

Guignard/Fabbri finished the season at the 2024 World Championships in Montreal, where they came second in the rhythm dance with a score of 87.52, 1.01 points ahead of Canada's Gilles/Poirier in third, which Fabbri called "a great score to finish the season." In the free dance, they encountered difficulty when Guignard's skirt became stuck on her skate blade while completing a sliding movement, though they were able to complete the remainder of the program without error. They came third in the segment, and were overtaken by Gilles/Poirier for the silver medal overall, taking bronze.

=== 2024–25 season: Third European title ===
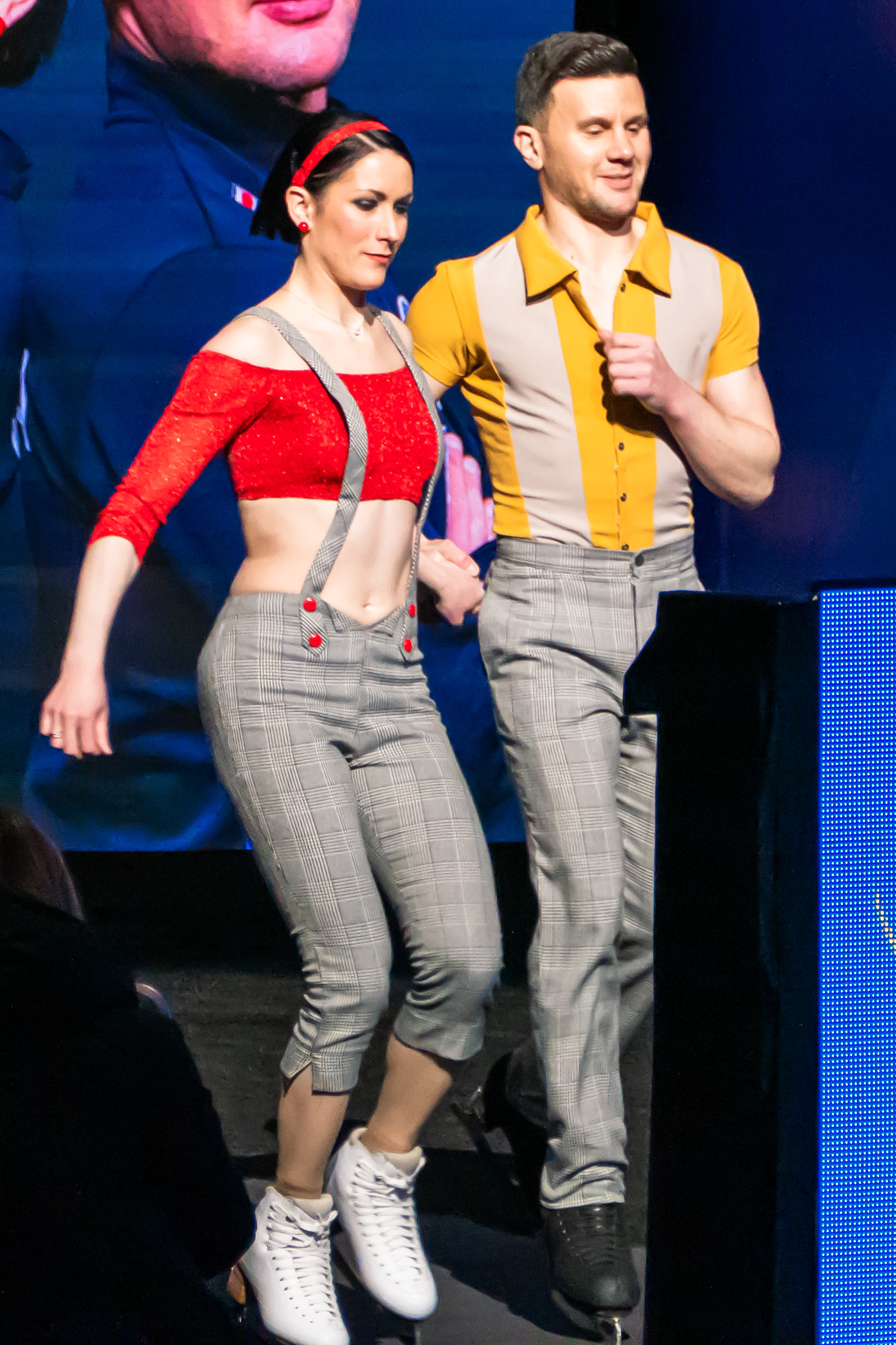
Guignard/Fabbri before their rhythm dance at the 2025 World Championships

In an appearance on the Challenger circuit to begin the season, Guignard/Fabbri won gold at the 2024 CS Lombardia Trophy, and also at the 2024 Shanghai Trophy. Going on to compete at the 2024–25 Grand Prix circuit, Guignard/Fabbri entered the 2024 Grand Prix de France as heavy favourites, and won the rhythm dance segment. After an error-riddled free dance that included Fabbri falling during their circular step sequence, and a lost level on their final stationary lift, they came fifth in that segment, and fell to second overall behind French team Lopareva/Brissaud. Following the event, Fabbri expressed their disappointment, saying, "I have really nothing to say. I think it was the worst performance of our career." Three weeks later, Guignard/Fabbri won the gold medal at the 2024 Cup of China, solidifying their spot at the 2024–25 Grand Prix Final. Fabbri called this "a restart for us, giving us some much-needed good vibes for the rest of the season."

At the Grand Prix Final in Grenoble, Guignard/Fabbri came second in the rhythm dance, aided by a fall from Canadian rivals Gilles/Poirier, who came last in the segment. They were third in the free dance, with Gilles/Poirier rebounding to finish second there, but Guignard/Fabbri remained second overall, while British team Fear/Gibson reached the Final podium as bronze medalists. Guignard and Fabbri said they were "satisfied" with their result, saying that due to their poor result in the French Grand Prix the first part of the season had been both mentally and physically tough. Later in December they won another Italian national title.

In the leadup to the 2025 European Championships in Tallinn, there was speculation as to whether Fear/Gibson, the silver medalists the prior two years, could build on their Grand Prix Final success and mount a challenge to Guignard/Fabbri for the gold medal. However, Guignard/Fabbri won both segments of the competition to take their third consecutive European title, while the British finished third, with Lopareva/Brissaud the silver medalists.

Guignard/Fabbri had twizzle issues in the rhythm dance at the 2025 World Championships in Boston, coming fourth in the segment, 0.82 points behind Fear/Gibson in third. They were fourth as well in the free dance, despite having the third-highest component scores, having lost a level on one of their lifts. Guignard said afterward that their "preparations and training went really well, so I really don't know what happened." She also acknowledged that many "just didn't like" their free program for the season.

Selected to compete for Team Italy at the 2025 World Team Trophy, Guignard/Fabbri placed third in all segments of the ice dance event, contributing to Italy's bronze medal overall. Team captain Guignard remarked that the second day had been "fantastic" for Italy, as it was the first time the team had held third place at the end of the day, and added that the crowd's support had been especially valuable at the final competition of a long season.

=== 2025–26 season: Milano Cortina Olympic team bronze and European silver ===
Guignard/Fabbri started their season off at 2025 Grand Prix de France where they finished fourth. Three weeks later, they won the silver medal at 2025 NHK Trophy. "Since we decided to start the season a little bit later, we are quite happy with the performances we had in both our Grand Prixes," Fabbri said. "We know that's just the beginning of the season for us."

In December, following a gold medal win at the 2025 CS Golden Spin of Zagreb, Guignard and Fabbri competed at the 2026 Italian Championships, winning their eighth consecutive national title. They were subsequently named to the 2026 Winter Olympic team.

The following month, Guignard/Fabbri won the silver medal at the 2026 European Championships. "We knew that we were not in perfect shape at the beginning of the season,” said Fabbri. “So, getting back from that and going home now with these performances, we’re really proud.”

On 6 February, Guignard/Fabbri performed their Rhythm Dance at the 2026 Winter Olympics Figure Skating Team Event, for fifth place. “We are pleased with our performance,” said Fabbri. “To be honest, at this point of the career, it’s the most important thing you should look at. If you just check the scores all the time and you feel disappointed by the scores, then it’s better to stop." The following day, they placed second in the Free Dance, helping to propel Team Italy up the standings to an eventual bronze medal. "Today was a big day, we’re happy, proud, and relieved, but also tired," said Fabbri. "There were a lot of mixed emotions. It wasn’t an easy day because, in figure skating, you never know what can happen.”

Four days later, Guignard/Fabbri finished fourth at the individual ice dance event after placing fifth in the rhythm dance and fourth in the free dance. "Going home with a third place in the team event and a fourth place in the individual event—at the beginning of our career, we would never have dreamed of that," said Fabbri. "This medal was the last thing missing in our collection. Now we have it."

== Programs ==
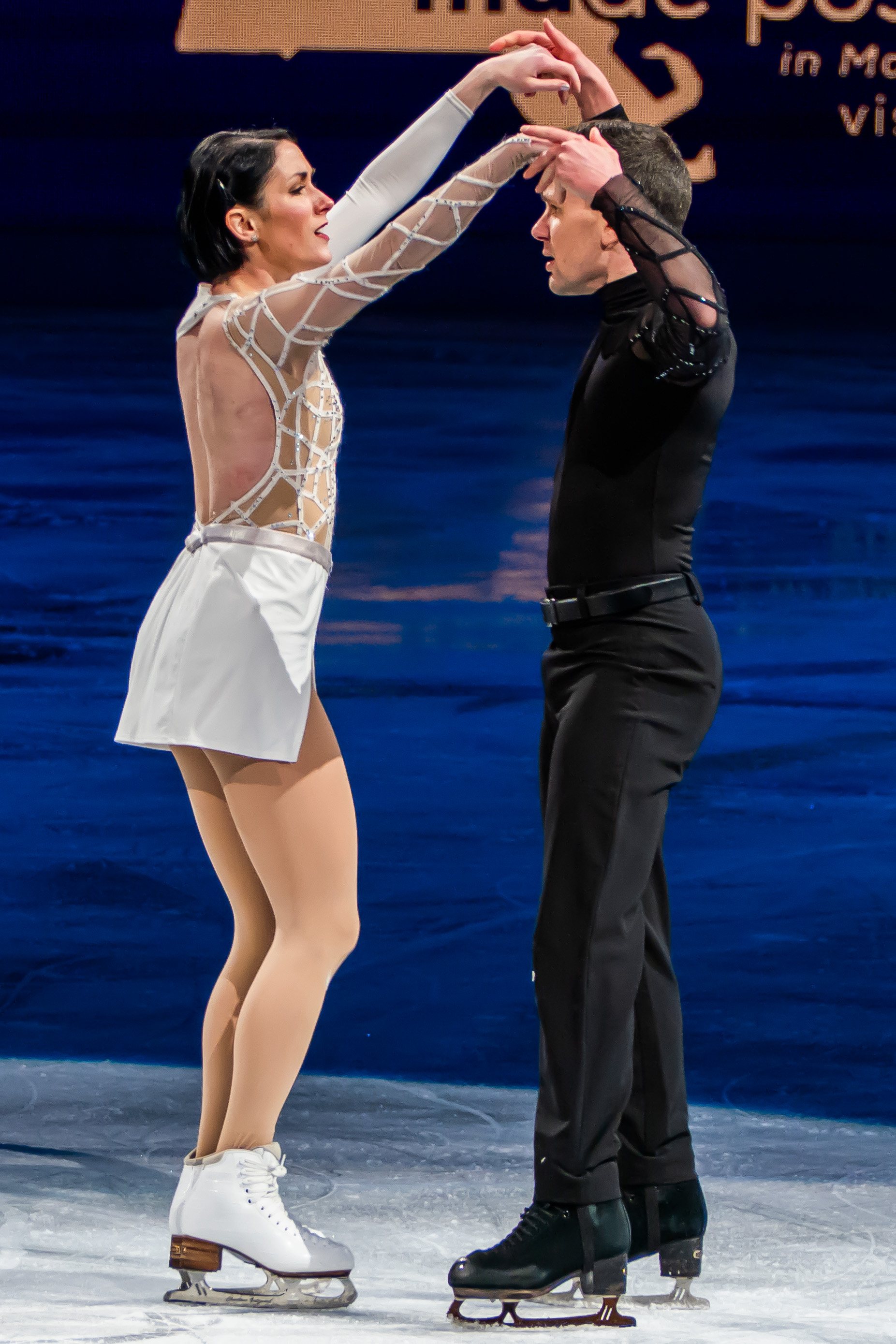
Guignard/Fabbri during the gala at the 2025 World Championships

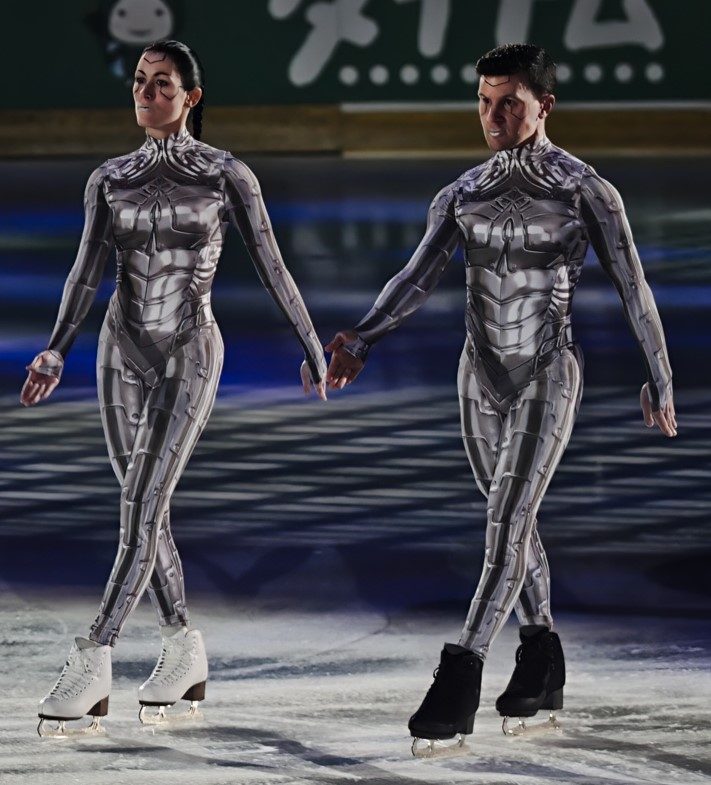
Guignard and Fabbri during the gala at the 2023 Grand Prix de France

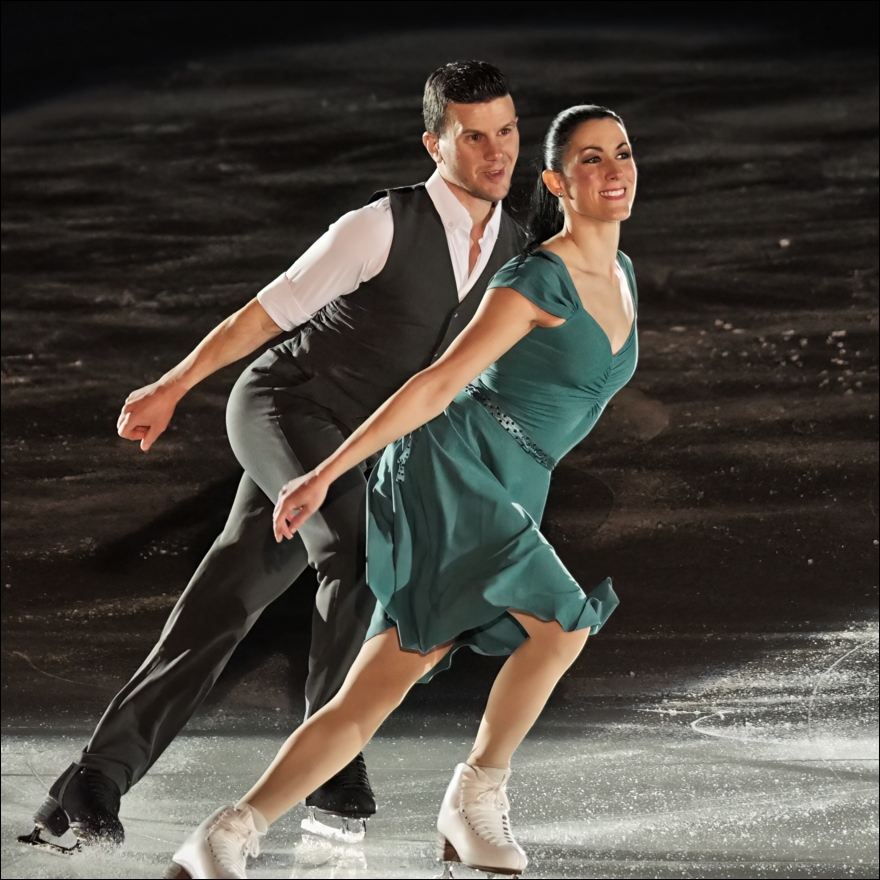
Guignard/Fabbri during the gala at the 2022 MK John Wilson Trophy

=== Ice dance with Marco Fabbri (for Italy) ===
Season	Short dance/Rhythm dance	Free dance	Exhibition	Ref.
2010–11	Mine Vaganti; "Assassin's Tango" (from Mr. & Mrs. Smith) By John Powell Choreo. by Lyudmila Vlasova	"March With Me" Performed by Montserrat Caballé Choreo. by Lyudmila Vlasova	—N/a	
2011–12	Cha-Cha: "Cuentame" By The Manhattan Transfer; Rhumba: "All Is Fair In Love" By Stevie Wonder; Samba: "Comadre Compadre" By King Africa Choreo. by Barbara Fusar-Poli & Lyudmila Vlasova	The Godfather By Nino Rota Choreo. by Barbara Fusar-Poli & Lyudmila Vlasova	—N/a	
2012–13	Waltz: "Buongiorno A Te" Performed by Luciano Pavarotti; Polka: "Tritsch Tratsch Polka" By Johann Strauss II Choreo. by Barbara Fusar-Poli & Corrado Giordani	Estate; Inverno (from The Four Seasons) By Antonio Vivaldi Choreo. by Barbara Fusar-Poli & Corrado Giordani	"Let's Get Loud" By Jennifer Lopez	
2013–14	Charleston: "Money, Money" (from Cabaret); Quickstep: "Cabaret" By Liza Minnelli; Foxtrot: "Big Spender" (from Fosse) Choreo. by Barbara Fusar-Poli & Corrado Giordani	"Un giorno per noi" (from Romeo and Juliet) Performed by Josh Groban; "Dance of the Knights" (from Romeo and Juliet) By Sergei Prokofiev Choreo. by Barbara Fusar-Poli & Corrado Giordani	—N/a	
2014–15	Flamenco: "Farrucas" By Jose Galvan; Paso doble: "Gato Montes" By Hugo Montenegro Choreo. by Barbara Fusar-Poli & Corrado Giordani	"Lord of the Dance" By Ronan Hardiman; "Reel Around the Sun" By Bill Whelan; "Nocturne" By Secret Garden; "Warriors" By Ronan Hardiman Choreo. by Barbara Fusar-Poli & Corrado Giordani	"Forgotten" By Elvis Costello	
2015–16	Waltz: "Torna a Surriento" Performed by Luciano Pavarotti; Polka: "Maria Mari" Performed by André Rieu; "Fantasia Italiana" By Mantovani Choreo. by Barbara Fusar-Poli & Corrado Giordani	Schindler's List By John Williams; "Abdication" (from W.E.) By Abel Korzeniowski Choreo. by Barbara Fusar-Poli & Corrado Giordani	"Canto della Terra" By Andrea Bocelli & Sarah Brightman	
2016–17	Grease; Blues: "There Are Worse Things I Could Do"; Swing: "Greased Lightnin'" Choreo. by Barbara Fusar-Poli & Corrado Giordani	The Nutcracker By Pyotr Ilyich Tchaikovsky; "Pas de deux"; "Waltz of the Flowers" Choreo. by Barbara Fusar-Poli & Corrado Giordani	La Bohème By Charles Aznavour	
2017–18	Salsa: "La Tormenta" Performed by Sergio George's Salsa Giants; Rhumba: "Con Los Anos Que Me Quedan" By Gloria Estefan; Samba: "Samba de Rio Pardo" By Miguel Preto Choreo. by Barbara Fusar-Poli & Corrado Giordani	"Exogenesis: Symphony", Part III By Muse Choreo. by Barbara Fusar-Poli & Corrado Giordani	Cello: Lamberto Curtoni; "Hallelujah" By Leonard Cohen Performed by Jeff Buckley	
2018–19	Tango: "Miedo a la Libertad" By Tanghetto; Tango: "La Chanson des vieux amants" Performed by Kantango; Tango: "Tanos" By Lino Cannavacciuvolo Choreo. by Barbara Fusar-Poli & Corrado Giordani	"Audition (The Fools Who Dream)" Performed by Emma Stone; "Lovely Night"; "Planetarium" (from La La Land) By Justin Hurwitz, Benj Pasek & Justin Paul Choreo. by Barbara Fusar-Poli & Corrado Giordani	Grease: "Hopelessly Devoted to You" Performed by Olivia Newton-John; "You're the One That I Want" Performed by John Travolta & Olivia Newton-John	
2019–20	Blues: "AJ's Blues"; Quickstep: "The Hollywood Wiz" Performed by Jeremy Kushnier; Quickstep: "Reel Love" Performed by Jeremy Kushnier, Ryan Vona & Ruby Lewis (from Paramour) By Guy Dubuc & Marc Lessard Choreo. by Barbara Fusar-Poli & Corrado Giordani	"Space Oddity" By David Bowie Performed by Amanda Palmer & Jherez Bischoff; "Life on Mars?" By David Bowie Performed by Lukas Nelson & Promise of the Real Choreo. by Barbara Fusar-Poli & Corrado Giordani	"Mad World" By Tears for Fears Performed by Adam Lambert	
2019–20	Grease: Blues: "Hopelessly Devoted to You" By John Farrar Performed by Grease Live! cast; Rock: "Greased Lightnin'" By Jim Jacobs & Warren Casey Performed by Glee cast; Swing: "We Go Together" By Jim Jacobs & Warren Casey Performed by Grease Live! cast Choreo. by Barbara Fusar-Poli & Corrado Giordani	"Space Oddity" By David Bowie Performed by Amanda Palmer & Jherez Bischoff; "Life on Mars?" By David Bowie Performed by Lukas Nelson & Promise of the Real Choreo. by Barbara Fusar-Poli & Corrado Giordani	"Mad World" By Tears for Fears Performed by Adam Lambert	
2020–2021	Grease: Blues: "Hopelessly Devoted to You" By John Farrar Performed by Grease Live! cast; Rock: "Greased Lightnin'" By Jim Jacobs & Warren Casey Performed by Glee cast; Swing: "We Go Together" By Jim Jacobs & Warren Casey Performed by Grease Live! cast Choreo. by Barbara Fusar-Poli & Corrado Giordani	Atonement By Dario Marianelli; "Song For The Little Sparrow" By Abel Korzeniowski Choreo. by Barbara Fusar-Poli & Corrado Giordani	7+3 By Ultimo	
2021–22	Funk: "Diamonds Are Invincible" By Michael Jackson & Mark Ronson; Hip-Hop: "Smooth Criminal"; Disco: "Don't Stop 'Til You Get Enough" By Michael Jackson Choreo. by Barbara Fusar-Poli & Corrado Giordani	Atonement By Dario Marianelli; "Song For The Little Sparrow" By Abel Korzeniowski Choreo. by Barbara Fusar-Poli & Corrado Giordani	7+3 By Ultimo	
2022–23	Samba: "This Is"; Rhumba: "I'm Crying (Mother's Tears)" By Grace Jones; Samba: "Pantera en Libertad (Apollo 440 Remix)" By Mónica Naranjo & Apollo 440 Choreo. by Barbara Fusar-Poli & Corrado Giordani	"My Love Will Never Die" By AG, feat. Claire Wyndham; "Mephisto's Lullaby" By Yair Albeg Wein & Or Kribos; "Eden" By Belinda Choreo. by Barbara Fusar-Poli & Corrado Giordani	"A Lovely Night" (from La La Land) By Emma Stone & Ryan Gosling	
2022–23	Samba: "This Is"; Rhumba: "I'm Crying (Mother's Tears)" By Grace Jones; Samba: "Pantera en Libertad (Apollo 440 Remix)" By Mónica Naranjo & Apollo 440 Choreo. by Barbara Fusar-Poli & Corrado Giordani	"My Love Will Never Die" By AG, feat. Claire Wyndham; "Mephisto's Lullaby" By Yair Albeg Wein & Or Kribos; "Eden" By Belinda Choreo. by Barbara Fusar-Poli & Corrado Giordani	"Brividi" By Mahmood & Blanco	
2023–24	"Holding Out for a Hero" By Bonnie Tyler; "Against All Odds" By Phil Collins Choreo. by Barbara Fusar-Poli & Corrado Giordani	"Through the Sheets" (from Emily) By Abel Korzeniowski; "Arrival of the Birds" (from The Crimson Wing: Mystery of the Flamingos) By The Cinematic Orchestra; "A Model of the Universe" (from The Theory of Everything) By Jóhann Jóhannsson; "Closing Credits" (from The Dressmaker) By David Hirschfelder Choreo. by Barbara Fusar-Poli & Corrado Giordani	7+3	
2023–24	"Holding Out for a Hero" By Bonnie Tyler; "Against All Odds" By Phil Collins Choreo. by Barbara Fusar-Poli & Corrado Giordani	"Through the Sheets" (from Emily) By Abel Korzeniowski; "Arrival of the Birds" (from The Crimson Wing: Mystery of the Flamingos) By The Cinematic Orchestra; "A Model of the Universe" (from The Theory of Everything) By Jóhann Jóhannsson; "Closing Credits" (from The Dressmaker) By David Hirschfelder Choreo. by Barbara Fusar-Poli & Corrado Giordani	"Robotboys Audition" By Robotboys; "Careless Whisper" By George Michael; "Pump It" By Black Eyed Peas	
2024–25	"Land of a Thousand Dances" By Wilson Pickett; "For Once in My Life" By Stevie Wonder; "You Make Me Feel (Mighty Real) (Kevin McKay Remix)" Performed by Byron Stingily & Kevin McKay Choreo. by Barbara Fusar-Poli & Corrado Giordani	"Robotboys Audition" By Robotboys; "Goodbye" By Kavinsky & Sébastien Tellier; "DubstEpic Symph" By Robotboys Choreo. by Barbara Fusar-Poli & Corrado Giordani	"Un'altra storia" By Marco Mengoni, feat. Franco126	
2025–26	"Everybody (Backstreet's Back)"; "Show Me the Meaning of Being Lonely" By Backstreet Boys Choreo. by Corrado Giordani	Diamanti; "Gioco di Sguardi"; "Diamanti Theme (Intimate)"; "Diamanti Theme (Extended)" By Giuliano Taviani & Carmelo Molinar; "Diamanti" Performed by Giorgia Choreo. by Corrado Giordani	Perfect Symphony By Ed Sheeran & Andrea Bocelli; La cura per me By Giorgia	

=== With Paulmier ===
Season	Original dance	Free dance
2007–2008	American country dance: Stand By Your Men by Dixie Chicks; Rodeo Girls	Zombie by Dolores O'Riordan; Belphegor by Bruno Coulais
2008–2009	Boogie Woogie Bugle Boy; Moonlight Serenade by Glenn Miller	Bharati

== Competitive highlights ==
- GP – Event of the ISU Grand Prix Series
- CS – Event of the ISU Challenger Series
- C – Event was cancelled
- TBD – Assigned
- WD – Withdrew from competition
- Medals at team events are awarded for the team results only. Individual placements at team events are listed in parentheses.

=== Ice dance with Marco Fabbri (for Italy) ===
==== 2018–19 to present ====
Competition placements at senior level
Season	2018–19	2019–20	2020–21	2021–22	2022–23	2023–24	2024–25	2025–26
Winter Olympics				5th				4th
Winter Olympics (Team event)				7th (3rd)				3rd
World Championships	8th	C	6th	4th	2nd	3rd	4th	
European Championships	3rd	4th	C	3rd	1st	1st	1st	2nd
Grand Prix Final	3rd			C	3rd	2nd	2nd	
Italian Championships	1st	1st	1st	1st	1st	1st	1st	1st
World Team Trophy	6th (5th)		4th (2nd)		4th (2nd)		3rd (3rd)	
GP Cup of China							1st	
GP Finland	2nd							
GP France		3rd			1st	1st	2nd	4th
GP NHK Trophy		3rd				2nd		2nd
GP Rostelecom Cup				2nd				
GP Skate America	2nd							
GP Skate Canada				2nd				
GP Wilson Trophy					1st			
CS Alpen Trophy	1st							
CS Cup of Austria				1st				
CS Golden Spin of Zagreb		1st						1st
CS Lombardia Trophy	1st	1st		1st	1st	1st	1st	
Shanghai Trophy						1st	1st	

==== 2010–11 to 2017–18 ====
Competition placements at senior level
Season	2010–11	2011–12	2012–13	2013–14	2014–15	2015–16	2016–17	2017–18
Winter Olympics				14th				10th
Winter Olympics (Team event)				4th (4th)				
World Championships	19th		17th	14th	12th	10th	11th	9th
European Championships		11th	9th	8th	6th	7th	6th	5th
Italian Championships	2nd	2nd	2nd	2nd	2nd	2nd	2nd	2nd
GP Cup of China			5th					
GP France					5th			5th
GP Rostelecom Cup						4th	4th	5th
GP Skate America					6th		4th	
GP Skate Canada				7th		4th		
CS Golden Spin of Zagreb	3rd	3rd			2nd	1st	1st	2nd
CS Lombardia Trophy						2nd	1st	1st
CS Nepela Memorial				2nd	2nd			
CS Warsaw Cup						1st		
Bavarian Open		1st						
Finlandia Trophy		4th	4th					
Mont Blanc Trophy	3rd							
New Year's Cup			1st					
NRW Trophy	4th	2nd		1st				
Pavel Roman Memorial			3rd					
Shanghai Trophy								2nd
Trophy of Lyon			1st					
Winter Universiade					1st			

=== Ice dance with Guillaume Paulmier (for France) ===
Competition placements at junior level
Season	2006–07	2007–08	2008–09
World Junior Championships		18th	19th
French Championships			5th S
JGP Bulgaria		9th	
JGP Czech Republic	12th		
JGP France			8th
JGP United States		5th	
Master's de Patinage	5th	3rd	1st
Santa Claus Cup			1st

== Detailed results ==
=== Ice dance with Marco Fabbri (for Italy) ===
ISU personal best scores in the +5/-5 GOE System
Segment	Type	Score	Event
Total	TSS	223.24	2023 World Team Trophy
Rhythm dance	TSS	90.90	2023 World Team Trophy
Rhythm dance	TES	52.94	2023 World Team Trophy
Rhythm dance	PCS	37.96	2023 World Team Trophy
Free dance	TSS	132.34	2023 World Team Trophy
Free dance	TES	74.90	2023 World Team Trophy
Free dance	PCS	57.44	2023 World Team Trophy

ISU personal best scores in the +3/-3 GOE System
Segment	Type	Score	Event
Total	TSS	180.30	2016 CS Golden Spin of Zagreb
Rhythm dance	TSS	72.46	2016 CS Golden Spin of Zagreb
Rhythm dance	TES	38.18	2017 CS Golden Spin of Zagreb
Rhythm dance	PCS	34.36	2016 CS Golden Spin of Zagreb
Free dance	TSS	107.84	2016 CS Golden Spin of Zagreb
Free dance	TES	55.16	2018 World Championships
Free dance	PCS	52.98	2016 CS Golden Spin of Zagreb

Results in the 2009–10 season
Date	Event	RD		FD		Total	
Date	Event	P	Score	P	Score	P	Score
Sep 10–12, 2009	(France) 2009 Master's de Patinage	5	41.51	5	68.52	5	110.03

Results in the 2010–11 season
Date	Event	RD		FD		Total	
Date	Event	P	Score	P	Score	P	Score
Nov 5–7, 2010	(Germany) 2010 NRW Trophy	3	51.74	5	74.47	4	126.21
Dec 9-11, 2010	(Croatia) 2010 Golden Spin of Zagreb	4	49.45	3	74.18	3	123.63
Dec 16–19, 2010	(Italy) 2011 Italian Championships	2	53.86	1	83.54	2	137.40
Feb 15–20, 2011	(Italy) 2011 Mont Blanc Trophy	3	54.90	3	77.73	3	132.63
Apr 25 – May 1, 2011	(Russia) 2011 World Championships	18	49.80	19	70.22	19	120.02

Results in the 2011–12 season
Date	Event	RD		FD		Total	
Date	Event	P	Score	P	Score	P	Score
Oct 6–9, 2011	(Finland) 2011 Finlandia Trophy	4	51.05	4	76.59	4	127.64
Nov 4–6, 2011	(Germany) 2011 NRW Trophy	6	47.31	1	82.64	2	129.95
Dec 8–11, 2011	(Croatia) 2011 Golden Spin of Zagreb	3	54.78	3	81.22	3	136.00
Dec 15–18, 2011	(Italy) 2012 Italian Championships	2	61.51	3	79.55	2	141.06
Jan 23–29, 2012	(United Kingdom) 2012 European Championships	10	52.45	11	77.01	11	129.46
Feb 1–5, 2012	(Germany) 2012 Bavarian Open	1	57.91	2	85.23	1	143.14

Results in the 2012–13 season
Date	Event	RD		FD		Total	
Date	Event	P	Score	P	Score	P	Score
Nov 2–4, 2012	2012 Cup of China	5	55.57	6	82.01	5	1137.58
Nov 16–18, 2012	(Czech Republic) 2012 Pavel Roman Memorial	3	52.79	3	83.54	3	136.33
Dec 19–22, 2012	(Italy) 2013 Italian Championships	2	57.19	2	95.35	2	152.54
Jan 3–6, 2013	(Slovakia) 2013 New Year's Cup	1	62.47	1	86.89	1	149.36
Jan 11–13, 2013	(France) 2013 International Trophy of Lyon	1	61.06	1	89.45	1	150.51
Jan 23–27, 2013	(Croatia) 2013 European Championships	8	57.63	8	84.85	9	142.48
Mar 11–17, 2013	(Canada) 2013 World Championships	16	57.89	15	83.06	17	140.95

Results in the 2013–14 season
Date	Event	RD		FD		Total	
Date	Event	P	Score	P	Score	P	Score
Oct 3–5, 2013	(Slovakia) 2013 Ondrej Nepela Trophy	2	59.14	2	85.13	2	144.27
Oct 24–27, 2013	2013 Skate Canada International	8	52.03	7	82.25	7	134.28
Nov 1–3, 2013	(Germany) 2013 NRW Trophy	1	59.40	1	84.88	1	144.28
Dec 18–21, 2013	(Italy) 2014 Italian Championships	2	62.80	2	94.60	2	157.40
Jan 13–19, 2014	(Hungary) 2014 European Championships	8	58.17	7	86.23	8	144.40
Feb 6–9, 2014	(Russia) 2014 Winter Olympics (Team event)	—N/a	—N/a	4	81.25	4	—N/a
Feb 16–17, 2014	(Russia) 2014 Winter Olympics	15	58.14	14	86.64	14	144.78
Mar 24–30, 2014	(Japan) 2014 World Championships	17	53.98	12	86.79	14	140.77

Results in the 2014–15 season
Date	Event	RD		FD		Total	
Date	Event	P	Score	P	Score	P	Score
Oct 1–5, 2014	(Slovakia) 2014 CS Ondrej Nepela Trophy	2	58.14	2	85.80	2	143.94
Oct 24–26, 2014	(United States) 2014 Skate America	7	54.18	5	81.32	6	135.50
Nov 21–23, 2014	(France) 2014 Trophée Éric Bompard	5	56.57	5	85.72	5	142.29
Dec 4–6, 2014	(Croatia) 2014 CS Golden Spin of Zagreb	1	66.40	2	100.06	2	166.46
Dec 20–21, 2014	(Italy) 2015 Italian Championships	2	66.95	2	102.79	2	169.74
Jan 26 – Feb 1, 2015	(Sweden) 2015 European Championships	7	62.10	5	92.51	6	154.61
Feb 4–8, 2015	(Spain) 2015 Winter Universiade	1	64.44	1	100.54	1	164.98
Mar 23–29, 2015	(China) 2015 World Championships	12	61.02	12	92.82	12	153.84

Results in the 2015–16 season
Date	Event	RD		FD		Total	
Date	Event	P	Score	P	Score	P	Score
Sep 17–20, 2015	(Italy) 2015 Lombardia Trophy	2	64.30	2	93.53	2	157.83
Oct 30 – Nov 1, 2015	2015 Skate Canada International	4	61.29	4	93.45	4	154.74
Nov 20–22, 2015	(Russia) 2015 Rostelecom Cup	4	60.58	5	92.96	4	153.54
Nov 27–29, 2015	(Poland) 2015 CS Warsaw Cup	1	67.44	1	102.28	1	169.72
Dec 2–5, 2015	(Croatia) 2015 CS Golden Spin of Zagreb	1	68.24	1	104.04	1	172.28
Dec 16–19, 2015	(Italy) 2016 Italian Championships	2	69.00	2	105.86	2	174.86
Jan 25–31, 2016	(Slovakia) 2016 European Championships	6	64.87	7	97.71	7	162.58
Mar 28 – Apr 3, 2016	(United States) 2016 World Championships	10	65.96	9	101.95	10	167.91

Results in the 2016–17 season
Date	Event	RD		FD		Total	
Date	Event	P	Score	P	Score	P	Score
Sep 8-11, 2016	(Italy) 2016 CS Lombardia Trophy	1	63.04	1	99.08	1	162.12
Oct 21–23, 2016	(United States) 2016 Skate America	5	64.79	4	100.65	4	165.44
Nov 4–5, 2016	(Russia) 2016 Rostelecom Cup	4	67.72	4	102.73	4	170.45
Dec 7–10, 2016	(Croatia) 2016 CS Golden Spin of Zagreb	1	72.46	1	107.84	1	180.30
Dec 14–17, 2016	(Italy) 2017 Italian Championships	2	72.32	2	110.07	2	182.39
Jan 25–29, 2017	(Czech Republic) 2017 European Championships	4	70.46	7	93.22	6	163.68
Mar 29 – Apr 2, 2017	(Finland) 2017 World Championships	11	67.56	11	98.12	11	165.68

Results in the 2017–18 season
Date	Event	RD		FD		Total	
Date	Event	P	Score	P	Score	P	Score
Sep 14–17, 2017	(Italy) 2017 CS Lombardia Trophy	1	70.26	1	99.04	1	169.30
Oct 20–22, 2017	(Russia) 2017 Rostelecom Cup	5	68.99	5	102.38	5	171.37
Nov 17–19, 2017	2017 Internationaux de France	4	69.73	5	101.28	5	171.01
Nov 24–26, 2017	(China) 2017 Shanghai Trophy	—N/a	—N/a	2	102.96	2	102.96
Dec 6–9, 2017	(Croatia) 2017 CS Golden Spin of Zagreb	2	71.78	2	106.38	2	178.16
Dec 13–16, 2017	(Italy) 2018 Italian Championships	2	76.84	2	113.52	2	190.36
Jan 15–21, 2018	(Russia) 2018 European Championships	5	71.58	4	106.17	5	177.75
Feb 19–20, 2018	(South Korea) 2018 Winter Olympics	11	68.16	9	105.31	10	173.47
Mar 19–25, 2018	(Italy) 2018 World Championships	9	71.15	9	107.29	9	178.44

Results in the 2018–19 season
Date	Event	RD		FD		Total	
Date	Event	P	Score	P	Score	P	Score
Sep 12–16, 2018	(Italy) 2018 CS Lombardia Trophy	1	76.03	1	117.25	1	193.28
Oct 19–21, 2018	(United States) 2018 Skate America	2	75.01	2	117.29	2	192.30
Nov 2–4, 2018	(Finland) 2018 Grand Prix of Helsinki	2	77.36	2	118.93	2	196.29
Nov 11–18, 2018	(Austria) 2018 CS Alpen Trophy	1	76.96	1	118.43	1	195.39
Dec 6–9, 2018	(Canada) 2018–19 Grand Prix Final	2	78.30	3	120.35	3	198.65
Dec 13–16, 2018	(Italy) 2019 Italian Championships	1	82.48	1	123.95	1	206.43
Jan 21–27, 2019	(Belarus) 2019 European Championships	3	79.05	4	120.79	3	199.84
Mar 18–24, 2019	(Japan) 2019 World Championships	7	81.66	8	117.52	8	199.18
Apr 11–14, 2019	(Japan) 2020 World Team Trophy	4	80.25	5	122.29	5	202.54

Results in the 2019–20 season
Date	Event	RD		FD		Total	
Date	Event	P	Score	P	Score	P	Score
Sep 13–15, 2019	(Italy) 2019 CS Lombardia Trophy	1	79.47	1	122.63	1	202.10
Nov 1–3, 2019	2019 Internationaux de France	3	79.65	3	123.69	3	203.34
Nov 22–24, 2019	(Japan) 2019 NHK Trophy	3	82.13	4	115.93	3	198.06
Dec 4–7, 2019	(Croatia) 2019 CS Golden Spin of Zagreb	1	83.31	1	118.87	1	202.18
Dec 12–15, 2019	(Italy) 2020 Italian Championships	1	88.63	1	129.34	1	217.97
Jan 20–26, 2020	(Austria) 2020 European Championships	3	84.66	4	120.92	4	205.58

Results in the 2020–21 season
Date	Event	RD		FD		Total	
Date	Event	P	Score	P	Score	P	Score
Dec 12–13, 2020	(Italy) 2021 Italian Championships	1	90.21	1	134.88	1	225.09
Mar 22–28, 2021	(Sweden) 2021 World Championships	6	81.04	6	124.16	6	205.20
Apr 15–18, 2021	(Japan) 2021 World Team Trophy	2	82.93	2	124.75	4 (2)	207.68

Results in the 2021–22 season
Date	Event	RD		FD		Total	
Date	Event	P	Score	P	Score	P	Score
Sep 10–12, 2021	(Italy) 2021 CS Lombardia Trophy	1	82.05	1	123.31	1	205.36
Oct 29–31, 2021	2021 Skate Canada International	2	78.82	2	121.23	2	200.05
Nov 11–14, 2021	2021 CS Cup of Austria	1	82.78	1	126.10	1	208.88
Nov 26–28, 2021	(Russia) 2021 Rostelecom Cup	2	79.56	2	124.15	2	203.71
Dec 4–5, 2021	(Italy) 2022 Italian Championships	1	89.24	1	132.27	1	221.51
Jan 10–16, 2022	(Estonia) 2022 European Championships	3	83.35	3	124.62	3	207.97
Feb 4–7, 2022	(China) 2022 Winter Olympics – Team event	3	83.83	—N/a	—N/a	7	—N/a
Feb 12–14, 2022	(China) 2022 Winter Olympics	7	82.68	5	124.37	5	207.05
Mar 21–27, 2022	(France) 2022 World Championships	4	84.22	4	125.70	4	209.92

Results in the 2022–23 season
Date	Event	RD		FD		Total	
Date	Event	P	Score	P	Score	P	Score
Sep 16–19, 2022	(Italy) 2022 CS Lombardia Trophy	1	87.09	1	124.76	1	211.85
Nov 4–6, 2022	2022 Grand Prix de France	1	83.52	1	124.43	1	207.95
Nov 11–13, 2022	(United Kingdom) 2022 MK John Wilson Trophy	1	86.30	1	127.44	1	213.74
Dec 8–11, 2022	(Italy) 2022–23 Grand Prix Final	3	84.55	3	122.29	3	206.84
Dec 15–18, 2022	(Italy) 2023 Italian Championships	1	91.36	1	134.42	1	225.78
Jan 25–29, 2023	(Finland) 2023 European Championships	1	85.53	1	124.91	1	210.44
Mar 22–26, 2023	(Japan) 2023 World Championships	2	88.21	2	131.64	2	219.85
Apr 13–16, 2023	(Japan) 2023 World Team Trophy	2	90.90	2	132.34	4 (2)	223.24

Results in the 2023–24 season
Date	Event	RD		FD		Total	
Date	Event	P	Score	P	Score	P	Score
Sep 8–10, 2023	(Italy) 2023 CS Lombardia Trophy	1	84.61	1	123.41	1	208.02
Oct 3–5, 2023	(China) 2023 Shanghai Trophy	1	77.14	1	126.14	1	203.28
Nov 3–5, 2023	2023 Grand Prix de France	1	86.62	1	127.92	1	214.54
Nov 24–26, 2023	(Japan) 2023 NHK Trophy	1	85.27	2	129.29	2	214.56
Dec 7–10, 2023	(China) 2022–23 Grand Prix Final	2	85.82	2	129.69	2	215.51
Dec 22–23, 2023	(Italy) 2024 Italian Championships	1	91.59	1	138.39	1	229.98
Jan 10–14, 2024	(Lithuania) 2024 European Championships	1	86.80	1	128.58	1	214.38
Mar 18–24, 2024	(Canada) 2024 World Championships	2	87.52	3	129.00	3	216.52

Results in the 2024–25 season
Date	Event	RD		FD		Total	
Date	Event	P	Score	P	Score	P	Score
Sep 12–15, 2024	(Italy) 2024 CS Lombardia Trophy	1	87.45	1	128.18	1	215.63
Oct 3–5, 2024	(China) 2024 Shanghai Trophy	1	84.99	1	124.76	1	209.75
Nov 1 – 3, 2024	2024 Grand Prix de France	1	82.20	5	106.88	2	189.08
Nov 22–24, 2024	2024 Cup of China	1	84.84	1	124.29	1	209.13
Dec 5–8, 2024	(France) 2024–25 Grand Prix Final	2	83.12	3	122.99	2	206.11
Dec 19–21, 2024	(Italy) 2025 Italian Championships	1	91.39	1	135.33	1	226.72
Jan 28 – Feb 2, 2025	(Estonia) 2025 European Championships	1	84.23	1	127.89	1	212.12
Mar 26–30, 2025	(United States) 2025 World Championships	4	83.04	4	123.42	4	206.46
Apr 17–20, 2025	(Japan) 2025 World Team Trophy	3	84.58	3	121.82	3 (3)	206.40

Results in the 2025–26 season
Date	Event	RD		FD		Total	
Date	Event	P	Score	P	Score	P	Score
Oct 17–19, 2025	2025 Grand Prix de France	5	77.25	4	118.73	4	195.98
Nov 6–9, 2025	(Japan) 2025 NHK Trophy	2	76.36	2	122.31	2	198.67
Dec 3–6, 2025	(Croatia) 2025 CS Golden Spin of Zagreb	1	83.06	1	121.12	1	204.18
Dec 17–20, 2025	(Italy) 2026 Italian Championships	1	84.87	1	128.54	1	213.41
Jan 13–18, 2026	(United Kingdom) 2026 European Championships	3	84.48	2	125.86	2	210.34
Feb 6–8, 2026	(Italy) 2026 Winter Olympics – Team event	5	83.54	2	124.22	3	—N/a
Feb 6–19, 2026	(Italy) 2026 Winter Olympics	5	84.28	4	125.30	4	209.48

=== Ice dance with Guillaume Paulmier (for France) ===
2008–09 season
Date	Event	CD	OD	FD	Total
February 22–March 1, 2009	2009 World Junior Championships	16; 24.56	19; 38.22	18; 57.10	19; 119.98
January 16–17, 2009	2009 French Junior Championships	1; 28.60	1; 48.46	1; 71.60	1; 148.66
December 19–21, 2008	2008 French Championships	-	5; 40.09	5; 65.87	5; 105.96
December 4–7, 2008	2008 Santa Claus Cup (Junior)	1; 25.91	1; 43.37	1; 66.31	1; 134.59
October 2–4, 2008	2008 Junior Master's de Patinage	-	1; 47.93	1; 72.58	1; 120.51
August 27–31, 2008	2008 JGP France	3; 28.19	6; 43.26	7; 61.54	8; 132.99
2007–08 season
Date	Event	CD	OD	FD	Total
February 25–March 2, 2008	2008 World Junior Championships	16; 24.83	17; 40.90	21; 57.05	18; 122.78
January 19–20, 2008	2008 French Junior Championships	5; 24.95	3; 46.59	3; 69.52	3; 141.06
October 3–6, 2007	2007 JGP Bulgaria	9; 25.16	8; 41.32	9; 56.52	9; 123.00
September 27–30, 2007	2007 Junior Master's de Patinage	2; 27.28	2; 44.96	3; 63.39	3; 135.63
August 30–September 2, 2007	2007 JGP United States	4; 25.45	6; 39.71	5; 58.24	5; 123.40
2006–07 season
Date	Event	CD	OD	FD	Total
January 27–28, 2007	2007 French Junior Championships	4; 24.44	6; 33.11	6; 51.25	6; 108.80
October 19–22, 2006	2006 JGP Czech Republic	12; 22.06	14; 33.01	11; 48.82	12; 103.89
September 28-October 1, 2006	2006 Junior Master's de Patinage	4; 23.21	5; 33.07	6; 43.80	5; 100.08

=== Ice dance with Goulven Fourdan for France ===
2005-06 Season
Date	Event	CD	OD	FD	Total
January 28–29, 2006	2006 French Junior Championships	8; 19.19	7; 30.16	8; 41.64	8; 90.99
September 29 - October 3, 2005	2005 Junior Master's de Patinage	-	-	-	8; 68.05
