= Evgenia Kosigina =

Russian ice dancer (born 1995)

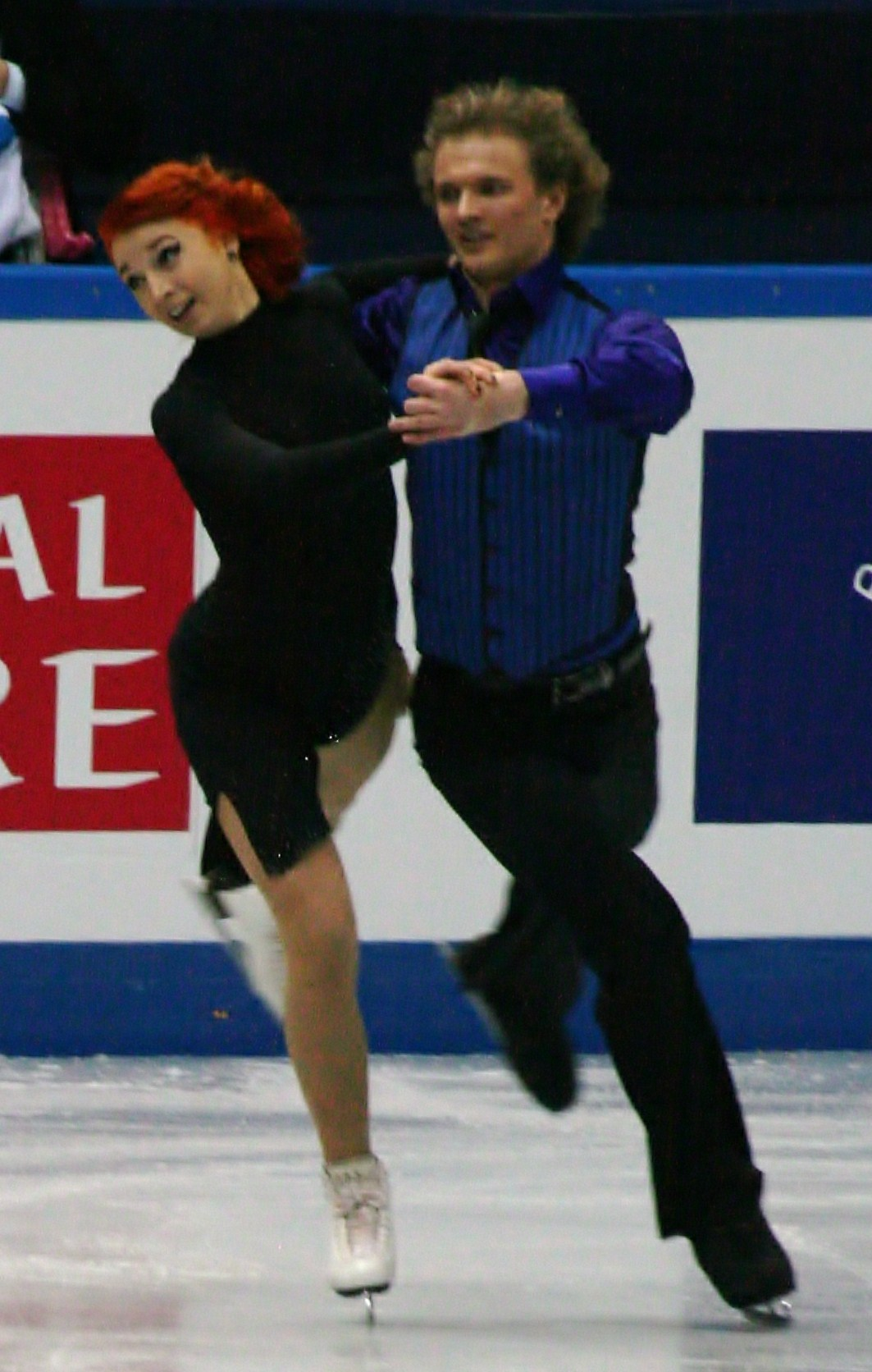
- Kosigina and Moroshkin at the 2012-13 JGP Final

Personal information
- Full name: Evgenia Borisovna Kosigina
- Born: 20 March 1995 (age 31) Odintsovo, Russia
- Height: 1.60 m (5 ft 3 in)

Figure skating career
- Country: Russia
- Partner: Nikolai Moroshkin
- Coach: Oleg Sudakov; Alexei Gorshkov
- Skating club: UOR No. 4 Tolyatti; Winter Sport Center Odintsovo
- Began skating: 2000

Evgenia Borisovna Kosigina (Russian: Евгения Борисовна Косыгина; born 20 March 1995) is a Russian former competitive ice dancer. With Nikolai Moroshkin, she won six medals on the ISU Junior Grand Prix series and finished in the top ten at three World Junior Championships.

== Career ==
Kosigina began skating to improve her health and took up ice dancing when she was eight. She competed in novice ice dance with Anatoli Kolisgo and later skated with Sergey Mozgov, with whom she debuted on the Junior Grand Prix. Her partner left her after the 2009–10 season.

Kosigina began skating with Nikolai Moroshkin in June 2010, coached by Alexei Gorshkov in Kosigina's hometown of Odintsovo, near Moscow. During the 2010–11 season, Kosigina/Moroshkin won bronze at their first JGP event, in Courchevel, France. At their second event, in Dresden, Germany, they won a gold medal. These medals qualified them for the Junior Grand Prix Final, where they finished sixth. At the 2011 Russian Junior Championships, Kosigina/Moroshkin won the bronze medal and then placed sixth at the 2011 World Junior Championships.

Kosigina/Moroshkin competed in the 2011–12 Junior Grand Prix, winning silver in Latvia and bronze in Estonia. They finished fifth at the 2012 Russian Junior Championships and were not assigned to Junior Worlds.

Kosigina/Moroshkin received additional coaching from Igor Shpilband in preparation for the 2012–13 season. They won a pair of silver medals at their events in Lake Placid, New York, and Zagreb, Croatia, and finished sixth at the JGP Final in Sochi, Russia. They then won silver at the 2013 Russian Junior Championships and finished sixth at the 2013 World Junior Championships.

Kosigina/Moroshkin finished fourth at the 2014 Russian Junior Championships. Initially first alternates, they joined the Russian team to the 2014 World Junior Championships after Alexandra Stepanova / Ivan Bukin withdrew.

== Programs ==
(with Moroshkin)

Season	Short dance	Free dance	Exhibition
2014–2015	Malagueña by Connie Francis; España cañí	Vai vedrai; Balade Au Bout D'une Échelle from Cirque du Soleil	
2013–2014	Bei mir bist du schoen performed by Puppini Sisters; Juke Box by Dimie Cat; Bei mir bist du schoen performed by Puppini Sisters	Flamenco; Oblivion by Astor Piazzolla	
2012–2013	Blues and swing: Capone by Ronan Hardiman	Liberian Girl by Michael Jackson	Heartbeat by Nneka
2011–2012	Chilly Cha Cha; ?	Walpurgisnight	
2010–2011	Shar Goluboy (Russian: шар голубой) by unknown	Waltz No. 7 by Frédéric Chopin	Strangers in the Night by Frank Sinatra

== Competitive highlights ==
CS: Challenger Series; JGP: Junior Grand Prix

=== With Moroshkin ===
International
Event	10–11	11–12	12–13	13–14	14–15
Winter Universiade					4th
CS Golden Spin					5th
CS Warsaw Cup					4th
Ice Star					2nd
International: Junior
World Junior Champ.	6th		6th	9th	
JGP Final	6th		6th		
JGP Croatia			2nd		
JGP Estonia		3rd			
JGP France	3rd				
JGP Germany	1st				
JGP Latvia		2nd			
JGP Poland				4th	
JGP United States			2nd		
Istanbul Cup		2nd J			
National
Russian Champ.					6th
Russian Junior Champ.	3rd	5th	2nd	4th	
J = Junior level

=== With Mozgov ===
International
Event	08–09	09–10
JGP Hungary		5th
NRW Trophy	5th J	
National
Russian Junior Champ.	11th	12th
J = Junior level
