= Nikolai Moroshkin =

Russian choreographer and competitive ice dancer

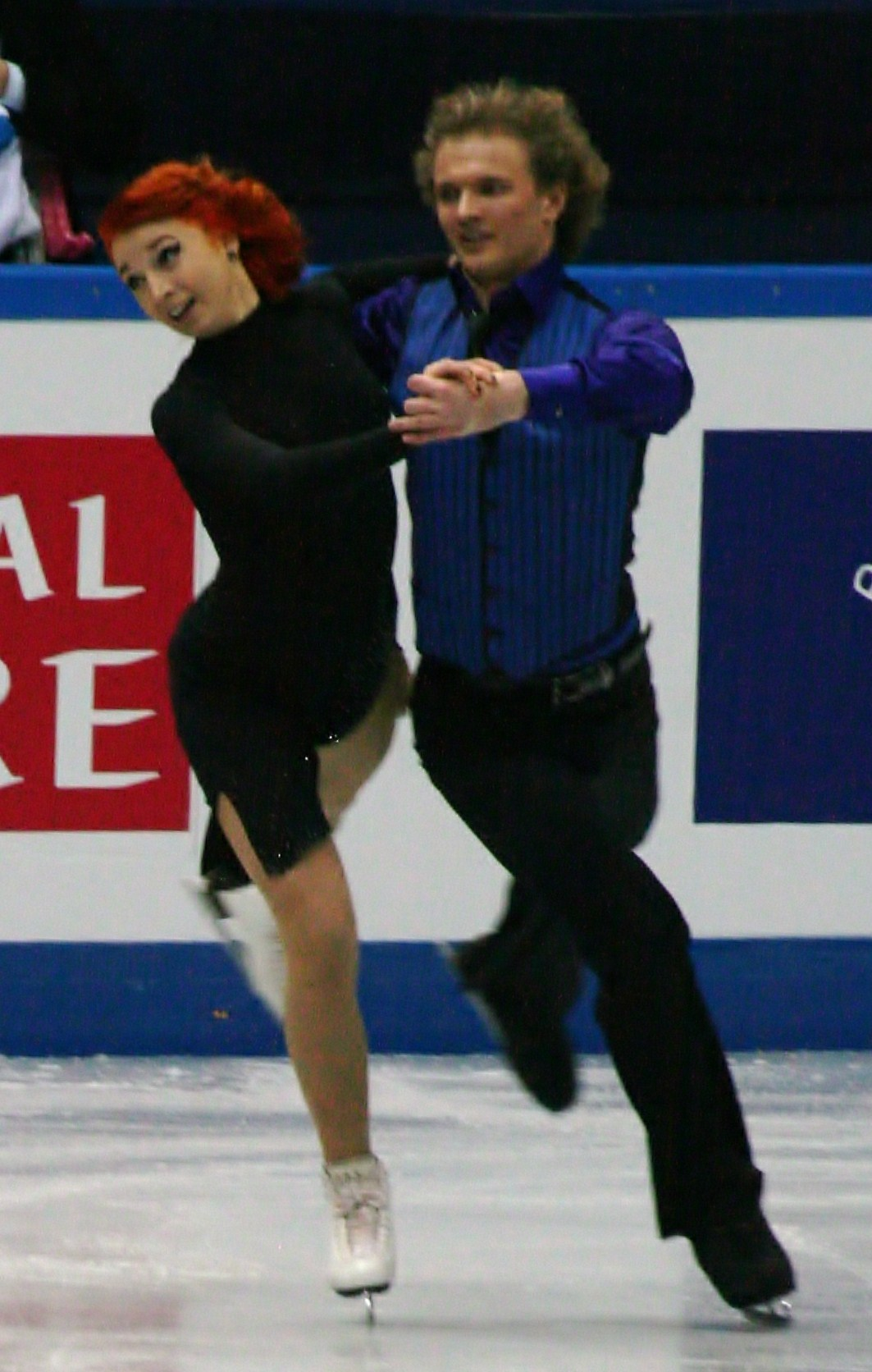
- Kosigina and Moroshkin at the 2012–13 JGP Final

Personal information
- Full name: Nikolai Yurievich Moroshkin
- Born: 15 November 1993 (age 32) Tolyatti, Russia
- Height: 1.80 m (5 ft 11 in)

Figure skating career
- Country: Russia
- Partner: Evgenia Kosigina
- Coach: Oleg Sudakov; Alexei Gorshkov
- Skating club: UOR No. 4 Tolyatti; Winter Sport Center Odintsovo
- Began skating: 1998

Nikolai Yurievich Moroshkin (Russian: Николай Юрьевич Морошкин: born 15 November 1993) is a Russian choreographer and former competitive ice dancer. With Evgenia Kosigina, he won six medals on the ISU Junior Grand Prix series and finished in the top ten at three World Junior Championships.

== Career as a figure skater ==
Moroshkin began skating at the age of 5 to improve his health, and took up ice dancing at 11. He began skating with Evgenia Kosigina in June 2010 after their previous partners left them. Following the tryout in his hometown of Tolyatti, Moroshkin moved to train with her in Odintsovo, near Moscow, coached by Alexei Gorshkov.

During the 2010–2011 season, Kosigina/Moroshkin won bronze at their first JGP event, in Courchevel, France. At their second event, in Dresden, Germany, they won a gold medal. These medals qualified them for the Junior Grand Prix Final, where they finished sixth. At the 2011 Russian Junior Championships, Kosigina/Moroshkin won the bronze medal and then placed sixth at the 2011 World Junior Championships.

Kosigina/Moroshkin competed in the 2011–12 Junior Grand Prix, winning silver in Latvia and bronze in Estonia. They finished fifth at the 2012 Russian Junior Championships and were not assigned to Junior Worlds.

Kosigina/Moroshkin received additional coaching from Igor Shpilband in preparation for the 2012–13 season. They won a pair of silver medals at their events in Lake Placid, New York, and Zagreb, Croatia, and finished sixth at the JGP Final in Sochi, Russia. They then won silver at the 2013 Russian Junior Championships and finished sixth at the 2013 World Junior Championships.

Kosigina/Moroshkin finished fourth at the 2014 Russian Junior Championships. Initially first alternates, they joined the Russian team to the 2014 World Junior Championships after Alexandra Stepanova / Ivan Bukin withdrew.

== Career as a choreographer ==
In 2017–2018, Nikolai Moroshkin worked at the Olympic School St. Petersburg with the students of the coach Roman Usatov, who works as an assistant to Evgeny Rukavicin. Since 2019, Moroshkin has been working at Tamara Moskvina Figure Skating Club with single and pair skaters.

His current and former choreography clients include:

- Aleksandra Boikova / Dmitrii Kozlovskii
- Anastasia Mishina / Aleksandr Galliamov
- Petr Gumennik
- Iasmina Kadyrova / Ivan Balchenko
- Andrei Kutovoi
- Nikolai Ugozhaev
- Ekaterina Petushkova / Evgeni Malikov
- Ekaterina Storublevtceva / Artem Gritsaenko
- Evgeniia Tumanova / Georgy Kunitsa
- Maria Talalaikina

== Programs ==
(with Kosigina)

Season	Short dance	Free dance	Exhibition
2014–2015	Malagueña by Connie Francis; España cañí	Vai vedrai; Balade Au Bout D'une Échelle from Cirque du Soleil	
2013–2014	Bei mir bist du schoen performed by Puppini Sisters; Juke Box by Dimie Cat; Bei mir bist du schoen performed by Puppini Sisters	Flamenco; Oblivion by Astor Piazzolla	
2012–2013	Blues and swing: Capone by Ronan Hardiman	Liberian Girl by Michael Jackson	Heartbeat by Nneka
2011–2012	Chilly Cha Cha; ?	Walpurgisnight	
2010–2011	Shar Goluboy (Russian: шар голубой) by unknown	Waltz No. 7 by Frédéric Chopin	Strangers in the Night by Frank Sinatra

== Competitive highlights ==
CS: Challenger Series; JGP: Junior Grand Prix

=== With Kosigina ===
International
Event	10–11	11–12	12–13	13–14	14–15
Winter Universiade					4th
CS Golden Spin					5th
CS Warsaw Cup					4th
Ice Star					2nd
International: Junior
World Junior Champ.	6th		6th	9th	
JGP Final	6th		6th		
JGP Croatia			2nd		
JGP Estonia		3rd			
JGP France	3rd				
JGP Germany	1st				
JGP Latvia		2nd			
JGP Poland				4th	
JGP United States			2nd		
Istanbul Cup		2nd J			
National
Russian Champ.					6th
Russian Junior Champ.	3rd	5th	2nd	4th	
J = Junior level

=== With Starygina ===
National
Event	2007–08	2008–09	2009–10
Russian Junior Championships	11th	9th	10th
