= Alexei Gorshkov =

Russian ice dancing coach

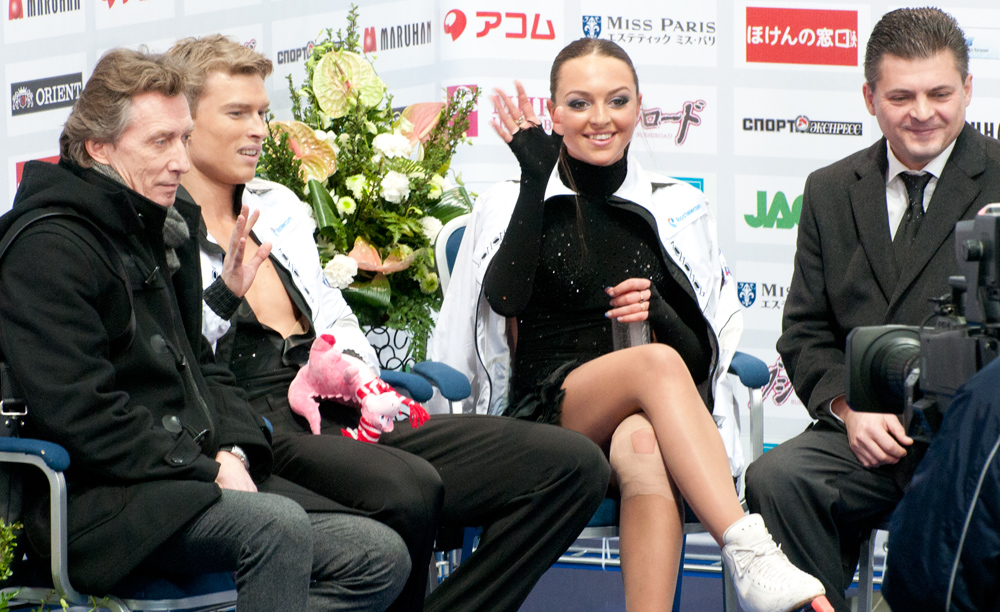
- Gorshkov (right) at the 2011 Rostelecom Cup

Personal information
- Full name: Alexei Yurievich Gorshkov
- Born: 30 January 1967 (age 59) Sverdlovsk, Russian SFSR, Soviet Union

Alexei Yurievich Gorshkov (Russian: Алексей Юрьевич Горшков; born 30 January 1967) is a Russian ice dancing coach.

== Coaching career ==
Gorshkov coaches in Odintsovo, near Moscow. His notable senior dance teams are:

- Albena Denkova / Maxim Staviski (2004 World silver medalists; coached until March 2005)
- Oksana Domnina / Maxim Shabalin (2008 European champions, coached until June 2008)
- Ekaterina Riazanova / Ilia Tkachenko
- Nóra Hoffmann / Maxim Zavozin
- Anastasia Platonova / Andrei Maximishin

Notable junior-level dance teams:

- Natalia Romaniuta / Daniil Barantsev (2000 and 2001 World Junior champions)
- Anastasia Gorshkova / Ilia Tkachenko (2005 World Junior bronze medalists)
- Maria Monko / Ilia Tkachenko (2007-2008 Junior Grand Prix Final champions)
- Evgenia Kosigina / Nikolai Moroshkin

== Personal life ==
Alexei Gorshkov has two daughters, one of whom is former competitive ice dancer Anastasia Gorshkova (born 13 March 1987).
